= List of pasta =

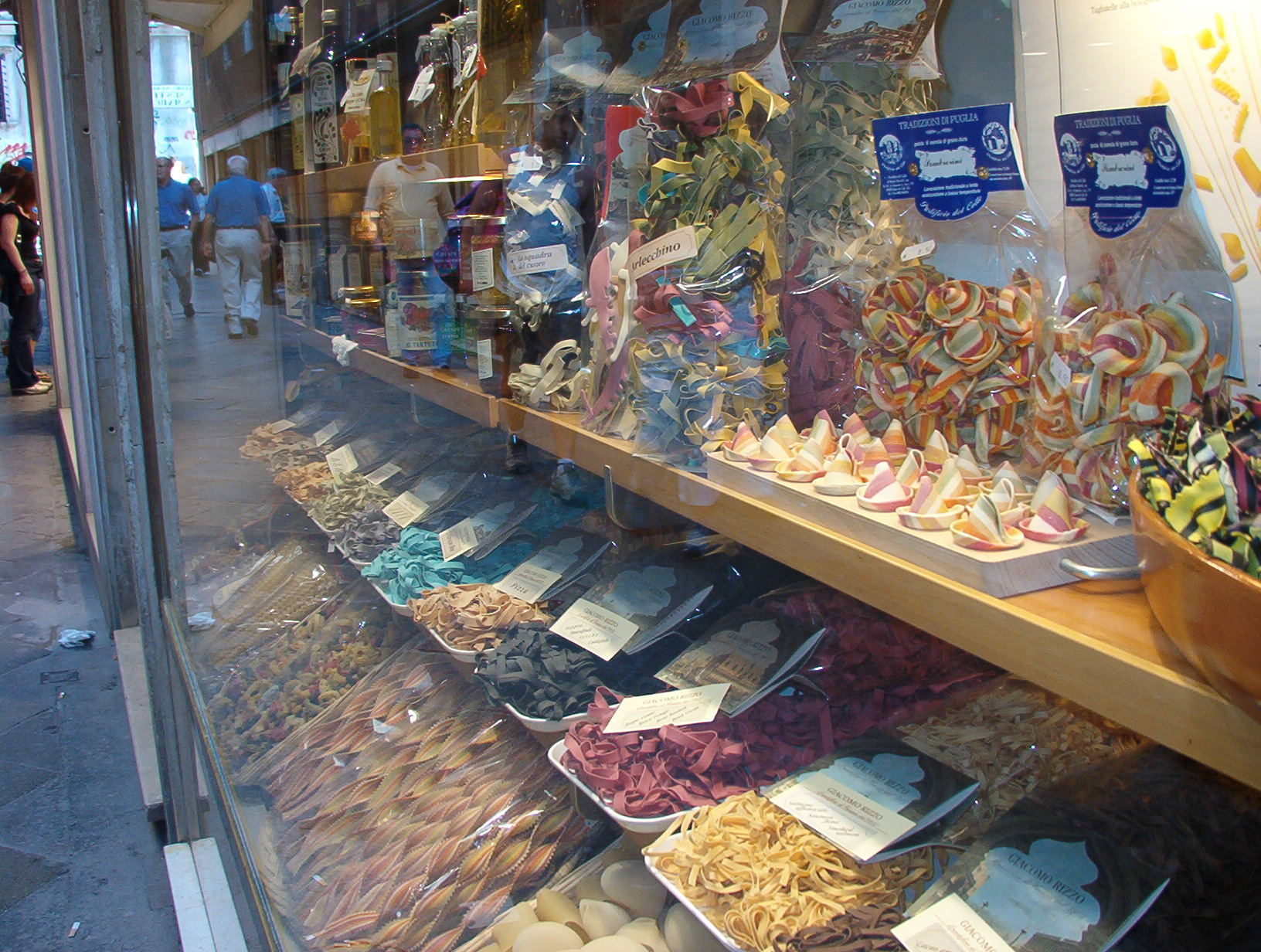
Some different colours and shapes of pasta in a pasta specialty store in Venice, Italy

There are many different varieties of pasta. It may be long (pasta lunga) or short (pasta corta). It may have a simple shape like a thin cylinder (spaghetti), a sheet (lasagna), a tube (penne), or a grain, or be complex and three-dimensional. It may be stuffed or not. It may be boiled, then served drained (pastasciutta), cooked in broth (pasta in brodo), baked (pasta in forno). Some varieties are ubiquitous, others are unknown outside their region of origin.

Names vary by region, by language, and by manufacturer: "one man's gnocchetto can be another's strascinato". For example, cut rotelle are also called ruote in Italy and 'wagon wheels' in the United States. Manufacturers and cooks often invent new shapes of pasta, or may rename pre-existing shapes.

Italian pasta names often end with the masculine plural diminutive suffixes -ini, -elli, -illi, -etti or the feminine plurals -ine, -elle, etc., all conveying the sense of 'little'; or with the augmentative suffixes -oni, -one, meaning 'large'. Other suffixes like -otti 'largish', and -acci 'rough, badly made', may also occur.

== Long- and medium-length pasta ==
Long pasta may be made by extrusion or rolling and cutting.

List of long- and medium-length pasta
Type	Image	Description	Translation	Synonyms	Origin or main area of consumption
Barbine		Thin strands, often coiled into nests	Little beards	Barbina	
Bavette		Narrower version of tagliatelle	Bibs	Baverine, bavettine, lasagneddi (in Sicily)	Liguria
Bigoli		Thick, softer, spaghetti-like pasta. Made with whole wheat rather than durum. Sometimes made with duck egg.	From bigolaro, the pasta press used to make bigoli	Fusarioi	Veneto
Bucatini		Thick spaghetti-like pasta with a hole running through the center	Hollow straws. Translated from Italian: buco, meaning "hole", and Italian: bucato, meaning "pierced".	Boccolotti, perciatellini, foratini, fidelini bucati, fide bucate, agoni bucati, spilloni bucati	Lazio
Busiate (or busiati)		Type of long macaroni. Often coiled around a twig of local weed.	From busa, meaning "reed"	Subioti, fusarioi, maccheroni bobbesi, busa, ciuffolitti (Abruzzo), gnocchi del ferro	Sicily (particularly Trapani) Sardinia
Capellini		Very thin spaghetti, often coiled into nests. Capelli d'angelo are slightly thinner.	Thin hair, little hair	Angel Hair, Capelli d'angelo, cabellos de angel, capelvenere, fidelini, fedelini, cappellini, sopracappellini, capellini fini, bassetti, tagliolini a nido, barbine a nido, ramicia, vrimiciddi	Liguria
Fedelini		Very thin spaghetti	Little faithful ones		Naples, Genoa and Liguria
Ferrazzuoli		Similar to a twisted buccato with a cleft running on the side	Possibly from the thin iron square used to create the cleft	Cannucce	Calabria
Fettuccine		Ribbon of pasta approximately 6.5 millimeters wide. Larger and thicker than tagliatelle.	Little ribbons: from affettare, "to slice".	Lasagnette, fettucce, ramicce, sagne	Rome
Fileja		Elongated screw	Dialectal for yarn, filato	filleda, filateddhi, filatelli, fusilli avellinesi, maccaruni aru ferru, ricci di donna	Vibo Valentia (Calabria), Avellino (Campania)
Lagane		Wide pasta		Lasagnoni, Bardele	
Lasagna		Square or rectangle sheets of pasta that sometimes have fluted edges (lasagne ricce). The square of pasta is lasagna while the dish is lasagne.	Possibly from Latin lasanum or Greek lasonon, "Cooking pot", or the Greco-Roman laganum, a flat piece of bread	bardele, lasagnoni (Veneto); capellasci (Liguria); sagne (Salento); lagana (Apulia); the fluted version can also be doppio festone, sciabo, sciablo	
Lasagnette		Narrower version of lasagna	Little lasagne		
Lasagnotte		Longer version of lasagnette	Bigger lasagna		
Linguine		Flattened spaghetti	Little tongues	Bavettine, bavette fini, radichini, linguettine	
Maccheroni alla molinara		Very thick, long, hand-pulled pasta	The miller’s wife’s pasta		Abruzzo
Maccheroncini di Campofilone		Thin strands of egg-based pasta. Similar to Capelli d'angelo.			Marche
Mafalde		Long rectangular ribbons with ruffled sides	Named in honor of Princess Mafalda of Savoy	Reginette, frese, tagliatelle nervate, signorine, trinette, ricciarelle, sfresatine, nastri, nastrini	Naples
Matriciani		Similar to perciatelli, but folded over rather than hollowed out			
Pappardelle		Thick flat ribbons of egg-based dough	From Tuscan papparsi, "to pig out"	Papparelle, paparele (Veneto); paspardelle (Marche)	Tuscany and northern Italy
Perciatelli		"Virtually identical to bucatini"	From perciare, "to hollow"	Maccheroncelli, Maccheroncini, Mezzanelli, Long Macaroni	Campania
Picagge		Flat strands about 1.5cm wide. Thinner sheet than lasagna. Can be white or green.	In Savonese dialect the name refers to the ribbons used as ornaments by dressmakers. In Genovese dialect however the word means napkin and refers to the size and shape of the pasta.	Picaje or piccagge	Liguria, in particular the province of Savona
Pici		Very thick, irregular and long, hand-rolled pasta	From appiciare, "to stick"	Lunghetti (Montalcino); pinci (Montepulciano); umbrici/ciriole (Umbria)	Tuscany
Pillus		Very thin ribbons		Lisanzedas, a variation; large discs in lasagne-like layers	Sardinia
Rustiche		Serrated ribbons	Literally the feminine plural of rustico, meaning 'rustic'		Apulia
Sagne 'ncannulate		Long tube formed of twisted ribbon	Caned lasagne		
Scialatelli or scialatielli		Short, flat ribbons			Sorrento
Spaghetti		A long, thin, cylindrical pasta of Italian origin, made of semolina or flour and water. Spaghettini and spaghettoni are slightly thinner or thicker, respectively.	"Little strings". Spaghetti is the plural form of the Italian word spaghetto, which is a diminutive of spago, meaning "thin string" or "twine".	Fide/fidi, fidelini, ristoranti, vermicelloni, filatelli, vermicelloni giganti	Sicily
Spaghetti alla chitarra		Square spaghetti, made of egg and flour	Named after the guitar-like device used to cut the pasta, which has a wooden frame strung with metal wires. Sheets of pasta are pressed down onto the device, and then the wires are "strummed" so the slivers of pasta fall through.	Tonnarelli, maccheroni alla chitarra	Abruzzo
Spaghettini		A slightly thinner version of spaghetti	Thin spaghetti	Thin spaghetti	
Spaghettoni		A slightly thicker version of spaghetti	Thick spaghetti	Spaghetti spessi	
Stringozzi		Similar to shoelaces	Shoestring-like, shoelaces		
Su Filindeu		Extremely rare pasta, made of thinly pulled and folded dough which is laid in the sun to dry	The threads (or wool) of God		Sardinia
Tagliatelle		Ribbons of egg-based pasta. Generally narrower than fettuccine.	From the Italian tagliare, meaning "to cut"	Tagliarelli, reginelle, fresine, nastri, fettuccelle, fettucce romane, fiadi, tagliolini; tagliatelle smalzade (Trentino); lesagnetes (Veneto); bardele (Lombardia); fettuccine (Lazio); pincinelle (Colonna); tagghiarini (Sicily); taddarini (Sardinia)	Emilia-Romagna (part. Bologna)
Tagliolini		Thinner version of tagliatelle	From the Italian tagliare, meaning "to cut"	Tagliolini; tagliatini (Tuscany); tajarin (Piedmont)	Liguria, Piedmont
Trenette		Thin ribbon ridged on one side. Slightly thicker than linguine.			
Tripoline		Thick ribbon ridged on one side		Signorine	
Vermicelli		A traditional pasta round that is thinner than spaghetti	Little worms		Campania
Ziti		Long, narrow hose-like tubes larger than mezzani (also called mezzi ziti) or bucatini that are traditionally broken before being put to cook. The addition of the word rigati (e.g. ziti rigati) denotes lines or ridges on the pasta's surface. Ziti candelati are longer, zitoni a bit larger.	Bride and bridegroom (ziti is plural) in Sicilian dialect	Boccolotti, zitoni, zituane, candele, ziti candelati	Sicily, Southern Italy

== Short-cut pasta ==
Short-cut pasta (pasta corta) are mostly made by extrusion.

List of short-cut pasta
Type	Image	Description	Translation	Synonyms	Origin or main area of consumption
Anelli		Short tubular, or annular-shaped, pasta sometimes with ridges on the inside or outside	Small rings	Anelloni, anellini, anelletti, anelloni d'Africa (large rings)	Sicily
Boccoli		Short, thick twisted shape	Ringlets		Sardinia
Calamarata		Wide ring-shaped pasta	Squid-like	Calamari	Naples
Campanelle or torchio		Flattened bell-shaped pasta with a frilly edge on one end. Torchio are identical but with a smooth edge.	Bellflower. Gigli are lilies, torchio is a press (usually for olive or grapes, but also pasta).	Gigli, cornetti, corni di bue	
Cappelli da chef		Extruded pasta that looks like a chef's hat	Chef hats	Chef's hats	
Casarecce		Short lengths extruded into a S shape	From casereccio, "homemade"	Casarecci, Cesariccia	Sicily, Campania
Cascatelli		Designed by Dan Pashman in 2021 – thick, half-tubed pasta with ruffled sides	From cascatelle, "little waterfalls"		United States
Castellane		Shell pasta coiled into a conical shape	Translated as "castle dweller", for the shape of the pasta loosely resembles that of a long, flowing robe		
Cavatappi		Corkscrew-shaped macaroni	Corkscrews	Cellentani, amori, spirali, fusilli rigati, curly mac.	
Cavatelli		Short, solid lengths. Exist in three sizes, usually measured in fingers (one, two or three).	From the verb cavare, "hollow"	Cortecce, gnocchetti, manatelli, orecchie di prete, strascinati, truoccoli; capunti, cingule, minuich, rascatelli, zinnezinne (Basilicata); cantaroggini, cavatieddi, cecatelli/cicatelli, cecatidde, mignuicchi, strascenate, tagghjunghele (Apulia and Campania); pincinelle (Marche); cavatielle, 'ncatenate, cazzarille, ciufele (Molise); cavasuneddi, cavatuneddi, gnucchitti, gnocculi (Sicily), pizzicarieddi (Apulia). Pictured is dry capunti, a variety of cavatelli from Apulia.	Southern continental Italy (i.e. Campania, Apulia, Molise, Basilicata, Calabria) and Sicily
Chifferi		Short and wide macaroni. Can be smooth (lisci) or furrowed (rigati).	From the Austrian cookies Kipferl	Gomiti	
Cicioneddos		Hand-rolled, shell-shaped pasta that are smaller than malloreddus			Sardinia
Conchiglie		Seashell-shaped, usually furrowed (rigate)	Shells	Arselle, abissini, coccioline, conchigliette, tofettine, cinesini, margaritine, cinesi rigati, mezzi cocci, margherite rigate, cappettine	
Creste di gallo		Short, curved, and ruffled	Cock's comb	Grui	
Fagioloni		Short narrow tube	Large beans		
Farfalle		Bow tie- or butterfly-shaped	Butterflies	fiochetti, fiocconi, farfalloni, galla genovese, strichetti (Modena), nocchette (Apulia and Abruzzo)	Northern Italy
Fazzoletti		Thin rectangles or squares of pasta	Handkerchief	Fazzoletti di seta, mandilli di sea (Ligurian dialect)	Liguria
Festoni		Thick ruffled helices	Festoon		
Fiorentine		Grooved cut tubes	Florentine		
Fiori		Shaped like a flower	Flowers		
Fusilli		Long, thick, corkscrew-shaped pasta that may be solid or hollow	The word fusilli presumably comes from Italian: fuso, meaning "spindle".	Eliche, girandole, rotini	
Fusilli bucati		A hollow version of fusilli. Note: different shapes can be attached to this name. Can be long, short or twined (lunghi, corti or gemellati).	Holed spindles	Busiata, maccaruna di casa, pirciati, filati cu lu pirtuso, fusilli col buco.	Sicily
Garganelli		Egg pasta in a square shape rolled into a tube	From garganel, "oesophagus"	Maccheroni al pettine (Marche), fischioni	Emilia-Romagna
Gemelli		A single S-shaped strand of pasta twisted in a loose spiral	The name derives from the Italian for twins.		
Gnocchi		Lobed shells. Not to be confused with gnocchi dumplings.	Possibly "knots"		
Gomiti		Elbow maccheroni, furrowed	From gomito, "elbow"	Chifferi	
Lanterne		Curved ridges	Lanterns		
Lorighittas		Strands of pasta rolled twice around three fingers to form a ring, and then twisted to look like a rope	Small rings		Morgongiori, Sardinia
Macaroni		Tubes, either bent or straight	From Greek for food made from barley	Macaroni (outside of Italy), maccheroncini	Naples
Maccheroncelli		Hollow tube-shaped pasta that is slightly smaller than a pencil in thickness	Small maccheroni		
Mafaldine		Short ribbons with ruffled sides	Little mafalde	Mafalda corta, Biricci	
Maltagliati		Irregular shapes of flat pasta formed from scraps of pasta production	Badly cut	Strengozze, malmaritati, blecs; pizzocherini (Valtellina); straciamus/spruzzamusi (Mantua); gasse, martaliai (Liguria); begnamusi/sguazzabarbuz (Emilia-Romagna); strengozze (Marche); sagne 'mpezze (Latium); pizzelle (Apulia); foglie di salice (Piedmont)	
Malloreddus		Hand-rolled, shell-shaped pasta with saffron. A machine-extruded version also exists, which typically omits the use of saffron.	In Campidanese dialect, a malloreddu is a male cow (plur. malloreddus).	Gnocchetti sardi, caidos, macarones cravaos, maccaronis de orgiu	Sardinia
Mandala		Designed by Philippe Starck in 1987 for French pasta maker Panzani, intended to compensate for overcooking	A reference to mandalas		
Marille		Designed by Giorgetto Giugiaro in 1983 – like a rolling ocean wave in cross-section with internal rugosities, but unsuccessful and no longer produced	From mare, "sea"		
Mezzani		Short curved tube	Half-size ones	Perciatelloni, Mezze Zite, Regine, Scaloppi, Napoletani, Hoernli (wide-spread in Switzerland, in at least 3 sizes)	
Mezze maniche		About half the length of rigatoni	Half-sleeves		
Mezze penne		Short version of penne	Half-pens		
Mezzi bombardoni		Wide short tubes	Half-bombards		
Nuvole		Short coiled pasta	Clouds		
Paccheri		Large tube pasta often topped with sauce or stuffed with ingredients. May collapse under own weight when cooking.	from Napolitan paccharia, "Slaps" with a depreciative -ero to indicate something common. The name has been ascribed to a slapping sound they may make when eaten.	Maniche di frate, maniche rigate, rigatoni, rigatoncini, bombaroni, tufoli rigati. Moccolotti in Marche and Umbria.	Naples
Passatelli		Made from bread crumbs, eggs, grated Parmesan cheese, lemon, and nutmeg, and cooked in chicken broth			Pesaro e Urbino (northern Marche) and other regions of northern Italy such as Emilia-Romagna
Pasta al ceppo		Sheet pasta that is similar in shape to a cinnamon stick	Log-type pasta		
Penne		Medium length tubes with ridges, cut diagonally at both ends. They can be either lisce (smooth) or rigate (grooved). Mostaccioli is also sometimes used for Barilla products, pennette have a shorter length and pennoni are wider and thicker.	Pens (after a quill pen) or feathers	Pennine, mezze pennette lisce, mezze penne, mezzani, pennettine, pennuzze, penne regina, mostaccioli, penne a candela, penne di natale/natalini, penne di ziti/zitoni.	Liguria
Penne ricce		Curled penne variant, usually grooved	Curly penne		
Picchiarelli		Slightly longer than cavatelli			Apulia
Pipe rigate		Very similar to Lumaconi but smaller has lines running the length of it	Grooved pipes		
Pizzoccheri		A type of short tagliatelle, a flat ribbon pasta, made with buckwheat flour: the lack of gluten makes them hard to manipulate.	From pinzochero, "bigot"	Fugascion, pizzocher di Tei	Valtellina (Lombardy)
Quadrefiore		Square with rippled edges	From quadro, "square" and fiore, "flower"		
Radiatori		Shaped like radiators, they were created between the First and Second World Wars. They are often used in similar dishes as rotelle or fusilli because their shape works well with thicker sauces.	Radiator	Marziani	
Riccioli		Hollow cut with cylindrical ridges	Curls.		
Ricciolini		Short wide pasta with a 90-degree twist	Little curls		
Ricciutelle		Short spiralled pasta	Little curls		
Rigatoncini		Smaller version of rigatoni	Small lined ones		
Rigatoni		Medium-Large tube with square-cut ends, sometimes slightly curved. Always grooved, and straight or bent depending on extrusion method.	From rigare, "to line, furrow, groove"	Bombardoni, cannaroni rigati, cannerozzi rigati, rigatoni romani, trivelli, tuffolini rigati	Lazio
Rombi		Rhombus-shaped ribbons			
Rotelle		Wagon wheel-shaped pasta	Little wheels	Biciclette, ruotine, ruote, rotelline, ruotelline, rotine, rotini	
Rotini		Fusili, but shorter			
Sagnette		Short thick ribbons from Abruzzo and Molise. Also called sagne or tagliolini.			
Sagnarelli		Rectangular ribbons with fluted edges			
Sedani		Slightly larger than macaroni with a similar slight bend. Can be smooth (lisci) or furrowed (rigati).	From sedano, "celery"	Sedanini, cornetti, diavoletti, diavolini, folletti; or zanne d'elefante if smooth.	Naples
Spirali		Spiraled tubes, a common alternative name for cavatappi	Spirals	Cavatappi, cellentani, amori, fusilli rigati.	
Spiralini (Scharfalini)		Tightly coiled spirali	Little spirals		
Strapponi		Strips of pasta ripped from a sheet	From strappare, "to rip off"		Tuscany
Strozzapreti		Rolled across their width. Similar to Sicilian casarecce.	Priest-chokers or priest-stranglers	Strangolarpreti, gnocchi di prete (Friuli); frigulelli, piccicasanti, strozzafrati (Marche), cecamariti (Lazio); maccheroni alla molinara (Abruzzo); strangulaprievete (Naples); strangulaprieviti (Calabria); affogaparini (Sicily)	Tuscany, Emilia-Romagna
Testaroli					Tuscany
Tortiglioni		Larger tubes than rigatoni. The grooves are also deeper and spiral around the pasta.	From Latin torquere, "to twist"	Elicoidali	Campania, Lazio
Treccioni		Coiled pasta	From treccia, "braid"		
Trenne		Penne shaped as a triangle		Triangoli, penne triangolo	
Trofie		Thin twisted pasta made of durum wheat and water. Trofie bastarde are made with chestnut flour.	Possibly from Greek trophe, "food" or local Genovese dialect strofissià or strufuggiâ, "to rub"	Rechelline, trofiette.	Liguria
Trottole		Pasta in the shape of spinning tops			
Tuffoli		Ridged rigatoni			
Vesuvio		Corkscrew-shaped pasta	From Mount Vesuvius		Campania

== Stretched pasta ==
Strascinati are mostly hand-made disks of pasta dragged (strascinato) across a wooden board. Orecchiette are a typical example.

List of stretched pasta
Type	Image	Description	Translation	Synonyms	Origin or main area of consumption
Cencioni		Petal shaped, slightly curved with rough convex side	Little rags	Mischiglio (Basilicata)	Southern Italy
Corzetti		Flat figure-eight stamped from Liguria	The name derives from a 14th century Genovese coin, the corzetto.	Curzetti (Genoa); crosets (Piedmont); crosetti (Emilia-Romagna); croxetti, torsellini	Val Polcevera
Fainelle		Flat strascinato that vaguely resembles carob	Fainella means carob in Pugliese dialect.		Foggia (Apulia)
Foglie d'ulivo		Shaped like an olive leaf	Olive leaves		Southern Apulia
Orecchiette		Irregular disc with a central dome and a slightly thicker crown. Strascinate are identical but flat.	Little ears	strascinate; recchini (Rome); recchietele (Campania, Molise and Basilicata); orecchie di prete (Abruzzo and Basilicata); cicatelli (Apulia); recchie di prevete (Foggia); cagghiubbi/fenescecchie (Bari); chancierelle/pochiacche (small/big versions; Taranto); stacchiodde (Lecce)	Apulia

== Soup pasta ==
These are small types of pasta, mainly used in soups, many of which belong to the pastina ('small pasta') family.

List of small or soup pasta
Type	Image	Description	Translation	Synonyms	Origin or main area of consumption
Acini di pepe		Bead-like pasta	Grains of pepper		
Alphabet pasta		Pasta that has been mechanically cut or pressed into the letters of the alphabet		Alfabeto	
Anchellini		Small beads			
Anelli		Small rings of pasta (not to be confused with Calamaretti)	Small rings	Aneletti, anidduzzi, cerchionetti, taraduzzi	Sicily
Anellini		Smaller version of anelli	Little rings	Anelline	
Armonie		Small "squiggles"			
Conchigliette		Small shell-shaped pasta	Little shells	Cocciolette	
Coquillettes		Semicircular			
Coralli		Ridged tubes			
Corallini		Small short tubes of pasta	Little corals		
Cuscussu		Minuscule dots reminding of couscous		Scucuzzu. Kusksu in Malta	Liguria, but found throughout Italy and in Malta.
Ditali		Short tubes whose diameter is roughly the same as their length. Can be lisci or rigati.	Thimbles	Ditalini, tubetti, tubettini, gnocchetti di ziti, ditaletti, coralli; denti di vecchia, denti di cavallo, ganghi di vecchia, magghietti (Apulia and Sicily)	Campania, Apulia
Egg barley					
Farfalline		Small bow tie-shaped pasta	Little butterflies ("bow tie" in Italian is cravatta a farfalla, "butterfly tie")		
Fideos		Pasta prepared with eggs, flour and water			
Filini		Smaller version of fideos, about 12–15 mm long before cooking	Little threads.		
Fregula		Bead-like pasta from Sardinia. Slightly toasted due to drying process.	Little fragments	Fregola, freula, fregua	Sardinia
Funghini		Small mushroom-shaped pasta	Little mushrooms		
Gianduietta		Farm animals			
Grano		Grain-shaped			
Gramigna		Short curled lengths of pasta. Spaccatelle are larger.	From gramigna, "weed" or spaccatura, "slot"	Crestine, margherite lisce, fagioletti, zitellini, tubettini lunghi, gramignoni, spaccatelle	Sicily, Emilia-Romagna, Marche, Friuli-Venezia Giulia
Grattini		Small granular, irregular shaped pasta (smaller version of Grattoni)	Little grains		
Grattoni		Large granular, irregular shaped pasta	Grains		
Margheritine		Daisy-shaped			
Merletti		Lace-shaped			
Midolline		Flat teardrop shaped pasta (similar to Orzo but wider)			
Occhi di passero		Thick rings			
Occhi di pernice		Very small rings of pasta	Partridge's eyes		
Orzo		Rice shaped pasta. Risoni are slightly bigger.	Barley, rice	Puntine, punte d'ago, armelline, semi d'orzo, semi d'avena, semi di riso, occhi di giudeo, armellette, puntalette, semi di cicoria, cicorietta, risetto, chicchi di riso, semini, avena, avena grande, cicorie, semi di melone, semi di mela, midolline, semoni, risone, risoni riso	
Pastina		Although pastina is the name for an entire family of miniature pasta shapes, it is also used to describe the most basic one in this family – small spheres, smaller than acini di pepe.	Little pasta		
Piombi		Spheres slightly larger than acini di pepe	"Leads" as in lead shot	Pearl pasta	
Ptitim		Rice grains, spheres or other forms	Flakes	Israeli couscous, Jerusalem couscous, giant couscous, pearl couscous	Israel
Puntine		Smaller version of Risi			
Quadrettini		Small flat squares of pasta	Little squares	Quadrucci, quadratini, quadretti, lucciole, quadrellini, quadrotti; quaternei (Emilia-Romagna); squadrucchetti (Umbria); ciciarchiola/cicerchiole (depending on size; Lazio).	
Sorprese		Small bell shaped pasta with a ruffled edge and a crease on one side. Can be ridged or smooth (lisce).	Surprise		
Stelle		Small star-shaped pasta	Stars, small or big (resp. stelline or stellette)	anellini, avermarie, astri, fiori di sambuco, lentine, puntine, semini, stellettine, stellette	
Stortini		Smaller version of elbow macaroni	Little crooked ones		
Tripolini		In larger varieties these are sometimes called farfalle tonde. Small bow tie-shaped pasta with rounded edges.	canestrini are small willow baskets.	Signorine, canestri, canestrini, farfallini, galani, nastrini, nodini, stricchetti	

== Filled pasta ==
The name raviolo (plural ravioli) can be used as a generic description for almost any type of filled pasta.

List of filled pasta
Type	Image	Description	Translation	Synonyms	Origin or main area of consumption
Agnolini		Agnolini are a type of stuffed egg pasta originating from the province of Mantua (commonly called agnulìn or agnulì in the Mantuan dialect) and are often eaten in soup or broth.	Diminutive of old word for 'angel'	"agnulìn" or "agnulì"	Lombardy
Agnolotti		Semicircular or square pockets; can be stuffed with ricotta, a mix of cheese and meats (agnolotti di grasso), or pureed vegetables (agnolotti di magro).	Diminutive of old word for 'angel'; "Agnolotti" was Giotto di Bondone's nickname.	agnellotti, agnolòt, angelotti, langaroli, langheroli, piat d'angelòt	Piedmont
Caccavelle		Large bowl-like pasta intended for stuffing	From Latin cacabus, 'pot'	Pentole (Naples)	Naples
Cannelloni		Rolls of pasta with various fillings, usually cooked in an oven	Derived from cana, 'reed'	Cannaciotti, canneroncini, cannarone or cannerone (Naples), cannarune (Apulia), canneroni, cannoli or crusetti (Sicily), manfriguli or manfrigoli (Valtellina), manicotti (in the US), gnocchettoni zitoni, tagliati di zitoni, cannelloni zitoni, spole, sigarette, schiaffoni	Central Italy
Cappelletti		Squares of dough filled with cheese (or, rarely, meat) and closed to form a small hat (cappello=hat). In the large majority of Romagna the filling is made with a mixture of Parmesan and soft cheese.	Little caps or hats	cappelli, cappelli del prete, or nicci in Tuscany.	Emilia-Romagna
Caramelle		Stuffed pasta resembling double-twist candies	Candy		Parma and Piacenza
Casoncelli		Stuffed pasta with various fillings	Possibly from casa, 'house'	Casonsei, casonziei, ciaroncie	Lombardy
Casunziei		Stuffed pasta with various fillings	From casa, 'house'		Veneto
Conchiglioni		Large, stuffable, seashell-shaped	Large shells		Campania
Culurgioni		Stuffed pasta, typically with a filling of potato and mint		Culingionis, culurzones, kulurjones, angiolottus, spighitti	Sardinia (particularly the south-eastern Ogliastra region)
Fagottini		A 'purse' or bundle of pasta, made from a round of dough gathered into a ball-shaped bundle, often stuffed with ricotta and fresh pear	Little cloth bundles		
Lumache		Snailshell-shaped pieces, larger than gomiti or pipe.	Snails	Lumachelle, lumachette, cirillini, chifferini, ciocchiolette, cirillini, gomitini, gozziti, lumachelle, lumachoni, lumaconi, pipe, pipette, tofarelle	
Mezzelune		Semicircular pockets about 2.5 in. diameter	Half-moons		
Occhi di lupo		Large, stuffed, penne-shaped pasta. Around 1.5 inches long.	Ribbed wolf eyes		
Pansotti		Triangular shape with a bulging center. Does not contain meat.	Big bellies	Ravioli di magro.	Liguria
Pavese agnolotti		Square pockets filled with Pavese stew.	Diminutive of old word for 'angel'; Agnolotti was Giotto di Bondone's nickname.	agnolot, agnulot, agnuloti	Lombardy
Ravioli		Each raviolo (singular form of ravioli) is constructed using two pieces of pasta, one on top of the other, sealed around the perimeter forming a cavity in the center. A filling of cheese, ground meat, pureed vegetables, or various mixtures thereof is encased in its cavity before sealing. Its shape is commonly square; however, other shapes, such as circular and semi-circular (mezzelune), are also acceptable.	Many claimed origins: possibly from rapa, 'vegetable root', or rabibole, 'cheap stuff' in Ligurian dialect; or simply from ravolgere, 'to wrap'.		
Rotolo ripieno		Rolled pasta with filling; a cooked roll is normally sliced, covered in sauce and broiled in the oven	"Stuffed roll"	Rotoli imbotito; strudel (Trentino-Alto Adige); pasta al sacco (Marche)	
Sacchettoni		Round, similar to fagottini, but also using ravioli stuffing. A small square of pasta is brought around the stuffing and twisted.	Little sacks	Sacchetti, sacchetini (depending on size)	
Sorrentinos		Round pasta, similar to the ravioli capresi, stuffed in its more common version with mozzarella and York ham. Original from Mar del Plata, Argentina.	Demonym from Sorrento		
Tortelli		Square sheet of pasta folded into a triangle or discus folded into a half-circle, with both extremities subsequently joined to form a ring shape. About 30x35 mm in size. Sweet variations can be found (tortelli cremaschi).	Little pies	Cappellacci, turtello (Emilia-Romagna), tordelli (Tuscany), casonsei (Bergame and Brescia)	
Tortellini		Ring-shaped, usually stuffed with a mixture of meat and cheese. About 25x20mm in size.	Small tortelli	Agnoli, presuner or prigioneri (Capri)	
Tortelloni		Round or rectangular, similar to tortelli but larger (38x45mm). Stuffing usually does not include meat.			
Tufoli		A pasta shell large enough for stuffing (as with meat or cheese). From a southern Italian dialect, plural of tufolo (tube), modification of Latin tubulus (tubule)	Large tube	Maniche, Gigantoni, Occhi di elefante, Elefante, Canneroni grandi, Occhi di bove	

== Gnocchi and gnocchetti ==
List of gnocchi and gnocchetti
Type	Image	Description	Translation	Synonyms	Origin or main area of consumption
Canederli		Small balls of dough. Usually made of bread crumbs, but sweet variants would have a potato base.	From the German Knödel	Gnocchi di pane, canedeli, knödel	Trentino-Alto Adige
Donderet		Elongated, narrow dumpling		Dandolarini, strangolapreti piemontesi	Piedmont, more particularly Cuneo province and Valle Colla.
Gnocchi		Various thick, small, and soft dough dumplings	May be derived from the Italian word nocchio, meaning a knot in wood, or from nocca, meaning knuckle	Gnocchetti, gnocchi alla romana, gnudi, malfatti, strangulaprievete, cavatelli, malloreddus	Various

== See also ==
- Italian cuisine
- List of Italian dishes
- Ragù – a meat-based sauce in Italian cuisine that is often served with pasta
- Semolina – wheat middlings of durum wheat used in making pasta
- List of noodles
