= Cascatelli =

Ruffled semicircular pasta shape

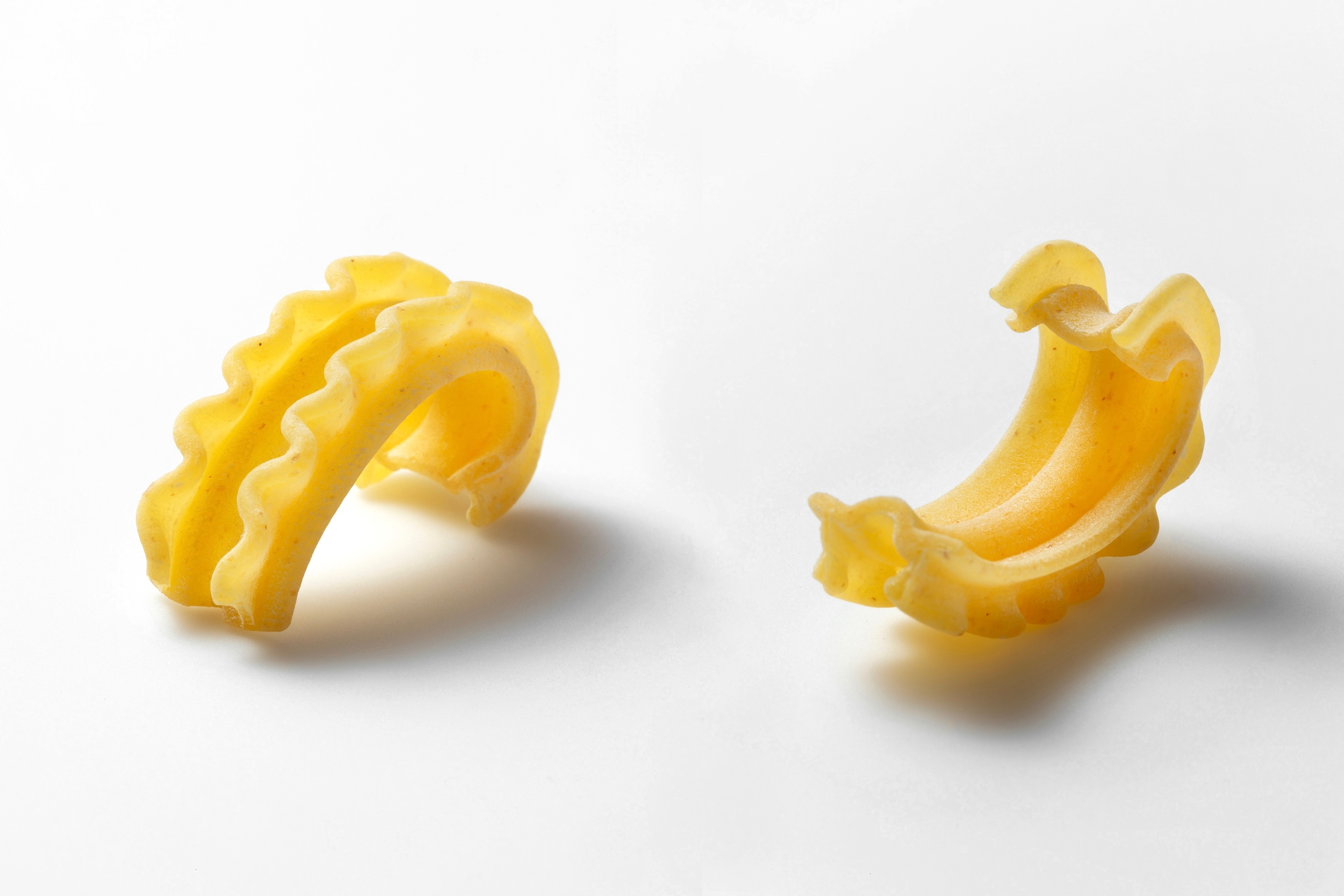
- Type: Pasta
- Place of origin: United States
- Created by: Dan Pashman
- Invented: 2021
- Main ingredients: Durum wheat flour, water

Cascatelli (Italian: [kaskaˈtɛlli]) are a short pasta shape with a flat strip and a pair of ruffles parallel to each other, each of which sticks out at a 90-degree angle from the strip. The ruffles give the shape texture and create a "sauce trough".

This modern pasta shape was developed over three years from 2018 to 2021 by American food podcaster Dan Pashman in collaboration with the New York pasta company Sfoglini. The shape is inspired by the ribbon-shaped ruffles of mafalda pasta and the half-tube components of bucatini pasta, and was designed to meet Pashman's preferred characteristics in a pasta shape, which he described as "forkability", "sauceability", and "toothsinkability". With its ruffled design, cascatelli closely resembles radiatori in shape.

== Name ==
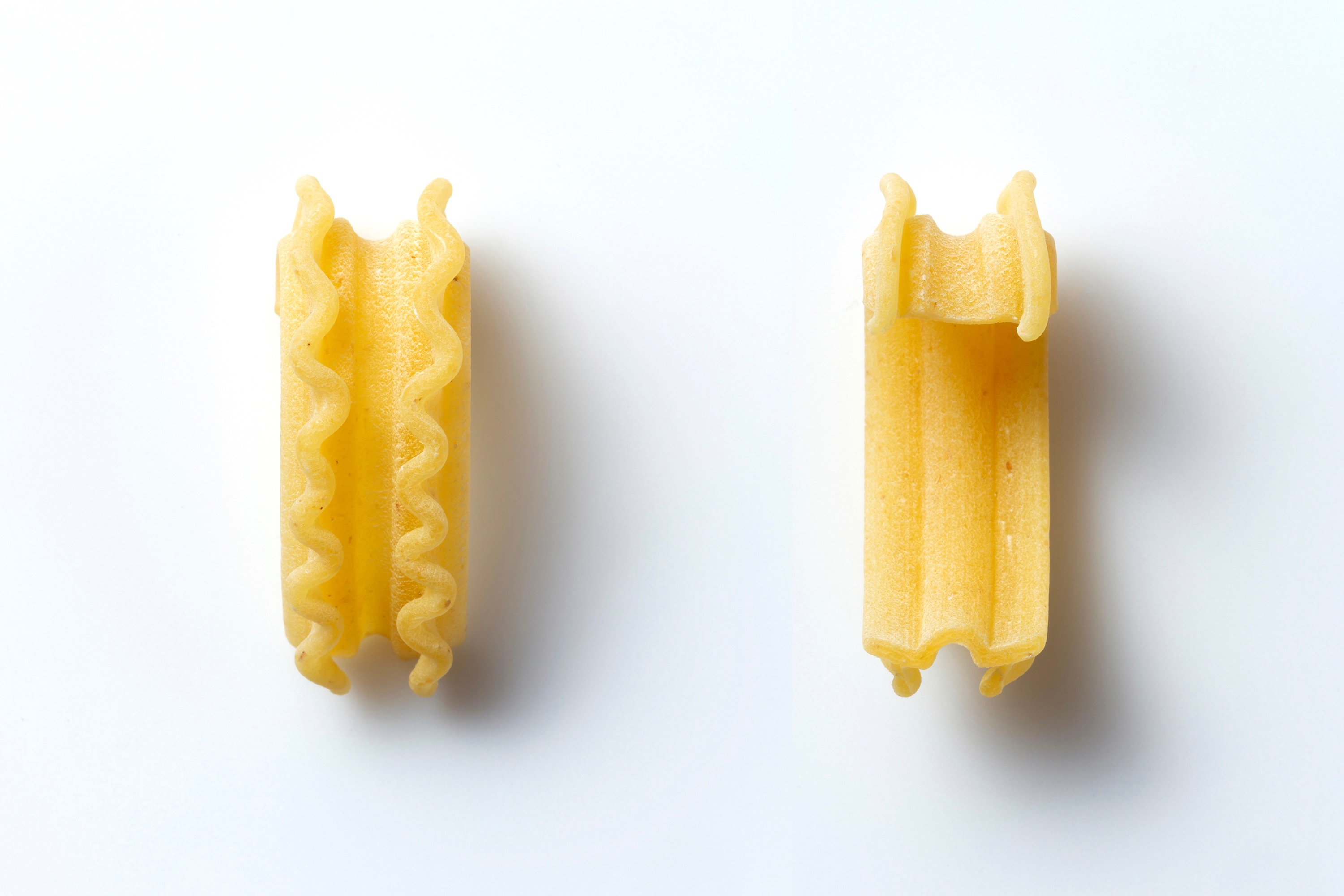
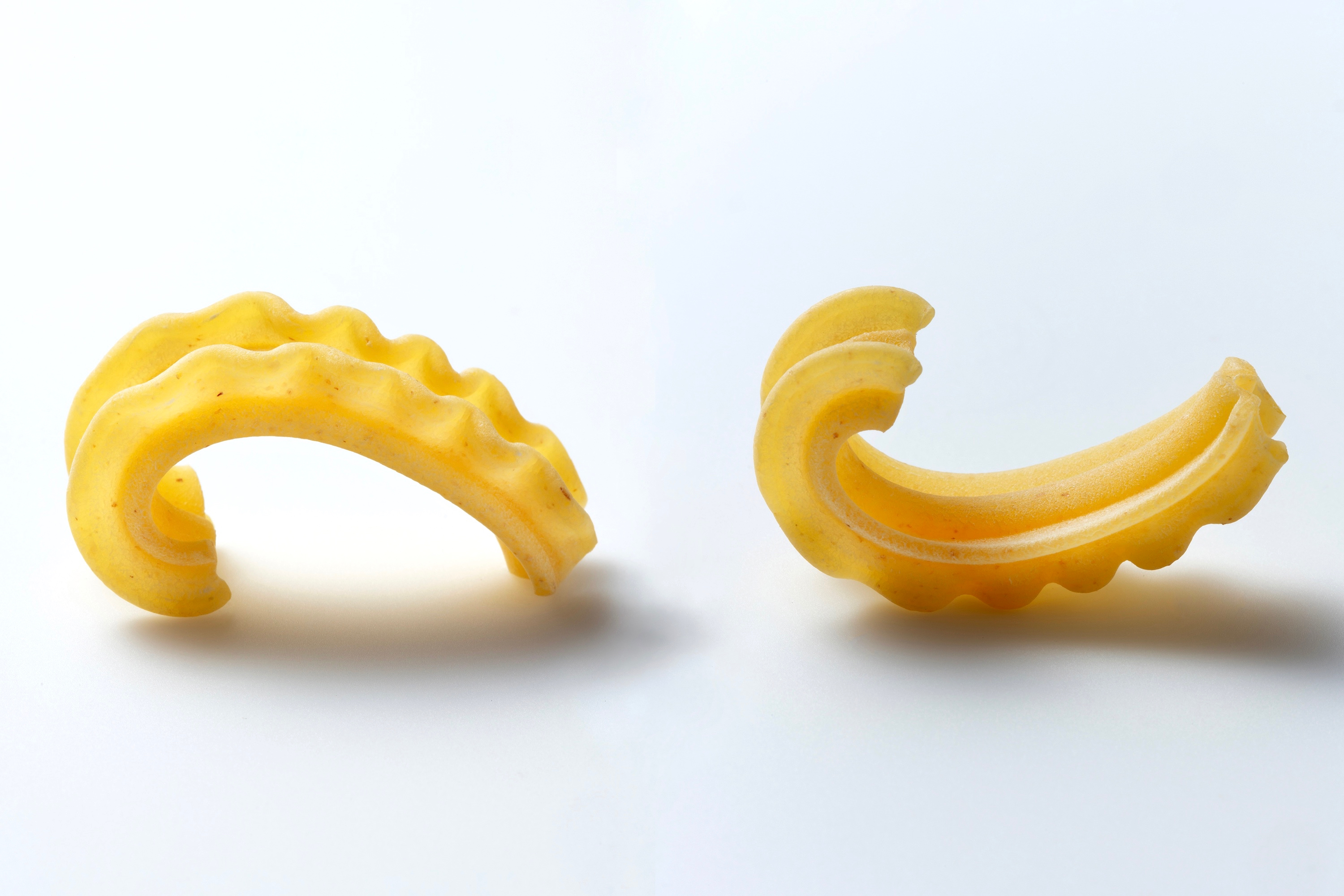

The name comes from the Italian cascate meaning 'waterfalls', while cascatelle means 'little waterfalls'. Pashman decided to end it with -elli to sound like more traditional Italian pasta names that often end with the masculine plural diminutive suffixes -ini, -elli, -illi, -etti to convey the sense of 'little'. While acknowledging that the correct Italian spelling for the plural of waterfall is cascatelle, he argued "I think we can take some poetic license. If we end it with an i, cascatelli, it sounds more like a pasta name". The name cascatelli received trademark protection in the United States for use in association with pasta in March 2021. Other potential names had included Italian variations on ridged dinosaurs, millipedes or the musical bass clef.

== History ==
Dan Pashman, host of The Sporkful podcast, decided to make a new "ideal" pasta shape which had a perfect bite, an appealing texture, and could hold the right amount of sauce. The American pasta company Sfoglini worked with Pashman to produce the product.

Pashman coined terms to describe the three qualities to talk about pasta shapes:

1. "Forkability" – how easy it is to get the pasta onto a fork and to keep it there
2. "Sauceability" – how well a sauce sticks to the pasta
3. "Toothsinkability" – how satisfying it is to bite into the pasta

Cascatelli was officially released in 2021, after a three-year research and development process. That process is documented in The Sporkful podcast series "Mission: ImPASTAble".

The shape was licensed to Trader Joe’s. In February 2022, Pashman announced a partnership with Banza to release the chickpea-based "Banza Cascatelli by Sporkful."

== Composition and use ==
Cascatelli are a half-tubed pasta made of hard durum wheat flour and water, or semolina. The suggested cook time is 8-10 minutes.

== See also ==
- Bucatini
- Mafaldine
- List of pasta
