= Mezzani (disambiguation) =

Mezzani is a municipality in Italy.

Mezzani may also refer to:

- Mezzani (pasta), Short-cut extruded pasta, with a short curved tube
- Giovanni Mezzani, Italian sport shooter
