= Rigati =

Rigati may refer to pasta with ridges or grooves, including:

- Cavatappi
- Spaghetti rigati
- Rigatoni
