= Stelline =

Type of pasta

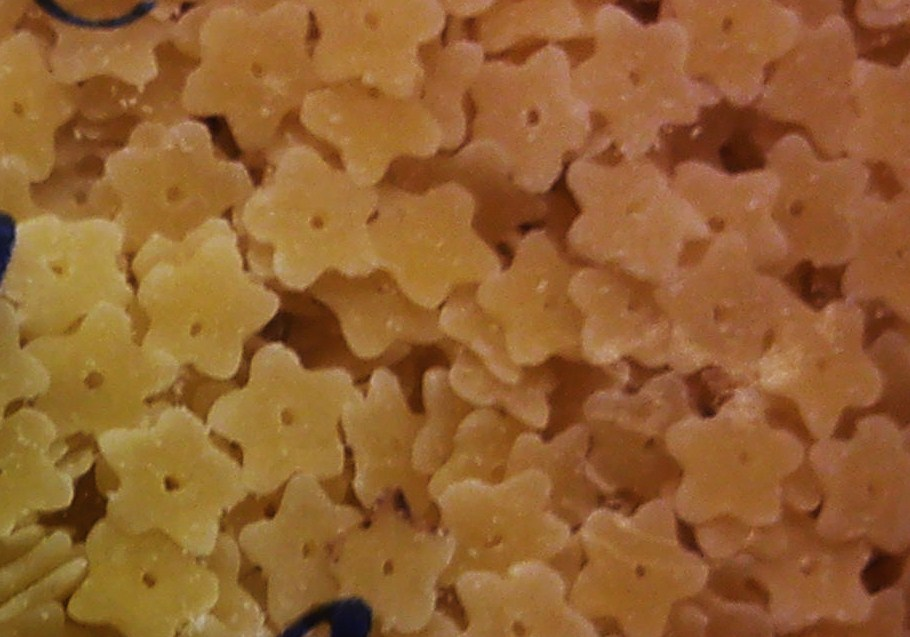
- Alternative names: Stelle
- Type: Pasta
- Place of origin: Italy

Stelline (lit. 'little stars'; sg.: stellina), also known as stelle (lit. 'stars'), are a form of pasta of tiny size.

Made of wheat flour and in most varieties also containing egg, stelline are produced in different sizes, and are characterized from a star shape with a hole in the middle. Their use is recorded in multiple 19th century dictionaries. Like other varieties of pastina, they are mainly used for soups, and are also employed as ingredients in some types of salads.

== See also ==
- List of pasta
