= Pillus =

Type of pasta

- Type: Pasta
- Place of origin: Italy
- Region or state: Sardinia
- Main ingredients: Flour, eggs

Pillus is a type of pasta originating on the island of Sardinia, particularly around Oristano. A noodle-like pasta, it is made in thin ribbon strips. A feature of this pasta is that it is kneaded for a long time. It is cooked in beef (or sometimes sheep) broth and served with pecorino cheese. In Busachi the pasta is flavoured with toasted saffron and ground to a powder.

Lisanzedas is a variant of pillus (and sometimes named as such) that is oven-baked in layers like lasagne. The shape of the pasta is large (7 to 8 inches) diameter disks rather than ribbons. It is the meat stew filling and the pecorino cheese that are the common factors rather than the shape of the pasta. A variant of lisanzedas found around Cagliari is flavoured with saffron. Another variant of this sort from Giba is flavoured with fennel.

== See also ==
- List of pasta
