= Foglie d'ulivo =

Type of pasta

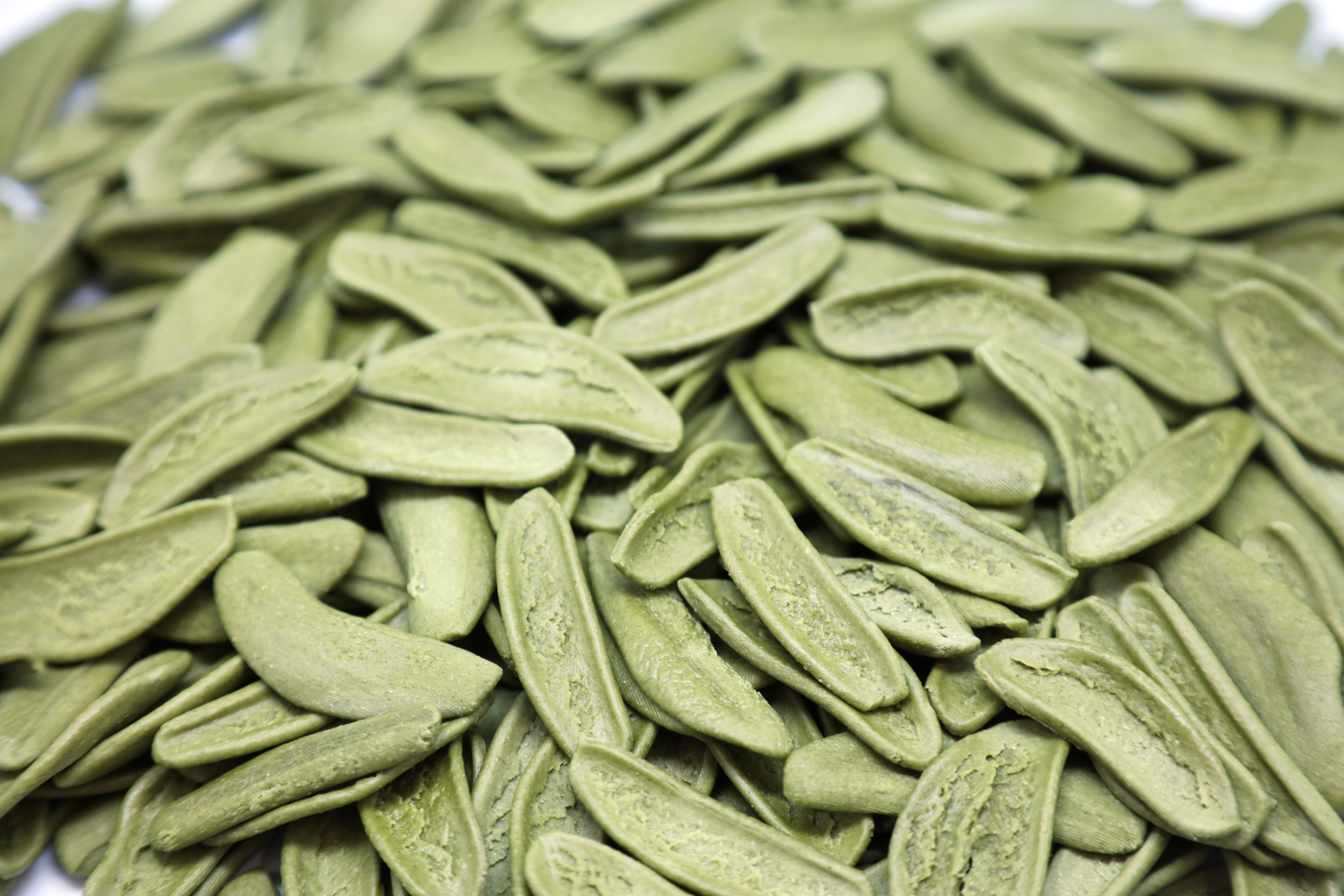
- Alternative names: Foglie di ulivo
- Type: Pasta
- Place of origin: Italy

Foglie d'ulivo (Italian: [ˈfɔʎʎe duˈliːvo]; also spelled foglie di ulivo) is a variety of handmade pasta made in the shape of olive leaves. It originates from Apulia and Liguria regions of Italy.

== See also ==
- List of pasta
