= Campanelle =

Type of pasta

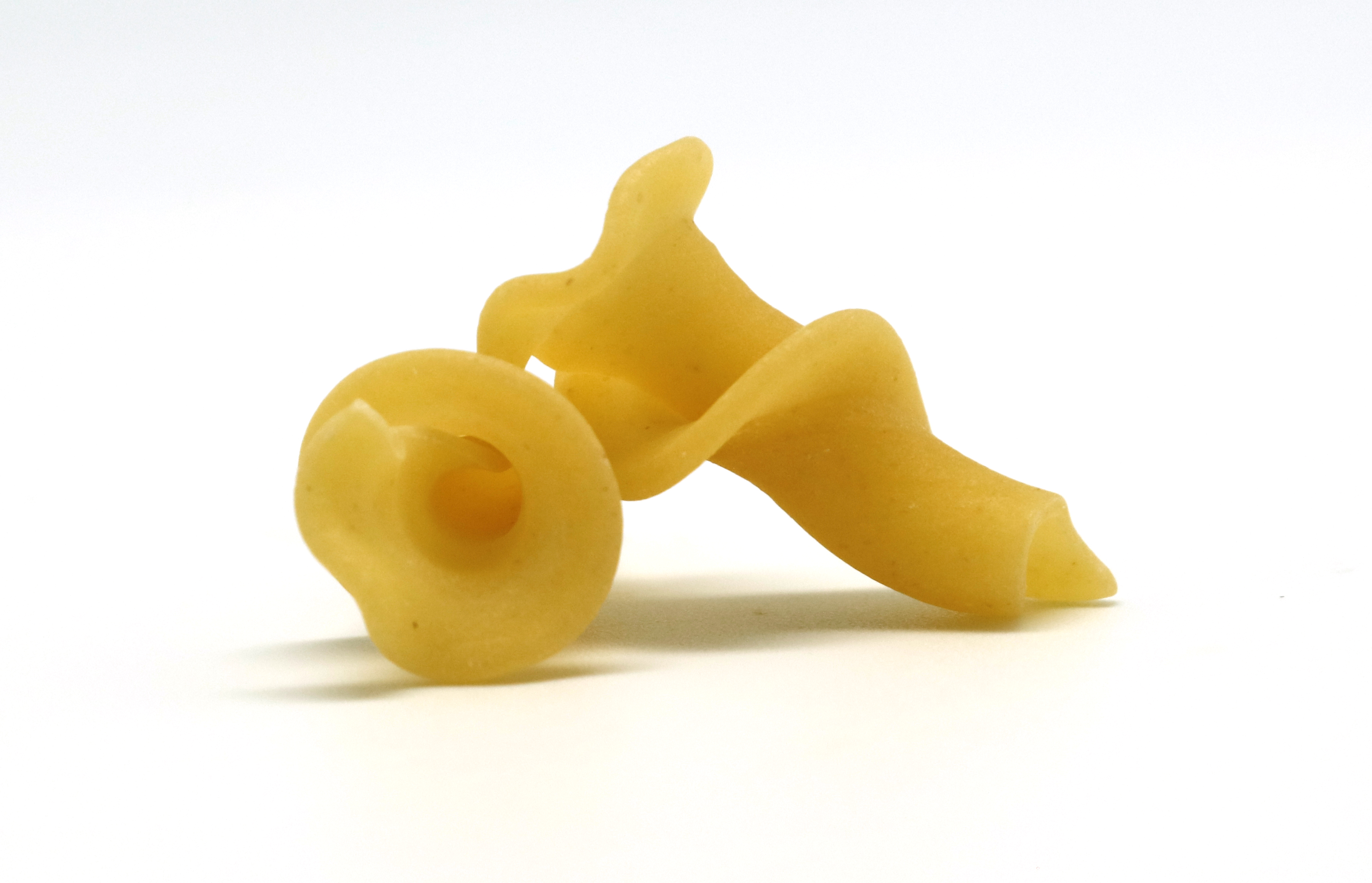
- Alternative names: Torchio, gigli, cornetti, corni di bue
- Type: Pasta
- Place of origin: Italy
- Main ingredients: Wheat

Campanelle (Italian: [kampaˈnɛlle]; Italian for 'bellflowers' or 'little bells') is a type of pasta which is shaped like a cone with a ruffled edge, or a bell-like flower. It is also sometimes referred to as gigli ('lilies') or trompetti ('trumpets'). It is intended to be served with a thick sauce, or in a casserole.

== See also ==
Media related to Campanelle (pasta) at Wikimedia Commons The dictionary definition of campanelle at Wiktionary

- List of pasta
- La campanella – one of Franz Liszt's Grandes études de Paganini
