= Sacchettoni =

Type of pasta

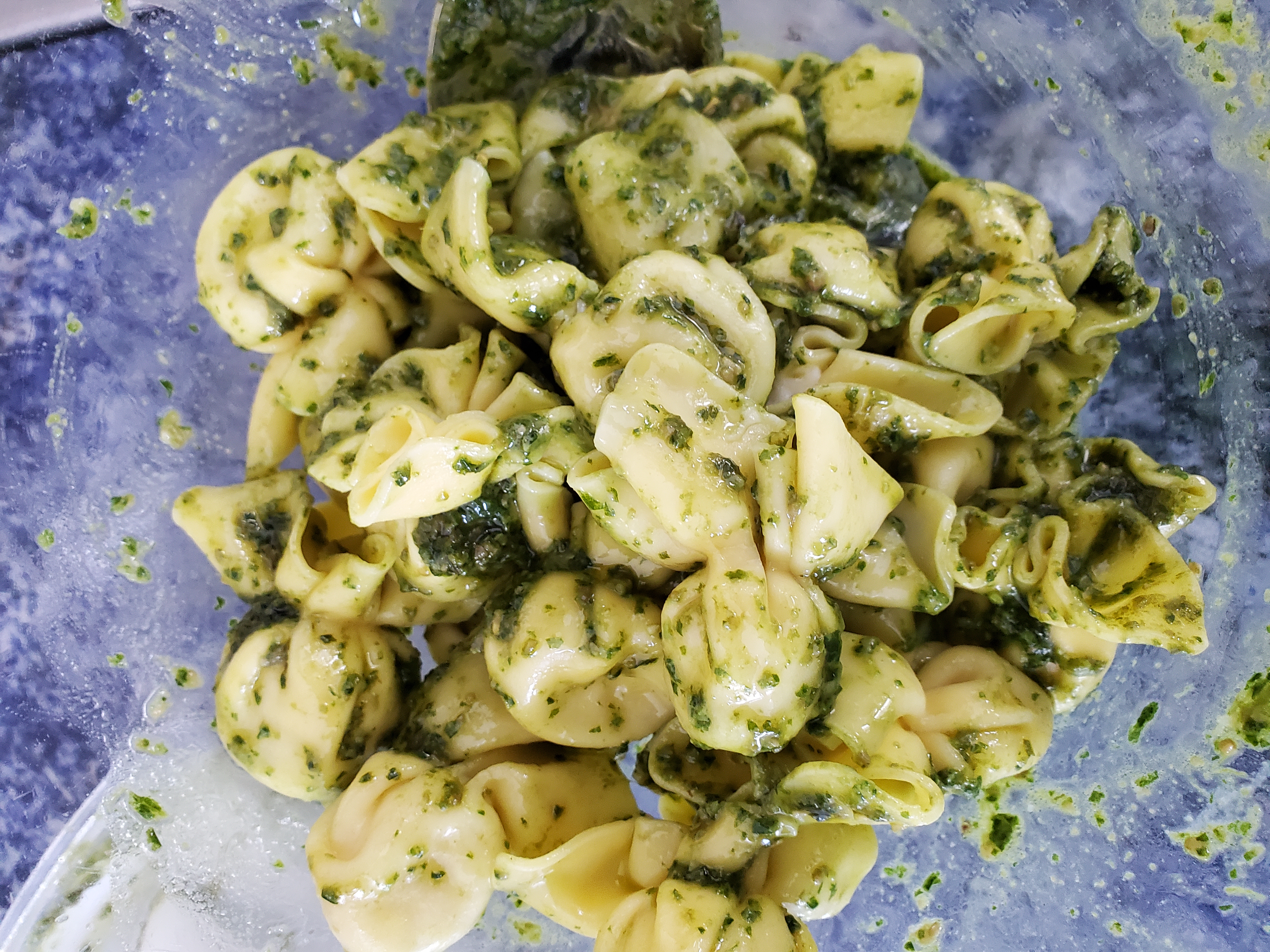
- Sacchettoni with pesto
- Alternative names: Sacchetti
- Type: Pasta
- Place of origin: Italy

Sacchettoni (Italian: [sakketˈtoːni]) is a type of stuffed pasta also known as "beggar's purse". It consists of small circles or squares of pasta filled like ravioli, then fastened at the top like a small bag.

== See also ==
- List of pasta
