= Sagnarelli =

Type of pasta

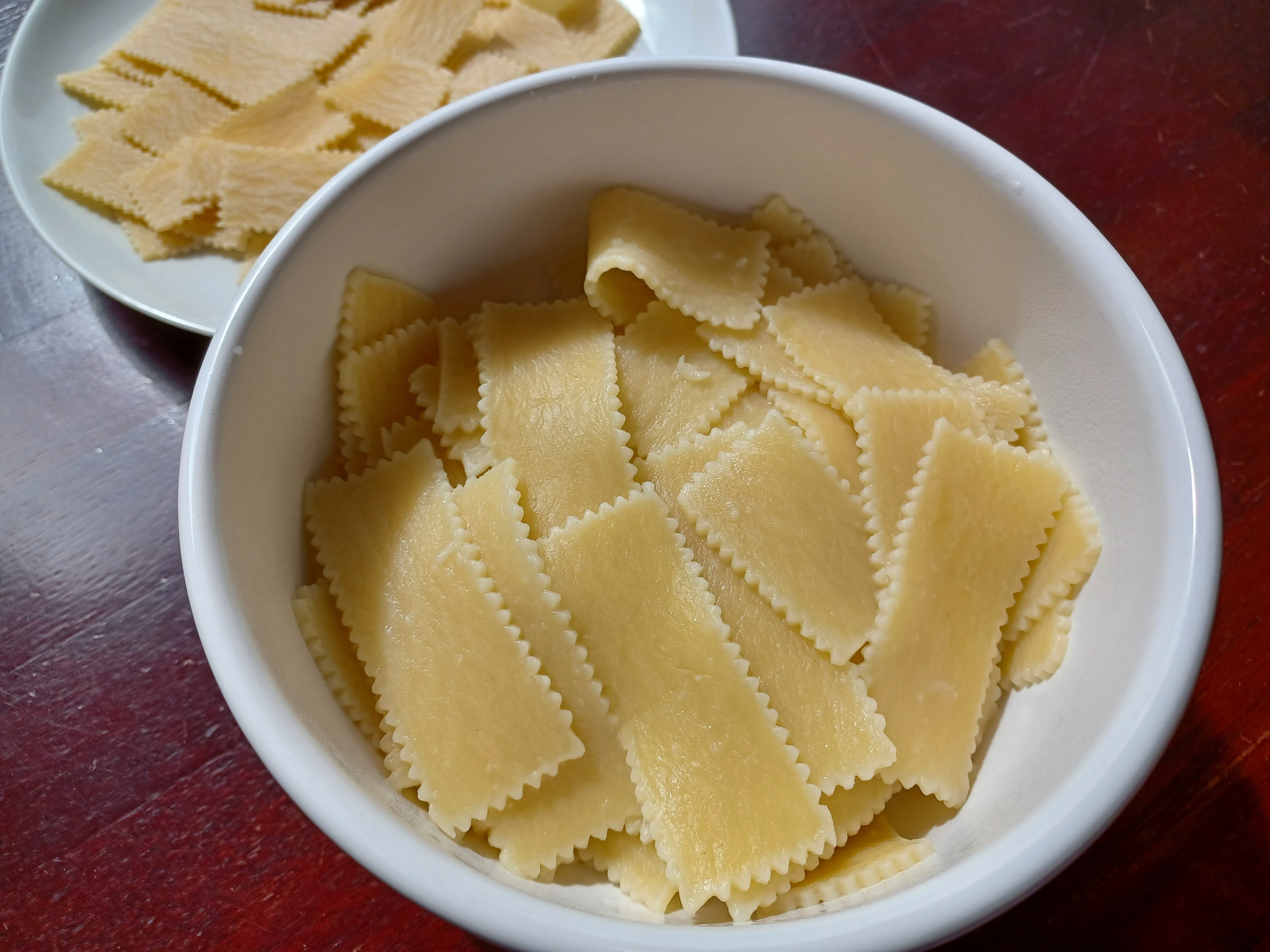
- Type: Pasta
- Place of origin: Italy

Sagnarelli ([saɲɲaˈrɛlli]) are a type of ribbon pasta originating in the Abruzzo region of Italy. They are rectangular ribbons with fluted edges.

The British chef and restaurateur Yotam Ottolenghi proposes sagnarelli with wild broad beans and lemon. He prepares the sauce using (apart from the beans) butter, shallots, white wine, olive oil, lemon juice, spices, and pecorino sheep's milk cheese.

Other suggestions include a white wine and mushroom ragout with the pasta; and asparagus and peas in a sauce with saffron and cream.

== See also ==
- List of pasta
