= Occhi di lupo =

Type of tubular pasta

- Type: Pasta
- Place of origin: Italy

Occhi di lupo (Italian: [ˈɔkki di ˈluːpo]; lit. 'wolf eyes') is a variety of large-sized, tubular stuffed pasta, served with a stuffing or filling, whose ingredients typically include extra virgin olive oil, ricotta and pistachios, or grated pecorino cheese, and aromatic herbs such as parsley and basil.

Another recipe, by actress Lisa Ann Walter, calls for "minced turkey, minced prosciutto, onion and brown mushrooms with olive oil and "a bit of butter" that is cooked together in white wine to make sauce. The pasta is stuffed with the mixture and layered with gruyere cheese, cream and butter over each layer."

== See also ==
- List of pasta
