= Sedani =

Type of pasta

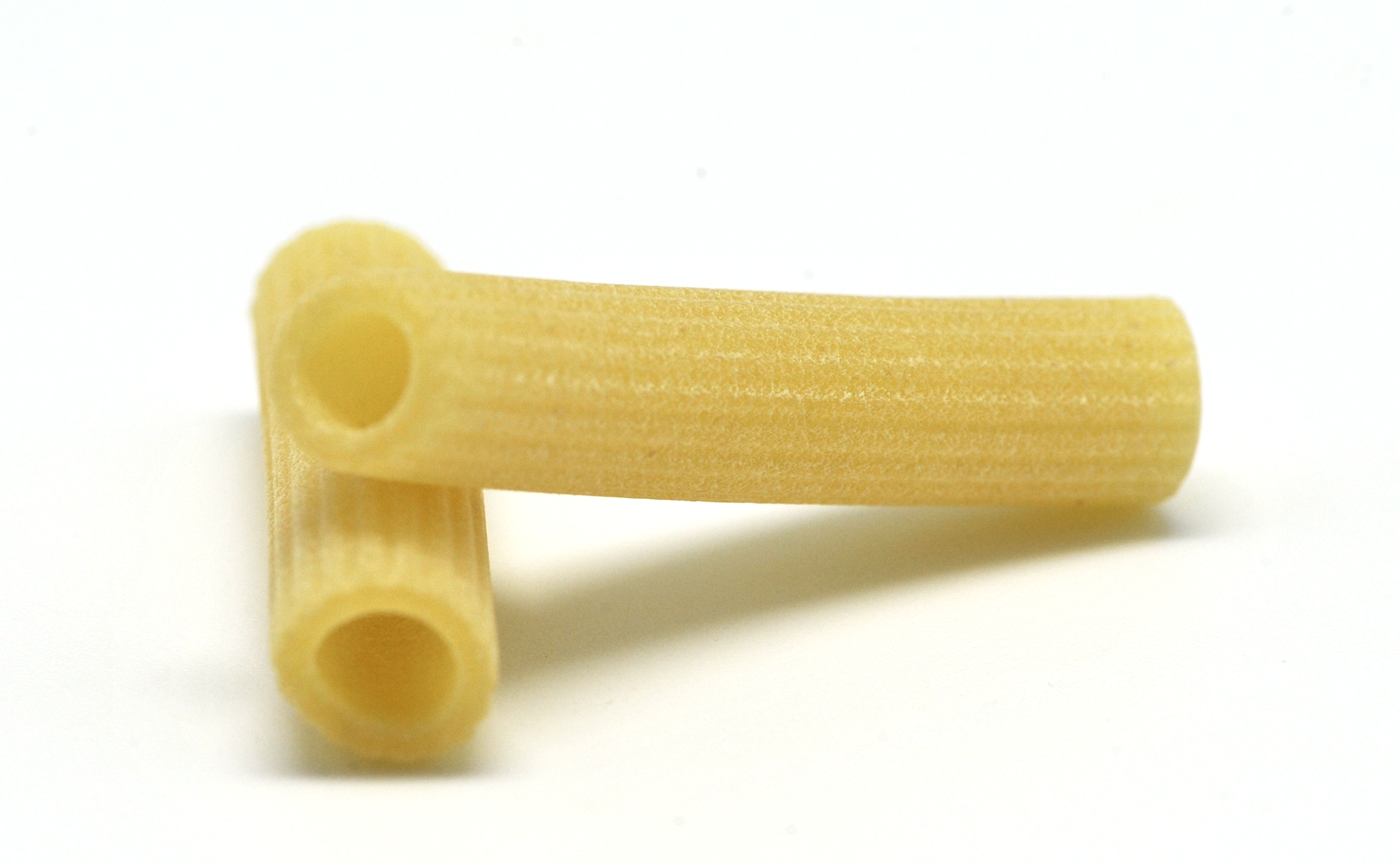
- Sedani rigati
- Alternative names: Sedanini, cornetti, diavoletti, diavolini, folletti; or zanne d'elefante if smooth.
- Type: Pasta
- Place of origin: Italy
- Main ingredients: Durum wheat, water
- Variations: Sedanini

Sedani is a type of pasta slightly larger than macaroni, with a similar slight bend. They can be smooth (lisce) or furrowed (rigati).

Initially named zanne d'elefante (lit. 'elephant tusks'), they were renamed sedani (from sedano, meaning 'celery') after the trade of ivory was banned.

== See also ==
- List of pasta
