= Calamarata =

Type of pasta

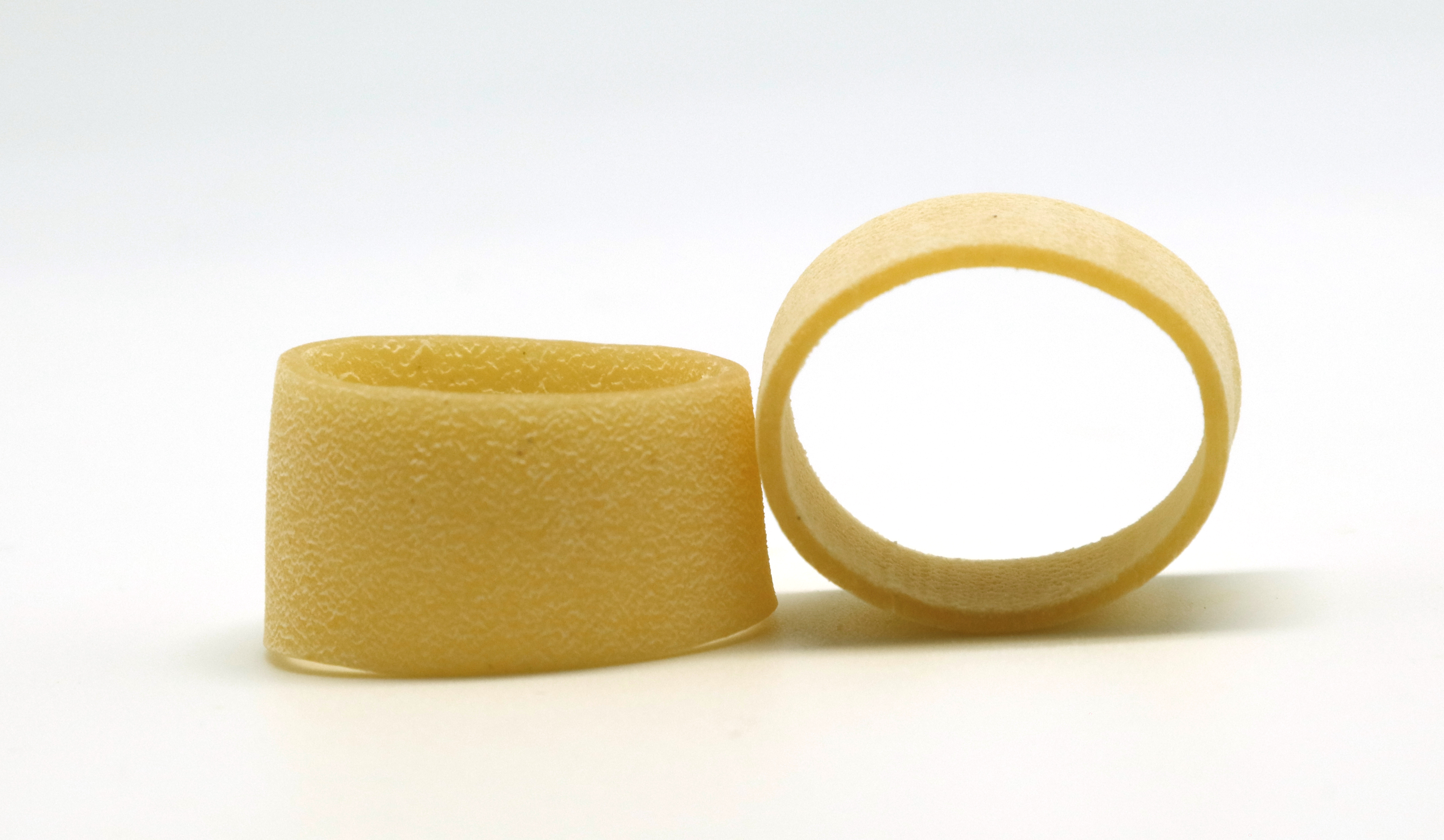
- Type: Pasta
- Place of origin: Italy
- Region or state: Naples, Campania

Calamarata is a type of thick ring pasta, often dyed with black squid ink to resemble sliced calamari.

== See also ==
Media related to Anelloni at Wikimedia Commons

- List of pasta
