= Conchiglie =

Type of pasta

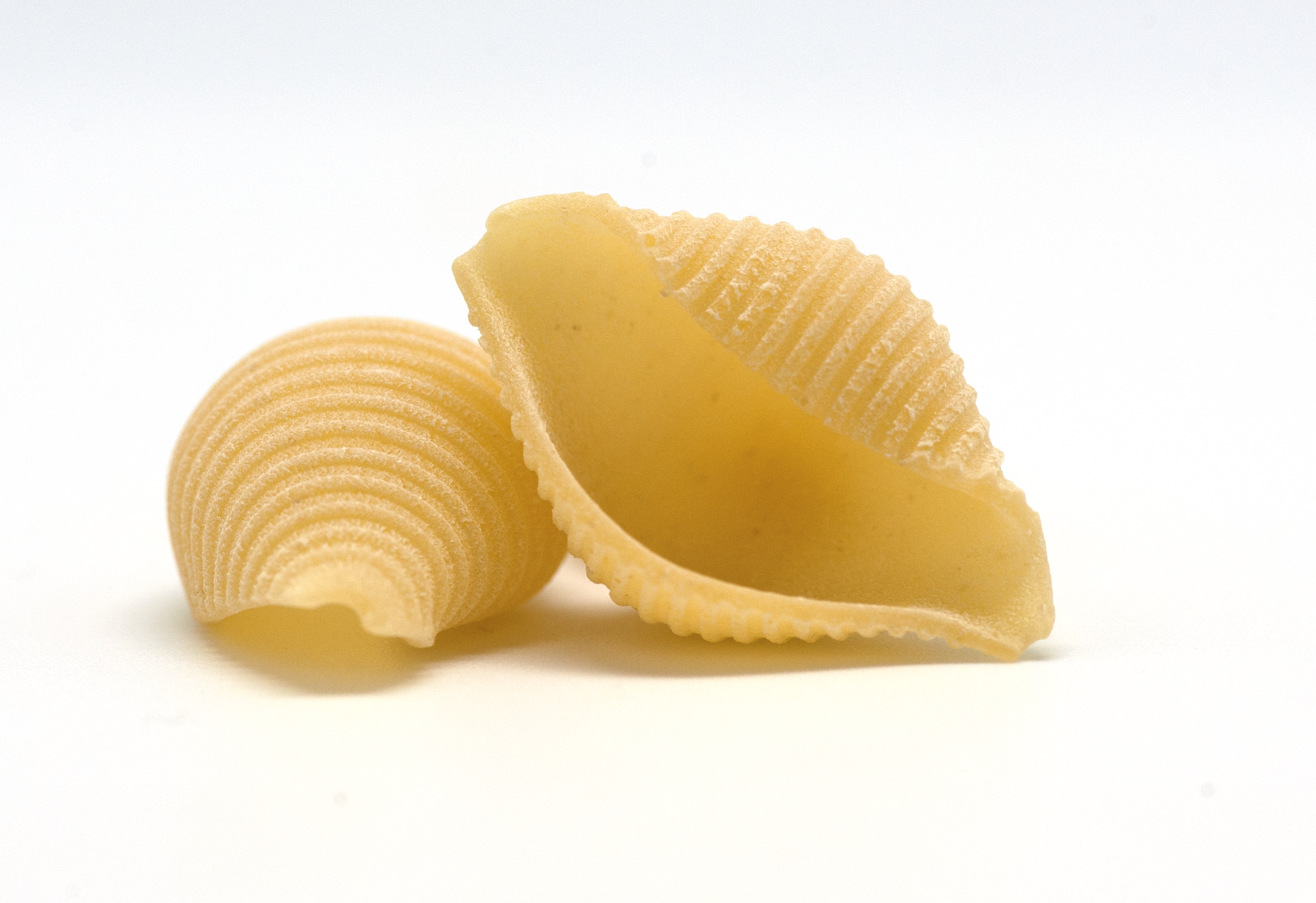
- Conchiglie rigate
- Alternative names: Shells, seashells
- Type: Pasta
- Place of origin: Italy
- Main ingredients: Durum wheat flour, possibly natural colour (tomato or spinach extract, squid ink)
- Variations: Conchigliette; Conchiglioni

Conchiglie (Italian: [koŋˈkiʎʎe]) are a type of pasta. They are usually sold in the plain durum wheat variety, and also in colored varieties which use natural pigments, such as tomato extract, squid ink or spinach extract. The shell shape of the pasta allows the sauce to adhere to it. There is a larger variation known as conchiglioni, and a miniature version called conchigliette.

Conchiglie are claimed to have been traced back to southern Italy, where they were traditionally made using durum wheat semolina.

== Etymology ==
The name derives from the Italian word for 'seashell', conchiglia. The Italian word conchiglie and the English word conch share the same Greek root in the form of κοχύλι (kochýli), meaning 'shell'.

== Controversy ==
In 2021, long-standing Italian pasta manufacturer La Molisana launched an advertisement for several pasta shapes including conchiglie. In the campaign, conchiglie was called by its historic name, abissine, named after Benito Mussolini's fascist occupation of Abyssinia (now Ethiopia). Following online backlash including a statement from the National Association of Partisans, La Molisana apologised, temporarily withdrew the pasta shapes promoted by the campaign, and changed their marketing to refer to the pasta shape as conchiglie.

== See also ==
Media related to Conchiglie at Wikimedia Commons

- List of pasta
