= Maccheroni alla molinara =

Type of pasta

- Maccheroni alla molinara with tomato sauce
- Type: Pasta
- Course: Primo (Italian course)
- Place of origin: Italy
- Region or state: Abruzzo

Maccheroni alla molinara (Italian: [makkeˈroːni ˈalla moliˈnaːra]) or alla mugnaia (Italian: [ˈalla muɲˈɲaːja]) is an uneven, long and thick fresh pasta, hand-pulled to a diameter of about 4–6 mm.

== History ==
The history of this pasta dates back to the 14th century coinciding with the construction of watermills on the River Fino. Back then it was presented to Robert of Anjou, King of Naples, when he visited the area.

== Preparation ==
It is made using only water and durum wheat flour. The pasta is characteristic of the province of Teramo and Pescara, Abruzzo.

These are manufactured by working the dough until it gets a hole in its center. The process requires trained hands that, facing one another, are able to slip into the hole to knead the dough in a circle.

This pasta remains relatively unknown since it is typically served only in homes and at festivals, and it represents a dying trait even in Abruzzo.

== See also ==
- List of pasta
