= Fagottini =

Type of pasta

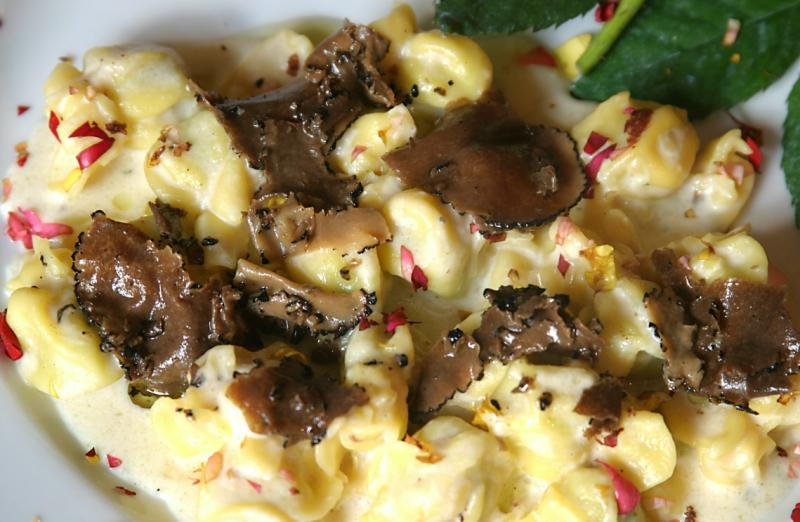
- Type: Pasta
- Place of origin: Italy

Fagottini (Italian: [faɡotˈtiːni]; lit. 'little bundles'; singularly, fagottino) is a filled pasta. It is usually filled with vegetables, typically steamed carrots and green beans, ricotta, onion and olive oil. Fagottini are made by cutting sheets of pasta dough into squares, placing the filling on the square, and folding the corners to meet in a point.

== See also ==
- List of pasta
