= Barbine =

Type of long pasta

- Type: Pasta
- Place of origin: Italy

Barbine (lit. 'little beards'; sg.: barbina) is a type of long strand pasta very similar to capellini. It is generally available in a coiled nest shape.

During the Renaissance, barbine were considered the epitome of culinary art because they are very difficult to make so thin. Usually available in coiled nest form, they are typically served in a broth or with a light sauce.

== See also ==
- Capellini
