= Lorighittas =

Type of pasta from Sardinia

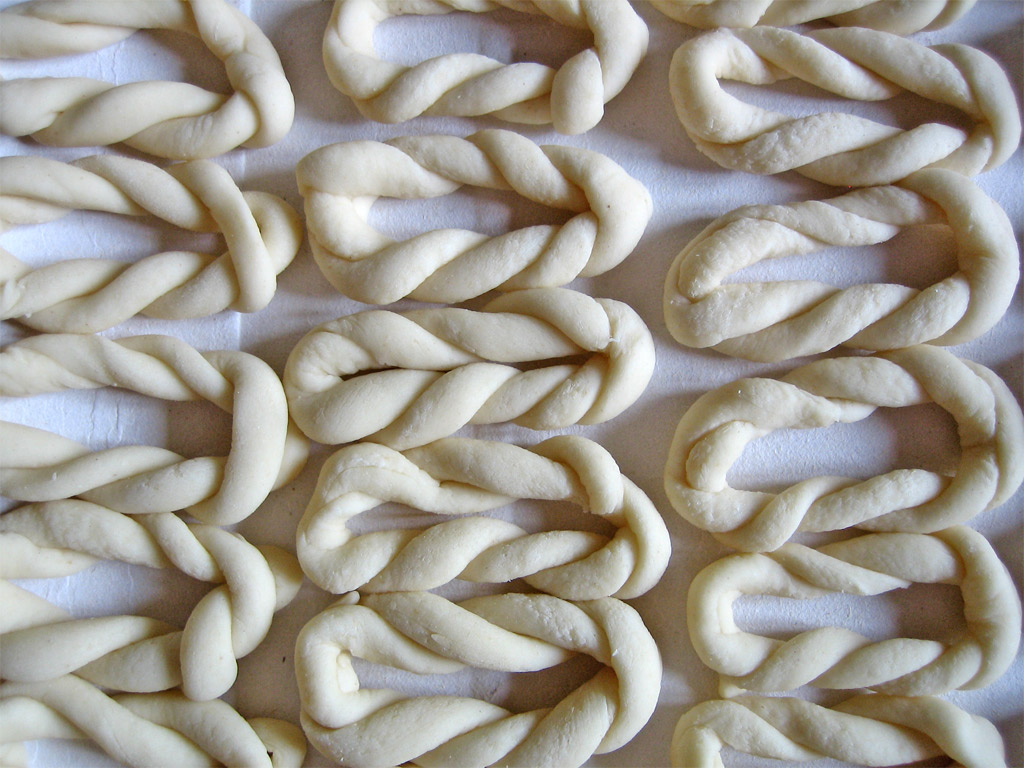
- Lorighittas sardi
- Type: Pasta
- Course: Primo piatto
- Place of origin: Italy
- Region or state: Morgongiori, Sardinia
- Main ingredients: durum wheat, water

Lorighittas ("small rings" in Sardinian) are a type of pasta typical of the village of Morgongiori at the foot of Monte Arci in Sardinia. They are recognized as a traditional food and thus carry the P.A.T. label in Italy.

They are typically seasoned with free-range chicken and tomato sauce or with simple tomato sauce.

== Preparation ==
They are prepared by hand by twisting a double string of dough between the fingers to create a closed braid to form a ring (loriga, in Sardinian).

They were traditionally prepared for the feast of All Saints Day with semolina flour and water. To make 1kg of the pasta can take one person 3-4 hours.

== Promotion ==
In recent years, successive municipalities have adopted policies to promote lorighittas. They have been represented at various important exhibitions and fairs, including the Terra Madre Salone del Gusto and the festive salon in Lugano. In addition, for more than ten years, the city administration has been organizing the Lorighittas festival in the first week of August with a free tasting of the famous pasta. This event has always been a great success with thousands of people who live in a small town at the foot of Monte Arci.

== See also ==
- Cuisine of Sardinia
