= Capellini =

Type of pasta

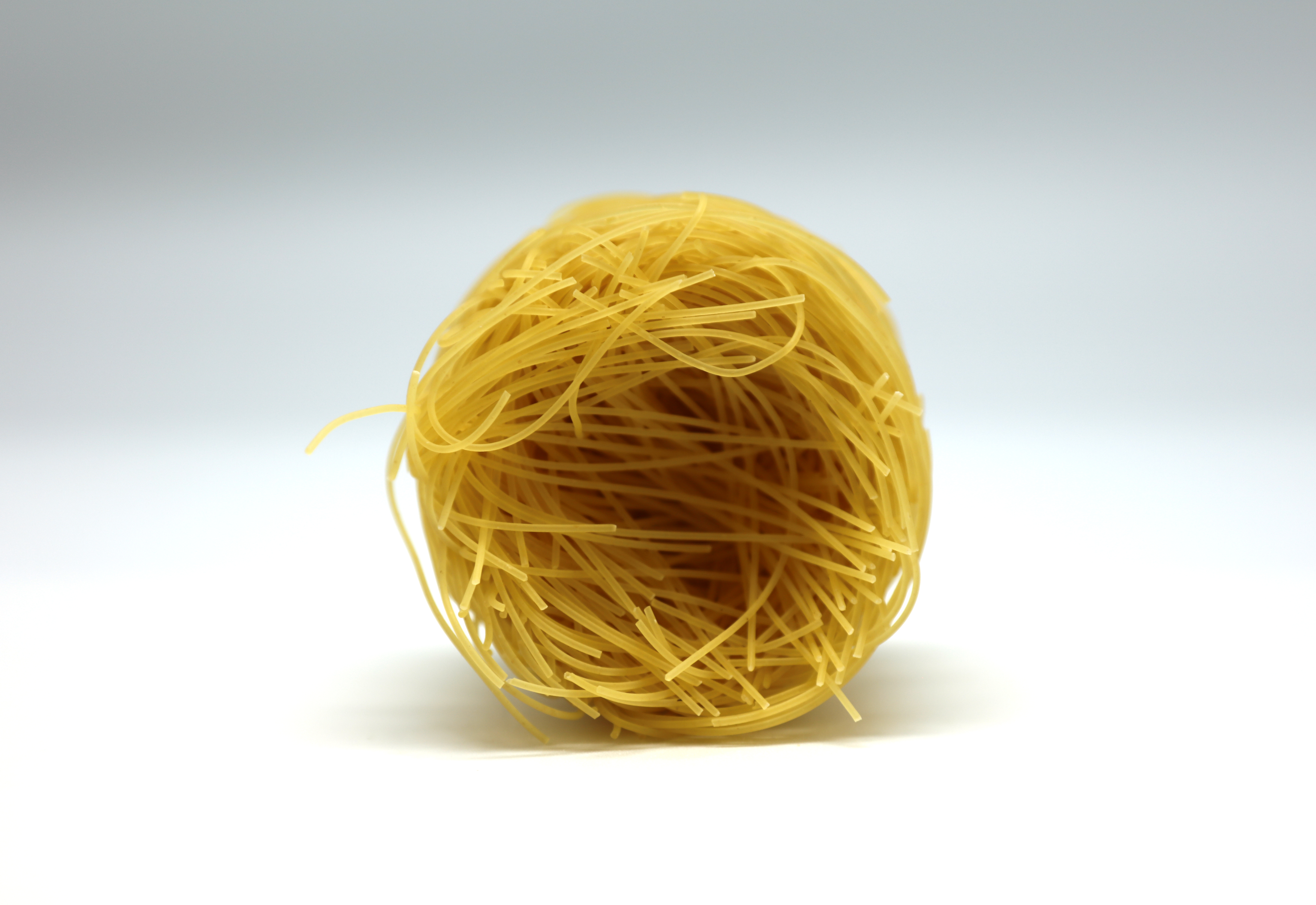
- Capelli d'angelo, front
- Type: Pasta
- Place of origin: Italy
- Main ingredients: Durum wheat
- Variations: Capelli d'angelo

Capellini (Italian: [kapelˈliːni]; lit. 'little hairs') is a thin variety of pasta, with a diameter ranging from 0.85 to 0.92 mm (0.033 to 0.036 in). It is made in the form of long, thin strands, similar to spaghetti. Capelli d'angelo (Italian: [kaˈpelli ˈdandʒelo], lit. 'angel hair'; hence, 'angel hair pasta' in English) is even thinner, with a diameter ranging from 0.78 to 0.88 mm (0.031 to 0.035 in). It is often sold in a nest-like shape.

Capelli d'angelo has been popular in Italy since at least the 14th century and is known for its delicate, light texture. Its thinness best suits it for soups or dishes with light sauces, such as those made with seafood or vegetables.

In the Campania region, the pasta is often served in a broth or with lentils.

== See also ==
Media related to Capellini at Wikimedia Commons Media related to Capelli d'angelo at Wikimedia Commons

- Cuisine of Liguria
- List of pasta
