= Mafaldine =

Type of pasta

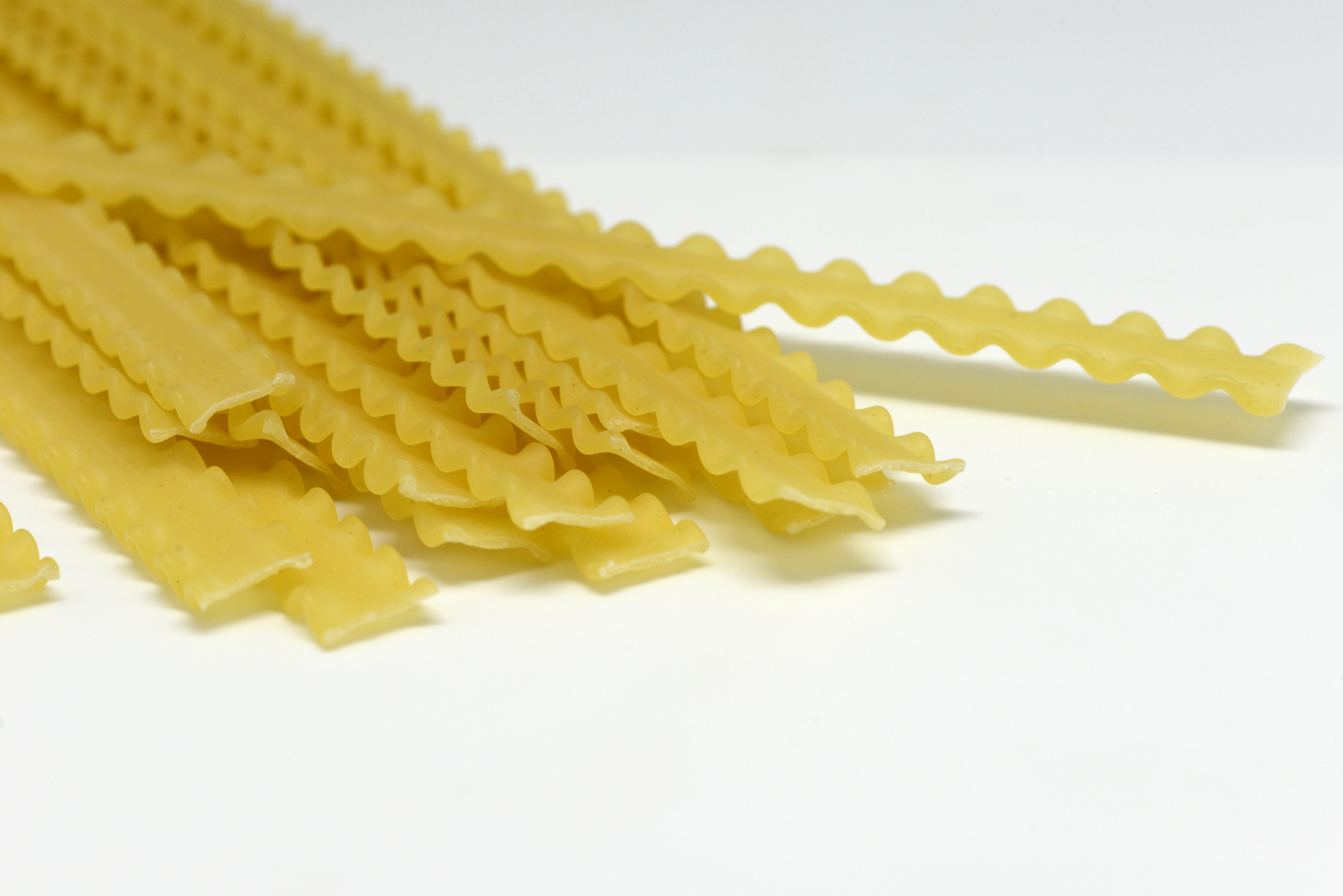
- Alternative names: Mafalde, reginette
- Type: Pasta
- Place of origin: Italy

Mafaldine, also known as reginette (Italian for 'little queens') or simply mafalde, is a type of ribbon-shaped pasta.

== History ==
It comes from the Naples area, where it was once called fettuccelle ricce. Mafaldine were named in honor of the birth of Princess Mafalda of Savoy (thus the alternative name "little queens").

Mafaldine is prepared similarly to other ribbon-based pasta such as linguine and fettuccine. It is flat and wide, usually about 1 cm (½ inch) in width, with wavy edges on both sides with a curl at the ends that remains well defined even after cooking.

== Tripoline ==
Tripoline (Italian: [tripoˈliːne]) is a type of ribbon pasta, similar to mafaldine. It is a thick ribbon ridged on one side, and is often found in baked pasta dishes.

It is believed that this pasta shape originated in the Campania region.

== See also ==
- List of pasta
