= Tortiglioni =

Type of pasta

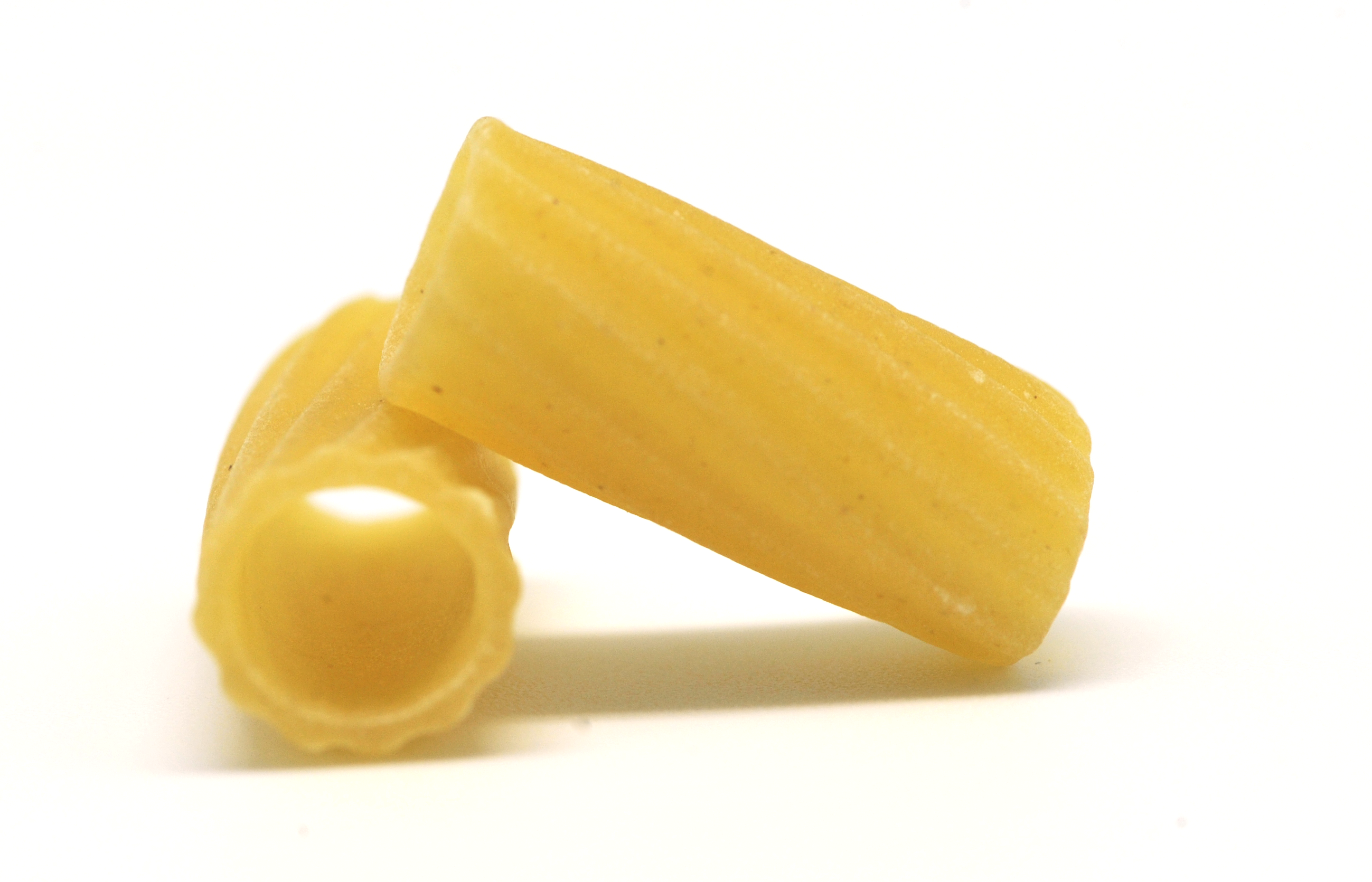
- Alternative names: Elicoidali
- Type: Pasta
- Place of origin: Italy
- Main ingredients: Durum wheat, water

Tortiglioni are a type of pasta similar to rigatoni, but larger and with deeper grooves which spiral around the pasta.

They take their name from the Latin word torquere, meaning 'to twist'. A tortiglione is a characteristic design from the lathe used in pasta manufacturing, with vertical ridges.
