= Fedelini =

Type of Pasta

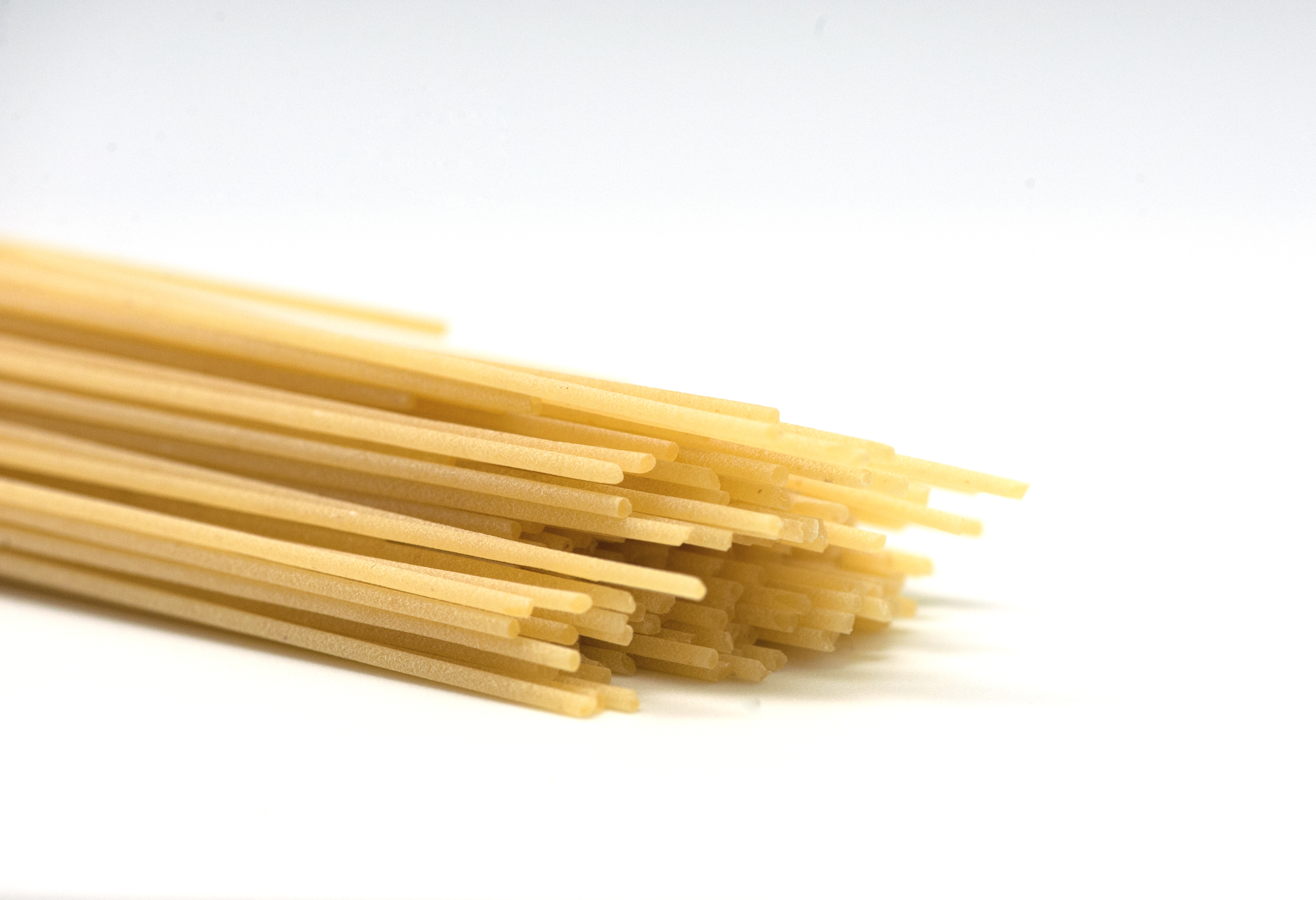
- Type: Pasta
- Place of origin: Italy
- Region or state: Liguria
- Main ingredients: Durum wheat semolina and Water

Fedelini or fidelini are a long, thin pasta shape, similar to spaghetti but thinner.

== History ==
The origin of the name of this pasta shape is unknown, however the term may derive from the Latin fides (strings) or fidiculæ (strings), while the Royal Spanish Academy derives the word fideo (in Castilian: pasta shaped like a thin rope) from the Mozarabic term fidāwiš (in Arabic فِدَاوِش), which in turn derives from Andalusian Arabic. Other philologists believe that the term derives from filelli and filellini as diminutives of filo.

=== Production ===
The production of fedelini has been known in Liguria since the 13th century, where macharoni and tria, also called fidej or fidelli, began to be produced, characterized by their thinness that distinguishes them from spaghetti. In 1574 the fidei producers founded the Corporation of Fidelari in Genoa, followed by the Art of Fidelari in 1577 in Savona.
