= Stringozzi =

Type of pasta

Stringozzi - Strangozzi
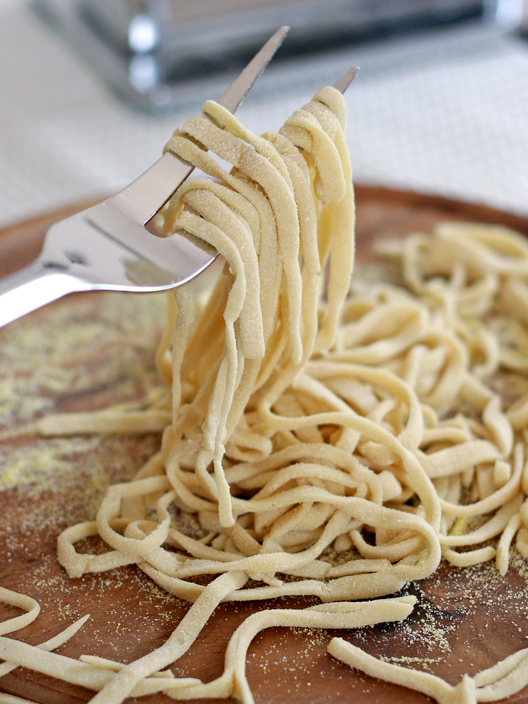
- Uncooked stringozzi
- Type: Pasta
- Place of origin: Italy
- Region or state: Umbria
- Main ingredients: Wheat flour

Stringozzi [striŋˈɡɔttsi] or Strangozzi [straŋˈɡɔttsi] is an Italian wheat pasta, among the more notable of those produced in the Umbria region. The long, rectangular cross-section noodles are made by hand and generally served with the local black truffles, a meat ragù or a tomato-based sauce. The name of the pasta is drawn from its resemblance to shoelaces, as stringhe is Italian for "strings".
