= Cavatappi =

Type of pasta

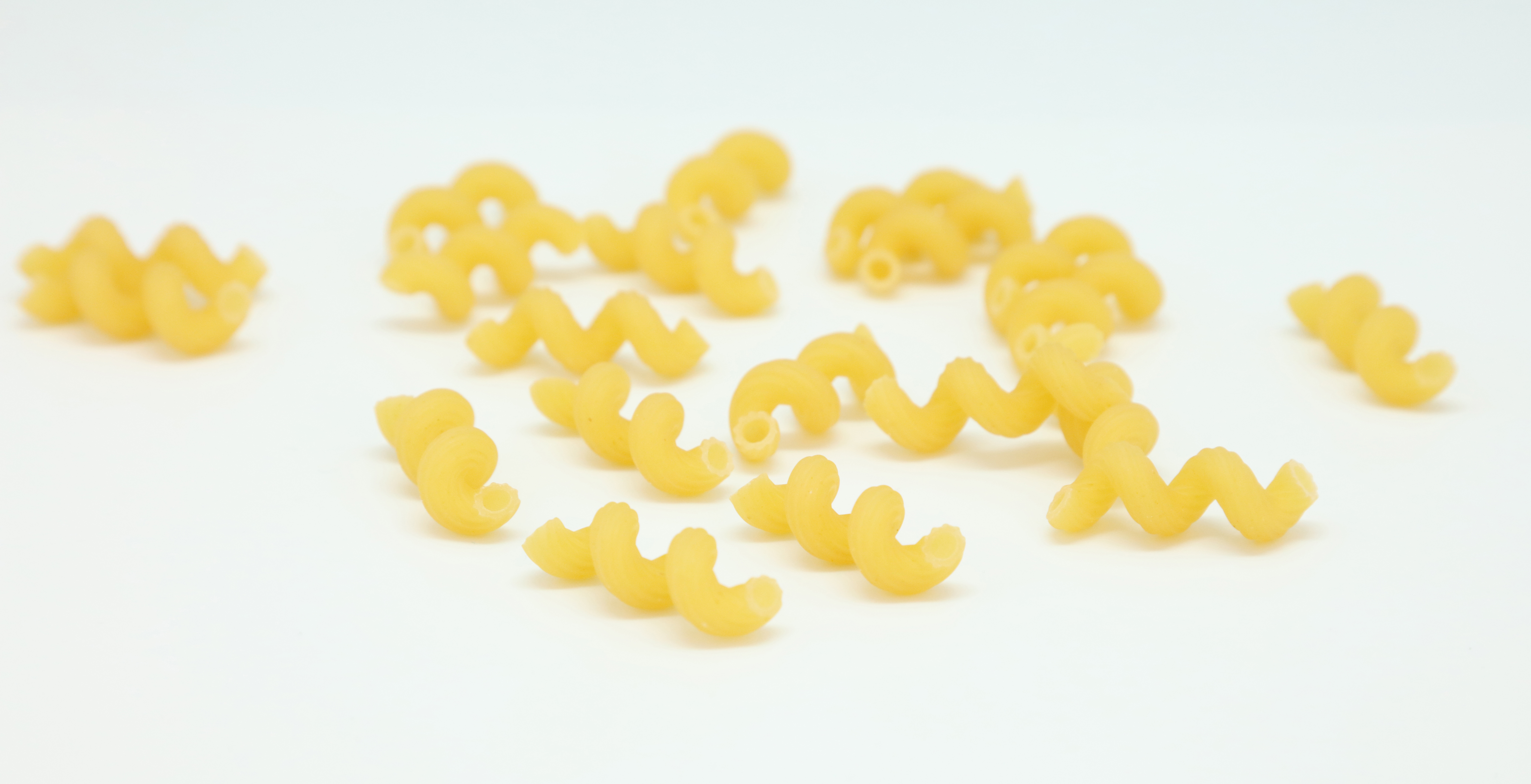
- Dried cavatappi
- Alternative names: Celentani, spirali, tortiglione, serpentini, amori, torselli, scoobi doo, double elbows
- Type: Pasta
- Place of origin: Italy

Cavatappi (Italian: [kavaˈtappi]; lit. 'corkscrews'), also known as spirali, cellentani, amori, fusilli rigati, or curly mac, is macaroni formed in a helical tube shape. Certain areas of the US and Canada may also refer to it as "double elbows" or "scoobi doo" pasta, purportedly because of their resemblance to scoubidou.

It should not be confused with fusilli, which, despite also being commonly referred to as "corkscrew pasta", is a different shape altogether—a flat twist, as opposed to cavatappi's hollow tube shape. Cavatappi is usually scored with lines or ridges (rigati in Italian) on the surface. It may be yellow in color, like most pastas, or have vegetables or a food coloring added to make it green or red. It can be used in a variety of dishes, including salads, soups, and casseroles.

== Etymology ==
Cavatappi is an Italian word created by compounding cava and tappi, which literally means 'stopper extractor' (a corkscrew). It is known by many other names.

== Origin ==
Cavatappi is a generic name adopted by other brands that imitated Barilla's cellentani. This particular shape was born in the 1970s at Barilla in Parma, when a set of pasta dies had been mistakenly made with a spiral (instead of straight) set of lines. These produced pasta in a spiral or spring (molla in Italian) shape. Barilla decided to name it after one of the most famous showpeople of the time, Adriano Celentano, who was nicknamed Il Molleggiato. As this name was trademarked by Barilla, other pasta producers had to use other names, such as cavatappi (lit. 'corkscrews').

== Shape ==
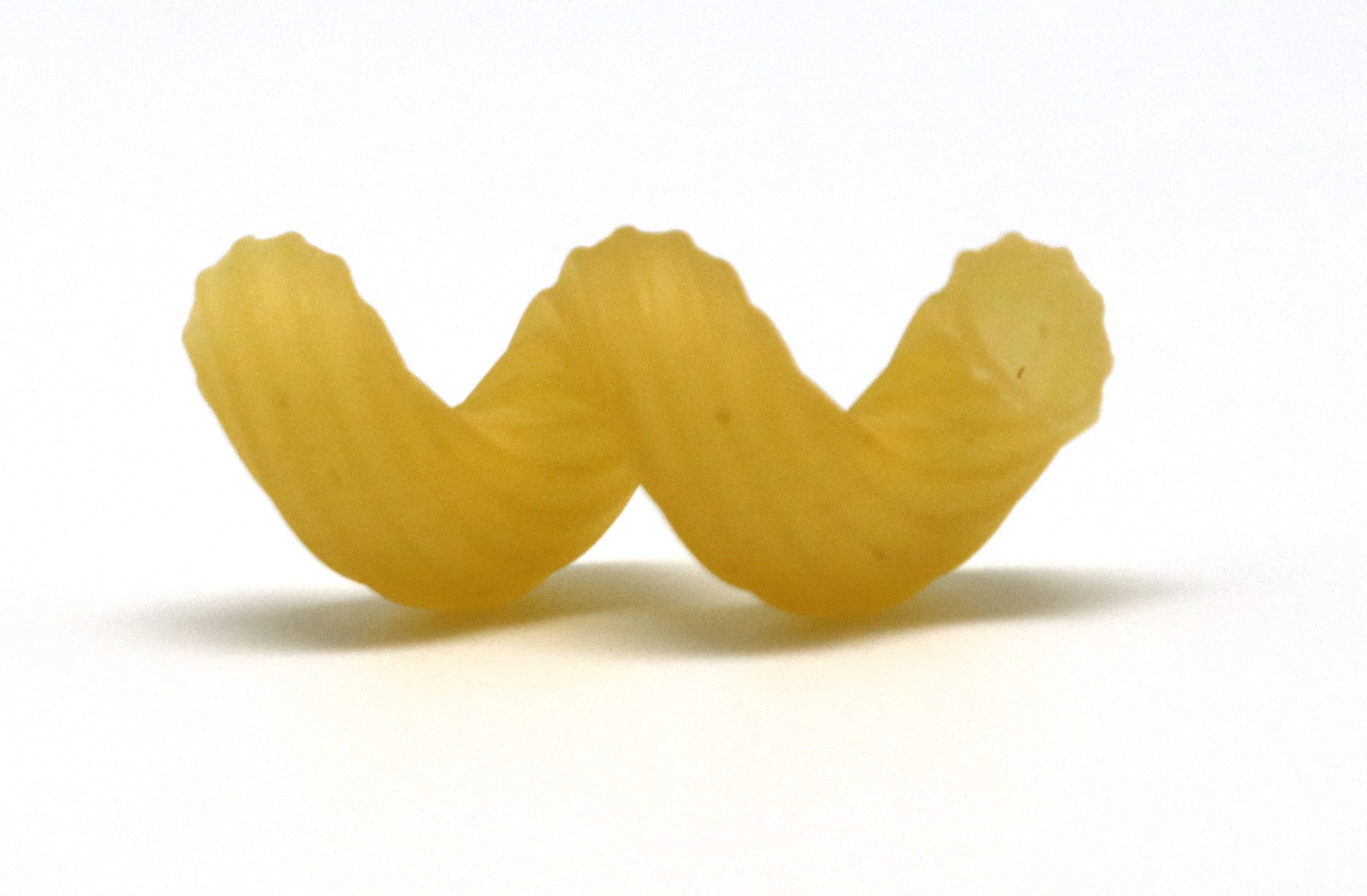
Cavatappi pasta shape

The cavatappi shape is perhaps best described as a ridged tube extruded into a helix shape through a small number of rotations. The number of turns is commonly in the range of one to three (with less than one full turn, the shape degenerates into a twisted version of elbow macaroni).

== Common recipes ==
Cavatappi is used with Italian-style foods, such as cavatappi all'amatriciana and cavatappi al pomodoro.

== See also ==
- List of pasta
