= Pastina =

Italian small pasta type for soup

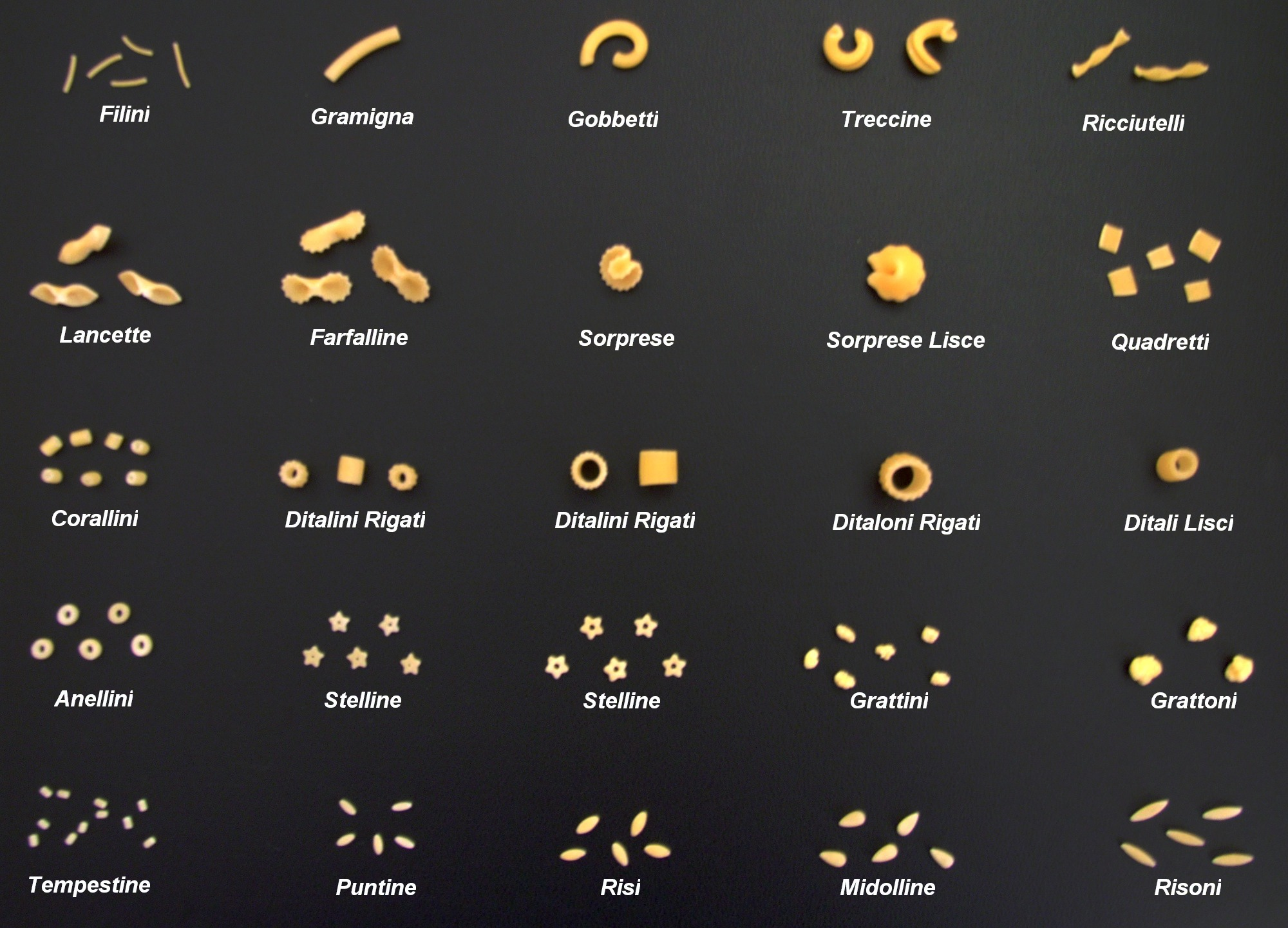
- Type: Pasta
- Main ingredients: Wheat flour

Pastina (lit. 'little pasta') is a variety of pasta consisting of tiny pieces, typically of a round (irregular) shape with a diameter of about two millimetres (1/16 inch). It is the smallest type of pasta produced. It is made of wheat flour and may also include egg. Pastina is a general term referring to many small shapes of pasta. It is used in many different ways in Italian cuisine, including as an ingredient of soup, desserts, infant food and also, alone, as a distinct and unique pasta dish.

It is also referred to as "Italian penicillin". Stanley Tucci's follow-up memoir "What I Ate in One Year (and Related Thoughts)" mentions in his book cooking pastina, "that Italian cure-all", for his son.

== See also ==
- List of pasta
- Acini di pepe
