= Rotelle =

Type of pasta

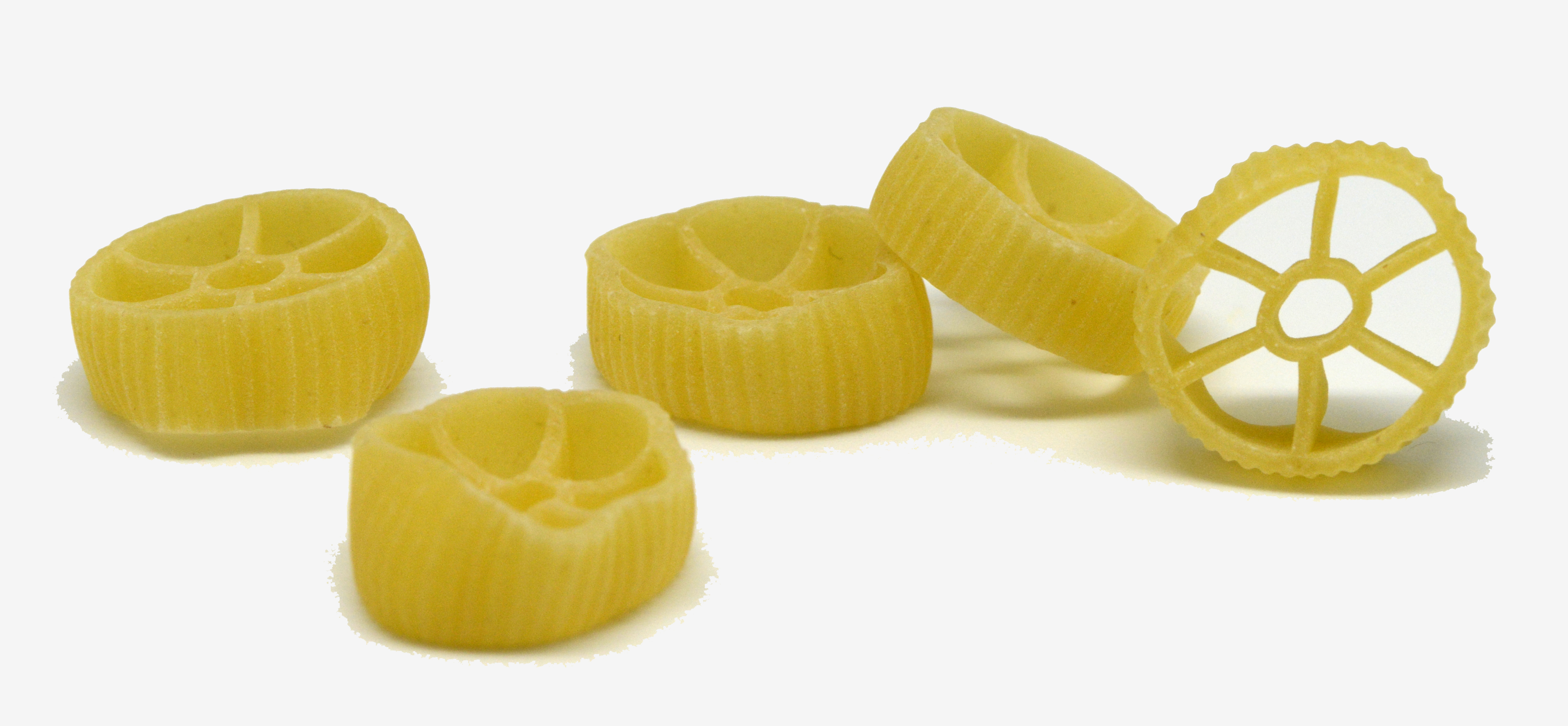
- Alternative names: Wagon wheels (United States), ruote (Italy), orange slices (American South)
- Type: Pasta
- Place of origin: Italy
- Main ingredients: Durum

Rotelle is a type of pasta resembling wheels with spokes. They are similar to fiori.

The name derives from the Italian word for a small wheel. In Italy they are also called ruote, and in the US they are often called "wagon wheels". They originated about 1900 in Italy, probably in Apulia. They have the advantage of maintaining their shape intact during cooking, without squashing.

There are various novelty pastas based on rotelle, where the pasta is not shaped as a wheel, but it is still a flat image that maintains its shape. Kraft Foods has made pasta in shapes that appeal to children for decades.

== See also ==
- List of pasta
