= Acini di pepe =

Type of pasta

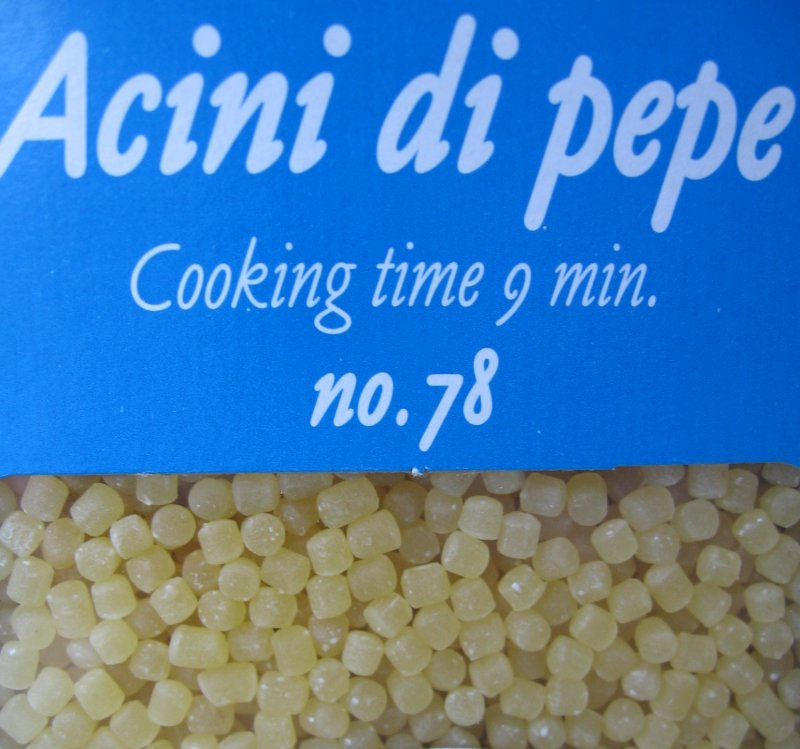
- Alternative names: Pastina
- Type: Pasta
- Place of origin: Italy

Acini di pepe (Italian: [ˈaːtʃini di ˈpeːpe]; lit. 'seeds of pepper') is a type of pasta. Acini is the plural of acino whose root is the Latin word acinus. In both Latin and Italian, the word means 'grape' or 'grape-stones', with the "stones of a grape" being the seeds of the grape. Acini di pepe then translates into 'seeds of a pepper'. It was and is known as a symbol of fertility, which is why it is used in Italian wedding soup. It is also sometimes referred to as pastina (lit. 'little pasta'); however, some pasta makers distinguish pastina as smaller than acini di pepe. The individual pieces usually resemble tiny cylinders about 1 mm, or less, in each dimension.

== See also ==
- Pastina
- Tarhonya
