= Anelli =

Type of pasta

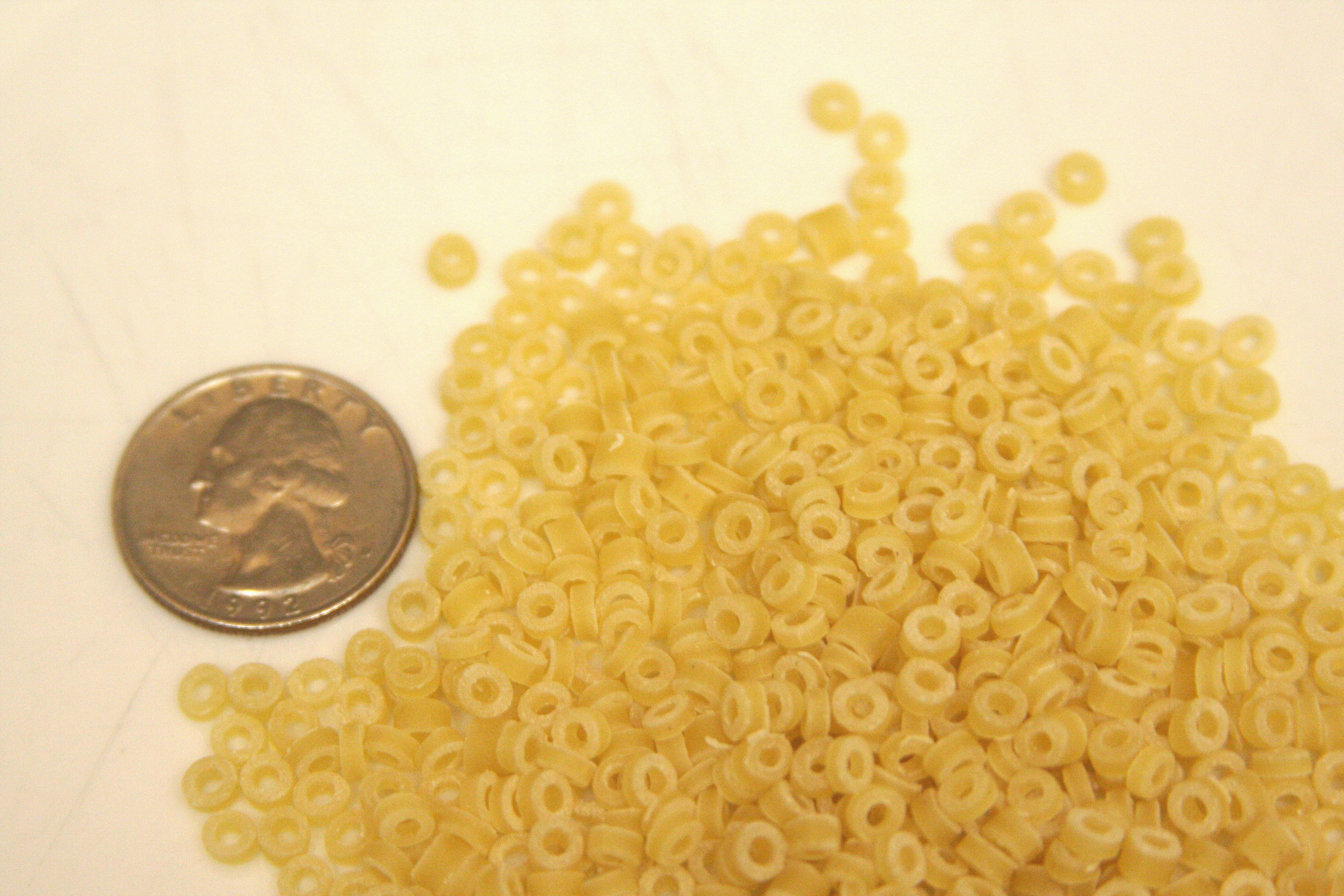
- Anellini pasta, uncooked
- Alternative names: Anellini, anelletti
- Type: Pasta
- Place of origin: Italy

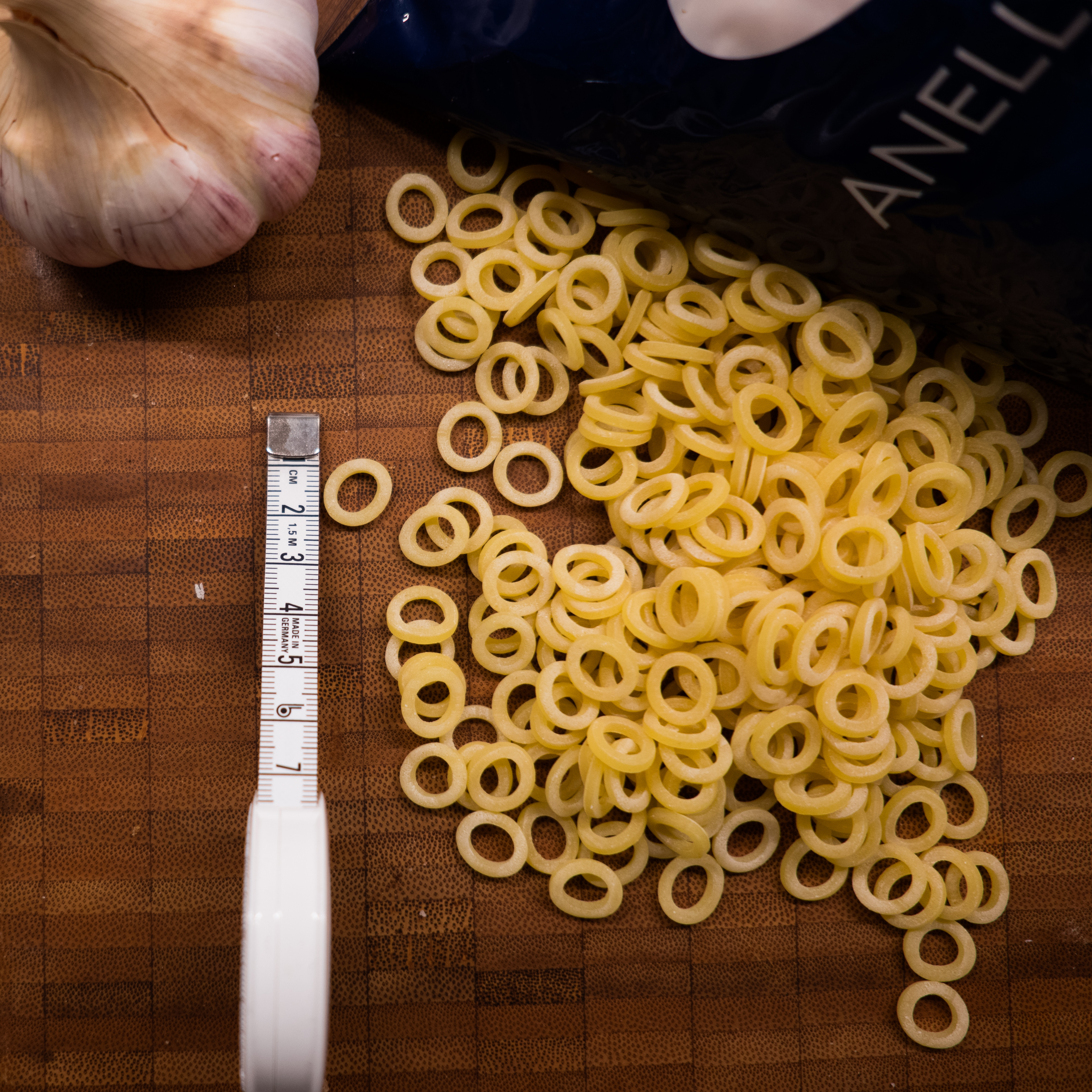
Anelli, 1–1.5 cm in diameter

Anelli (also known as anellini or anelletti) are small, thin rings of pasta. They are generally used for soups and pasta salads.

== See also ==
- SpaghettiOs

Media related to Anelli at Wikimedia Commons
