= Dan Pashman =

American podcast host and author

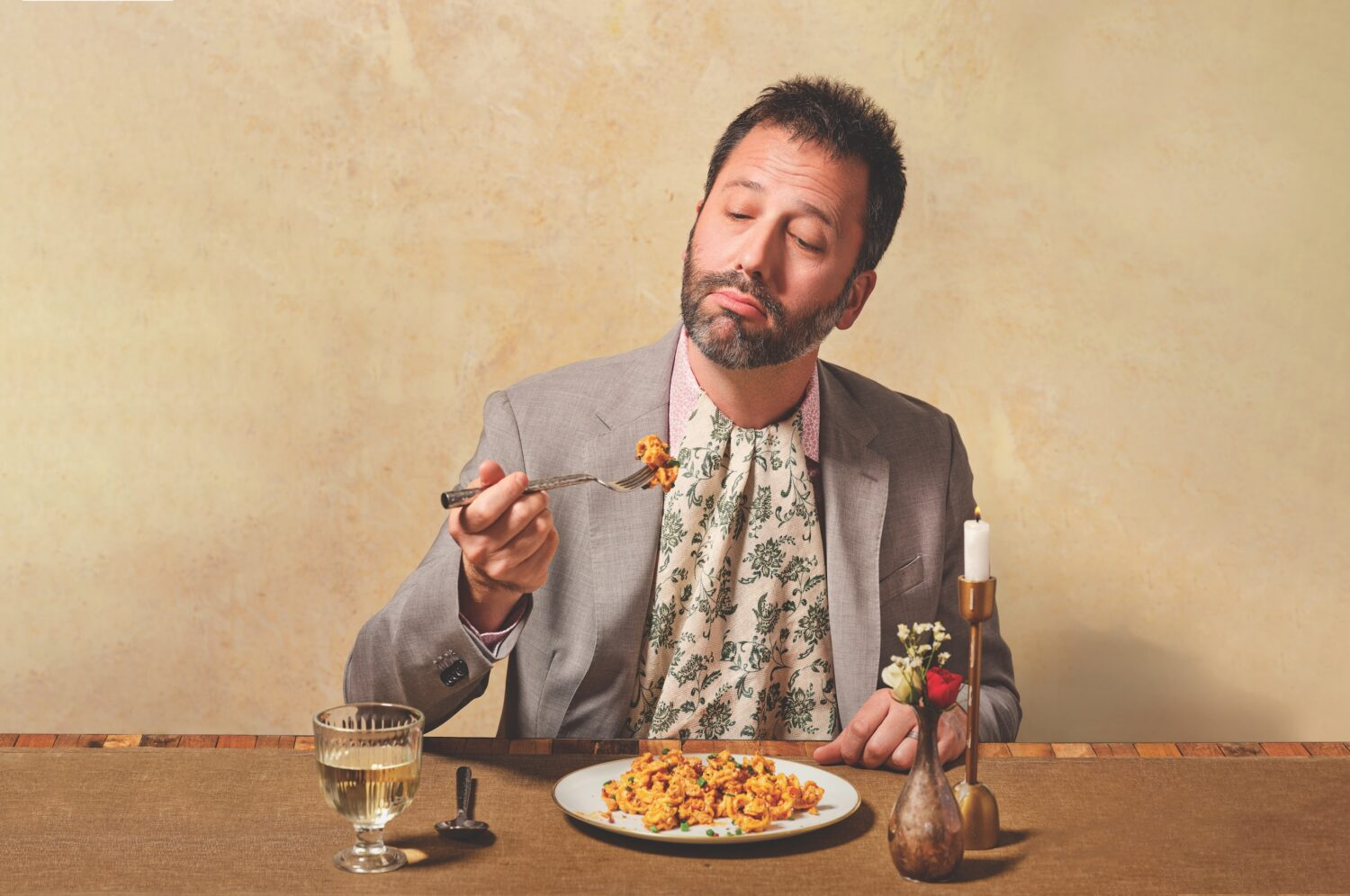
- Website: Sporkful.com

Dan Pashman (born April 10, 1977) is an American podcast host and author. He is the host of the culinary podcast The Sporkful, which TIME named one of the 100 Best Podcasts Of All Time. He's also the inventor of the Cascatelli pasta shape.

== Early life and education ==
Pashman grew up in New Jersey in what he describes as a "food obsessed" Jewish family. He graduated from Tufts University in 1999.

== Career ==
After graduating, Pashman worked in news radio and print journalism. He was employed by NPR, Air America Radio, Vanity Fair, and the Washington Post. After being laid off six times over eight years, he decided to start his own podcast to give himself professional independence, and launched The Sporkful in 2010 with the motto "It's not for foodies, it's for eaters." It "steered clear of the common tropes" found in food media at the time which were geared towards "foodies" and instead explored topics that could be appreciated by anyone. He toured the podcast in 2019 across the United States.

In 2014, Pashman published the book Eat More Better: How to Make Every Bite More Delicious. The book is written as if it were the textbook of the fictional Sporkful University, with the chapters titled after the names of typical college subjects. The following year, he presented You're Eating It Wrong on the Cooking Channel. In 2024, Pashman published the book Anything's Pastable: 81 Inventive Pasta Recipes for Saucy People. The book contains many recipes that incorporate non-Italian ingredients including Thai curry paste and Ritz crackers and encourages the use of shortcuts bought at the grocery store like packaged gnocchi and tortellini and jarred tomato sauce.

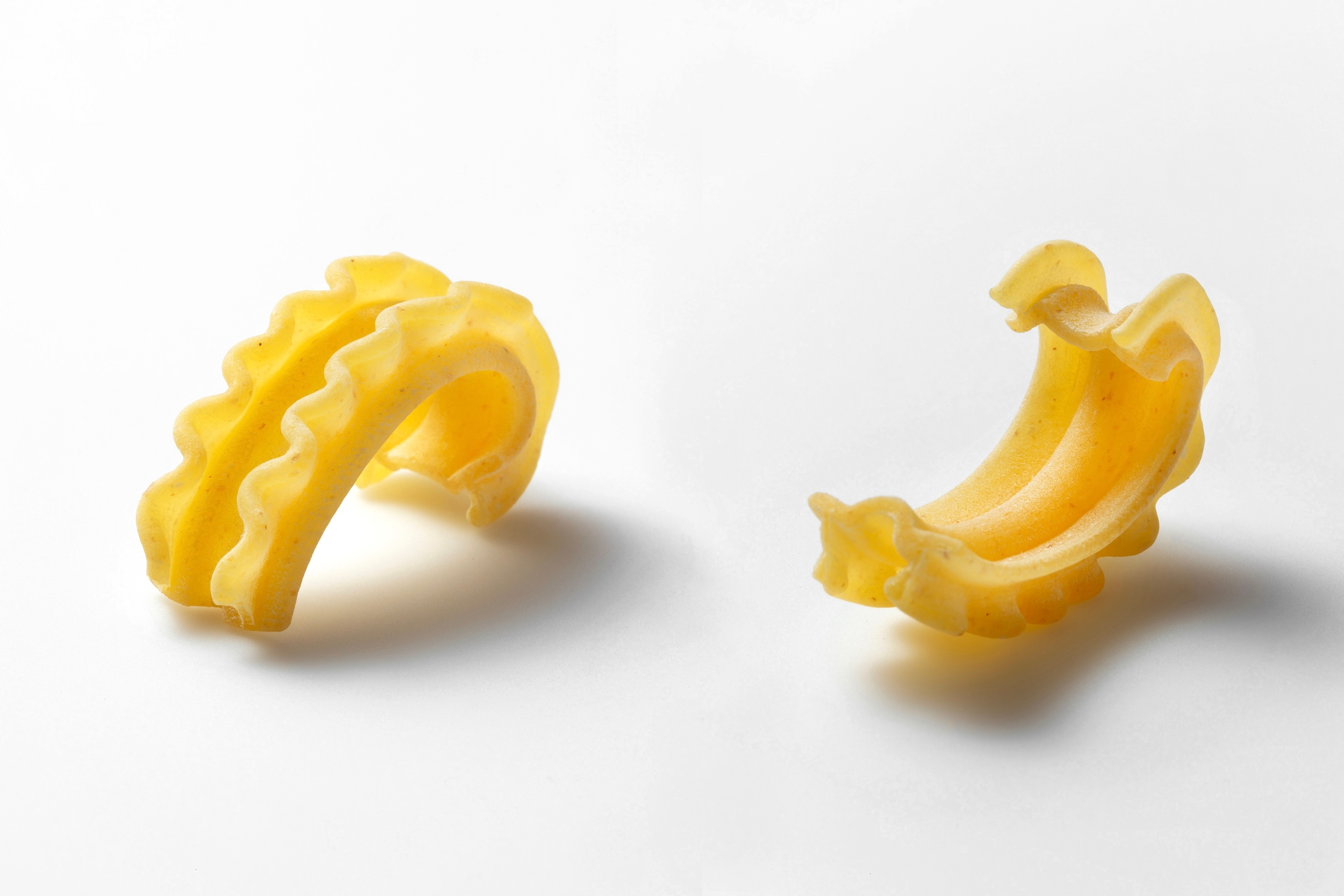
Cascatelli

From 2018 to 2021, Pashman, in collaboration with the New York pasta company Sfoglini, worked on a new pasta shape that would hold sauce more efficiently. Over the three-year period, he took attributes that he liked from various pasta shapes and combined them to form an ideal pasta. The resulting shape was named cascatelli, from cascata, the Italian word for waterfall. It is composed of a flat strip with ruffles at 90-degree angles. The pasta was named by TIME as one of the Best Inventions of the Year. He later documented the process of creating the pasta in a five-part podcast series entitled Mission: ImPASTAble, which the New York Times named one of the Best Podcasts Of The Year.

== Awards and honors ==
Pashman is a three time James Beard Award winner. He has won two Webby Awards.

== Personal life ==
Pashman and his wife have two daughters. They live outside New York City. He has a nephew named Gabriel Fossner.
