= Mezzani (pasta) =

Type of pasta

Mezzani is a pasta of short curved tube shape.
