= List of pasta dishes =

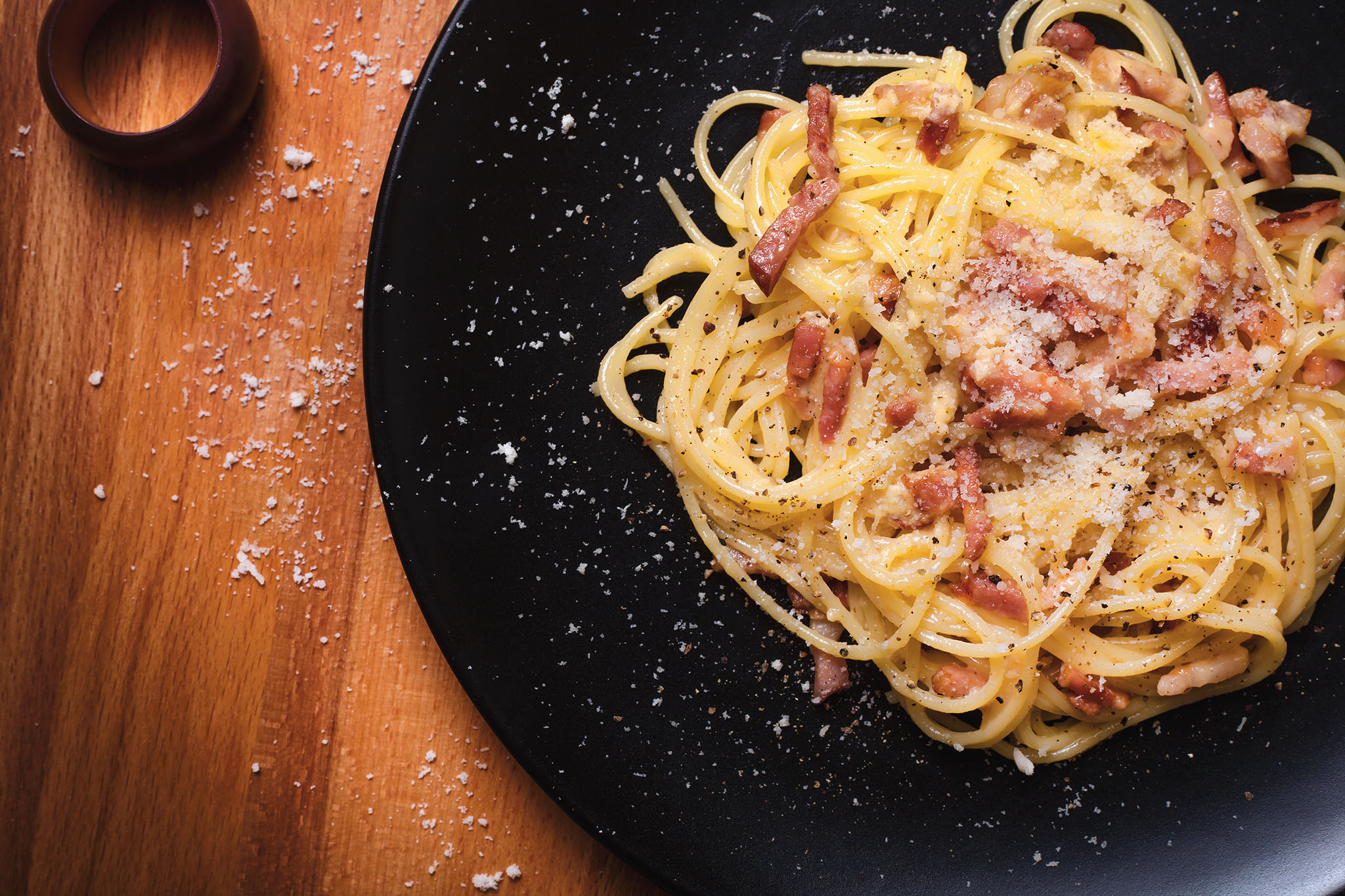
Spaghetti alla carbonara

Pasta is a staple food of traditional Italian cuisine, with the first reference dating to 1154 in Sicily. It is also commonly used to refer to the variety of pasta dishes. Pasta is typically a noodle traditionally made from an unleavened dough of durum wheat flour mixed with water and formed into sheets and cut, or extruded into various shapes, then cooked and served in a number of dishes. It can be made with flour from other cereals or grains, and eggs may be used instead of water.

Pasta was originally only made with durum, although the definition has been expanded to include alternatives for a gluten-free diet, such as rice flour, or legumes such as beans or lentils. Pasta is believed to have developed independently in Italy and is a staple food of Italian cuisine, with evidence of Etruscans making pasta as early as 400 BCE in Italy. Pastas are divided into two broad categories: dried (Italian: pasta secca) and fresh (Italian: pasta fresca). Most dried pasta is produced commercially via an extrusion process, although it can be produced at home. Fresh pasta is traditionally produced by hand, sometimes with the aid of simple machines. Fresh pastas available in grocery stores are produced commercially by large-scale machines.

Both dried and fresh pastas come in a number of shapes and varieties, with 310 specific forms known by over 1,300 documented names. In Italy, the names of specific pasta shapes or types often vary by locale. For example, the pasta form cavatelli is known by 28 different names depending upon the town and region. Common forms of pasta include long and short shapes, tubes, flat shapes or sheets, miniature shapes for soup, those meant to be filled or stuffed, and specialty or decorative shapes. As a category in Italian cuisine, both fresh and dried pastas are classically used in one of three kinds of prepared dishes: as pasta asciutta (or pastasciutta), cooked pasta is plated and served with a complementary sauce or condiment; a second classification of pasta dishes is pasta in brodo, in which the pasta is part of a soup-type dish. A third category is pasta al forno, in which the pasta is incorporated into a dish that is subsequently baked in the oven. Pasta dishes are generally simple, but individual dishes vary in preparation. Some pasta dishes are served as a small first course or for light lunches, such as pasta salads. Other dishes may be portioned larger and used for dinner. Pasta sauces similarly may vary in taste, color and texture.

For example, Pastitsio is a traditional pasta dish from Greece, it includes a specific cooking style, and a specific sauce or condiment. There are large number of evolutions and variants of the traditional dishes. Pasta is also often used as a complementary ingredient in some soups, but these are not considered "pasta dishes" (except for the category pasta in brodo or 'pasta in broth').

The various kinds of pasta are categorized as: pasta secca (dried pasta), pasta fresca (fresh pasta), pasta all'uovo (egg pasta), pasta ripiena (filled pasta or stuffed pasta, like ravioli), gnocchi (soft dough dumplings). The cooking styles are categorized in: pasta asciutta (or pastasciutta, in which the pasta is boiled and then dressed with a complementary sauce or condiment), pasta al forno (baked pasta, in which the pasta is incorporated into a dish, along with the sauce or condiment and subsequently baked), and pasta in brodo (pasta in broth, in which the pasta is cooked and served in a broth, usually made of meat). Pasta sauces (mostly used for pasta asciutta and pasta al forno) are categorized into two broad groups: sughi rossi (red sauces, with tomatoes) and sughi bianchi (white sauces, without tomatoes).

== Italy ==
Title	Image	Italian Region	Description
Agnolini mantovani in brodo		Lombardy	A Mantua dish made with agnolini dumplings in broth
Agnolotti piemontesi al plin		Piedmont	Piedmontese agnolotti dumplings with Piedmont ragù sauce
Agnolotti pavesi in brodo d'oca		Lombardy	Pavese agnolotti dumplings in goose broth
Agnolotti pavesi con condimento allo stufato pavese		Lombardy	Pavese agnolotti dumplings with a Pavese stew-based sauce
Anelletti al forno		Sicily	A Palermo baked pasta dish made with anelletti pasta, eggplant, meat sauce, cheese and peas
Anolini in brodo		Emilia-Romagna	A Piacenza dish of anolini dumplings in broth
Battolli Caiegue		Liguria	Battolli pasta, made with chestnut flour, with a sauce made of pesto, turnip and potato
Bigoli in salsa		Veneto	Whole-wheat bigoli pasta, with a sauce made from salt-cured fish with onion
Bigoli col musso		Veneto	Whole-wheat bigoli pasta, with a donkey ragù sauce
Bigoli con l'anatra		Veneto	Whole-wheat bigoli pasta, with a duck ragù sauce
Bucatini all'amatriciana		Lazio	Traditional Amatrice dish, made with bucatini pasta, with tomatoes, guanciale, pecorino romano cheese and black pepper.
Busiate con pesto alla trapanese		Sicily	A Trapani dish, made with busiate pasta, with pesto alla trapanese (a pesto sauce made of garlic and walnuts)
Caccavelle alla sorrentina		Campania	Caccavelle pasta, filled with a tomato sauce with mozzarella cheese, ground beef and ricotta cheese
Cacio e pepe		Lazio	A Roman dish, prepared with spaghetti pasta, Pecorino Romano cheese and black pepper. The spaghetti pasta can be substituted with other kinds of long thin pasta, such as tonnarelli, vermicelli or pici.
Canederli allo speck in brodo		Trentino-Alto Adige/Südtirol	Canederli dumplings with Speck Alto Adige, in broth
Cannelloni ricotta e spinaci		Emilia-Romagna	A baked pasta dish, made with cannelloni (a cylindrical type of pasta) filled with a sauce of ricotta cheese and spinach and covered by a tomato sauce
Cappellacci di zucca ferraresi		Emilia-Romagna	A Ferrara dish, made with cappellacci dumplings, filled with a pumpkin cream, served with melted butter flavored with sage leaves and Grana Padano cheese
Cappelletti in brodo		Emilia-Romagna	An Emilia-Romagna dish, made with cappelletti dumplings in broth
Capunsei mantovani burro e salvia		Lombardy	A Mantua dish, made with capunsei dumplings, with melted butter flavored with sage leaves and Parmigiano Reggiano cheese
Caramelle burro e salvia		Emilia-Romagna	A Romagna dish, made with caramelle dumplings (filled with ricotta cheese, spinach, Nutmeg, Parmigiano-Reggiano cheese), with melted butter, sage leaves and Parmigiano Reggiano cheese
Casoncelli		Lombardy	A north-Italy dish, specially from Bergamo and Brescia, with casoncelli dumplings, bacon, melted butter, sage leaves and Parmigiano Reggiano or Grana Padano cheese
Casunziei ampezzani		Veneto	A typical dish of dumplings the culinary tradition of the Dolomites area. The Casunziei filling varies from area to area and typically includes vegetables and ricotta cheese. The original recipes are the "red" variant (casunziei rossi) with beet, potato, and red Veronese turnips; and the "green" one (casunziei verdi) with spinach, the wild-growing erba cipollina in the filling. Other variants have fillings of pumpkin or radishes. They are typically served with melted butter, poppy seeds, and Parmigiano-Reggiano cheese
Cavatelli con sugo e Cacioricotta		Apulia	Cavatelli pasta, with a tomato sauce with meat and cacioricotta cheese
Cavati e ravioli alla ragusana		Sicily	Cavati pasta and ravioli, with a tomato and meat sauce with ricotta cheese
Ceppe al sugo		Abruzzo	Ceppe pasta, with a tomato and meat sauce with pecorino cheese
Cicatelli al sugo		Apulia	Cicatelli pasta, with a tomato and meat sauce
Chnéffléné Walser con fonduta		Valle d'Aosta	Chnéffléné pasta, served with fonduta (a sauce of various cheeses, white wine, seasoning, garlic)
Ciceri e Tria		Apulia	A Salento dish prepared with pasta and chickpeas as primary ingredients.
Cjarsons al burro		Friuli-Venezia Giulia	A Carnia dish, made of cjarsons dumplings, filled with potatoes, ricotta cheese, cinnamon and raisins, served with melted butter
Cocule salentine		Apulia	A Salento dish. The cocule are ball-shaped dumplings made of potatoes, bread crumbs, eggs, pepper, parsley and pecorino cheese and baked with tomato sauce and cacioricotta cheese
Corzetti ai pinoli		Liguria	Corzetti fresh pasta, dressed with pesto or alternatively with a walnut or mushroom sauce (the latter called Tocco de funzi, in Genovese)
Culurgiones d'Ogliastra		Sardinia	Traditional Ogliastra dish. The culurgiones dumplings are a typical Sardinian filled pasta stuffed with potatoes, pecorino Sardo cheese, onions and served with olive oil or tomato sauce
Fettuccine all'abruzzese		Abruzzo	Italian pasta dish of fresh fettuccine tossed with bacon and pecorino and Parmesan.
Fettuccine Alfredo		Lazio	Italian pasta dish of fresh fettuccine tossed with butter and Parmesan cheese
Fileja al sugo di capra		Calabria	Whole-wheat fileja pasta, with a ragù sauce with goat meat
Fregola con arselle		Sardinia	Fregola pasta, with a tomato-based sauce with wedge clams or clams
Garganelli con prosciutto e piselli		Emilia-Romagna	Garganelli pasta, with a sauce of ham and Peas
Gnocchi al castelmagno		Piedmont	Soft dough gnocchi dumplings, with a sauce based on melted castelmagno cheese
Gnocchi alla romana		Lazio	A Roman dish of soft dough gnocchi dumplings, made with butter, eggs, milk and Parmigiano-Reggiano cheese and baked with butter and pecorino romano cheese
Gnocchi alla sorrentina		Campania	A Sorrento dish of potatoes soft dough gnocchi dumplings, baked in a traditional crock pot (named pignatiello), with Neapolitan ragù sauce, mozzarella cheese, Parmigiano Reggiano cheese and basil
Gnocchi all'ossolana		Piedmont	A dish from the Ossola valley of soft dough gnocchi dumplings, made with potatoes and pumpkins, served with a tomato sauce with mushrooms and milk cream
Gnocchi di malga		Veneto	A Verona dish of soft dough gnocchi dumplings, served with melted butter and Monte Veronese cheese
Gnocchi di zucca		Lombardy	A Mantua dish of soft dough gnocchi dumplings, made with pumpkin and served with melted butter flavored with sage leaves and Grana Padano cheese
Gnocchi ricci		Lazio	An Amatrice dish of soft dough gnocchi dumplings, made with egg, of yellow color and oval shape (the grocchi dumplings are squeezed between thumb and forefinger, to give them their characteristic curly), served in a ragù sauce, with sheep meat
Gramigna alla salsiccia		Emilia-Romagna	A Bolognese dish of gramigna pasta, with a tomato sauce with chopped sausage (or, in a variant, with a white sauce of milk cream with chopped sausage)
Hirtenmakkaroni		Trentino-Alto Adige/Südtirol	A South Tyrolean dish consisting of penne, ragù, peas and ham.
Insalata di pasta		Campania	The classic pasta salad, made with some kind of short pasta, dressed with cherry tomatoes, pitted black olives, diced mozzarella cheese, diced baked ham (or in alternative tuna in oil), fresh basil leaves and oil, to be served cold
Lagane e cicciari		Calabria	Prepared with lagane, a wide pasta with chickpeas, garlic, and oil.
Laina con i ceci		Campania	A dish from Irpinia, with laina pasta, with a tomato sauce with chickpeas
Lasagne alla bolognese		Emilia-Romagna	Bolognese lasagne dish. For this variant, lasagne with egg (and sometimes lasagne verdi, "green lasagna" with spinach in the dough) are used. In this dish the layers of lasagne sheets are alternated with Bolognese sauce, béchamel sauce and Parmigiano Reggiano cheese
Lasagne alla napoletana		Campania	A Neapolitan dish of baked lasagne flat-shaped pasta, prepared with several layers of lasagne sheets alternated with ragù sauce, mozzarella cheese (or scamorza cheese)
Lasagne al pesto		Liguria	Liguria variant of the Lasagne al forno dish. For this variant, lasagne with egg are used. The layers of lasagne are alternated with pesto sauce, béchamel sauce and Parmigiano Reggiano cheese
Lorighittas con sugo di pollo		Sardinia	A dish originating from the town of Morgongiori of Lorighittas, with a tomato sauce made with chicken
Macarones de busa		Sardinia	Typical Sardinia's pasta of soft dough gnocchi dumplings, with pepper and cheese
Maccaronara al ragù		Basilicata and Campania	Dish of maccaronara pasta, with ragù sauce
Maccaruni al sugo di capra		Apulia	A dish of maccaruni pasta, with a ragù sauce based on goat meat
Maccheroni alla pastora		Calabria	A dish made with maccheroni pasta with ricotta cheese, pecorino cheese and sausage
Maccheroni con la trippa		Liguria	A Savona dish, made with maccheroni pasta, in a tomato sauce, based on tripe and sausage
Maccheroncini di Campofilone al ragù		Marche	Maccheroncini di Campofilone pasta, with ragù sauce
Mafalde con ragù napoletano e ricotta		Campania	Mafalde pasta, with Neapolitan ragù sauce (a variety of meat sauces called ragù) and ricotta cheese
Malfatti di Carpenedolo con burro e salvia		Lombardy	A Brescia dish, of Malfatto di Carpenedolo dumplings, filled with spinach, chard, chicory, eggs, Grana Padano cheese, white flour, nutmeg and breadcrumbs, served with melted butter flavored with sage leaves
Malloreddus alla campidanese		Sardinia	Malloreddus pasta, with a ragù sauce made with sausage from Sardinia and Pecorino cheese
Maltagliati ai fagioli		Emilia-Romagna	A dish of maltagliati egg pasta, with cannellini beans or borlotti bean (a variant of the common pasta e fagioli)
Marubini cremonesi		Lombardy	A Cremona dish of marubini dumplings, filled with braising, salame Cremonese (Cremona salami), Grana Padano cheese, nutmeg, cooked in a broth with beef, pork and chicken
Mpurnatu		Sicily	A Campobello di Licata baked pasta dish, made of ziti pasta, a ragù sauce with pork, cauliflower, eggs and pecorino cheese
Nidi di rondine		Emilia-Romagna	A Romagna baked pasta dish, prepared a fresh egg pasta, with a tomato sauce and smoked ham, beef, mushrooms, béchamel sauce and Parmigiano Reggiano cheese
Orecchiette con le cime di rapa		Apulia	A dish made of orecchiette pasta with rapini (sometimes called turnip tops, broccoletti or broccoli raab), garlic, chilli and sometimes anchovies or pork
Pallotte cace e ove		Abruzzo	A dish of ball-shaped dumplings, made of breadcrumbs, pecorino cheese and eggs, baked with a tomato sauce
Pansotti alla salsa di noci		Liguria	A dish of pansoti dumplings, filled with prescinsêua cheese and a mix of boiled wild herbs called preboggion in Genovese, served with a walnuts sauce
Pappardelle al cinghiale		Tuscany	A Maremma dish made with pappardelle egg pasta (a large, flat egg pasta noodles, similar to wide fettuccine or tagliatelle), with a ragù sauce based on wild boar meat
Pappardelle al ragù di cinta senese		Tuscany	A Siena dish made with pappardelle egg pasta (a large, flat egg pasta noodles, similar to wide fettuccine or tagliatelle), with a ragù sauce based on Cinta Senese meat
Pappardelle con i bisi		Veneto	A dish made with pappardelle egg pasta (a large, flat egg pasta noodles, similar to wide fettuccine or Tagliatelle), with a sauce of peas, bacon and Parmigiano-Reggiano cheese
Passatelli in brodo		Emilia-Romagna	A dish of Passatelli pasta, made of breadcrumbs, eggs, Parmigiano-Reggiano cheese, a pinch of spices (nutmeg or lemon peel), cooked in a capon broth
Pasta al pesto di pistacchio		Sicily	A dish made with a short pasta, with a sauce of pistachio, cheese, lemon peel
Pasta alla gricia		Lazio	A Roman dish made with fried guanciale, Pecorino Romano cheese and black pepper (without tomatoes).
Pasta alla Norma		Sicily	A dish made with a short pasta, with a sauce prepared with tomatoes, fried eggplant, grated ricotta salata cheese, and basil
Pasta â Paolina		Sicily	A Palermo dish, made with a long pasta (usually bucatini or spaghetti), with tomato, anchovy, cinnamon, cloves, almonds, garlic, basil and breadcrumbs.
Pasta ca nunnata		Sicily	A Palermo pasta dish, made with a long pasta, with a sauce of gianchetti (the whitebait of Mediterranean sardines and anchovies) olive oil, garlic, parsley, black pepper, and white wine.
Pasta chi Vrocculi Arriminati		Sicily	A Palermo dish, made of a short pasta, with a sauce made of cauliflower, pine nuts, raisin, caciocavallo cheese, sardines and toasted breadcumbs
Pasta con ceci e 'nduja		Calabria	A dish of long pasta, with a sauce of chickpeas and 'Nduja
Pasta con le sarde		Sicily	A Palermo dish, made with a long pasta (usually bucatini or spaghetti), with a sauce with a finely chopped mixture of sardines and anchovy.
Pasta con i peperoni cruschi		Basilicata	A pasta dish, served with peperoni cruschi (crispy peppers), fried crumb and, optionally, grated pecorino or cacioricotta cheese
Pasta cu lu 'ndruppeche		Basilicata	A Potenza dish, made with pasta like ferretti, strascinati or orecchiette, with the 'Ndruppeche sauce (a typical ragù sauce, made with the salame pezzente), seasoned with chili or grated horseradish
Pasta e ceci		Campania	A chickpea and pastas soup with garlic and rosemary in Sammarinese cuisine
Pasta e fagioli		Campania	A beans and pastas soup, commonly prepared with cannellini beans or borlotti beans and some type of small pasta such as elbow macaroni or ditalini. Additional ingredients may be used, and many variants exist.
Pasta mollicata		Basilicata, Calabria and Sicily	A dish of pasta, with toasted bread crumbs (and, eventually, tomato). It is a traditional dish of the Basilicata cuisine, but widespread throughout southern Italy; the pasta ca muddica is a Sicilian variant
Pasta 'ncasciata		Sicily	A Messina dish of baked pasta, made of maccheroni pasta with a tomato sauce, with minced meat, boiled eggs, eggplant, caciocavallo cheese, pecorino cheese and garlic
Pastasciutta antifascista			A pasta dish seasoned with butter and parmesan to celebrate the fall of fascism in 1943.
Penne all'arrabbiata		Lazio	A Roman dish of penne pasta, with the arrabbiata sauce, a spicy sauce made from garlic, tomato, and red chili peppers cooked in olive oil ("arrabbiata" literally means "angry" in Italian; the name of the sauce refers to the spiciness of the chilli peppers)
Penne alla norcina		Umbria	A dish of penne pasta, with a sauce of milk cream and sausage, flavored with fresh truffles, and Parmigiano-Reggiano cheese
Pici all'aglione		Tuscany	A Siena dish of pici pasta (a hand-rolled pasta, like fat spaghetti), with a tomato sauce rich of garlic
Pisarei e faśö		Emilia-Romagna	A Piacenza dish of small soft dough gnocchi dumplings, made of flour and breadcrumbs, with a tomato sauce with beans, bacon and onion
Pizzoccheri della Valtellina		Lombardy	A Valtellina dish of pizzoccheri, with a sauce of cooked along with greens (often Swiss Chard but also Savoy cabbage), and cubed potatoes, layered with pieces of Valtellina Casera cheese, and dressed with garlic lightly fried in butter.
Ravioli di borragine		Liguria	A Genoa dish made with Ravioli dumplings, filled with ricotta cheese and Borage, served with butter and walnuts
Ravioli di radicchio rosso		Veneto	A Venetian dish made with ravioli dumplings, filled with a dough made of ricotta cheese and Radicchio Rosso di Treviso, and served with butter and Parmigiano-Reggiano cheese
Ravioli di patate		Lazio	A Roman dish made with ravioli dumplings, filled with a dough made of boiled potatoes, sausage, Grana Padano cheese, mint, and served with butter and Parmigiano-Reggiano cheese
Ravioli scarpolesi		Molise	A Molise pasta dish made with ravioli dumplings, filled with boiled potatoes, boiled chard, ricotta cheese, bacon, eggs, fennel, and served with a ragù sauce
Ravioli capresi		Campania	A Capri dish of round ravioli dumplings, filled with caciotta cheese, eggs, Parmigiano-Reggiano cheese and marjoram, served with a fresh tomato sauce
Rigatoni alla silana		Calabria	A dish of Rigatoni pasta, with a tomato sauce with dried sausage, bacon, pecorino cheese
Rigatoni con la Pajata		Lazio	A Roman dish of rigatoni pasta, with the typical pajata tomato sauce. Pajata is the term for the intestines of an "un-weaned" calf. The intestines are cleaned and skinned, but the chyme is left inside. Then the intestine is cut in pieces which are bound together with white thread, forming rings. When cooked, the combination of heat and the enzyme rennet in the intestines coagulates the chyme and creates a sort of thick, creamy, cheese-like sauce. These rings can be served simply seasoned and grilled (pajata arrosto) or in the traditional Roman dish in which pajata is stewed in a typical tomato sauce and served with rigatoni
Sagne a lu cuttéure		Abruzzo	A dish of Castiglione Messer Marino, mostly prepared in carnival time, made with handmade sagne pasta, with a tomato sauce with sausage, bacon and sweet chili powder
Sagne 'ncannulate		Apulia	A Salento dish of sagne pasta, with a tomato sauce with ricotta cheese
Scarpinocc		Lombardy	A Bergamo dish of a variant of ravioli dumplings, filled with breadcrumbs, cheese, eggs, butter and raisin, with a sauce of cheese and melted butter, flavored with sage leaves
Scialatielli ai frutti di mare		Campania	A dish from the Amalfi coast, made of scialatielli pasta (a type of thick and short fettuccine or linguine-like pasta featuring a rectangular cross-section), with a seafood sauce, existing in two variants: red (with tomato in the sauce, usually fresh cherry tomatoes) and white (without tomato). The sauce is made with shellfish (clams and mussels) and crustaceans (shrimp and prawn). This dish is a variant of the spaghetti allo scoglio
Scrippelle 'mbrusse		Abruzzo	A Teramo dish made of scrippelle, a pasta similar to a thin pancake, made from wheat flour and eggs, served in chicken broth
Spaghetti aglio, olio e peperoncino		Lazio	A Roman dish of spaghetti pasta made by lightly sauteeing minced or pressed garlic in olive oil, sometimes with the addition of dried red chili flakes. Finely chopped parsley can also be added as a garnish
Spaghetti all'assassina		Apulia	A Barese spaghetti dish in which the pasta is cooked directly on the pan with a tomato sauce broth (in the style of risotto until the spaghetti is browned and nearly burned.
Spaghetti alla carbonara/carbonara		Lazio	A Roman dish of spaghetti pasta, with raw eggs, Pecorino Romano cheese, bacon (guanciale or pancetta), and black pepper
Spaghetti alla carrettiera		Sicily	A dish of spaghetti pasta, with olive oil, raw garlic, chili pepper, parsley, and pecorino siciliano or breadcrumbs, and commonly tomato.
Spaghetti alla chitarra con ricotta, salsiccia e zafferano		Abruzzo	A dish of spaghetti alla chitarra, a long egg pasta with a square cross-section (about 2–3 mm thick), whose name comes from the tool (the so-called chitarra, literally "guitar") this pasta is produced with, a tool which gives spaghetti its name, shape and a porous texture that allows pasta sauce to adhere well. The chitarra is a frame with a series of parallel wires crossing it. This dish is prepared with a tomato sauce with sausage, ricotta cheese made from ewe's milk and saffron
Spaghetti alla chitarra con sugo di agnello		Abruzzo	A dish of spaghetti alla chitarra, a long egg pasta with a square cross-section (about 2–3 mm thick), whose name comes from the tool (the so-called chitarra, literally "guitar") this pasta is produced with, a tool which gives spaghetti its name, shape and a porous texture that allows pasta sauce to adhere well. The chitarra is a frame with a series of parallel wires crossing it. This dish is prepared with a tomato sauce with lamb meat
Spaghetti alla cipolla		Calabria	
Spaghetti alla Nerano		Campania	A dish from the Sorrento peninsula, made with spaghetti pasta, fried zucchinis, and provolone del Monaco
Spaghetti alla puttanesca		Campania	A Naples dish, made with spaghetti pasta, with a tomato sauce, with anchovies, olives, capers and garlic
Spaghetti allo scarpariello		Campania	Made with spaghetti pasta, tomatoes, Pecorino Romano cheese, Parmigiano Reggiano cheese, basil, chili pepper, extra virgin olive oil, garlic and salt
Spaghetti alla vesuviana		Campania	A Naples dish, made with spaghetti pasta, with a tomato sauce, with olives, capers, garlic, oregano, chili, chopped parsley and Parmigiano Reggiano cheese
Spaghetti alle vongole		Campania	Spaghetti with clams. Prepared in two ways: in bianco, i.e., with oil, garlic, parsley, and sometimes a splash of white wine; and in rosso, like the former but with tomatoes and fresh basil
Spaghetti allo scoglio		Campania	The spaghetti allo scoglio ("reef spaghetti") is dish of spaghetti pasta with seafood, existing in two variants: red (with tomato in the sauce, usually fresh cherry tomatoes) and white (without tomato). The sauce is made with shellfish (clams and mussels) and crustaceans (shrimp and prawn). This dish has many variants, named spaghetti ai frutti di mare, spaghetti alla pescatora, spaghetti alla marinara, with small changes in the selection of the seafood
Spaghetti all’ubriaco (Spaghetti ubriachi)		Tuscany	"Drunken spaghetti": spaghetti cooked in red wine sauce. Exists in various forms across Italy, particularly associated with Tuscany and especially Florence.. In Tuscany generally, "pappardelle alla chiantigiana" (Chiantian pappardelle), made with Chianti wine, is popular; other names include "strisce alla chiantigiana" (Chiantian stripes). Compare the name with Thai drunken noodles.
Spaghetti con puntarelle, acciughe e briciole		Lazio	A dish of Spaghetti pasta, with a sauce made of puntarelle (a variant of chicory), anchovy, breadcrumbs and garlic
Spätzle		Trentino-Alto Adige/Südtirol	Spätzle dumplings served with milk cream and butter
Stringozzi ai funghi e tartufi		Umbria	A dish of strangozzi long pasta with a rectangular cross-section, with a sauce of truffles and mushrooms
Stroncatura		Calabria	A dish of struncatura pasta (similar to linguine with buckwheat flour which gives it a brown color), with a sauce of anchovies, breadcrumbs, garlic, oil and hot pepper
Strozzapreti alla pastora		Emilia-Romagna	A dish made with strozzapreti pasta (literally "priest-choker" or "priest-strangler"), with a tomato sauce with ham sausages, milk cream, saffron and Parmigiano-Reggiano cheese
Tagliatelle al papavero		Friuli-Venezia Giulia	A dish of tagliatelle egg pasta (long, flat ribbons that are similar in shape to fettuccine and are typically about 6.5 mm to 10 mm wide), served with a creamy sauce made with poppy seeds and onion fried in oil
Tagliatelle al ragù		Emilia-Romagna	A classical Bolognese dish, made with tagliatelle egg pasta (long, flat ribbons that are similar in shape to fettuccine and are typically about 6.5 mm to 10 mm wide), with the traditional Bolognese sauce made of tomato and minced beef (NB: Although very popular abroad, a dish named spaghetti alla bolognese does not exist in the Italian tradition, the Bolognese sauce is only used with tagliatelle or some other kind of egg pasta).
Tagliolini al tartufo		Piedmont	A dish of tagliolini egg pasta (a type of ribbon egg pasta, similar to tagliatelle but thinner, in Piedmontese called tajarin, served with butter and truffles
Testaroli con pesto (or testaroli al pesto)		Liguria	A dish of testaroli egg pasta (a type of pasta is prepared using water, flour and salt, which is sliced into triangular shapes, called testaieu in Ligurian, served with pesto sauce
Timballo		Campania	A baked pasta dish, made with cheese, meat and vegetables.
Tordelli lucchesi		Tuscany	A Lucca dish of tordelli dumplings (a variant of tortelli, with a semi-circular shape and containing a filling of meat thymus and herbs), served with a ragù sauce
Tortel Dols di Colorno		Emilia-Romagna	A Parma dish of tortelli dumplings (tortel in Parmigiano) with sweet filling. They are stuffed with breadcrumbs, cooked wine and mustard. Once boiled, they are served with melted butter flavored with Parmigiano Reggiano cheese
Tortelli amari di Castel Goffredo		Lombardy	A Castel Goffredo dish, made with a type of tortelli dumplings (the tortello amaro di Castel Goffredo), with a filling of balsamita aromatic herbs, bread crumbs, eggs, nutmeg, sage, onion, Parmigiano-Reggiano cheese, garlic and salt and served with melted butter flavored with sage and sprinkled with Parmigiano-Reggiano cheese
Tortelli cremaschi		Lombardy	A Crema dish of tortelli dumplings (Lombard of Crema: turtèi cremasch) with sweet filling and the shape of a half-moon. The filling in made of amaretto biscuits minced, breadcrumbs, candied cedro, nutmeg, a typical spicy biscuit of Crema called mostaccino, egg yolks, Grana Padano cheese, grated lemon peel, marsala, mint candies, raisin. Once boiled, they are served with melted butter flavored with Grana Padano cheese
Tortelli della Possenta		Lombardy	A Mantua dish of tortelli dumplings with sweet filling and red color. The dough of the puff pastry is made with flour eggs, beetroot, olive oil and salt and the filling is made of cherries, ricotta cheese, red wine, mustard, Parmigiano-Reggiano cheese, sugar, breadcrumbs, cinnamon, nutmeg, butter. Once boiled they are served with melted butter flavored with Parmigiano Reggiano cheese
Tortelli di patate		Tuscany	A Mugello region and Casentino dish of tortelli dumplings of squared shape and bigger than the usual tortelli, with a filling made of boiled potatoes, Parmigiano-Reggiano cheese, nutmeg and salt, and served with a tomato sauce based on meat of beef or duck of wild boar
Tortelli di zucca		Lombardy	A Mantua dish of tortelli dumplings with pumpkin in the filling. The dough of the puff pastry is made with flour and eggs and they are stuffed with boiled pumpkin, amaretto biscuits minced, mustard, nutmeg and Parmigiano Reggiano cheese. Once boiled they are served with melted butter flavored with Parmigiano Reggiano cheese
Tortelli maremmani con spinaci		Tuscany	A Maremma dish of tortelli dumplings with a squared shape and stuffed with spinach. The dough of the puff pastry is made with flour and eggs and they are stuffed with ricotta cheese, boiled spinach, nutmeg and grated pecorino cheese. Once boiled they are served with a ragù sauce based on meat of Maremma's beef or wild boar
Tortelli verdi		Emilia-Romagna	A Parma and Reggio Emilia dish of tortelli verdi (green tortelli dumplings), with a filling made of chard, spinach, ricotta cheese, Parmigiano Reggiano cheese, bacon, onion and garlic. Once boiled they are served with melted butter flavored with Parmigiano Reggiano cheese
Tortellini di Valeggio sul Mincio		Veneto	Traditional tortellini di Valeggio sul Mincio dumplings, served in broth
Tortellini in brodo		Emilia-Romagna	A Bolognese dish made with the traditional tortellini dumplings, cooked in broth
Tortelloni burro e salvia		Emilia-Romagna	A Bolognese dish made with tortelloni dumplings
Trenette al pesto		Liguria	A Genoa pasta dish, made with trenette pasta (a dried pasta similar to flat spaghetti), with pesto sauce
Troccoli al ragù di seppia		Apulia	A Daunians pasta dish, made with troccoli pasta (a local variant of spaghetti alla chitarra), with a ragù sauce based on cuttlefish
Troccoli con pomodori secchi, acciughe e mollica		Apulia	A Daunians pasta dish, made with troccoli pasta (a local variant of spaghetti alla chitarra), with a sauce based on dried tomatoes, anchovies and breadcrumbs
Trofie al pesto		Liguria	Traditional Genoa pasta dish, made with trofie pasta, with pesto sauce
Trofie di Portofino		Liguria	A pasta dish, made with Trofie pasta, with a mix of pesto sauce and tomato sauce
Tumact me tulez		Basilicata	A pasta dish of Arbëreshë origin, made with tagliatelle pasta, with tomato, anchovies, fried crumb and chopped walnuts
Turtèl sguasaròt		Lombardy	A Mantua dish made with turtèl sguasaròt dumplings, filled with beans and chestnuts and served in a sauce made of cooked wine, bread crumbs, lemon and cloves
Vincisgrassi		Marche	A baked pasta dish, similar to lasagne al forno (considered the marchigian variant). It is prepared made with vincisgrassi pasta, with ragù sauce, béchamel sauce and cheese
Ziti al forno		Campania	A baked pasta dish made with ziti pasta, eggplant, meat sauce and cheese

== Other countries ==
Title	Image	Origin	Description
Alphabet soup		United States	Prepared using alphabet pasta. In the U.S., it is commercially produced in a can of condensed broth.
Älplermagronen		Switzerland	Dish of pasta and potatoes enriched with cream and cheese, and seasoned with onions. Usually accompanied with apple compote.
American chop suey		United States	Consists of elbow macaroni and bits of cooked ground beef with sautéed onions and green peppers in a thick tomato-based sauce.
American goulash		United States	Baked as a casserole in an oven, and has many variants, it has been mentioned in U.S. cookbooks since at least 1914. Core ingredients now usually include various kinds of pasta, cubed steak, and tomatoes in some form, (e.g. canned, sauce, soup, paste). Diced chuck roast, ground beef or hamburger is often substituted for cube steak.
Ankake Spaghetti		Japan	A pasta dish from Nagoya.
Baked ziti		United States	A baked casserole dish made with ziti macaroni and sauce characteristic of Italian-American cuisine. This plate has similar properties to a Lasagna, but using ziti pasta instead.
Barbecue spaghetti		United States	A dish developed in Memphis, Tennessee, that tops spaghetti noodles with pulled or smoked pork in a barbecue sauce-based marinara.
Bryndzové halušky		Slovakia	It is one of the national dishes in Slovakia. This meal consists of halušky (boiled lumps of potato dough similar in appearance to small gnocchi) and bryndza (a soft sheep cheese), usually sprinkled with cooked bits of smoked pork fat/bacon.
Canned pasta		Italian–American	Various shapes of pasta, such as SpaghettiOs or ravioli, canned with tomato sauce.
Cevizli erişte		Turkey	A walnut pasta from Anatolia.
Chicharon macaroni		Northern Philippines	Chicharon macaroni is a popular crunchy snack in the Philippines, notably produced in Calasiao, Pangasinan. The process involves boiling elbow macaroni until soft, sun-drying it for three days, and then deep-frying it in hot oil. This traditional business, passed down through generations, is often sold by the scoop in local markets..
Chicken noodle soup		Northern Europe	The primary ingredients are chicken and noodles in a chicken broth, possibly with pieces of vegetables (carrots, celery, peas, etc.).
Chicken riggies		New York, United States	A pasta-based dish typically consisting of chicken, rigatoni, and hot or sweet peppers in a spicy cream and tomato sauce.
Cincinnati chili		Cincinnati, United States	Spaghetti topped with a Greek-inspired meat sauce and grated cheddar, plus optionally onions and kidney beans.
Fideos al horno		Gibraltar	A baked pasta dish in Gibraltarian cuisine very similar to Maltese imqarrun which consists of macaroni, Bolognese sauce, and various other ingredients, including egg and bacon that vary according to family tradition
Fideuà		Gandia, Valencia, Spain	Originating in the 1920s in the city of Gandia, it is usually made with white-fleshed fish and crustaceans, and optionally served with allioli sauce. Many variants exist.
Filipino spaghetti		Philippines	Filipino adaptation of spaghetti in Bolognese sauce. Characteristically sweet due to the addition of banana ketchup or brown sugar to the sauce.
Frogeye salad		United States	A type of pasta salad made with acini di pepe pasta, whipped topping and egg yolks
Fun shaped pasta		United States	Pasta noodles extruded in fun shapes such as hearts, stars, or dinosaurs.
Giouvetsi		Greece	A baked or stewed meat dish made with either chicken, lamb or beef, orzo or sometimes egg noodles and tomato sauce
Johnny Marzetti		Columbus, Ohio, United States	A baked pasta dish or casserole, consisting of noodles, tomato sauce, cheese and ground beef, with additional shredded cheese typically added to the top before baking.
Koshary		Egypt	A traditional Egyptian staple, mixing pasta, Egyptian fried rice, vermicelli and brown lentils, and topped with a zesty tomato sauce, garlic vinegar and garnished with chickpeas and crispy fried onions.
Kugel		Central Europe	A baked pudding or casserole, similar to a pie, most commonly made from egg noodles (Lokshen kugel) or potato. It is a traditional Ashkenazi Jewish dish, often served on Shabbat and Yom Tov.
Kusksu		Malta	A soup in Maltese cuisine prepared with vegetables and small pasta beads called kusksu, along with fresh broad beans when in season.
Lazanki (skryliai)		Polish–Lithuanian Commonwealth	A Belarusian, Lithuanian and Polish pasta dish
Linsen mit Spätzle		Swabia, Germany	A traditional Swabian dish of Lentils with Swabian pasta that is normally accompanied with wiener sausages
Macaroni and cheese		England	Consists of cooked macaroni pasta and cheese, most commonly Cheddar cheese, though it can also incorporate other ingredients, such as bread crumbs and ham.
Macaroni casserole		Northern Europe, Malta, and Indonesia	A staple in northern European home cooking. It is a dish of cooked macaroni and a mixture of egg and milk with additional ingredients like meats, vegetables or fish.
Macaroni pie		Scotland	In Scotland, a macaroni pie is an open pie containing macaroni and cheese. It is also a part of other cuisines.
Macaroni salad		Unknown	A type of pasta salad, served cold, made with elbow macaroni and usually prepared with mayonnaise. It is often served as a side dish.
Makarnalı köftender		Turkey	Makarnalı köftender (İskender tarzı köfteli makarna) (İskender style meatball pasta) consists of köfte topped with hot tomato sauce of pasta and generously slathered with melted sheep's milk butter and yogurt. Tomato sauce and melted butter are generally poured over the dish, at the table.
Makaron z truskawkami		Poland	Strawberry and cream sauce over cooked pasta.
Makarony po-flotski		Russia	Literally "navy-style pasta", a Russian dish made of cooked pasta (typically macaroni, penne or fusilli) mixed with stuffing made of ground meat (usually beef or pork) and fried onions and seasoned with salt and black pepper.
Maklor		Indonesia	Short for "makaroni telor" means macaroni and egg, an Indonesian snack made of stir-fried boiled macaroni and egg sprinkled with salty or spicy powdered seasoning.
Maultasche		Swabia (in Baden-Württemberg), Germany	A traditional German dish that consists of an outer layer of pasta dough which encloses a filling traditionally consisting of minced meat, smoked meat, spinach, bread crumbs and onions and flavoured with various herbs and spices (e.g. pepper, parsley and nutmeg).
Naporitan		Yokohama, Japan	Spaghetti, tomato ketchup or a tomato-based sauce, onion, button mushrooms, green peppers, sausage, bacon and Tabasco sauce. An instant Naporitan is also available in Japan today.
Naryn		Uzbekistan	Made with fresh hand-rolled noodles and horse meat. Naryn can be served as a cold pasta dish (kuruk norin – dry norin) or as a hot noodle soup (khul norin – wet norin).
Pasta primavera		Canada	Consists of pasta and fresh vegetables. A meat such as chicken is sometimes added, but the focus of primavera is the vegetables themselves.
Pastitsio		Greek	A Greek and Mediterranean baked pasta dish including ground beef and béchamel sauce in its best-known form
Penne alla vodka		Italian-American	Prepared with vodka and penne pasta and often includes heavy cream, crushed tomatoes, onions, and sometimes sausage or bacon
Pizza-ghetti		Canada	A combination meal commonly found in fast food or family restaurants throughout the province of Quebec and other parts of Canada. It is prepared with a pizza, sliced in half, accompanied by a small portion of spaghetti with a tomato-based sauce.
Rechta		Algeria	A dish made of fresh artisanal pasta cut into thin strips.
Rosto		Gibraltar	A dish in Gibraltarian cuisine that is of Italian origin, consisting of penne in a tomato sauce with beef or occasionally pork, mushrooms and carrots (among other vegetables depending on family tradition) and topped with grated "queso bola"
Sabounee		Italian	A kind of ring-shaped pasta that is typically stuffed with a mix of meat (pork loin, prosciutto)
Sopas		Philippines	Filipino comfort food that is creamy, macaroni soup made with elbow macaroni, chicken, vegetables, and evaporated milk. Unlike Italian-style pasta dishes, sopas is served as a warm soup with a rich, milky broth.
Spaghetti sandwich		Japan, United States	Prepared with cooked spaghetti, sauce and bread
Spaghetti with meatballs		United States	An Italian-American dish that usually consists of spaghetti, tomato sauce and meatballs
Tallarines verdes		Peru	A Peruvian pasta dish consisting of spaghetti tossed with a pesto sauce made of spinach, basil, shallot, queso fresco, and walnuts.
Tarako Spaghetti		Japan	A Japanese-style pasta dish featuring cooked spaghetti tossed with salted pollock roe (tarako), butter and nori, resulting in a rich, umami, and briny flavor.
Tetrazzini		United States	Prepared with diced poultry or seafood, and mushrooms, in a butter/cream and Parmesan sauce flavored with wine or sherry, and served hot over linguine, spaghetti, or some similarly thin pasta, garnished with parsley, and sometimes topped with almonds and Parmesan cheese.
Toasted ravioli		St. Louis, Missouri	Breaded deep-fried ravioli, sometimes served as an appetizer. Pictured is toasted ravioli with a dipping sauce.
Túrós csusza		Hungary	A savoury curd cheese noodle dish or cottage cheese noodle dish made with small home-made noodles or pasta.
Keh-ao-tong (茄牛通)		Hong Kong	Also known as Beef and Tomato Macaroni Soup (番茄牛肉通心粉), this is a Chinese dish that combines macaroni with Chinese soup noodle cooking techniques. The soup is made with tomatoes and beef, and served with macaroni, a type of pasta, creating a sweet and sour flavor.
Macaroni Soup with Ham (火腿通粉)		Hong Kong	A quick and easy Chinese dish to prepare. Simply cook and drain the macaroni, then add shredded ham, broth (chicken broth), green peas, corn kernels, and other ingredients. It is relatively low in calories and nutritionally balanced.
Satay Beef Macaroni (沙爹牛肉通粉)		Hong Kong	A Chinese dish featuring a rich, sweet satay sauce paired with tender beef and macaroni.
Macaroni with Spiced Pork Cubes (五香肉丁通粉)		Hong Kong	This is a Chinese dish featuring spicy and flavorful Spiced Pork Cubes paired with light macaroni, and savory meat gravy infused into the broth.
Fried Chicken with Spaghetti (雞扒意粉)		Hong Kong	A Chinese dish consisting of large pieces of chicken cutlet fried until golden and crispy, paired with chewy Italian pasta, and drizzled with a rich Chinese sauce.
Tomato Beef Spaghetti (牛排燴意粉)		Hong Kong	A Chinese dish that combines pan-fried steak with Chinese tomato sauce, black pepper, or cream flavors.
Luncheon meat macaroni soup (午餐肉通粉)		Hong Kong	It's a Chinese fast food dish consisting of pan-fried luncheon meat paired with macaroni, usually served in chicken or tomato broth. It's simple to make: cook the macaroni, then add thickly sliced, golden-brown luncheon meat. Often eaten with a fried egg, it's a classic breakfast or light meal choice.

== See also ==
- List of pasta
- List of sauces – sauces are often used in the preparation of pasta dishes
- List of noodle dishes

== Bibliography ==
- Boni, Ada (1983). La Cucina Romana (in Italian). Roma: Newton Compton Editori (first edition: 1930).
