= Pasta allo scarpariello =

Italian pasta dish

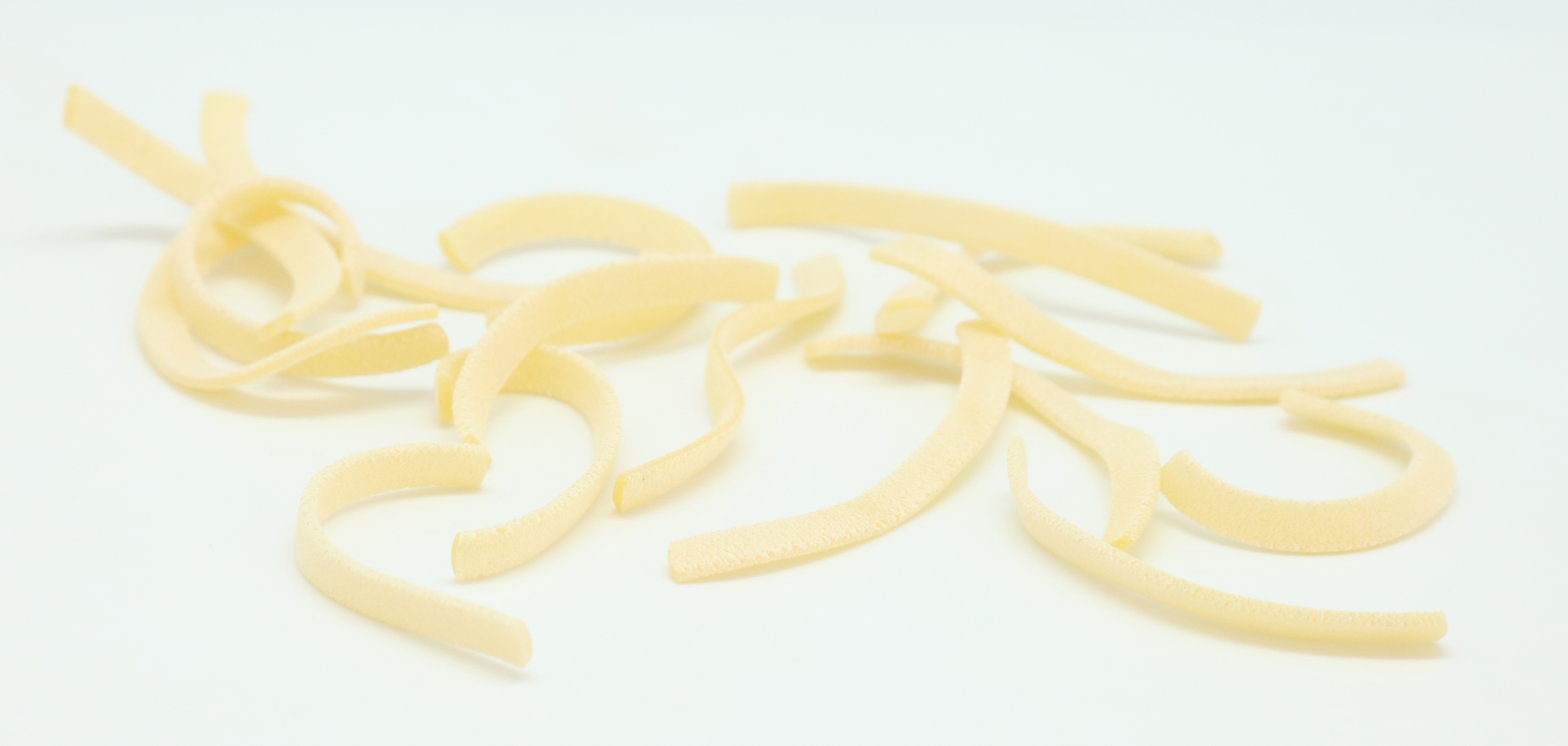
Scialatielli is used in Campania

Pasta allo scarpariello is a pasta dish from the city of Naples and the town of Aversa, Campania.

It is typically made with spaghetti, tomatoes, pecorino romano, Parmigiano Reggiano, basil, chili pepper, extra virgin olive oil, garlic, and salt. In Campania, it is also made with scialatielli pasta and yellow tomatoes.

Its name literally means "shoemaker's pasta", referencing an earlier time in the history of Naples of poverty when a shoemaker or cobbler might have been paid in-kind with a meal rather than money. The word for 'cobbler' is scarparo in Italian.

Pasta alla gricia, spaghetti alla puttanesca, carbonara and spaghetti alla carrettiera also fit the occupational theme naming convention.

== See also ==
- List of pasta
- List of pasta dishes
