= Spaghetti alla siracusana =

Sicilian toasted spaghetti dish containing anchovies

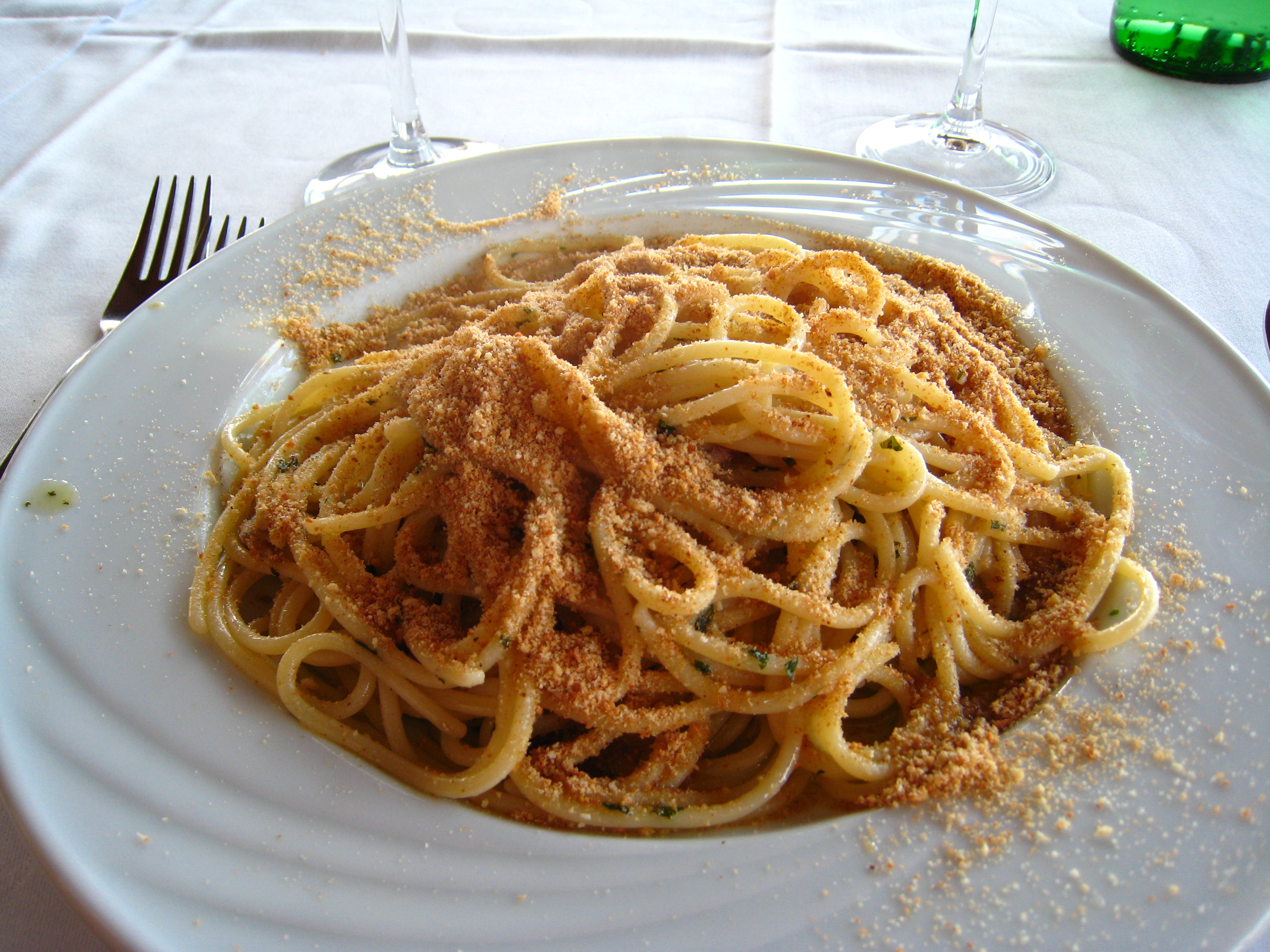
- Course: Primo (Italian course)
- Place of origin: Italy
- Region or state: Syracuse, Sicily
- Main ingredients: Spaghetti, fish, breadcrumbs

Spaghetti alla siracusana, also known as pasta fritta alla siracusana, is a pasta dish typical of Syracuse cuisine, widespread throughout Sicily.

== Origins of the dish ==
This typical Syracuse dish has very ancient roots. The recipe, which has now become part of the culinary tradition of the geographical area, initially presented itself in a very different way: the name of pasta alla siracusana (which preceded that of today's spaghetti) was used to indicate a type of processing of durum wheat decidedly thinner, known as capelli d'angelo, characterized by a very fine thickness.

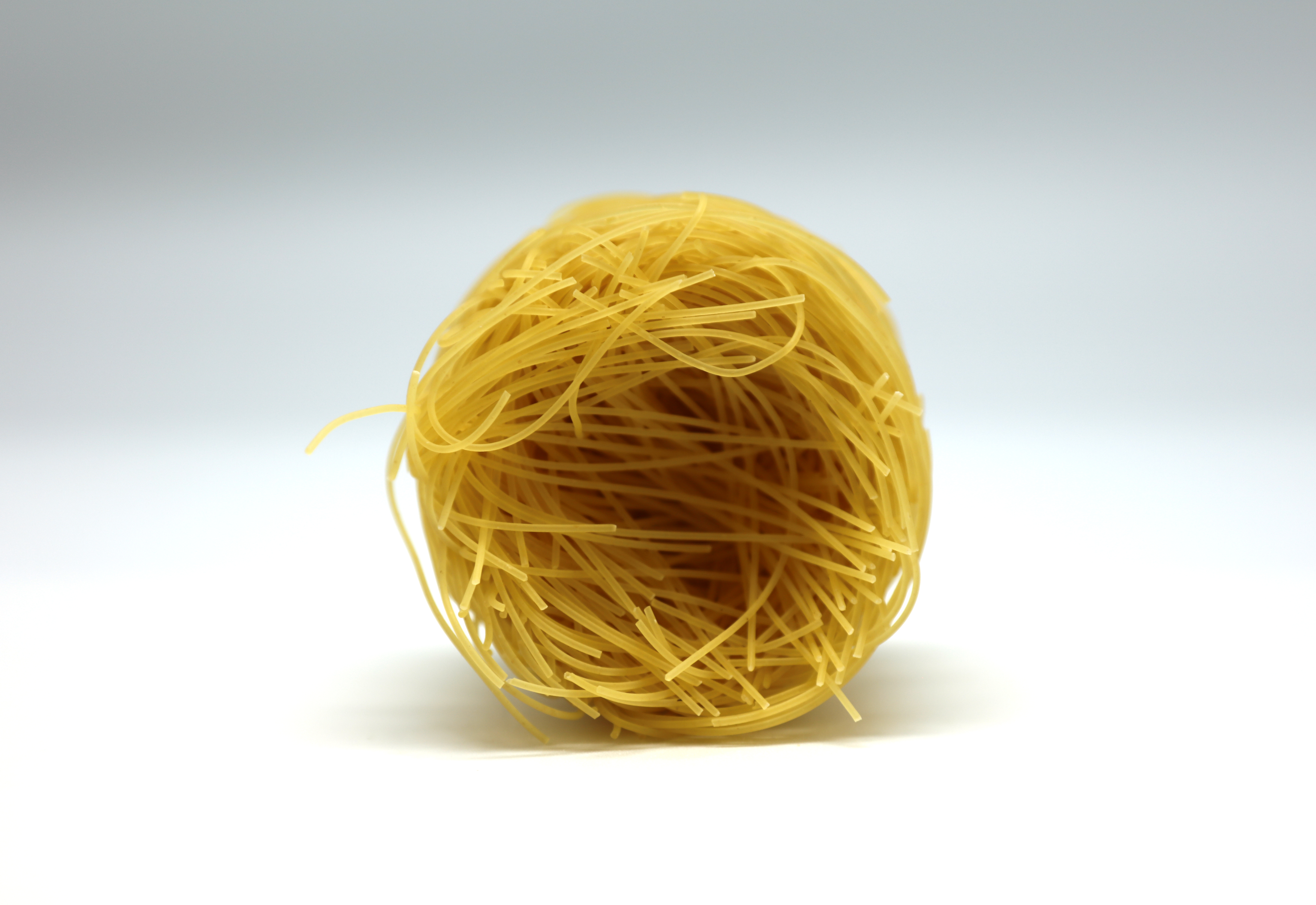
Capelli d'angelo, front

It is believed that capelli d'angelo was already being prepared in Syracuse at the time of Dionysius I (in what was the Greek colony of Ankón it continues to be prepared today and its inhabitants define this type of dish as a legacy of the ancient Syracusans). Only later would the Arab conquerors have taken inspiration from it to give life to the first European pasta trade, which historically started right from Sicily. In Syracuse, especially in the past, capelli d'angelo were rolled up and fried in lard and then sprinkled with "hot black honey from the Iblei mountains".

It is said that when the Sicilian nobleman Don Francesco Bonanno, also a war advisor to King Victor Amadeus II of Savoy and Emperor Charles VI of Habsburg, had to make a difficult decision, he sat at a table and always ordered a dish of pasta fritta alla siracusana from his monsù (or monzù), because he considered it stimulating for the brain and therefore a source of excellent political advice.

At a certain point, the ancient recipe was mixed with that of the dish that today is known as spaghetti alla siracusana, so the very fine pasta was replaced by thicker spaghetti; the use of honey has almost completely disappeared and fish and dry breadcrumbs are added instead. But initially, it was only the simply honeyed capelli d'angelo that fed the Syracusans, giving them a nutritious dish.

== Variants ==
This dish lends itself to many variations and is sometimes confused with Syracuse sauce (because of the presence of anchovies), the original recipe of which, however, often uses short pasta and does not involve the use of breadcrumbs, but rather a generous amount of vegetables, capers and olives; these are foods that are not present in the traditional recipe of this dish, with the rare exception of olives, which are black.

It should also not be confused with the first course, especially in Palermo, called pasta with sardines: although tradition says it was born in the Syracuse area (but by cooks of the Arab army, camped there to conquer the city), it is quite distant from the culinary customs of the Syracuse area, considering ingredients such as raisins and pine nuts (a classic combination of Palermo cuisine), as well as saffron, and the fish that dominates the dish is sardine, not anchovy. The toasted breadcrumbs in the original pasta with sardines are not present.

=== Fried version ===
One of the most well-known variants of the Syracuse dish involves frying the spaghetti: either they are cooked fresh separately and then fried in a pan—before being mixed with the anchovies—or leftover pasta is taken from the fridge and given new consistency this way.

Spaghetti alla siracusana in some recipes is also presented with tomato, both in its fried version and in the normal one. It is not uncommon to also find chili pepper (depending on the chosen variant), but always accompanied by the basic ingredients of the dish which remain anchovies and toasted breadcrumbs.

== See also ==
- Sicilian cuisine
- List of pasta
- List of pasta dishes
