= Trapanese =

Trapanese is an Italian surname, meaning literally "Trapanese", "from the city of Trapani or "from the province of Trapani". Notable people with the surname include:

- Joseph Trapanese (born 1984), American composer
- Rita Trapanese (1951–2000), Italian figure skater

== See also ==
- Pesto alla trapanese, a pasta sauce
