= Mucca Osteria =

Italian restaurant in Portland, Oregon, U.S.

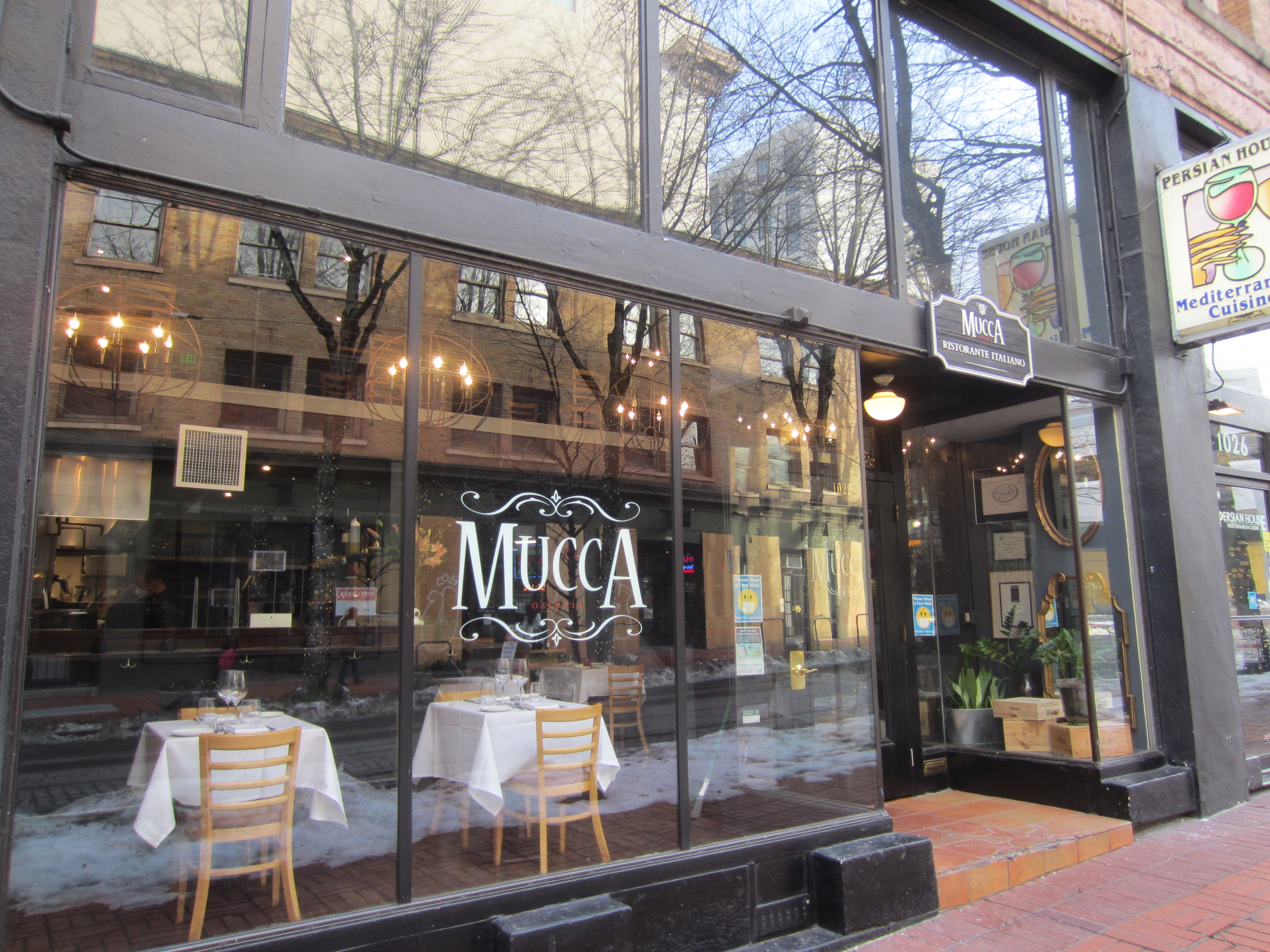
- The restaurant's exterior in 2021
- Interactive map of Mucca Osteria

Restaurant information
- Established: 2011
- Owner: Simone Savaiano
- Food type: Italian
- Location: 1022 Southwest Morrison Street, Portland, Oregon, 97205, United States
- Coordinates: 45.5201°N 122.6827°W
- Website: muccaosteria.com

Mucca Osteria is an Italian restaurant in Portland, Oregon, United States.

== Description ==
Mucca Osteria is an Italian restaurant in downtown Portland. Fodor's describes the restaurant as a "narrow, bi-level space with exposed-brick walls, rustic chandeliers, and tall windows overlooking a busy downtown space". The Oregonian's Michael Russell said "the decor leans suburban, its brick walls hung with ornate mirrors and a sepia-tinted map of Italy; the mezzanine overlooking chandeliers like large metal atoms".

The menu includes Dungeness crab salad with endive, arugula, apple, and champagne vinaigrette, handmade pastas such as maltagliati with rabbit, olives, and pine nuts, and slow-roasted pork shoulder with wild mushrooms and polenta. Rabbit gnocchi, risotto, and prosciutto-wrapped burrata are also on the menu. Antipasto include lamb carpaccio, seared scallops with Parmesan fondue.

== History ==
Chef and owner Simone Savaiano opened the restaurant in 2011. He opened Mucca Pizzeria next to the restaurant in 2023.

== Reception ==
In 2014, AP Kryza of Willamette Week said Savaiano "is turning out some of the city's best Northern Italian eats" and wrote, "Mucca excels not because of innovation, but because of a loving commitment to comfort food taken to the next level, making it one of the most overlooked restaurants in a city obsessed with hyping the next big thing." Janelle Lassalle included the restaurant in Thrillist's 2016 list of Portland's best Italian restaurants. Michael Russell ranked Mucca Osteria number six in The Oregonian's 2016 list of Portland's ten best Italian restaurants, and included the business in a 2017 overview of the city's best pasta.

In 2018, Wine Spectator included Mucca Osteria in a 2018 list of 12 "prime" wine restaurants in the Pacific Northwest. The restaurant also received the magazine's Best of Award of Excellence in 2019. Brooke Jackson-Glidden included Mucca Osteria in Eater Portland's 2021 list of 15 "date-worthy" restaurants in Portland, and a 2022 overview of "The 38 Essential Restaurants and Food Carts in Portland". The business was also included in Eater Portland's 2022 overview of "Where to Eat and Drink in Downtown Portland" and 2025 list of the city's best Italian restaurants.

== See also ==
- List of Italian restaurants
- List of restaurants in Portland, Oregon
