= Pasta â Paolina =

Sicilian food

Pasta â Paolina is a pasta dish originating in the city of Palermo, Sicily. It was invented by a friar at the Monastery of San Francesco di Paola. Friars avoid meat consumption due to their traditional vow of poverty, so this dish is pescatarian and utilizes minimal ingredients. Traditionally it used bucatini, but now spaghetti is often used. It is made with anchovies, garlic, a small amount of chopped tomato, cinnamon, cloves, almonds, basil, and breadcrumbs.

== See also ==
- Sicilian cuisine
- List of pasta
- List of pasta dishes
