= Stroncatura =

Typical pasta dish of Calabrian cuisine

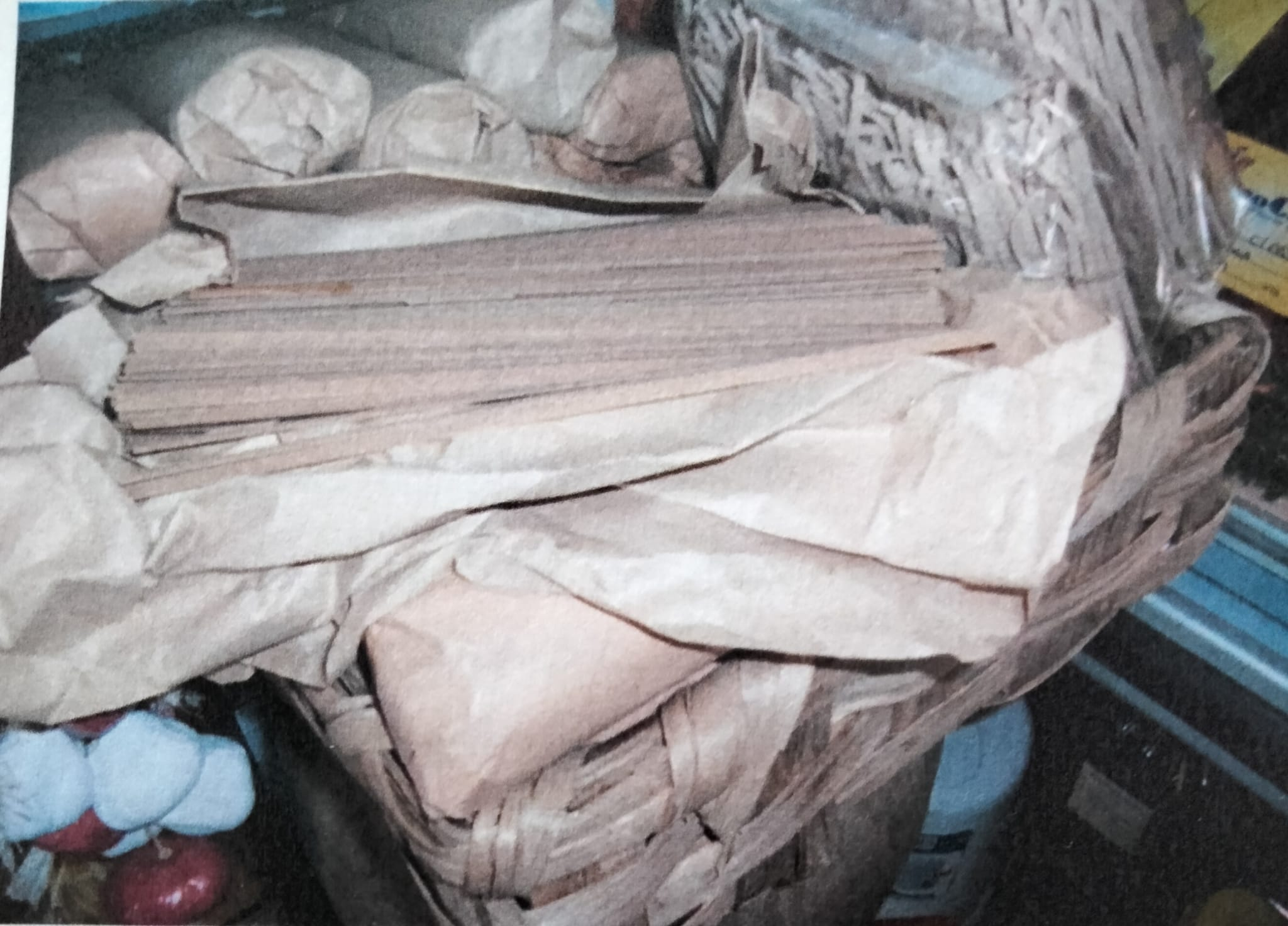
Stroncatura

Stroncatura (or struncatura in the Calabrian dialect) is a typical pasta dish of the cuisine of Calabria, particularly the comune (municipality) of Gioia Tauro. Although currently widespread throughout Calabria, the area of greatest sale and consumption is to be considered the Tyrrhenian belt of the province of Reggio Calabria. The main component of the dish is a pasta resembling linguine made with the residues of flour and bran from the milling of wheat.

At one time, stroncatura was illegal to sell, because of its unhygienic origins from mill waste floor sweepings, and was only eaten by the poor. Its production is now hygienic, and it has become a mainstream dish.

== See also ==
- List of pasta
- List of pasta dishes
