= Fileja =

Type of pasta

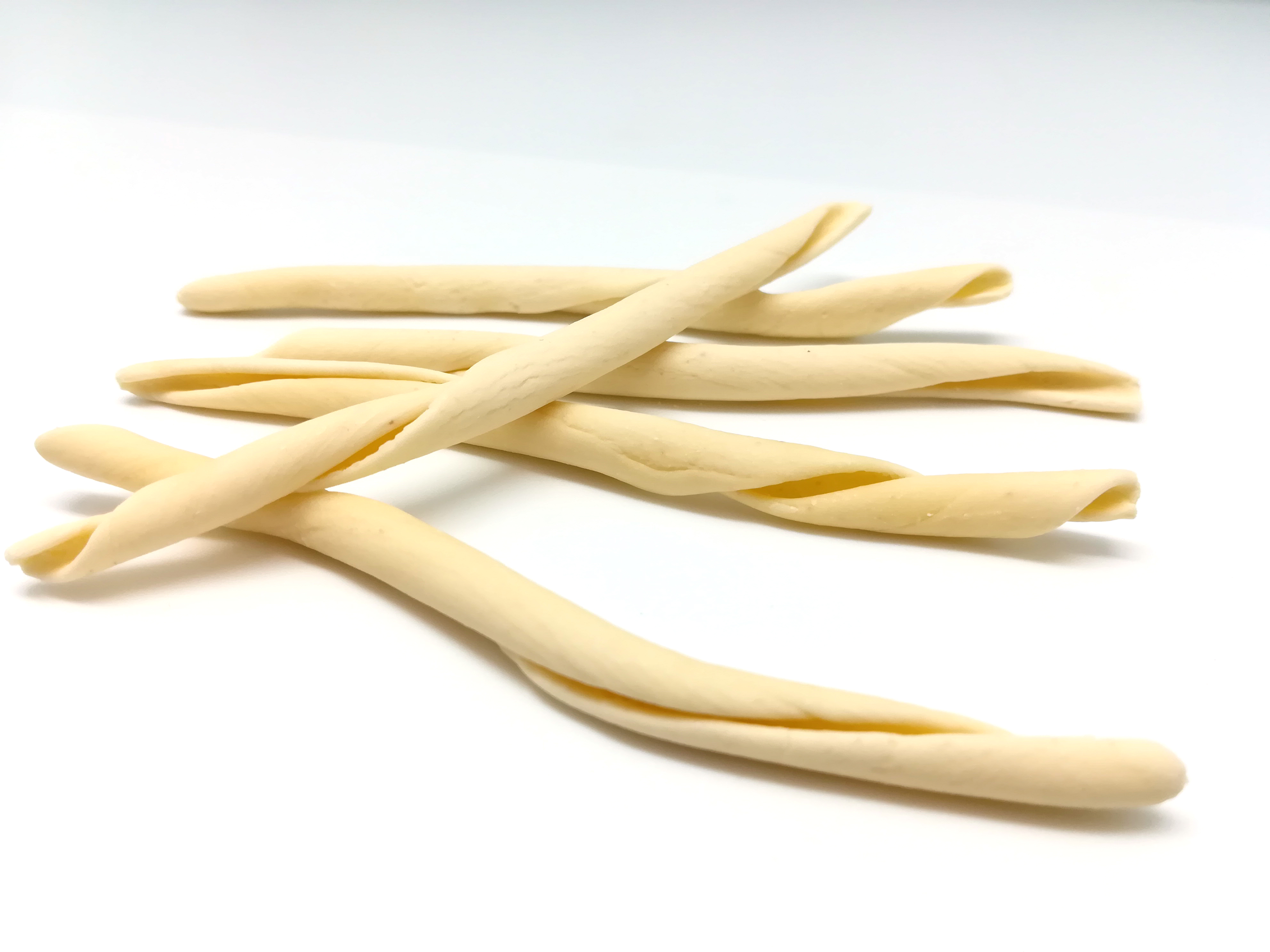
- Alternative names: filateddhi, filatelli, maccarruna i casa, maccaruni aru ferru
- Type: Pasta
- Place of origin: Italy
- Region or state: Vibo Valentia, Calabria
- Main ingredients: durum wheat semolina, water

Fileja (pronounced [fɪˈlɛːja]) is a type of pasta typical from the province of Vibo Valentia, Calabria. Made of durum wheat semolina and water, they are prepared by wrapping a sheet of pasta around a thin cane (dinaciulu), creating a hollow tube approximately 20 cm in length.

== See also ==
- Busiate
- Casarecce
