= Pisarei e faśö =

Italian pasta dish

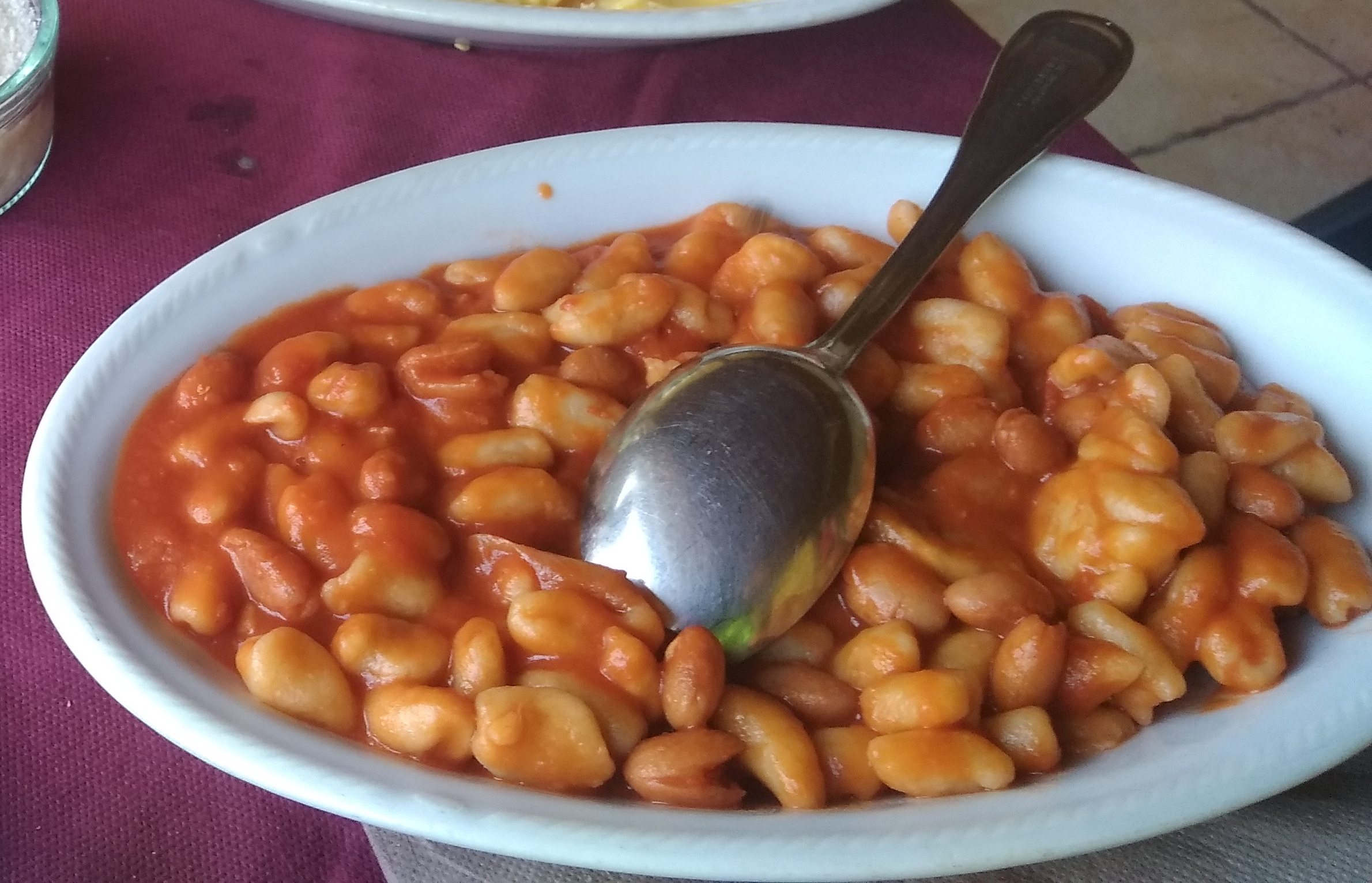
- Alternative names: Pisarei cui faśö
- Course: Primo (Italian course)
- Place of origin: Italy
- Region or state: Emilia-Romagna
- Main ingredients: Flour, breadcrumbs, beans

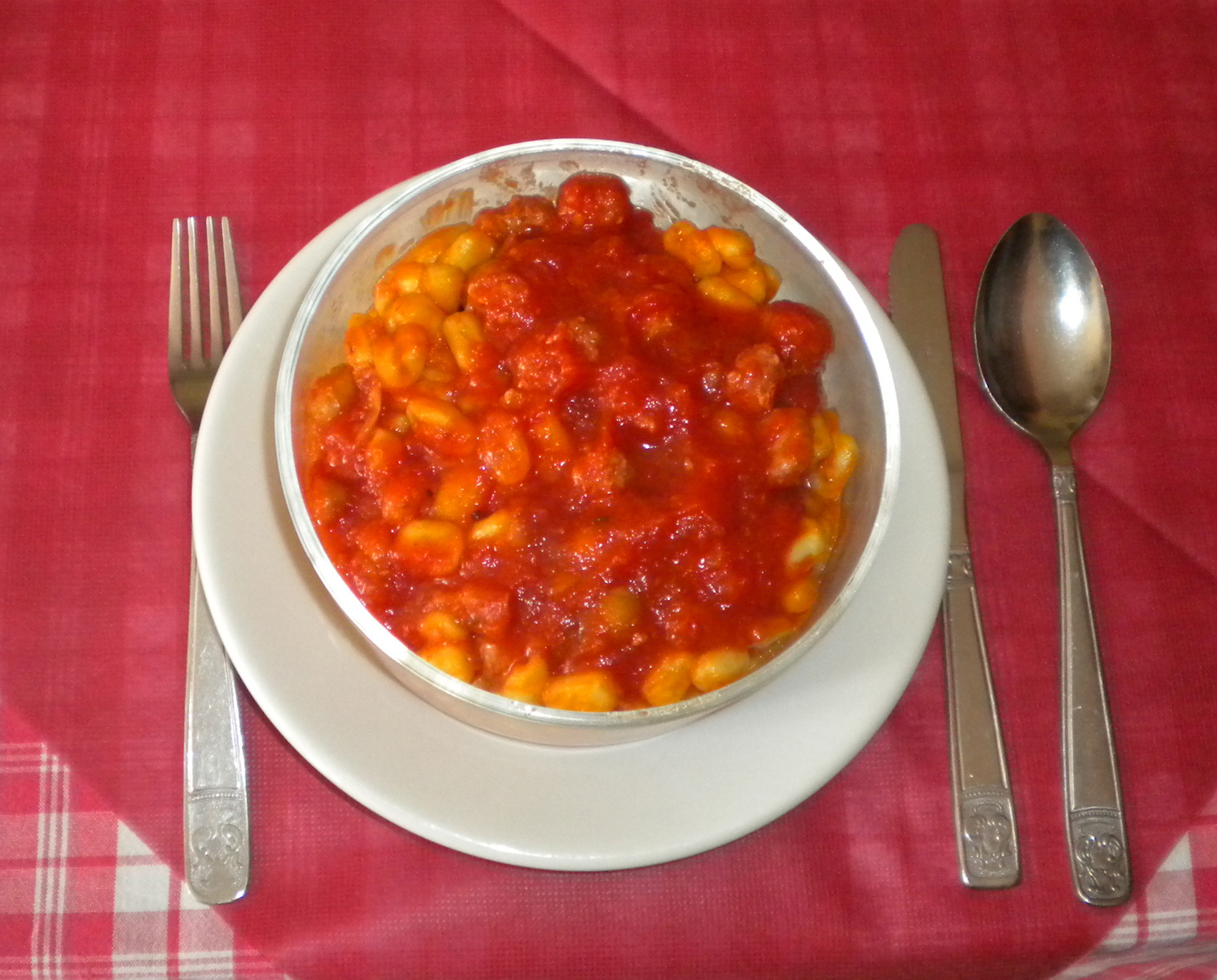
Pisarei e faśö

Pisarei e faśö (Emilian: [pisaˈʁeːi e faˈzøː, -ˈzoː]), also called pisarei cui faśö, is a typical pasta dish of the Italian province of Piacenza, among the best known of Piacenza cuisine. These are small gnocchi made of flour and breadcrumbs served with a sauce made of beans, lard, onion, and tomato. An ancient peasant recipe, poor but complete, still today it is very popular among the people and in the restaurants of Piacenza.

The dish has been enhanced and regulated with the denominazione comunale d'origine (De.CO) mark by the municipal administration of Piacenza.

== Etymology ==
It is presumed that the name of the pasta comes from its vague resemblance to a small penis, which in Piacenza's dialect is called pisarell. The term derives from the onomatopoeic verb pisä, meaning 'to urinate'.

== History ==
A reliable tradition tells that the recipe at the base of pisarei e faśö was developed in the Middle Ages inside the monasteries of Piacenza thanks to the monks, who served recipes of poor but nutritious ingredients to feed pilgrims going to Rome, in transit on the Via Francigena. At one time, borlotti beans were used instead of borlotti beans and the recipe did not include tomato puree, as borlotti beans and tomatoes were introduced in Europe only after the discovery of the Americas.

== See also ==
- List of pasta
- List of pasta dishes

== Bibliography ==
- Monica Cesari Sartoni (2005). Mangia italiano. Guida alle specialità regionali italiane (in Italian). Morellini Editore. p. 100. ISBN 88-89550-05-8.
