= Cjarsons =

Italian pasta dish

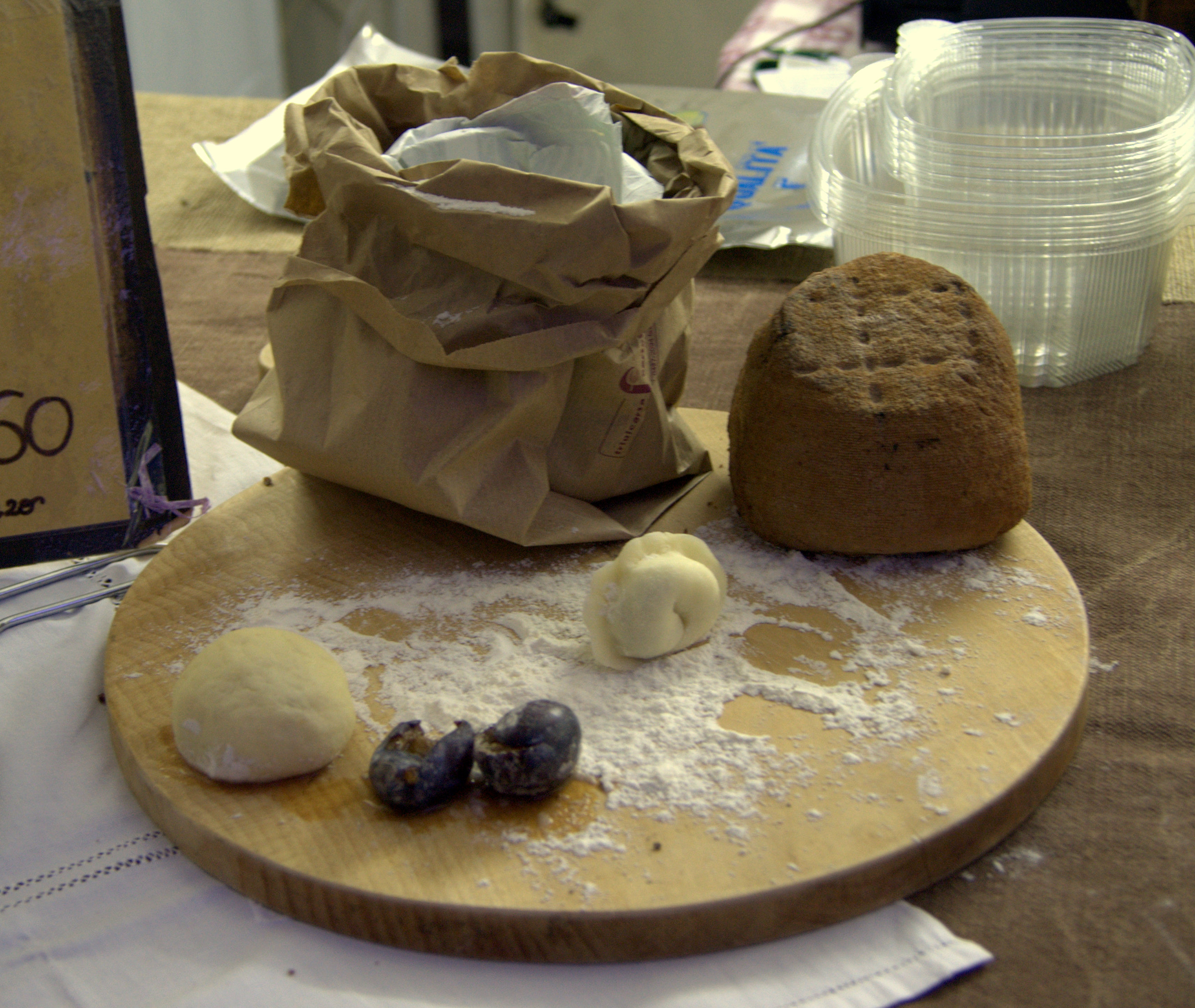
- Alternative names: Cjalsons, cjalzons
- Course: Primo (Italian course)
- Place of origin: Italy
- Region or state: Friuli-Venezia Giulia
- Main ingredients: Potato dough, ricotta, cinnamon, raisins

Cjarsons (locally [carˈsoŋs]), also known as cjalsons or cjalzons, is a typical dish of Friulan cuisine, more specifically of the alpine region of Carnia, but also common in the whole Friuli-Venezia Giulia region.

== Description ==
Cjarsons consist of a filled soft wheat or (in some variants) potato dough, similar to agnolotti or ravioli, and are characterized by a sweet-savoury contrast. The filling (pistùm or pastùm) is prepared differently depending on the local recipe; it may contain raisins, dark chocolate or cocoa, cinnamon, spinach, chives, ricotta, marmelade, rum, grappa, parsley, biscuits, eggs or milk.

Similarly to ravioli, they are cooked in salted water and, after they are drained, they are seasoned with melted butter and smoked ricotta cheese (scuete fumade). As a substitute for butter, the ont (foamed butter, drained from water and thickened for the sake of preservation) may be used.

Cjarsons have been a traditional dish for important celebrations (such as weddings), but they were rediscovered and promoted in the 1970s by Carnic chef Gianni Cosetti.

== See also ==
- List of pasta
- List of pasta dishes
