= Ditalini =

Type of pasta

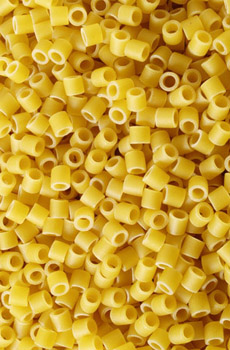
Ditalini

Ditalini (Italian: [ditaˈliːni]; English: "small thimbles"), also referred to as tubettini, is a type of pasta that is shaped like small tubes. It has been described as "thimble-sized" and as "very short macaroni". In some areas it is also called "salad macaroni". During the industrial age in Apulia, Italy, increased development of ditalini and other short-cut kinds of pasta occurred. In contemporary times, it is a mass-produced pasta. It is used in several dishes and is commonly used throughout Sicily.

== Use in dishes ==
Ditalini may be used in several pasta dishes, such as pasta e fagioli (pasta and beans). It is used in traditional Sicilian dishes throughout Sicily. Some Sicilian dishes with ditalini include pasta with ricotta cheese and pasta chi vrocculi arriminati, which is a pasta and broccoli dish. It has been described as used often in soups, and as an ideal pasta for use in soups due to their small size being able to "fit well on a spoon". It may also be used in pasta salads.

In Campania, they are often paired with creamy sauces, and with peas or beans, which become lodged in the pasta's centre.

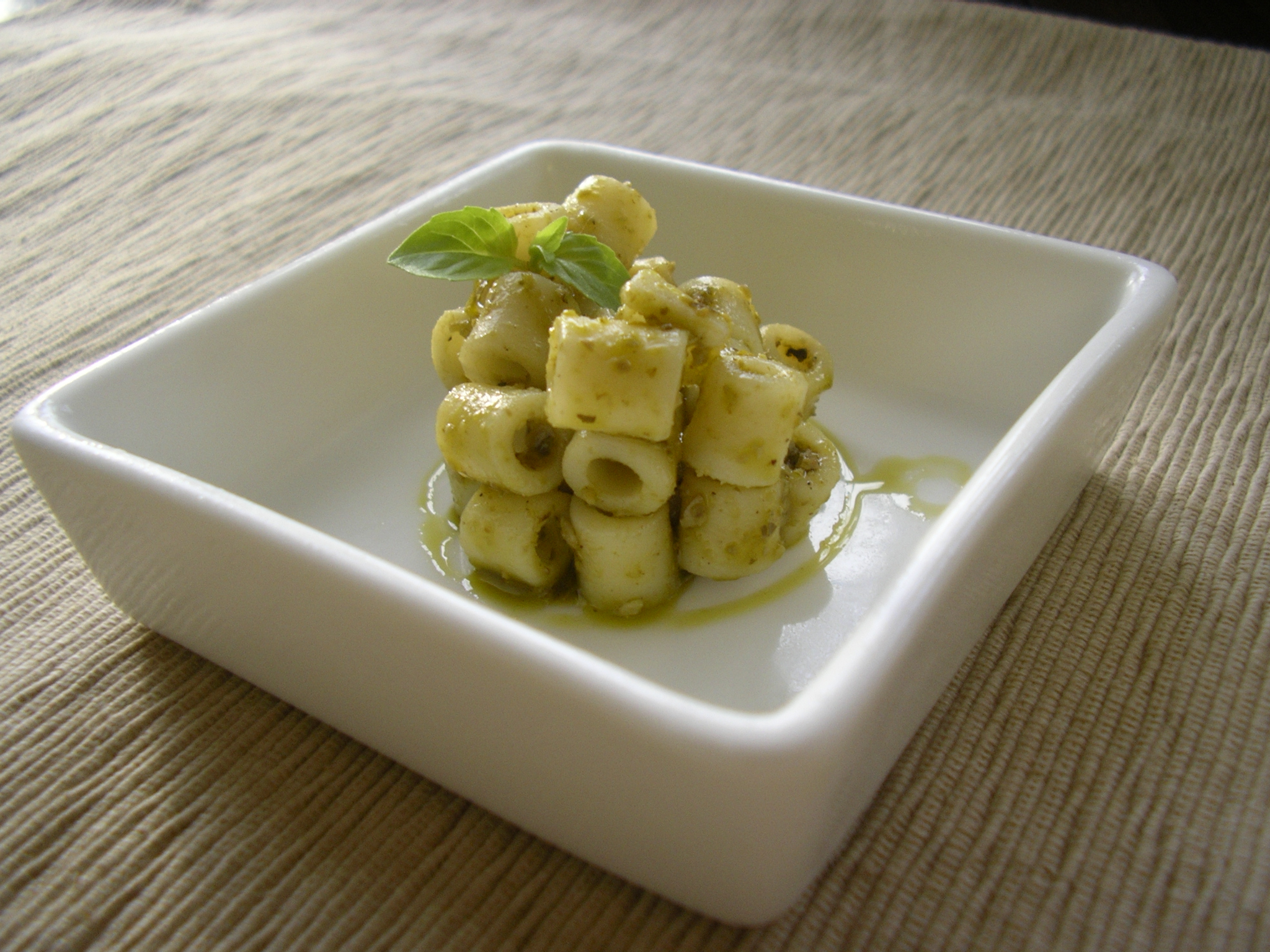
A small appetizer of ditalini with pesto

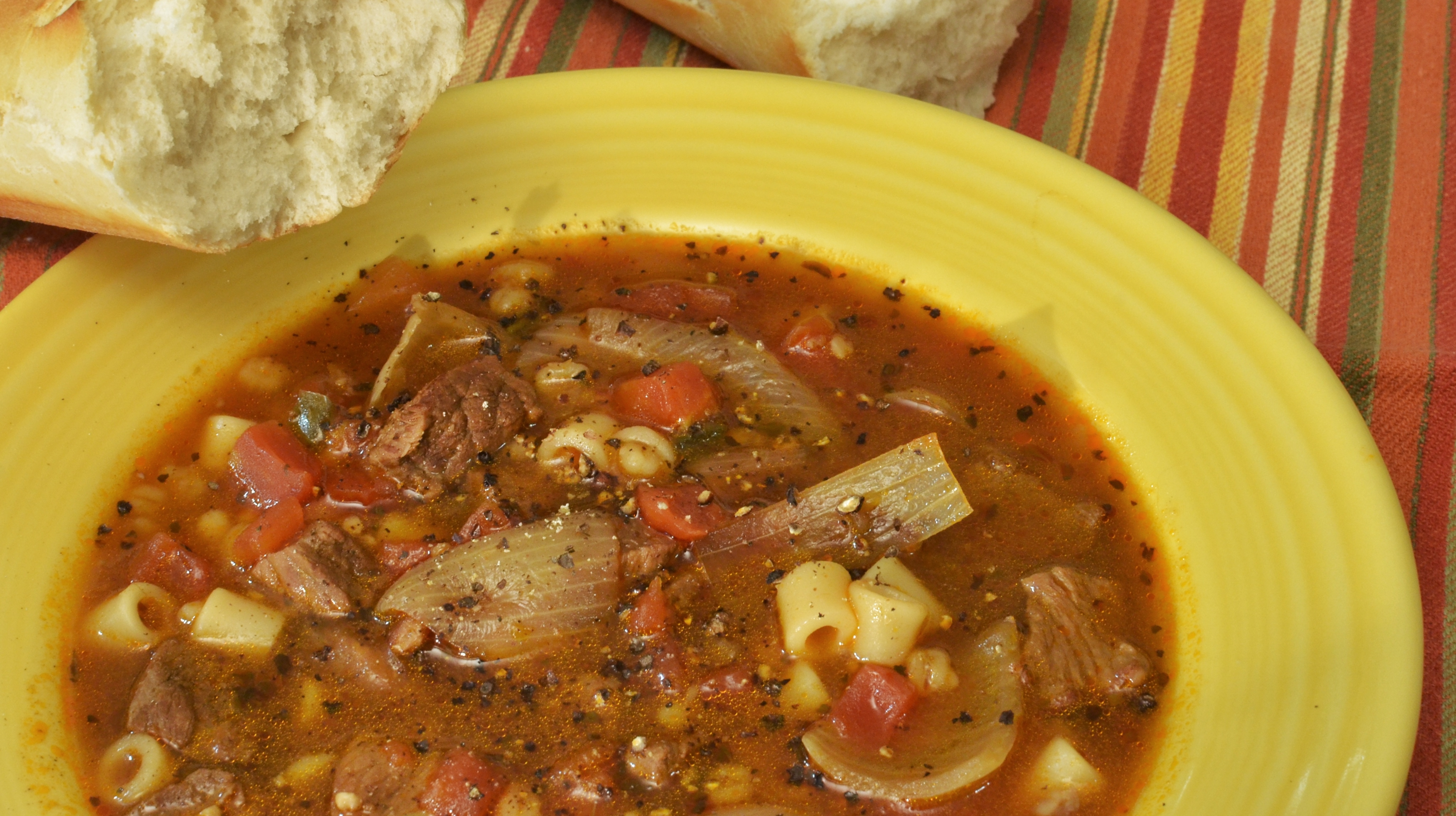
Beef and barley soup with tomatoes and ditalini

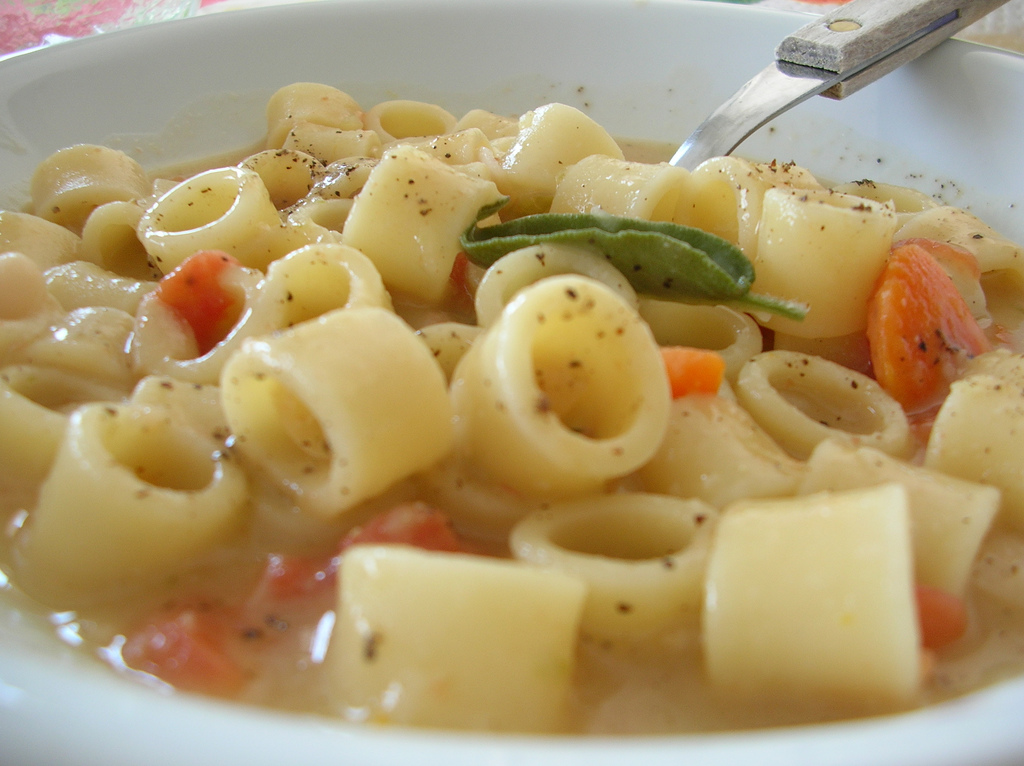
Pasta e fagioli prepared with ditalini

== See also ==
- List of pasta
