= Pasta ca nunnata =

Sicilian pasta dish

Pasta ca nunnata is a pasta dish originating in the Sicily region of Italy prepared with newborn fish, which may be anchovies, sardines, red mullet or bream, as well as spaghetti, olive oil, garlic, parsley, white wine and black pepper. Sardines are most common and preferred, especially in the Palermo area. Where bream is used, the most common species is common pandora, known as luvari, uvari or luari in Sicilian. Tomatoes are sometimes added, but this is less common. The dish is also sometimes referred to as pasta ca sfighiata.

== See also ==
- Sicilian cuisine
- List of pasta
- List of pasta dishes
