= Hirtenmakkaroni =

Pasta dish from South Tyrol

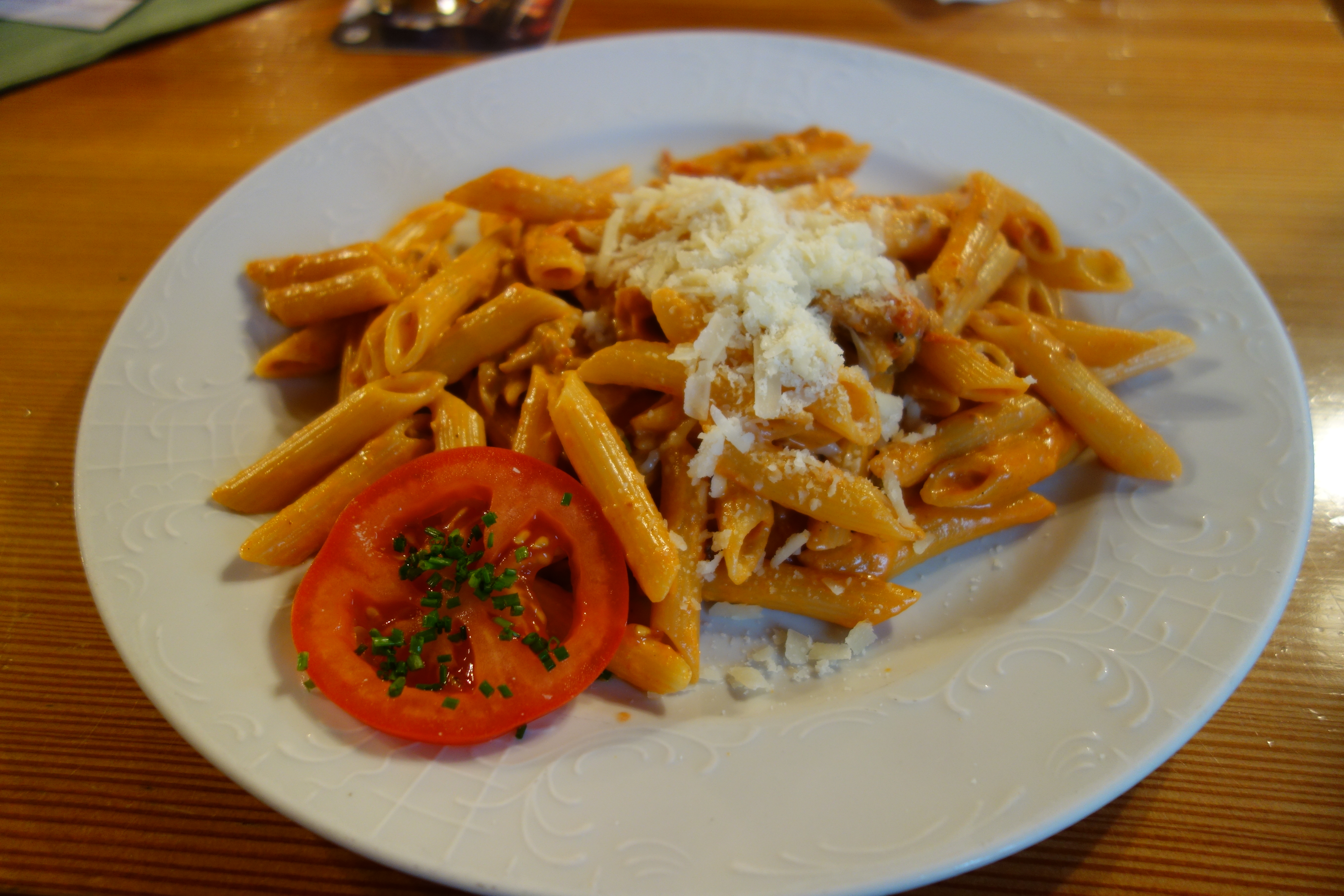
- Hirtenmakkaroni at Hochmuth
- Course: Primo (Italian course)
- Place of origin: Italy
- Region or state: South Tyrol (BZ); Trentino-Alto Adige/Südtirol

Hirtenmakkaroni (German for 'shepherd-style macaroni'), also known as Hirtnnudl in German and maccheroni alla pastora in Italian, is a pasta dish originating in the South Tyrol region, consisting of penne rigate, cream, peas, champignon mushrooms and cooked ham, topped with grated Parmesan cheese, typically served in mountain huts. There are several ways of preparing Hirtenmakkaroni, for example the ragù can be replaced with sausages.

== See also ==
- List of pasta
- List of pasta dishes

== Bibliography ==
- Italienische Klassiker von A-Z. Bielefeld: Dr. Oetker Verlag. 2019. ISBN 978-3-7670-1754-2.
