= Garganelli =

Type of tubular, egg-based pasta

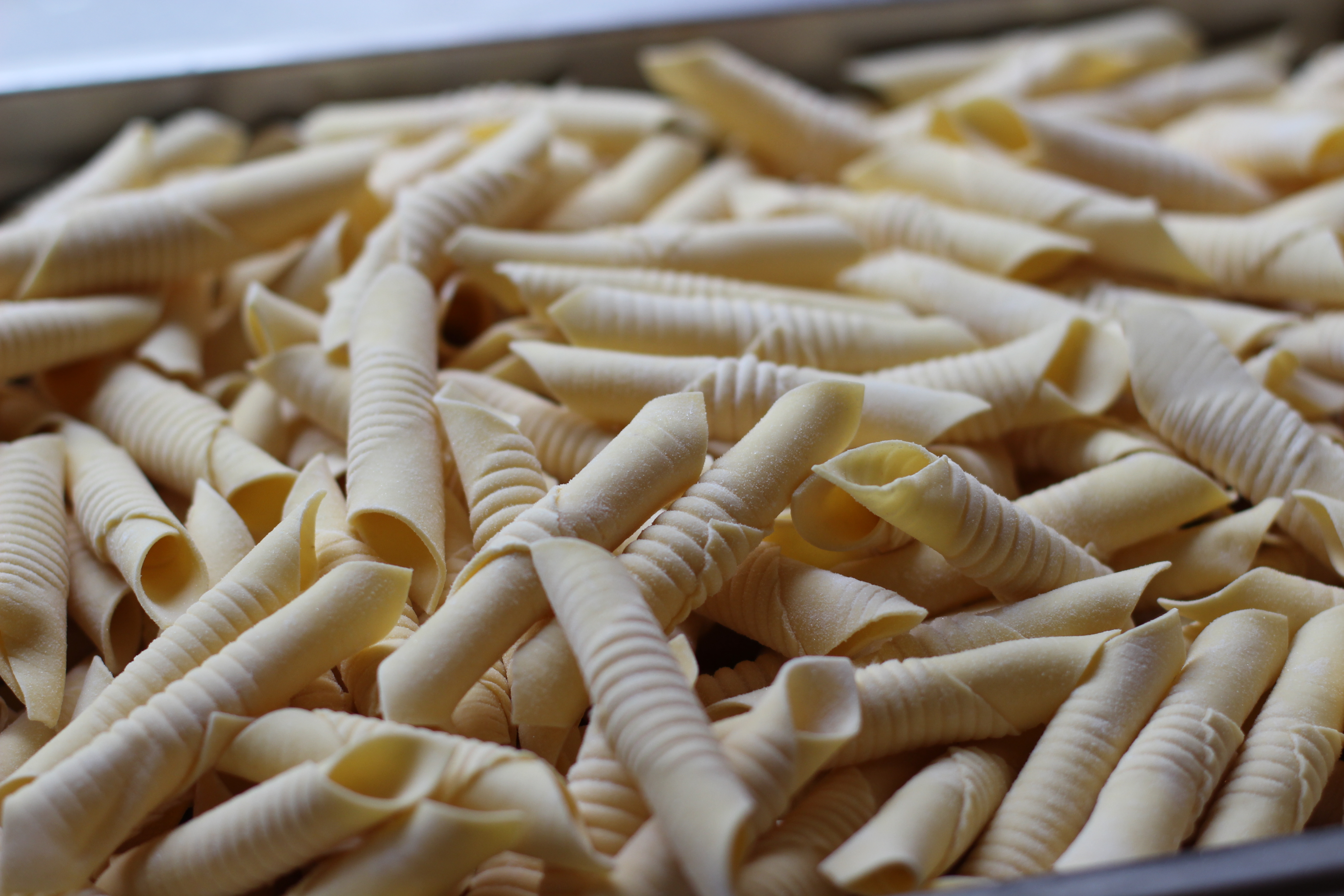
- Type: Pasta
- Place of origin: Italy
- Region or state: Emilia-Romagna
- Main ingredients: Flour, eggs

Garganelli (Italian: [ɡarɡaˈnɛlli]; Romagnol: garganéi) are a type of egg-based pasta from the Emilia-Romagna region of Italy. They are formed by rolling a flat, square noodle into a cylindrical shape over a ridged wooden board, giving the pasta ridges. Garganelli resemble ribbed quills with points at both ends.

== See also ==
- List of pasta
