= Pici =

Type of pasta

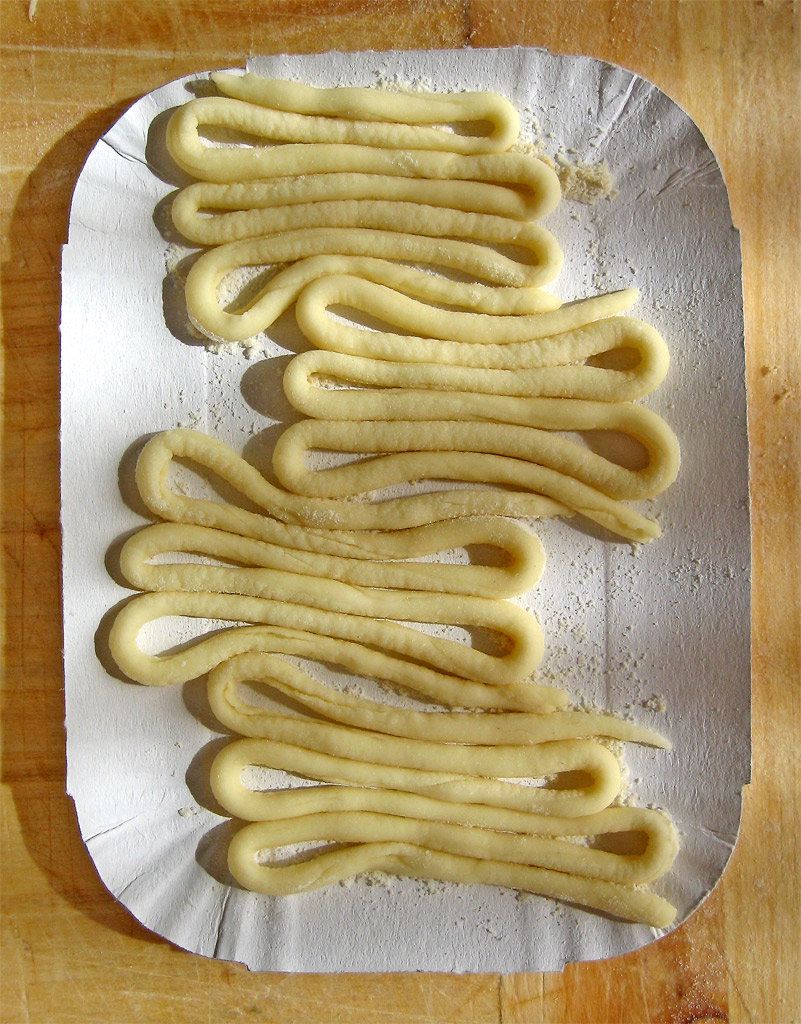
- Pici made with egg white
- Alternative names: Pinci
- Type: Pasta
- Place of origin: Italy
- Region or state: Province of Arezzo, province of Firenze, province of Grosseto, and province of Siena, Tuscany
- Main ingredients: Wheat flour, water

Pici (Italian: [ˈpiːtʃi], locally [ˈpiːʃi]) is thick, hand-rolled pasta, like fat spaghetti. It originates in the province of Siena, in Tuscany; in the Montalcino area it is also referred to as pinci (Italian: [ˈpintʃi]).

The dough is typically made from flour and water only. The addition of egg is optional, being determined by family traditions. Alternatively, finely chopped or shredded spinach can be used in place of water.

The dough is rolled out in a thick flat sheet, then cut into strips. In some families, the strip of dough is rolled between one palm and the table, while the other hand is wrapped with the rest of the strip. It can also be formed by rolling the strip between the palms. Either method forms a thick pasta, slightly thinner than a common pencil. Due to its handmade nature, this pasta is not uniform in size and has variations of thickness along its length.

It is eaten with a variety of sauces and meats, particularly:

Food category	Italian	English
sauces	briciole	breadcrumbs
sauces	aglione	spicy garlic tomato sauce
sauces	boscaiola	porcini mushrooms
sauces	cacio e pepe	cheese and black pepper
sauces	ragù	a meat-based sauce
game meat	cinghiale	wild boar
game meat	lepre	hare
game meat	anatra (nana)	duck

== See also ==
- List of pasta
