= Spaghetti alla carrettiera =

Sicilian pasta dish

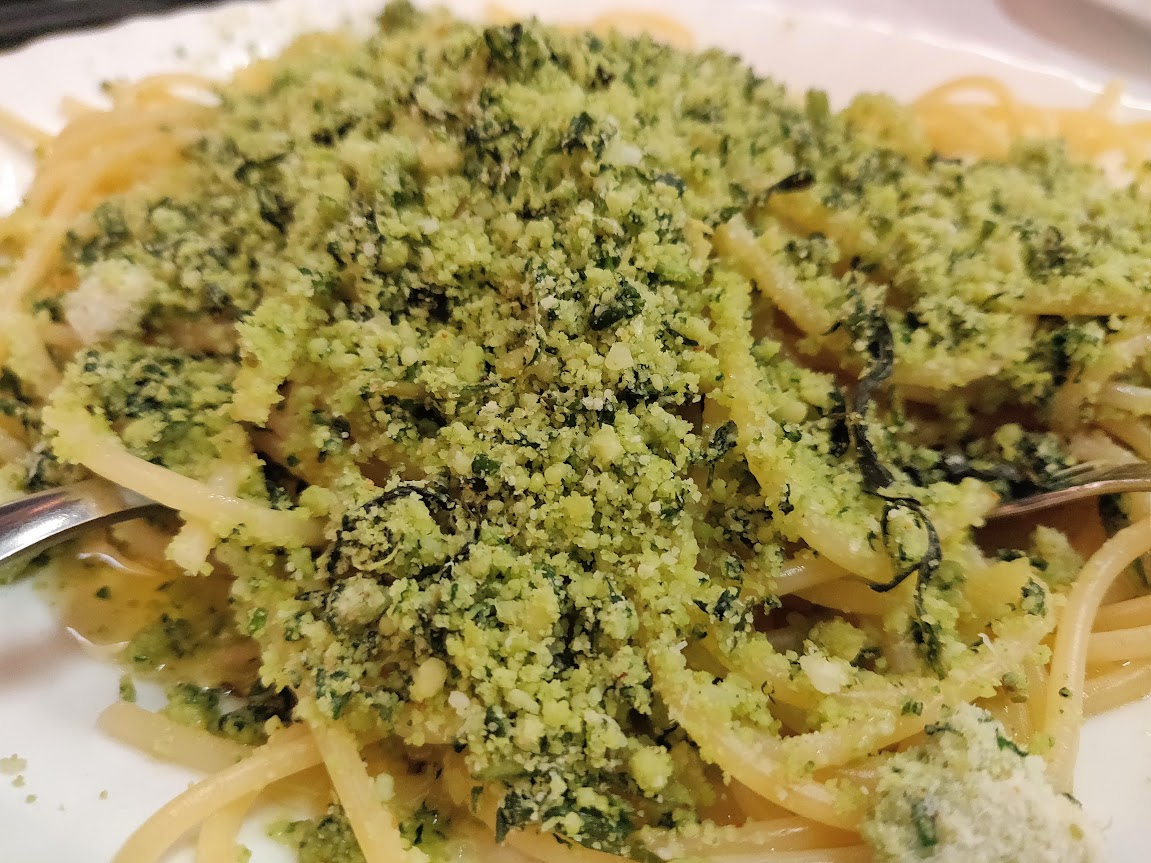
Spaghetti alla carrettiera

Spaghetti alla carrettiera is a pasta dish originating in the Platani Valley, nowadays more common in eastern Sicily. It is generally made with spaghetti, garlic, chili pepper, pecorino siciliano or breadcrumbs, parsley and olive oil for dressing, and commonly tomato is added. Sometimes additional ingredients such as anchovies, capers, almonds or pine nuts and white wine are also included. The oral tradition is that spaghetti alla carrettiera originated with carters who brought the dish prepared in advance, on their wagons for lunch.

== See also ==
- List of pasta
- List of pasta dishes
