= Pasta chi vrocculi arriminati =

Sicilian pasta dish

Pasta chi vrocculi arriminati is a pasta dish originating in the city of Palermo, Sicily. It generally consists of a long pasta such as spaghetti or bucatini, cauliflower, onion, raisins, anchovies, pine nuts, saffron, red chili, and breadcrumbs. Traditionally, it was made with bucatini. The name arriminati means 'mixed' and refers to the process of mixing until the cauliflower forms a creamy sauce.

== See also ==
- Sicilian cuisine
- List of pasta
- List of pasta dishes
