= Pesto alla trapanese =

Sicilian variety of pesto

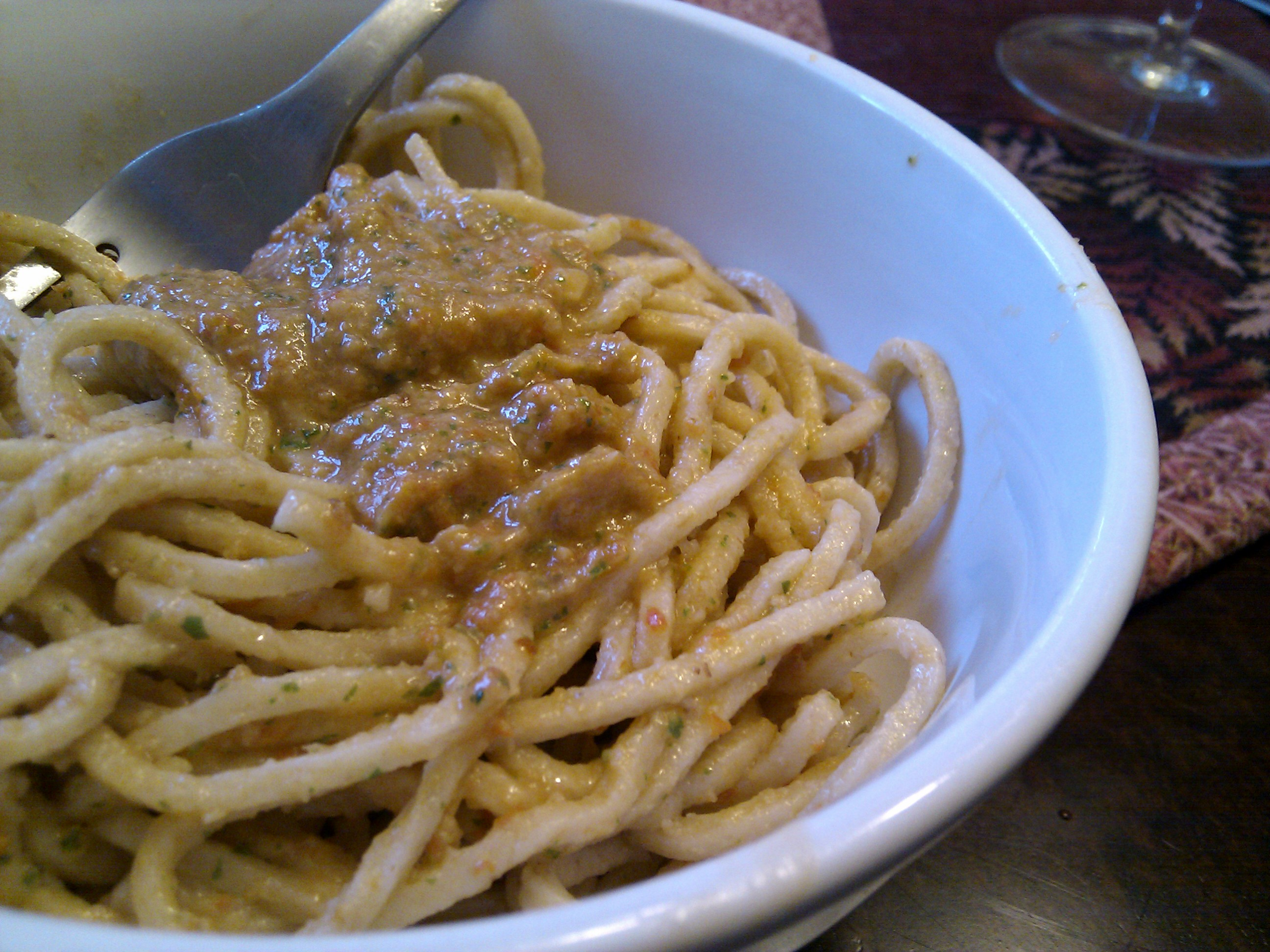
Pasta with pesto alla trapanese

Pesto alla trapanese (Italian: [ˈpesto alla trapaˈneːze]), also known as pesto alla siciliana (Italian: [ˈpesto alla sitʃiˈljaːna]) and as pasta cull'agghia in the Sicilian language, is the Sicilian variety of pesto, typical of the province of Trapani. It is made of garlic, basil, almonds, grated pecorino siciliano, tomatoes, salt, and black pepper, and bound with extra virgin olive oil. It sometimes called pesto rosso or red pesto, and has considerably less basil than the more common pesto genovese.

The dish was introduced in ancient times by Genoese ships, coming from the east and stopping at the port of Trapani, who brought the tradition of agliata, a sort of pesto sauce based on garlic and walnuts, which was then developed by Trapani sailors with the products of their land, notably tomato and almonds.

Busiati with pesto trapanese is listed as a prodotto agroalimentare tradizionale (PAT) by the Italian Ministry of Agricultural, Food and Forestry Policies.

== See also ==
Media related to Pesto alla trapanese at Wikimedia Commons

- Sicilian cuisine
