= Scialatielli =

Type of pasta

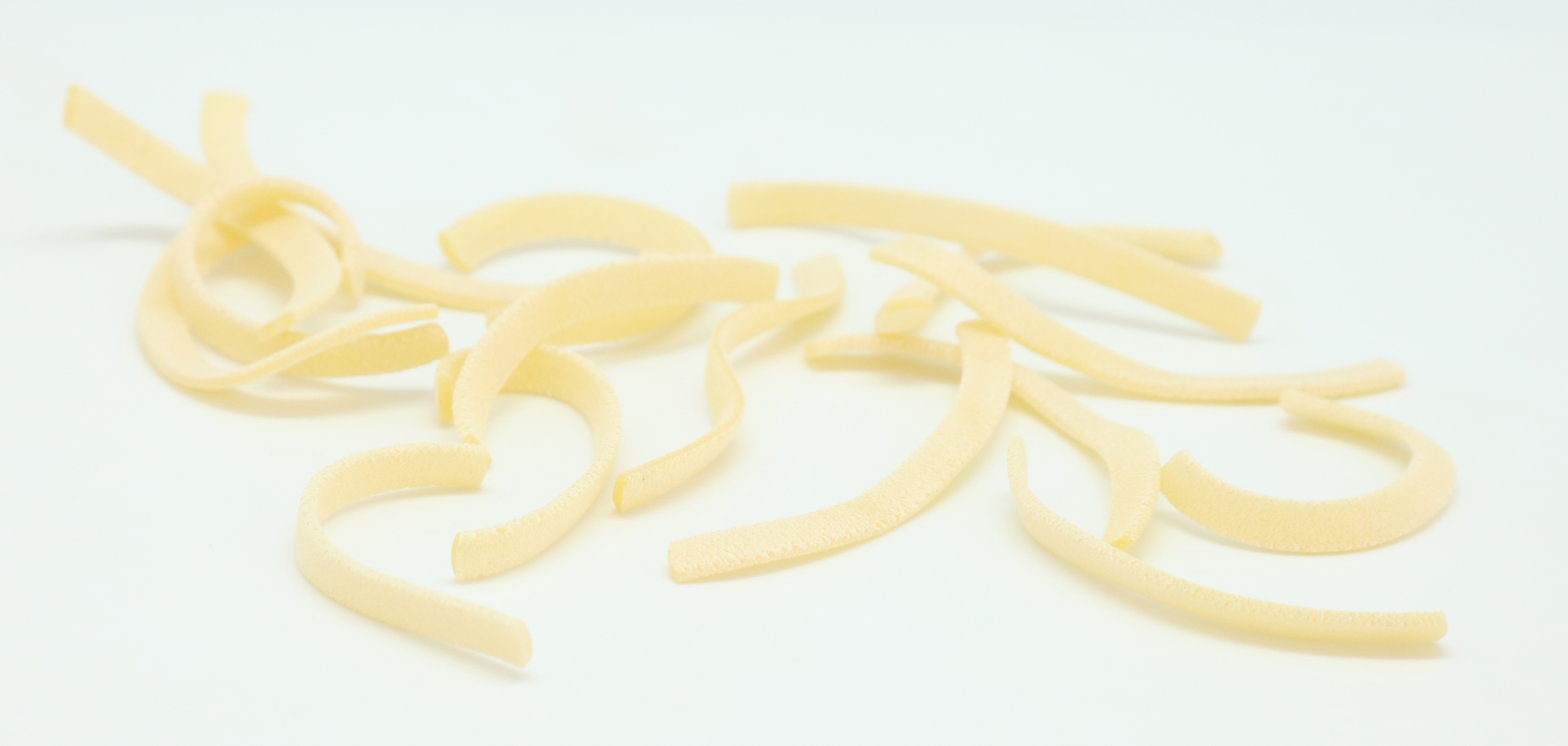
- Alternative names: Scialatelli, sciliatielli, scivatieddi
- Type: Pasta
- Place of origin: Italy
- Region or state: Amalfi Coast
- Created by: Enrico Cosentino

Scialatielli or scialatelli (Italian: [ʃalaˈt(j)ɛlli]), also known as sciliatielli or scivatieddi, is a short, thick pasta with a rectangular cross section and an irregular, slightly curved shape. It is typical of modern Campanian cuisine, having originated on the Amalfi Coast as a chef's specialty, but it has also spread to nearby areas such as Catanzaro, Calabria, and Potenza, Basilicata.

A scialatelli dough is formed with milk and eggs and flavoured with parmesan. Depending on the sauce the pasta will be eaten with, either basil or parsley leaves are added—parsley for seafood or zucchini, and basil for eggplant. The resulting pasta is chewy, described by food writer Arthur Schwartz as "a cross between pasta and gnocchi".

Scialatelli is among the most recently invented pastas. The chef Enrico Cosentino devised the shape in the late 1960s in his native Amalfi while working in a local restaurant, and it gained recognition in 1978, when he won the Entremétier prize in an international culinary contest. Schwartz reports he was informed by Amalfitani chefs that when scialatelli was unknown outside the coast and only made in homes, it was primarily served with either sauteed zucchini and onions, or eggplant fried with garlic, moistened before serving with pasta water. By the 1990s, scialatelli was more often served with a seafood sauce.

Scialatiello (singular for scialatielli) may come from Neapolitan scigliatiello or sciliatiello, a derivative of the verb sciglià ('to ruffle'), and it roughly translates to "ruffled": scialatelli look like "ruffled" strips of pasta when set in a dish, as each strip has a slightly irregular shape after being hand-made and cut with a kitchen knife. Another theory is that it comes from Neapolitan scialà ('to enjoy' or 'to spend a lot') and tiella ('pan').

== See also ==
- List of pasta
