= Busiate =

Type of pasta

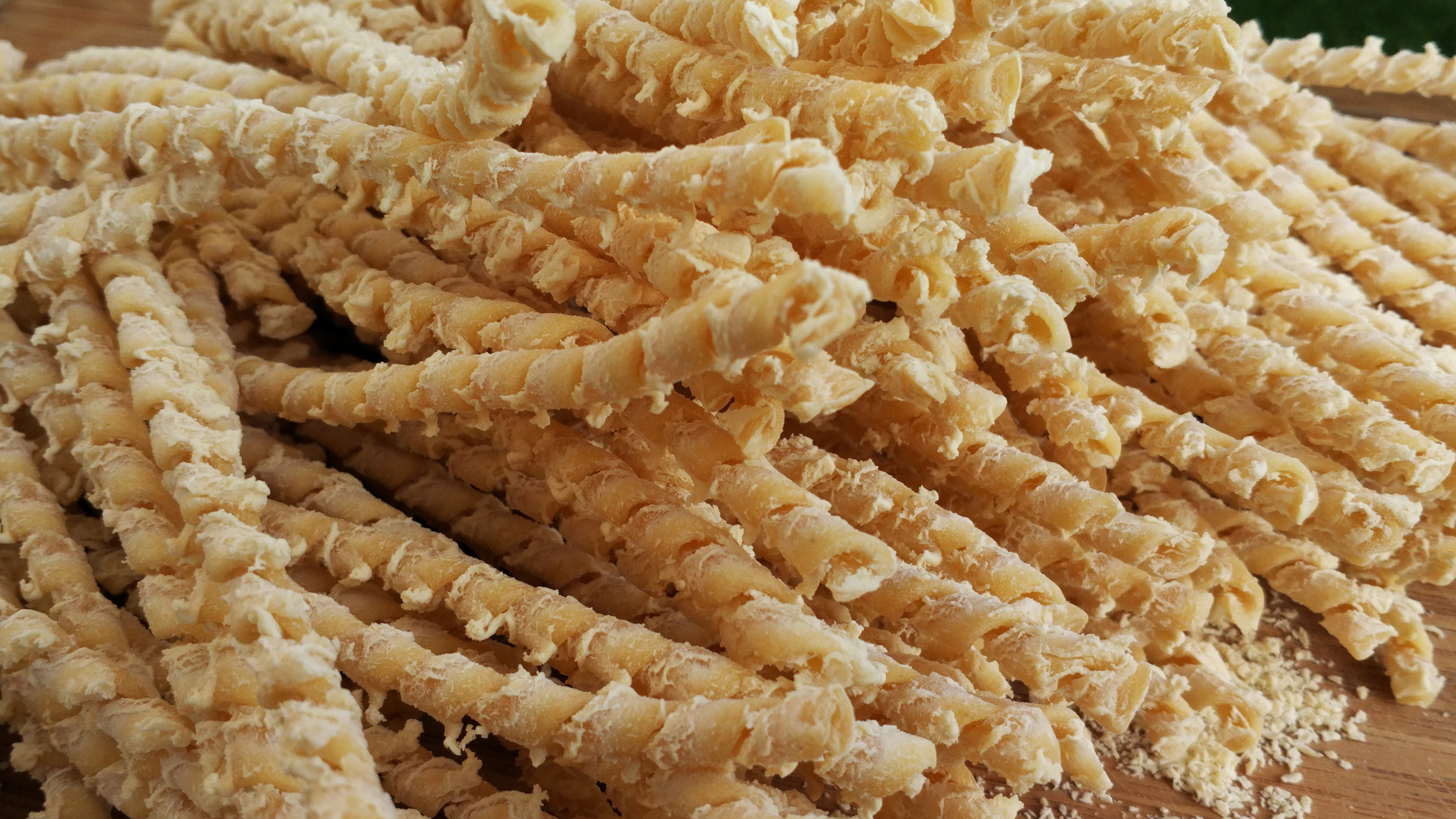
- Alternative names: Busiati, subioti, fusarioi, maccheroni bobbesi, busa, ciuffolitti (Abruzzo), gnocchi del ferro
- Type: Pasta
- Place of origin: Italy
- Region or state: Sicily
- Main ingredients: Durum wheat, water
- Variations: Maccheroni inferrati (or firrichedi)

Busiate or busiati are a type of long macaroni, originating in the province of Trapani and typical of the Calabria and Sicily regions of Italy. They take their name from busa, the Sicilian word for the stem of Ampelodesmos mauritanicus, a local grass, which is used in preparing them and giving them their helical shape. Busiate was officially included in the 2026 edition of the Italian dictionary Zingarelli.

The name busiate can be used to describe two different shapes, although the basic coiling technique is similar:

- Busiate trapanesi are traditionally prepared by diagonally coiling a strand of pasta around a twig of ampelodesmos.
- Maccheroni inferrati are coiled vertically around a long pin, such as a knitting needle. Their shape is closer to that of bucatini.

Busiate are traditionally served with pesto alla trapanese, a sauce made of almonds, tomatoes, garlic, and basil.

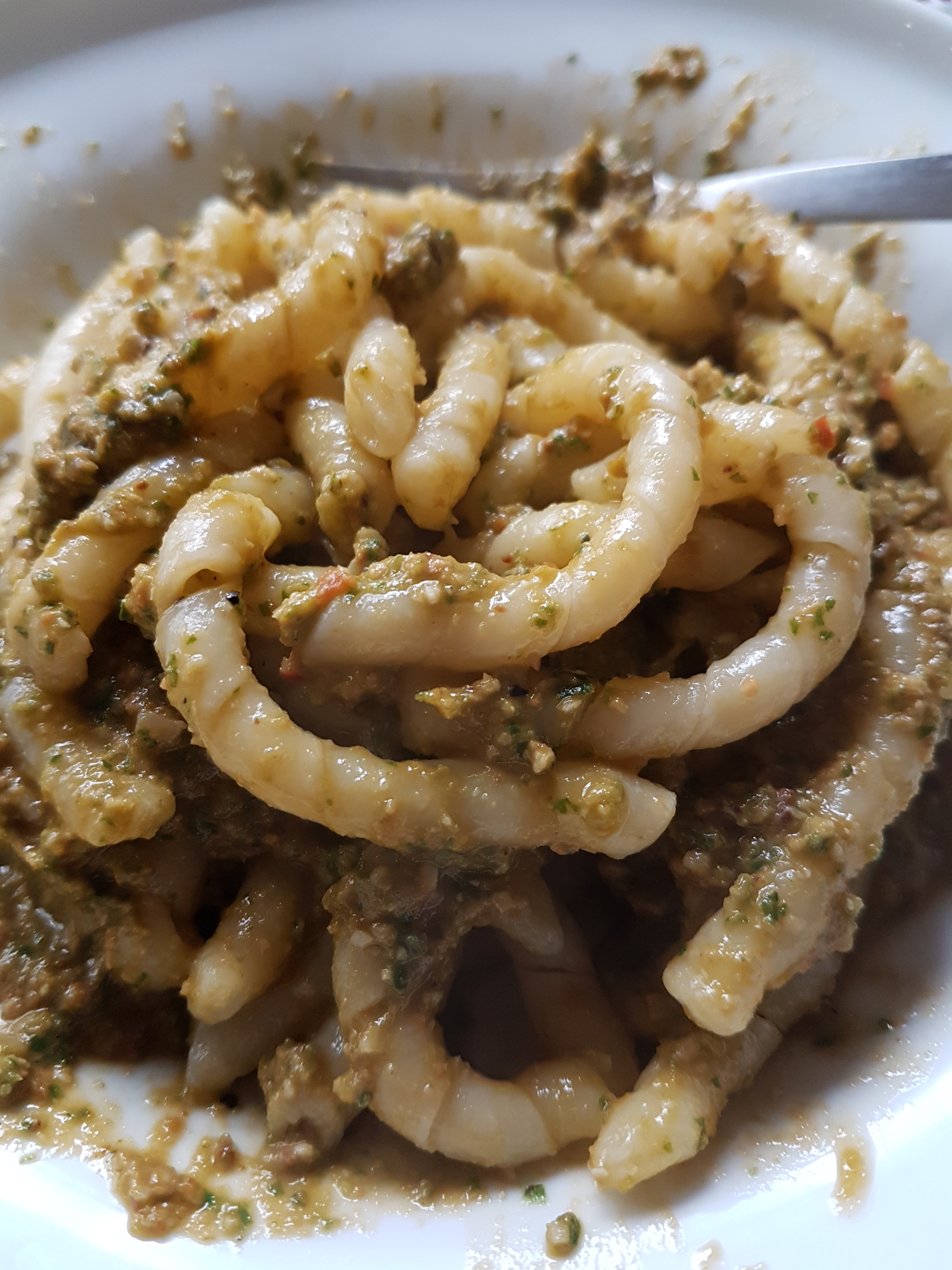
Busiate served with pesto alla trapanese

== See also ==
Media related to Busiate at Wikimedia Commons

- List of pasta
- Bucatini
