= Maltagliati =

Type of pasta

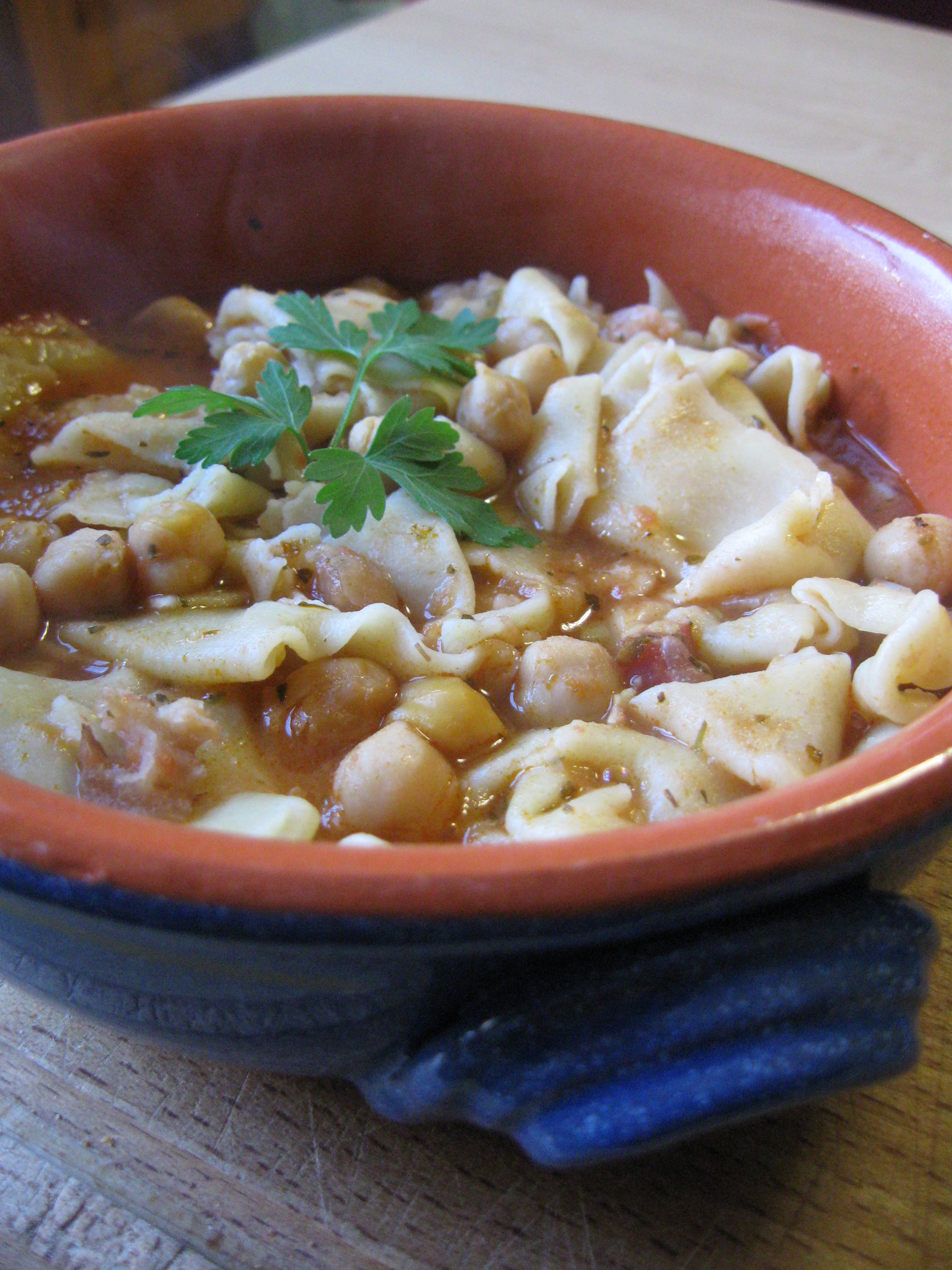
Maltagliati

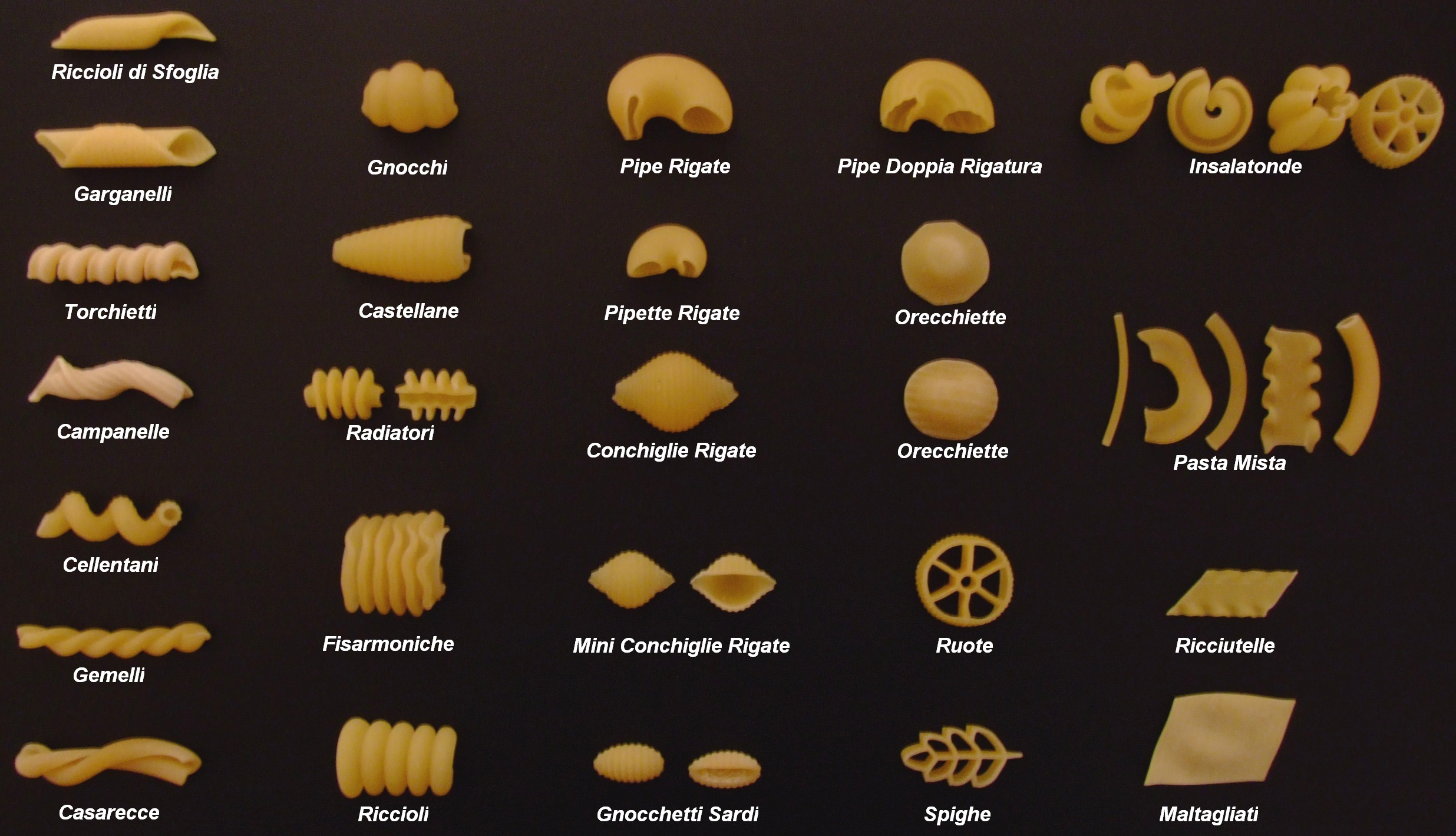
Pasta designs, including maltagliati

Maltagliati (Italian: [maltaʎˈʎaːti]), also known as puntarine, are a type of pasta typical of the Emilia-Romagna region of Italy. In the manufacture of pasta such as tagliatelle, dough is rolled and then cut into thin strips, producing noodles. The excess parts of the dough, generally the edges, are left with irregular shape and thickness, therefore "poorly cut" or, in Italian, maltagliati. Maltagliati are therefore cut from such scrap pieces of pasta, and differ in shape, size and thickness.

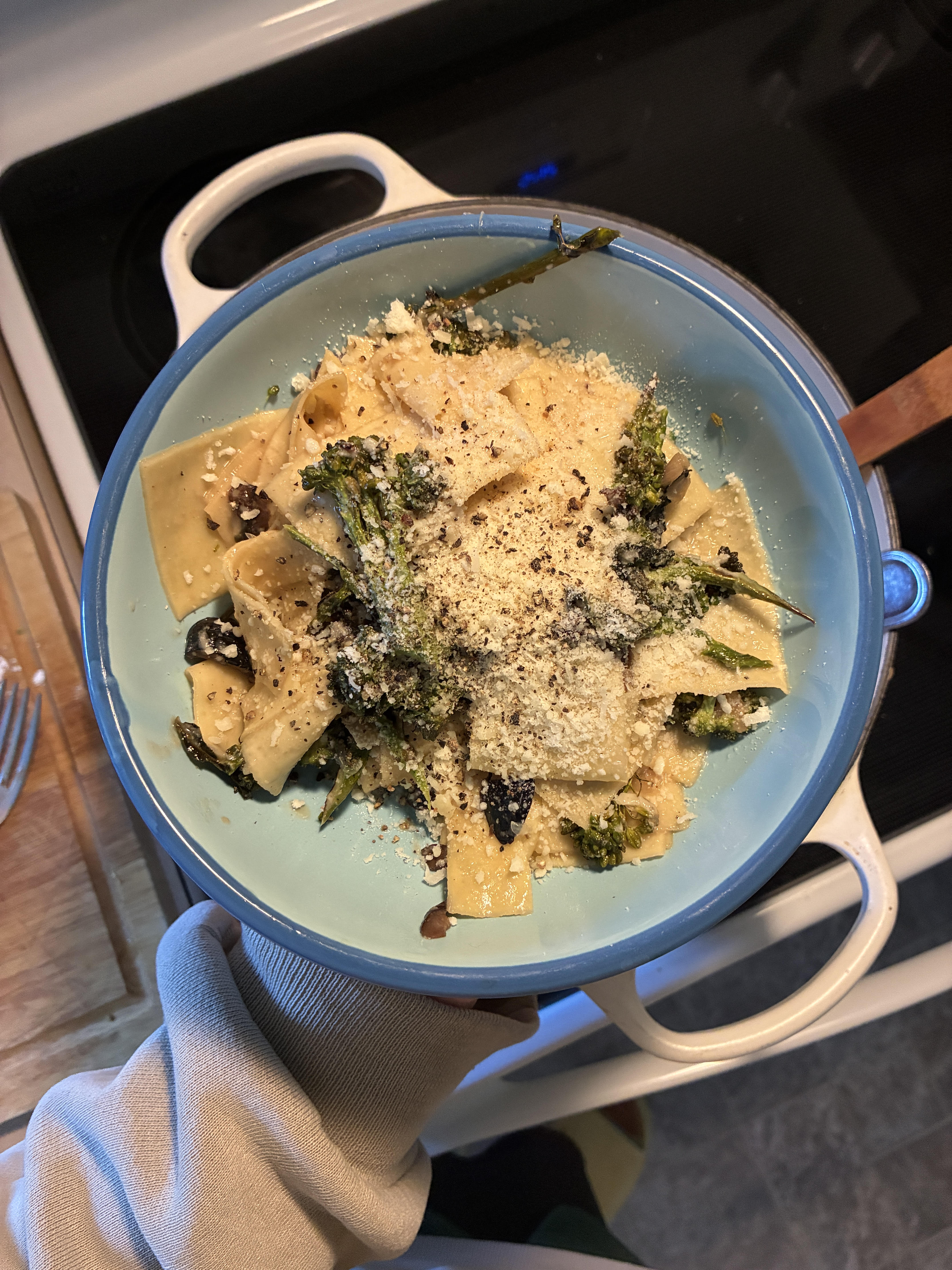
A bowl of tagliardi, a modern pasta shape inspired by maltagliati, with broccolini and cured black olives.

As probable food for the poor, recipes for maltagliati generally call for simple, inexpensive ingredients. The most classic use of maltagliati is in bean soup, but there are several other recipes involving them.

Cipriani produces a pasta shape called tagliardi, a contemporary take on maltagliati.

== Origin ==
Modern maltagliati show a close resemblance to those known from ancient Roman and Greek literary sources. This could be a hint of their origin.

== See also ==
- List of pasta
