= Venetian cuisine =

Cuisine of the Veneto region

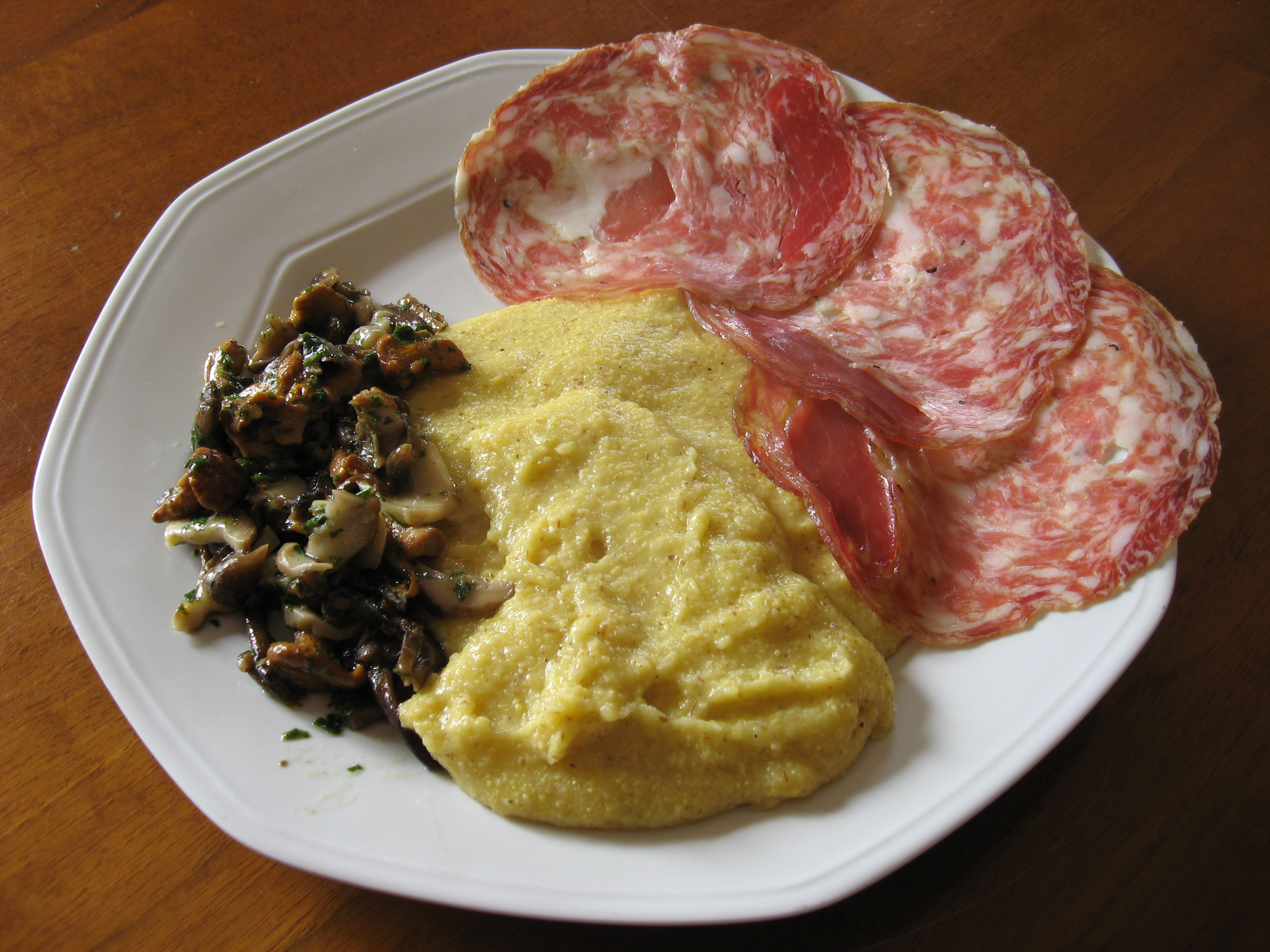
Polenta served with sopressa and mushrooms, a traditional peasant food of Veneto

Venetian cuisine, from the Veneto region, has a centuries-long history and differs significantly from other cuisines of northern Italy (notably Friuli-Venezia Giulia and Trentino-Alto Adige/Südtirol), and of neighbouring Austria and of Slavic countries (notably Slovenia and Croatia), despite sharing some commonalities.

== Overview ==
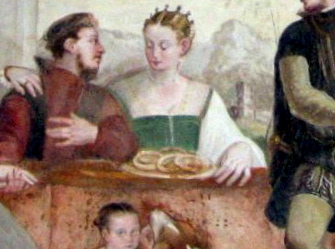
Food and drink have played an important role in Venetian culture for centuries. This image shows a 16th-century fresco in the Villa Caldogno, where some noblemen and noblewomen enjoy merenda, or a mid-afternoon snack, eating bussoli, or typical sweets from Vicenza.

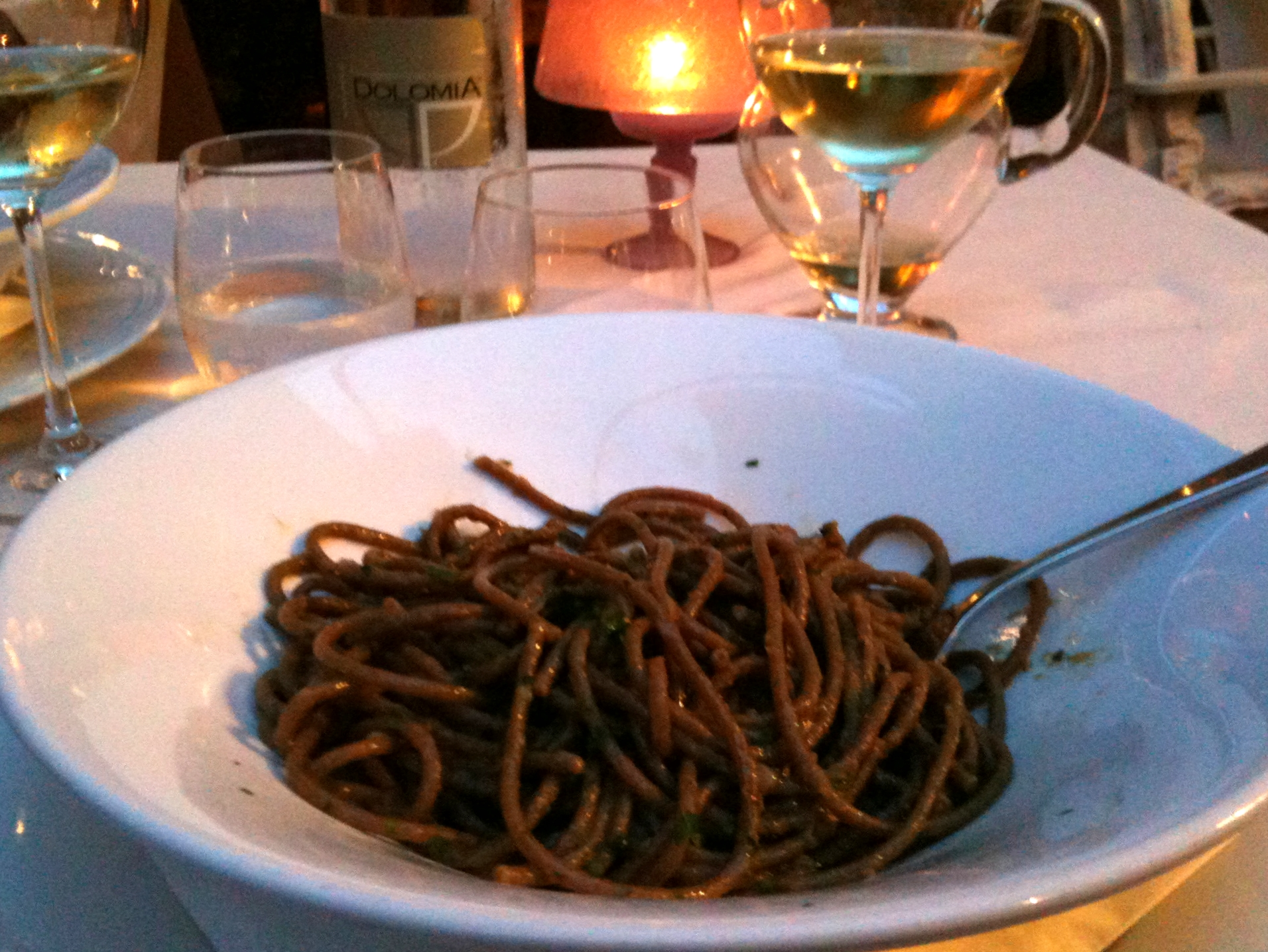
Bigoli in salsa

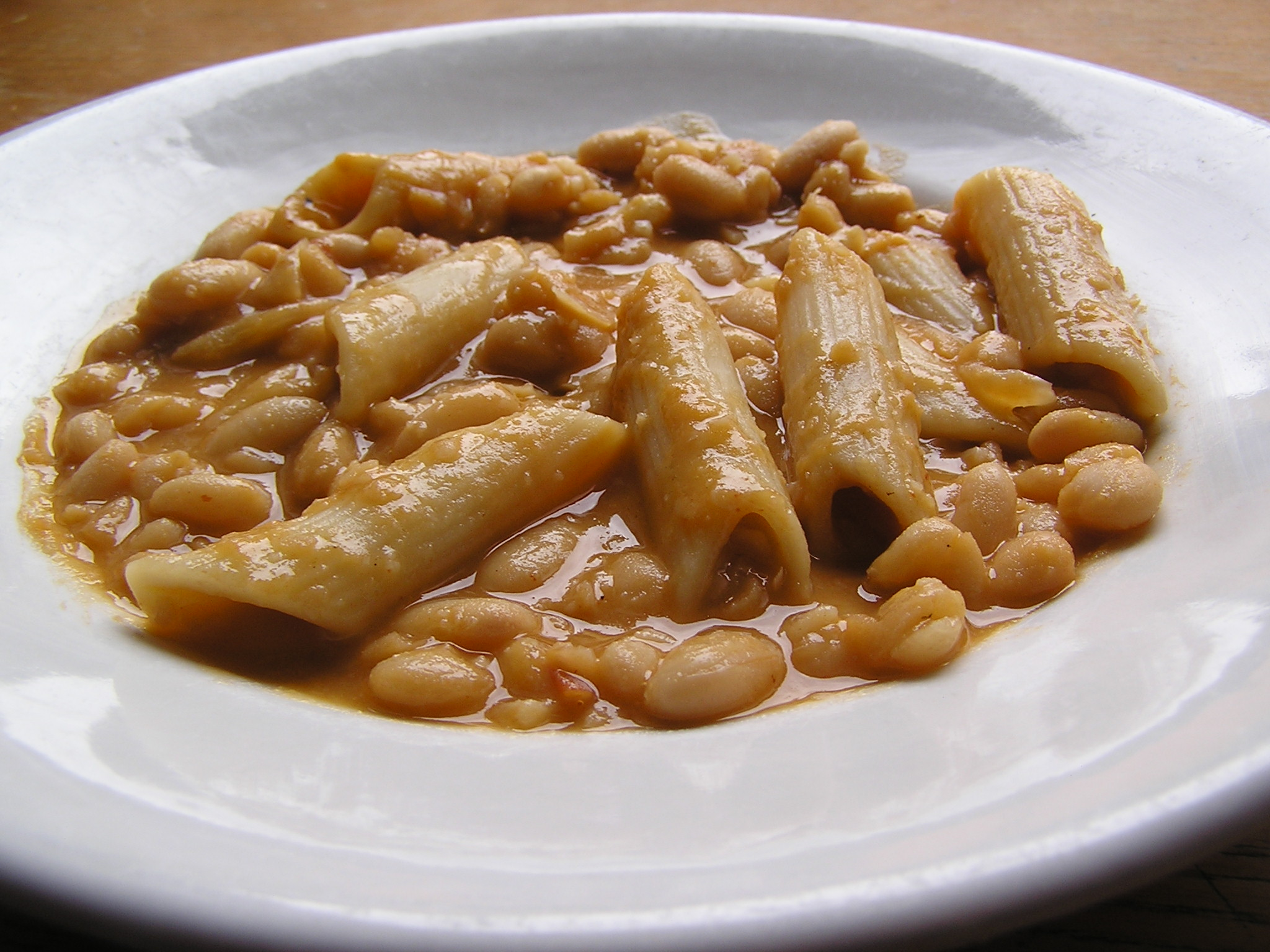
Pasta e fagioli

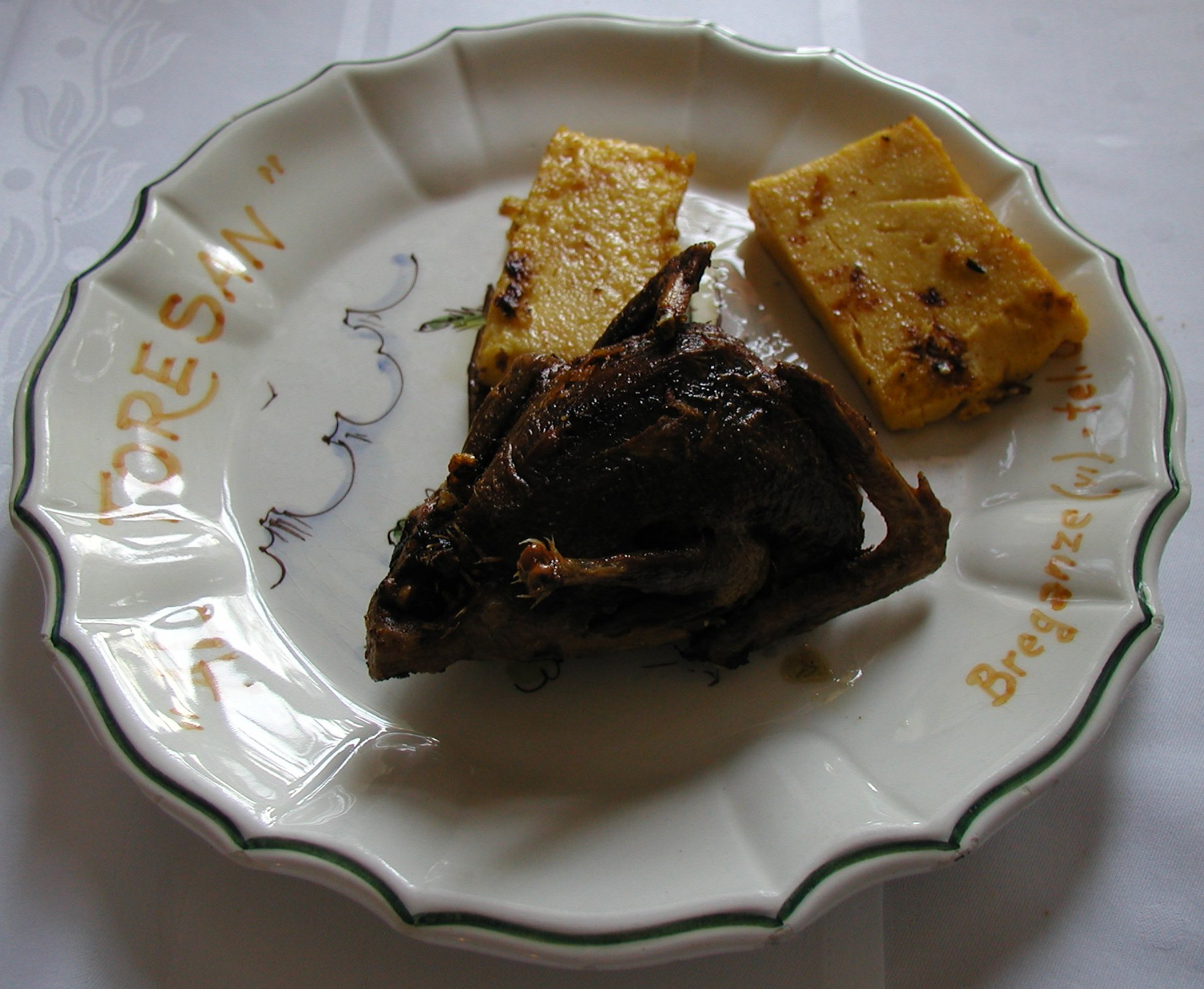
Polenta e osei

Cuisine in Veneto may be divided into three main categories, based on geography: the coastal areas, the plains, and the mountains. Each one (especially the plains) can have many local cuisines, each city with its own dishes.

The most common dish is polenta, which is cooked in various ways within the local cuisines of Veneto. Polenta once was the universal staple food of the poorer classes, who could afford little else. In Veneto, the corns are ground in much smaller fragments in comparison with the rest of Italy: so, when cooked, it resembles a pudding.

Typical of many coastal areas, communities along the coast of the Venetian Lagoon serve mainly seafood dishes.

In the plains it is very popular to serve grilled meat (often by a barbecue, and in a mix of pork, beef and chicken meat) together with grilled polenta, potatoes or vegetables. Other popular dishes include risotto, rice cooked with many different kinds of food, from vegetables, mushrooms, pumpkin or radicchio to seafood, pork meat or chicken livers. Bigoli (a typical Venetian fresh pasta, similar to udon), fettuccine (hand-made noodles), ravioli and the similar tortelli (filled with meat, cheese, vegetables or pumpkin) and gnocchi (potatoes-made fresh pasta), are fresh and often hand-made pasta dishes (made of eggs and wheat flour), served together with meat sauce (ragù) often made with duck meat, sometimes together with mushrooms or peas, or simply with melted butter.

Cuisine from the mountain areas is mainly made of pork or game meat, with polenta, as well as mushrooms or cheeses (made by cow milk), and some dish from Austrian or Tyrolese tradition, such as canederli or strudel. A typical dish is casunziei, hand-made fresh pasta similar to ravioli.

Among the typical seasoning of Venetian cuisine, you can find butter, olive oil, sunflower oil, vinegar, kren, senape, mostarda, salsa verde.

In his book La cucina veneziana, Giuseppe Maffioli discusses how Jewish cuisine deeply influenced Venetian culinary practices. Venice adopted numerous Jewish dishes, such as vegetables prepared alla giudia, various salt cod recipes, almond-based pastries, and puff pastry. A notable example is pesce in saor—fried fish marinated with vinegar, raisins, pine nuts, and eggplants—which initially alarmed Venetians who thought it might be harmful. Additionally, the Jewish habit of preparing risottos with a variety of vegetables became commonplace in Venetian kitchens. Locally, the term alia giudia refers to tomato sauce.

The following are dishes typical of the three subregions of the Veneto. The page for Venetian language provides additional information on writing and pronouncing the dishes' names.

Venice and many surrounding parts of Veneto are known for risotto, a dish whose ingredients can highly vary upon different areas. Fish and seafood are added in regions closer to the coast while pumpkin, asparagus, radicchio, and frog legs appear farther away from the Adriatic Sea.

Made from finely ground maize meal, polenta is a traditional, rural food typical of Veneto and most of northern Italy. It may be included in stirred dishes and baked dishes. Polenta can be served with various cheese, stockfish or meat dishes. Some polenta dishes include porcini, rapini, or other vegetables or meats, such as small songbirds in the case of the Venetian and Lombard dish polenta e osei, or sausages. In some areas of Veneto it can be also made of a particular variety of cornmeal, named biancoperla, so that the colour of polenta is white and not yellow (the so-called polenta bianca).

Beans, peas, and other legumes are seen in these areas with pasta e fagioli (lit. 'beans and pasta') and risi e bisi (lit. 'rice and peas'). Venice features heavy dishes using exotic spices and sauces. Ingredients such as stockfish or simple marinated anchovies are found here as well.

Less fish and more meat is eaten away from the coast. Other typical products are sausages such as sopressa, garlic salami, Piave cheese, and Asiago cheese. High quality vegetables are prized, such as red radicchio from Treviso and white asparagus from Bassano del Grappa. Perhaps the most popular dish of Venice is fegato alla veneziana, thinly sliced veal liver sautéed with onions.

Squid and cuttlefish are common ingredients, as is squid ink, called nero di seppia. Regional desserts include tiramisu (made of biscuits dipped in coffee, layered with a whipped mixture of egg yolks and mascarpone, and flavoured with liquor and cocoa), baicoli (biscuits made with butter and vanilla), and nougat.

The most celebrated Venetian wines include Bardolino, Prosecco, Soave, Amarone, and Valpolicella DOC wines.

== Venice and the lagoon ==
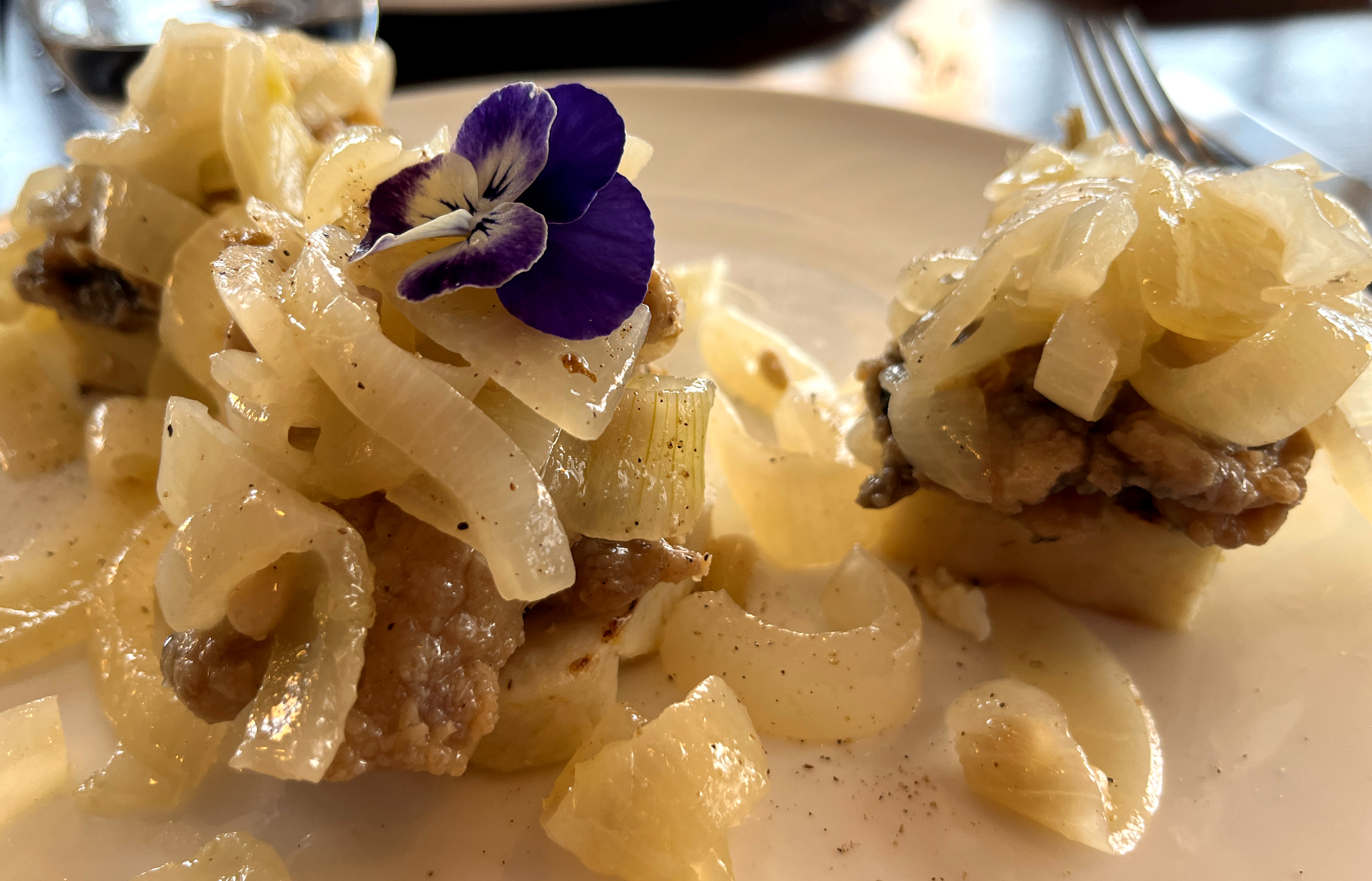
Sarde in saor

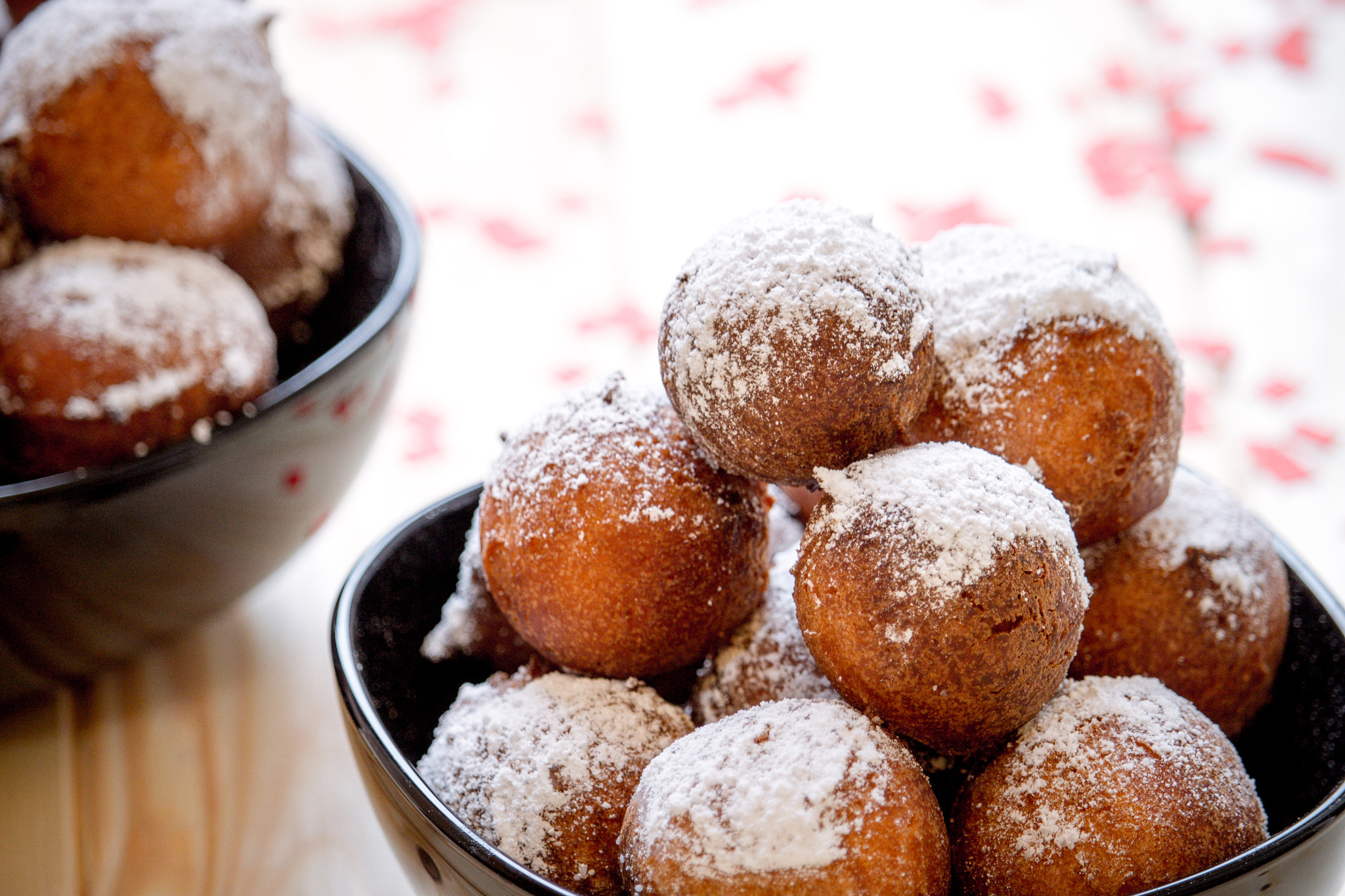
Frìtoła

- Bigoli in salsa: bigoli pasta served with an anchovy and onion sauce
- Fegato alla veneziana: liver, chopped and cooked together with chopped onions
- Moleche: soft-shell crab of the species Carcinus maenas, generally fried. Moleche are very valuable because the process of molting in the brackish lagoons only lasts a few hours, after which the shell hardens and the crab is again called maxenete
- Pasta e fagioli: bean soup with noodles (typically long, rough pasta)
- Polenta e schie: small shrimp from the lagoon, fried and perched on a bed of soft white polenta
- Risi e bisi: risotto with pancetta and peas cooked in a broth
- Risotto di gò, also called di Burano: risotto made with broth from the grass goby (Zosterisessor ophiocephalus), locally called the gò or ghiozzo
- Sarde in saor: fried sardines, dipped in onions partially fried in the same oil, raisins, pine nuts (traditionally only during winter to increase calories), and other spices, sprinkled with plenty of vinegar, and all left to marinate for at least one night
- Seppie al nero: cuttlefish cooked with its ink

Among the many Venetian desserts, the most well-known are:

- Baicoli
- Frìtoła (frittella or frittola in Italian)
- Galàni (or cróstoli): angel wings
- Pinza (or pinsa): an Epiphany cake made with cornmeal, mixed dried fruits (usually figs and raisins), and nuts
- Zaeti (or zaleti): cornmeal biscotti with raisins

== Verona ==
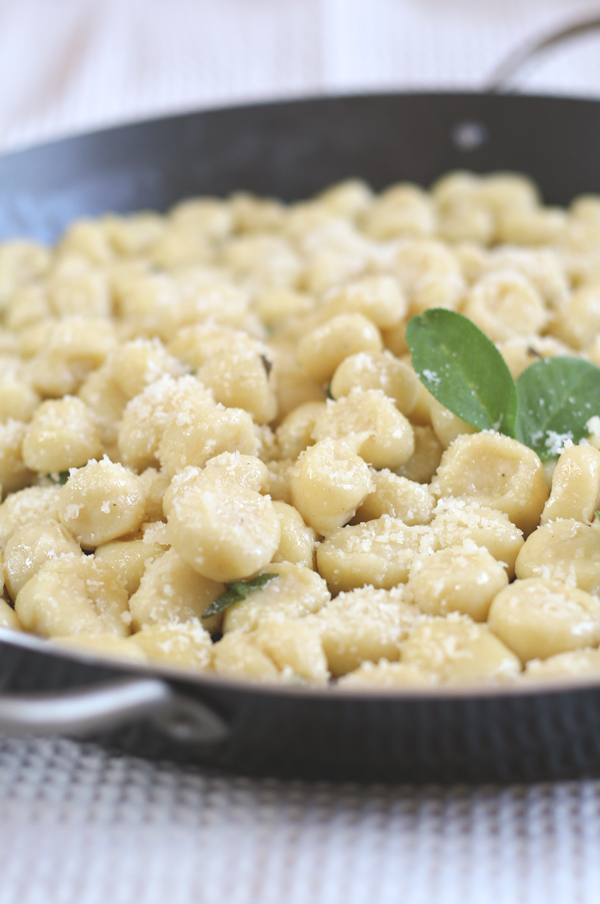
Gnocchi of ricotta cheese dressed in butter and sage

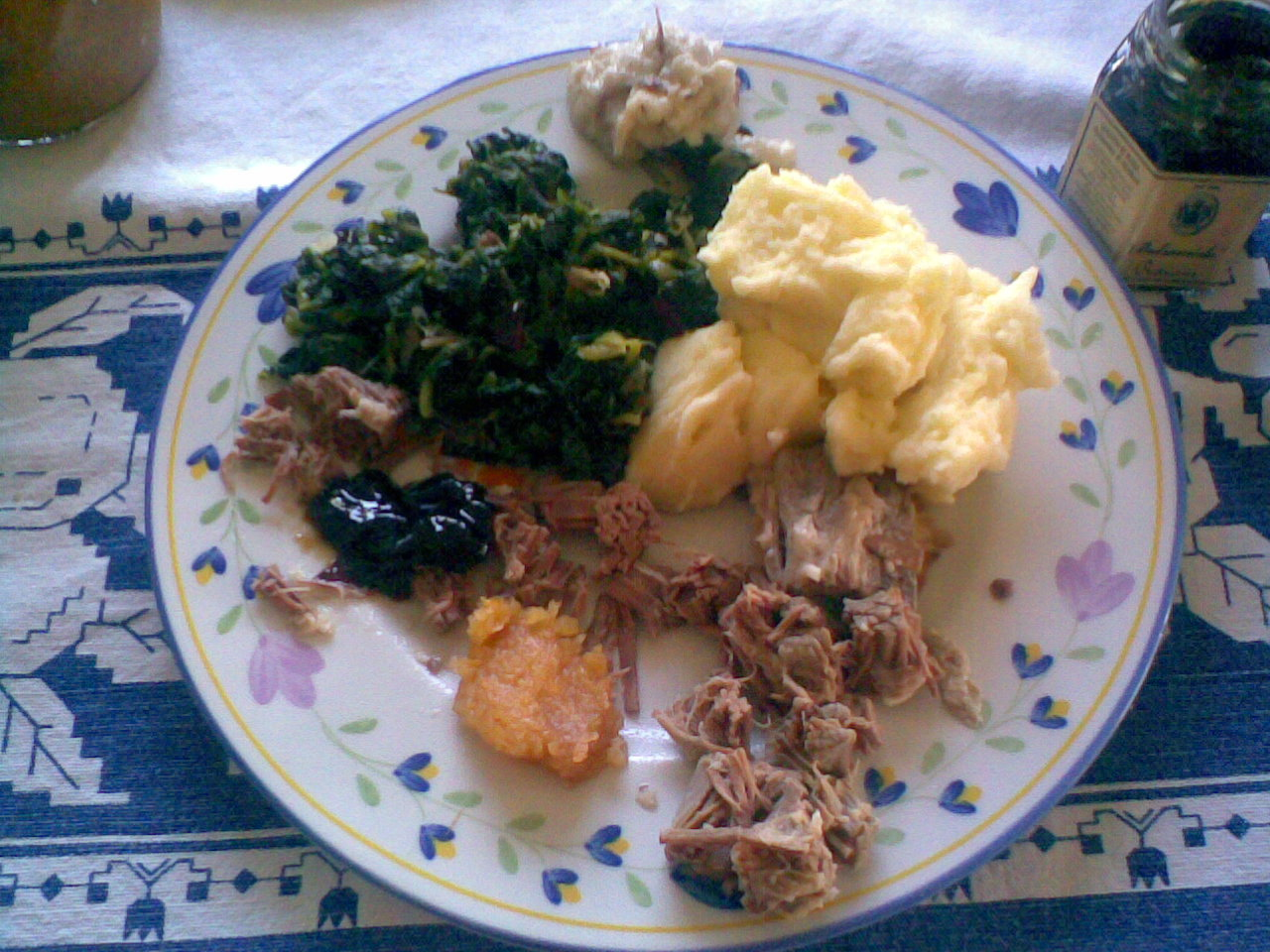
Bollito misto served with spinach, mostarda vicentina, purée and balsamic vinegar jelly

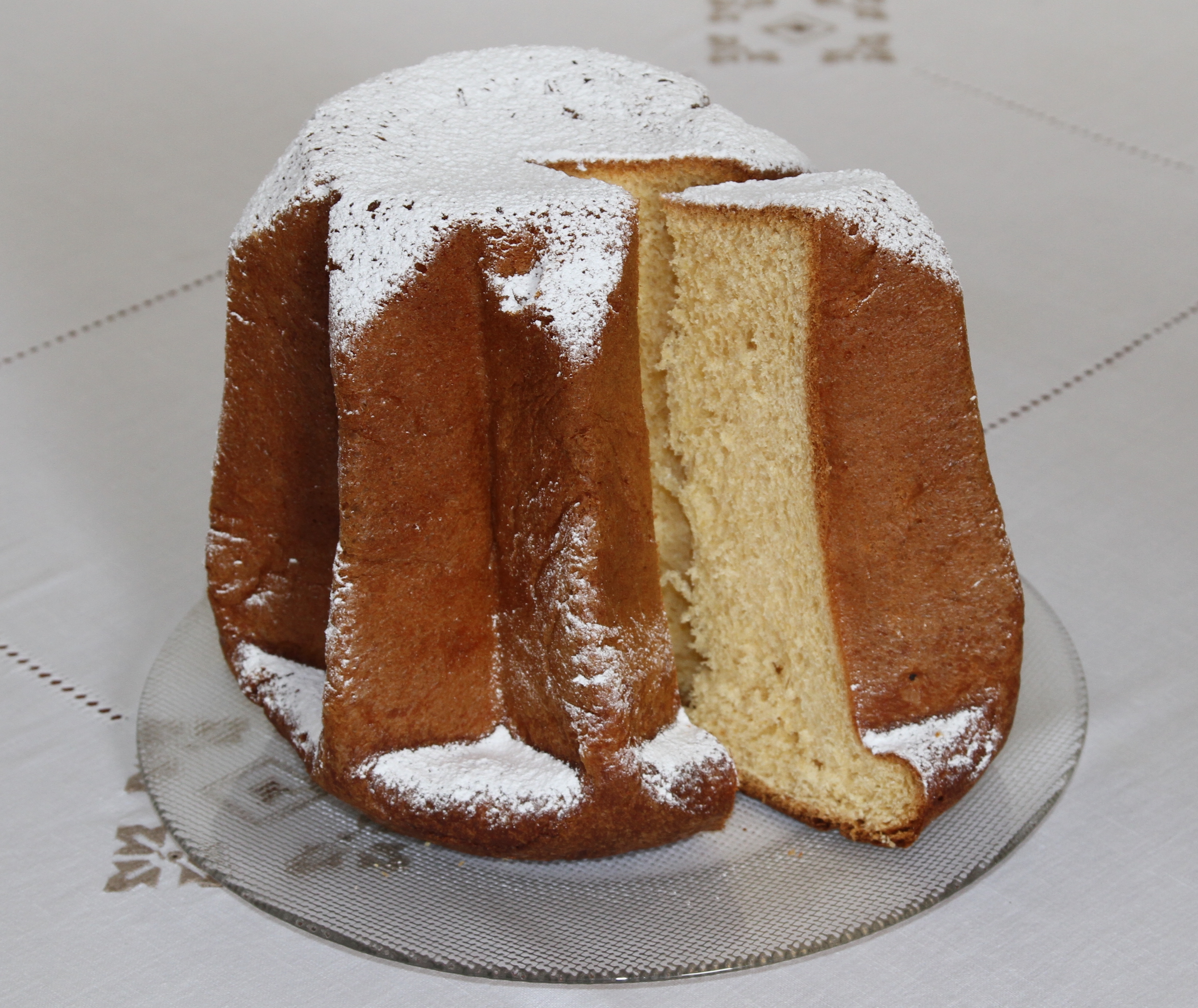
Pandoro

- Brasato all'Amarone: braised beef meat cooked with Amarone wine, often served together with polenta
- Gnocchi. It is traditional to eat homemade potato gnocchi on Venerdì Gnocolar, the last Friday of Carnival.
- Lesso e pearà. Lesso is the bollito misto popular across entire northern Italy, that in Verona is uniquely served with pearà: a thick, slow-cooking sauce made from the boiled meats' stock, grated stale bread, ox marrow and abundant ground black pepper. Some recipes also add olive oil, grated Parmesan or butter. The sauce's name comes from pear, dialect for pepper; hence pearà, 'peppered'. In the past this was a lavish meal for the majority of the populace and therefore served on major festivities like Christmas.
- Pastissada de caval: an ancient horse meat stew dating back to the Middle-Age. It is prepared with bay leaves, nutmeg, cloves, salt, pepper, vegetables, and beef stock and slow cooked until the meat melts; it's served with polenta.
- Polenta e renga: polenta accompanied by typical oil preserved herrings. Salted herrings (renga) are boiled or grilled, then cleaned, cut into pieces, and pickled in olive oil with garlic, parsley and capers; after 40 days of maturation, the herrings are ready to be served or put into jars for preservation. This dish originated in the Parona neighbourhood of Verona (and more broadly or the whole city) and is traditionally eaten on Ash Wednesday.
- Riso Vialone Nano: a rice variety typical of southern Veronese lowlands (Bassa Veronese). It lends itself best to the preparation of excellent risottos, and used as such throughout Veneto and Italy.
- Risotto all'Amarone: risotto with the local Amarone red wine. It is typical of the Valpolicella wine region.
- Risotto al tastasal: risotto made with the same seasoned ground pork used in salame and sausages; traditionally this dish was a mean of tasting the mix before making sausages (hence the name tastasal, 'to taste salt').
- Tortellini di Valeggio sul Mincio: hand-made fresh pasta of tortellini kind, stuffed with a mix of beef, pork meats and vegetables, usually served with melted butter and sage. They are typical of the town of Valeggio sul Mincio, southwest of Verona.

=== Desserts ===
- Mandorlato: typical hard torrone, made in the town of Cologna Veneta
- Nadalin: an ancient predecessor of the pandoro. It has a flatter shape and firmer texture than its more famous counterpart.
- Pandoro: the traditional Christmas sweet yeast bread, now well-known and eaten all over Italy
- Tiramisu: a relatively recent recipe that has allegedly been invented in Treviso in the late 1960s

== Vicenza ==
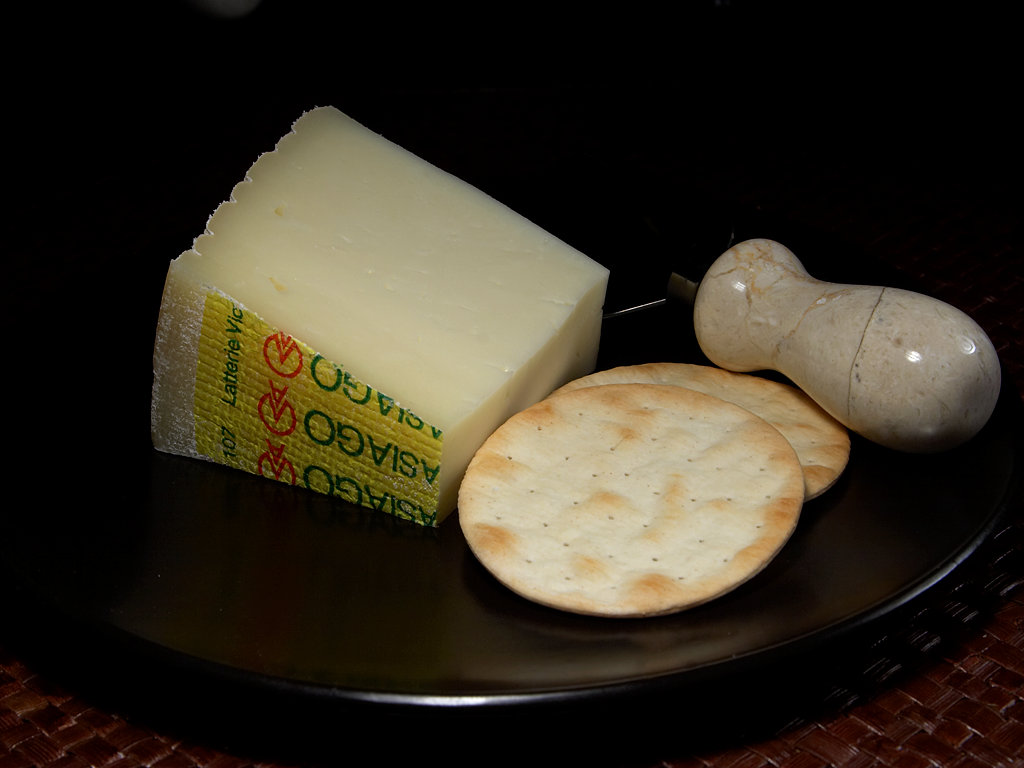
Asiago cheese

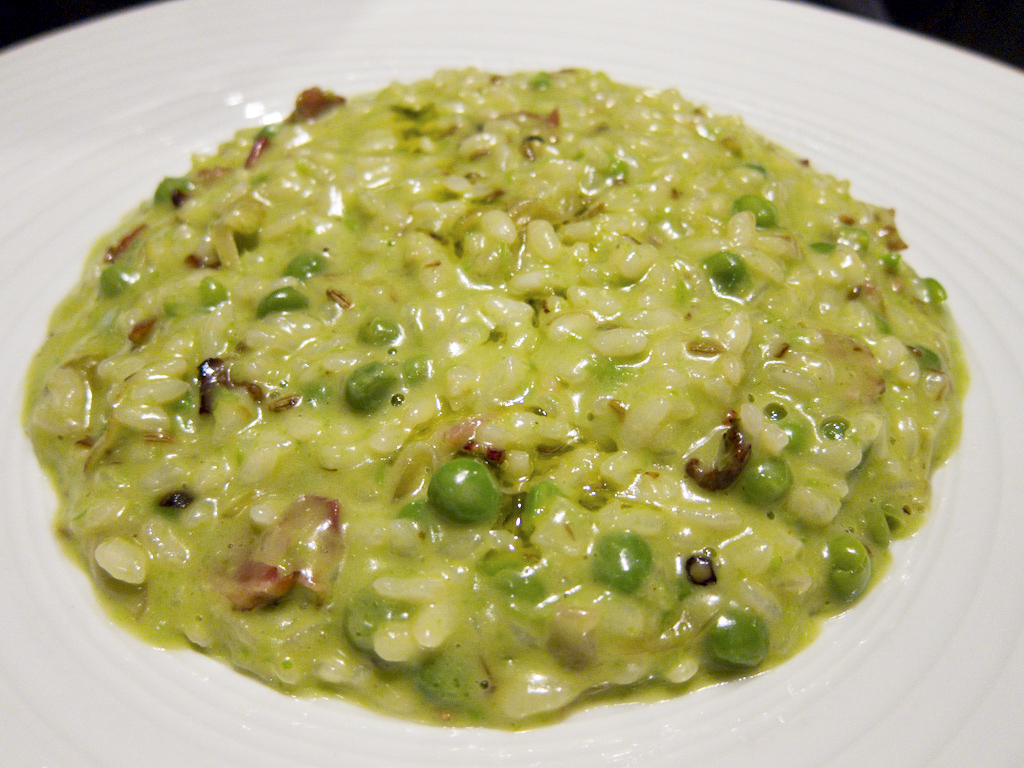
Risi e bisi

Vicenza, along with Venice, has one of the most distinctive cuisines in the Veneto. Previously, the Vicentians were often referred to as the magnagati or mangiagatti (meaning 'cat eaters') due to the alleged presence of cats in their cuisine (caused from poverty in the past and during World War II), though the cooking of cats is now illegal in Italy. Typical plates of the city and the surrounding area include:

- Asiago cheese
- Baccalà alla vicentina
- Bassano del Grappa asparaguses
- I bixi de Lumignan and i bixi de Borso (bixi means 'peas')
- Cren: horseradish. It's usually finely grated and mixed with vinegar into a sauce that accompanies boiled meats.
- Nanto truffles
- Paèta al malgaragno (young turkey with pomegranate juice)
- Risi e bisi (rice and peas)
- Rotzo potatoes
- Rubbio celery
- Semi-liquid polenta (sometimes served with tomato sauce or purée)
- Serexe de Marostega (Marostica cherries)
- Torexani de Breganse

== Other provinces and regional dishes ==
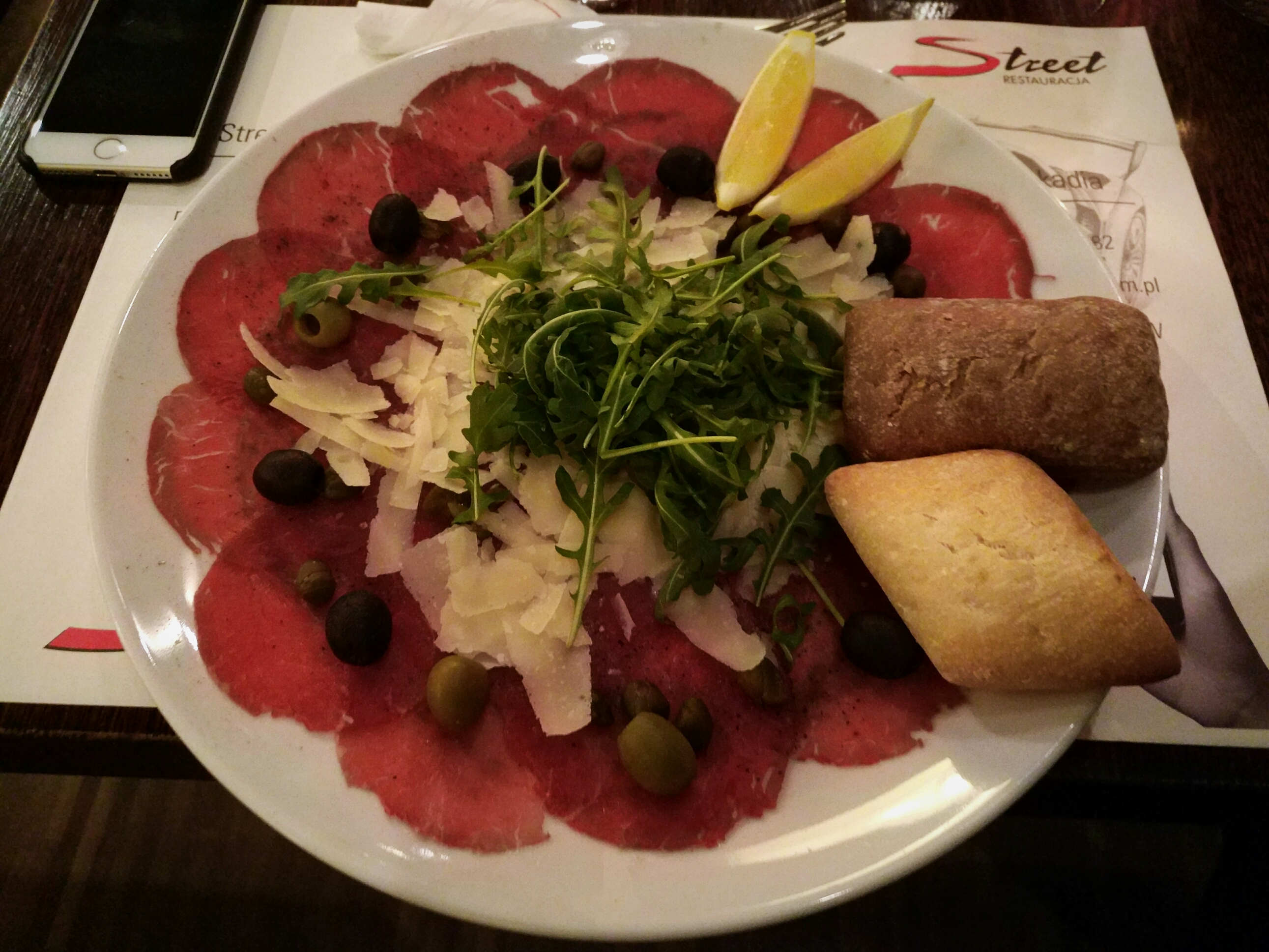
Carpaccio

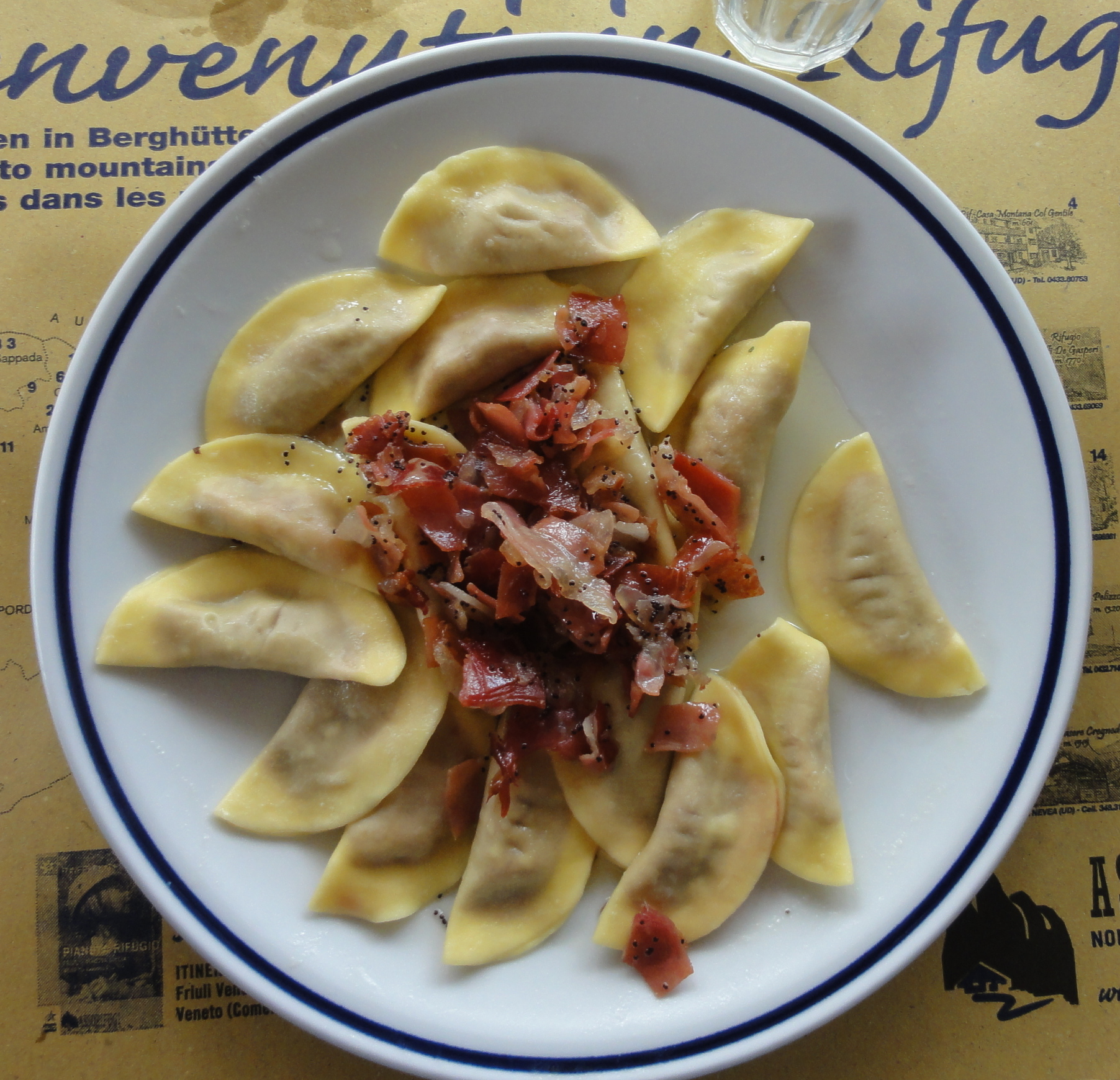
Casunziei

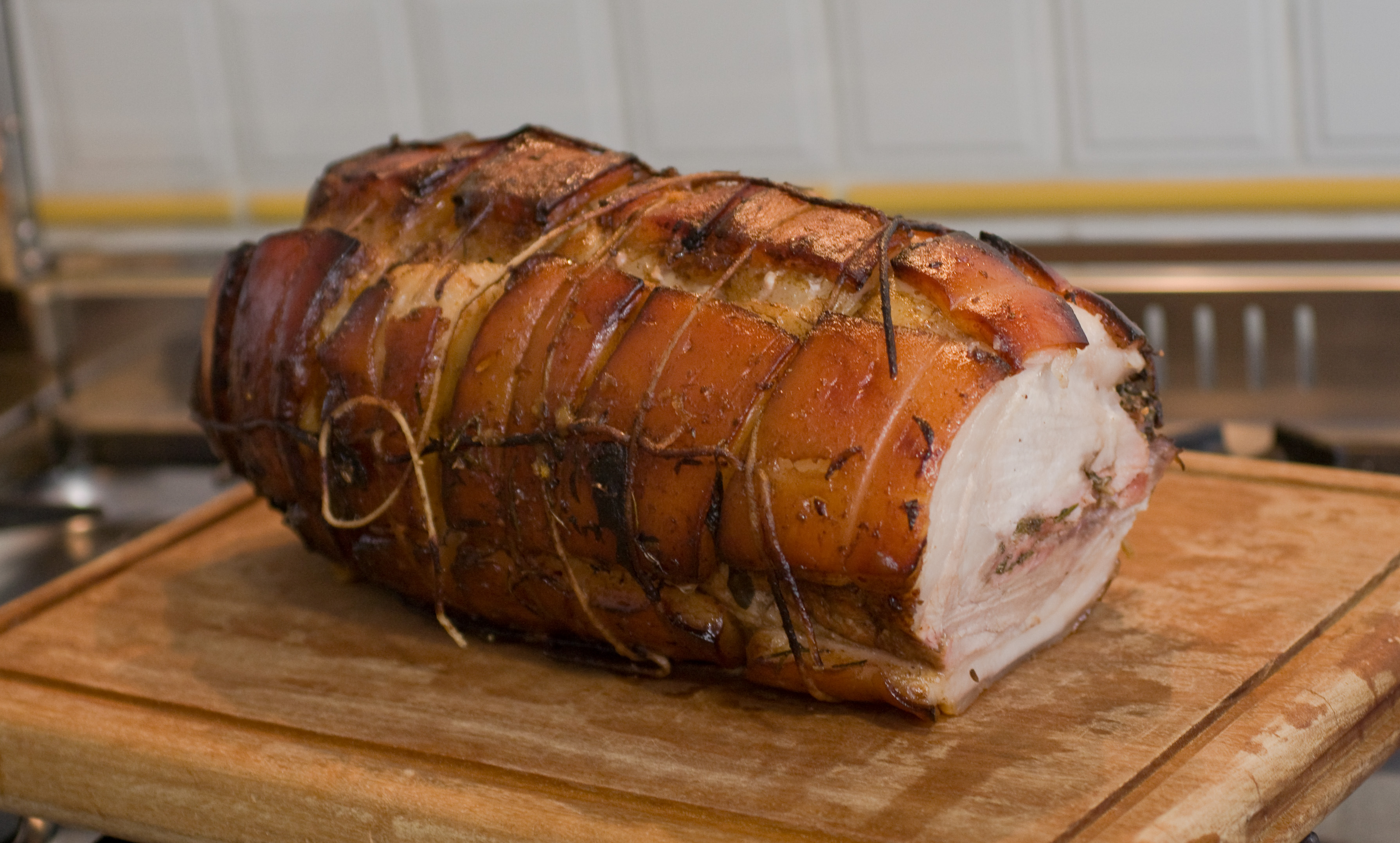
Porchetta

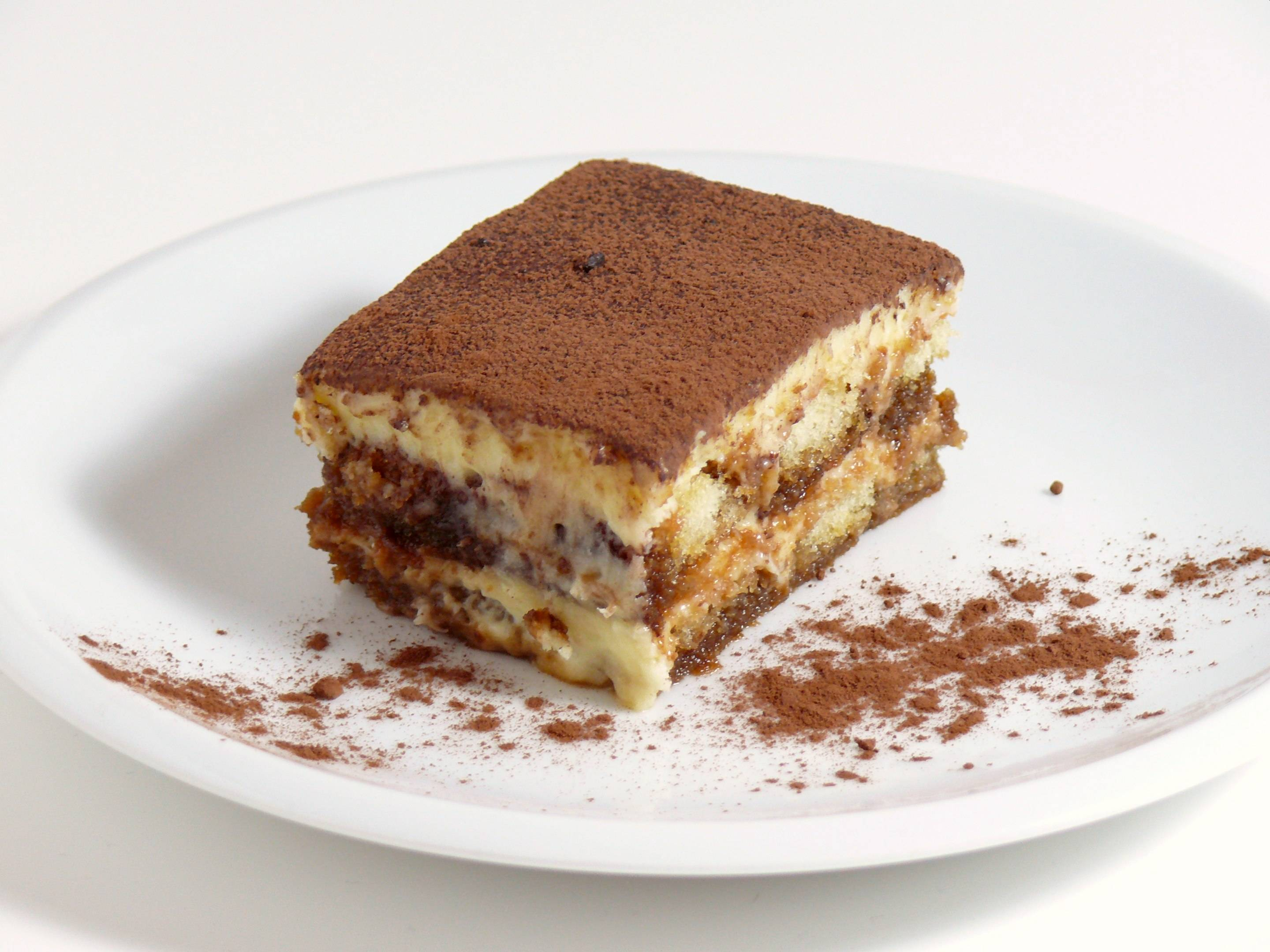
Tiramisu, a well-known dessert from the Veneto region

- Bigoli co' l'arna: bigoli pasta served together with a duck meat sauce
- Bixàto (or anguilla): eel; a typical dish of south-eastern Veneto, in the delta of River Po. It can be roasted or fried.
- Carpaccio
- Casunziei
- Frittura di pesce: fried seafood served together with polenta. It is a typical dish of the coast of Adriatic Sea.
- Galletto alla brace: grilled cockerel
- Gallina alla canèvera: a dish from a very old Padua or Vicenza tradition, dating back to the Middle-Age, in which hen meat is boiled together with mixed vegetables inside a pork bladder
- Gnocchi burro, zucchero e cannella: potato gnocchi served with butter and a mix of sugar and cinnamon; sometime grated grana cheese is added.
- Gran bollito veneto (or bollito misto alla veneta): mixed boiled meats, beef, hen, beef tongue, cotechino, cooked together
- Grigliata mista: mixed grilled meats, as pork ribs, pork sausages, pork chops, chicken breasts, bacon strips, beef ribs, always served together with sliced, grilled polenta
- Maiale al latte: braised pork meat, cooked in milk
- Oca in onto: a goose marinated for some days in salt or herbs and under its own fat, and later cooked. It is a typical dish of the area of Padua.
- Pastin: a typical food from Belluno. It consists of mixed pork and beef meat, cut anyhow. Spices may be added in it, and this food is often eaten along with polenta.
- Patata americana: sweet potato; a typical fall dish, it can be served boiled or roasted.
- Polenta bianca: a variety of polenta made from white corn biancoperla, it is typical of the plain areas but above all of the territories of Padua, Venice and Treviso.
- Polenta e osei: spit roasted small game birds like larks, thrushes, house sparrows and quails, served together with polenta. Under the Republic of Venice this dish spread to eastern Lombardy territories, and in Bergamo a cake took the same name (polenta e osei).
- Porchetta trevigiana: often stuffed inside a panino
- Radicchio alla griglia: a Trevisan-based plate of grilled endive leaves
- Risotto ai fegatini: risotto made with chicken livers. It was the main dish during the wedding banquet of common people.
- Sfilacci di cavallo: frayed dried horse meat, typical of Padua and its province, it can be traditionally used to dress a bigoli dish or eaten alone, but in modern years it is popular also to dress a pizza.
- Sopressa: typical soft salami, traditionally containing garlic
- Spezzatino di musso: donkey stew, served with polenta
- Trippa alla veneta: tripe cooked with vegetables, butter and olive oil, then to be served dressed with grated grana cheese

=== Desserts ===
- Focaccia veneta (fugàssa or fugassìn in Venetian language): an Easter sweet bread
- Galani (or crostoli)
- Tiramisu: one of the most popular desserts in Italy and Europe, it is made with fresh eggs, mascarpone, Marsala and dark-coffee-dipped savoiardi (ladyfinger biscuits).

== Alcoholic beverages ==
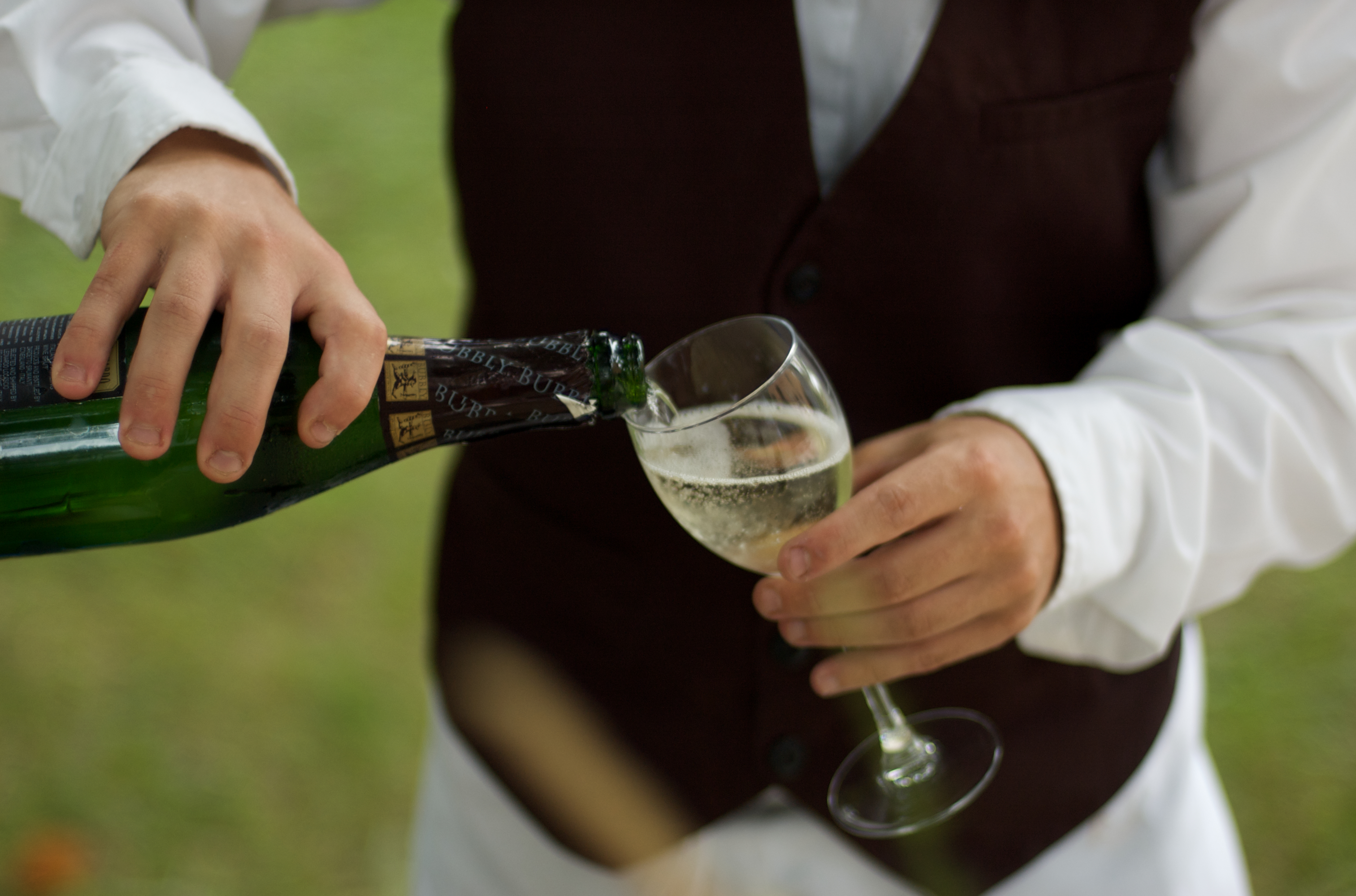
Waiter pouring Prosecco, which can be spumante (the more expensive extra fizzy) or frizzante (the cheaper fizzy)

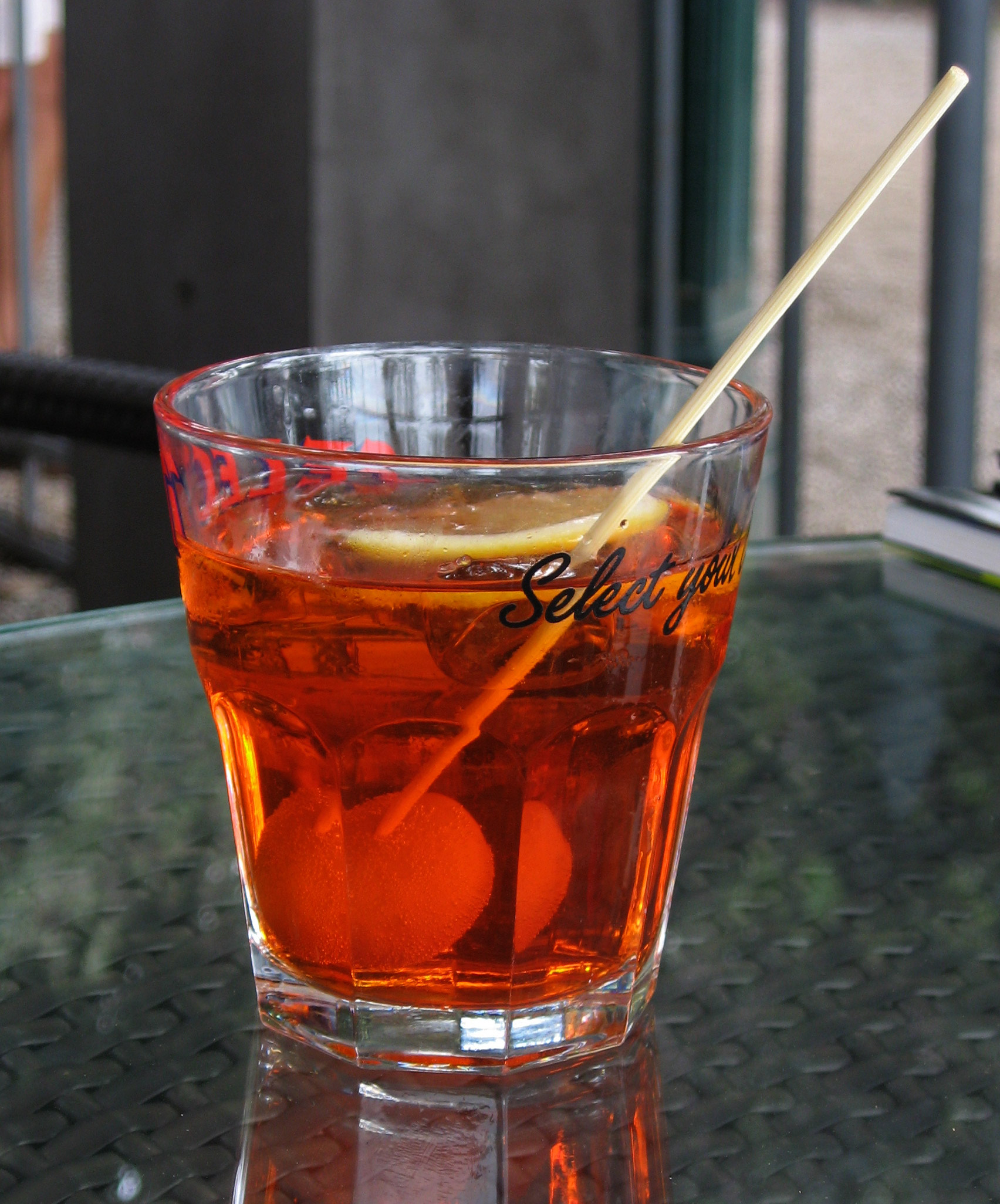
An Aperol spritz served in Venice

Venetian wine is produced in Veneto, a highly productive wine region in northeastern Italy. The broader area comprising Veneto, Friuli-Venezia Giulia and Trentino-Alto Adige/Südtirol is known collectively as the Tre Venezie, after the Republic of Venice. Veneto is the most populous and biggest denominazione di origine controllata (DOC) producer of the three regions. Although the Tre Venezie collectively produces more red wine than white, the Veneto region produces more whites under DOC and is notably home to the Prosecco and Soave wines.

The region is protected from the harsh northern European climate by the Alps, the foothills of which form Veneto's northern extremes. These cooler climes are well-suited to white varieties like Garganega (the main grape for Soave wines), while the warmer Adriatic coastal plains, river valleys, and Lake Garda zone are the places where the renowned Valpolicella, Amarone and Bardolino DOC reds are produced. Bianco di Custoza is a wine cultivated in the Custoza region, near Lake Garda.

Noteworthy is spritz, a wine-based cocktail, commonly served as an apéritif across Italy. It consists of Prosecco, a mixer (usually soda water), and a flavouring ingredient, which can be a bitter liqueur, a bitter apéritif, an amaro or a syrup. The original spritz veneziano uses the bitter apéritif Select as its flavouring ingredient and was created in Venice in 1920. Popular variants are Aperol spritz and Campari spritz, which use respectively Aperol and Campari as flavouring ingredients.

== See also ==
- Italian cuisine
- Cuisine of Abruzzo
- Apulian cuisine
- Arbëreshë cuisine
- Emilian cuisine
- Cuisine of Liguria
- Lombard cuisine
- Cuisine of Mantua
- Cuisine of Basilicata
- Neapolitan cuisine
- Piedmontese cuisine
- Roman cuisine
- Cuisine of Sardinia
- Sicilian cuisine
- Tuscan cuisine
