= Sarde in saor =

Venetian appetizer

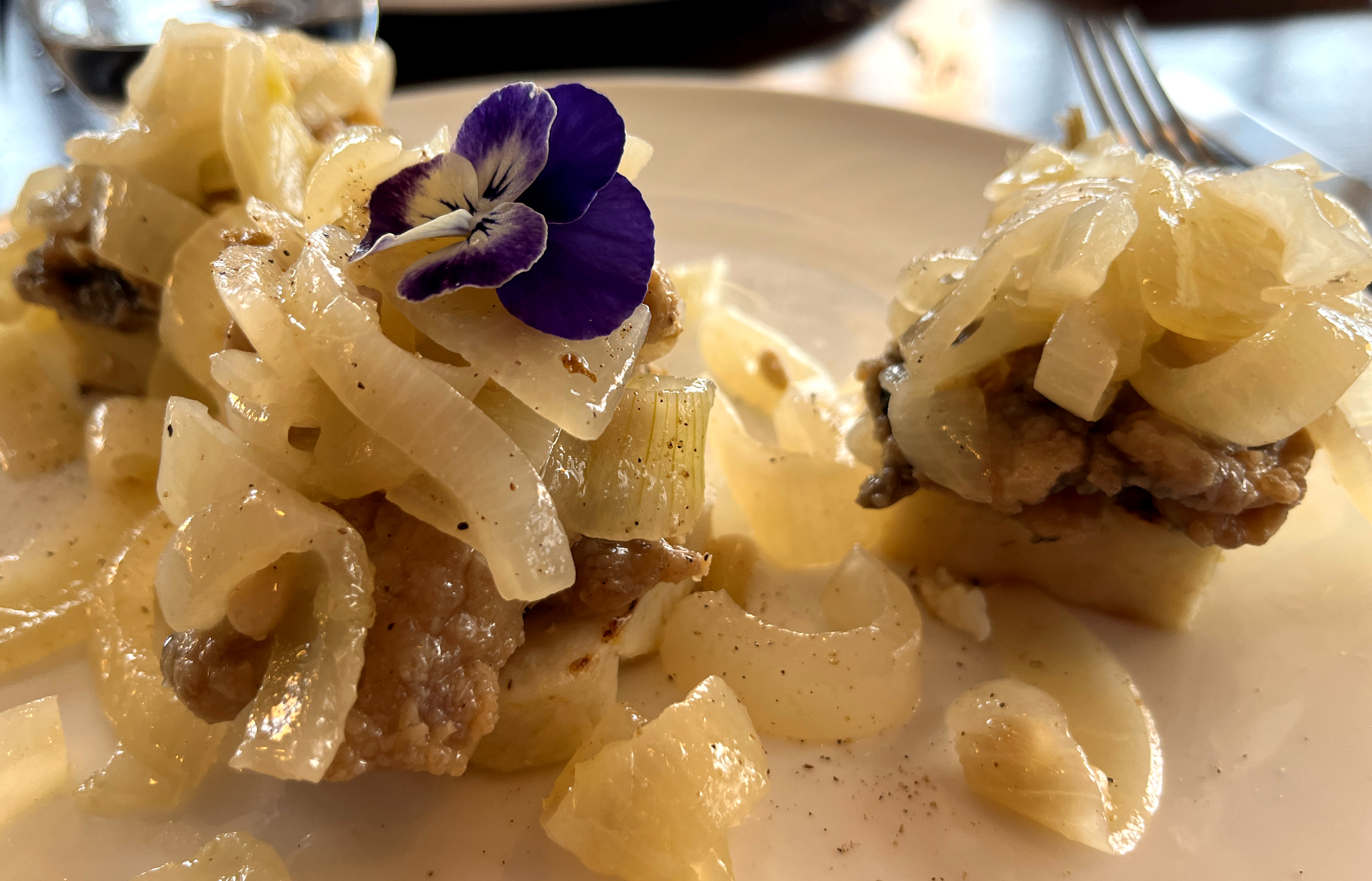
- Place of origin: Italy
- Region or state: Veneto

Sarde in saor (alternative spelling sarde in saòr) are an Italian appetizer (antipasto) consisting of fried sardines, seasoned with sweet and sour onions, pine nuts, and raisins, typical of Venetian cuisine. They are a form of cicchetti, often served as snacks in Venetian bacari.

== Etymology ==
Saor means 'flavor' in the Venetian language. In saor literally means 'in a sour sauce'.

== Origins ==
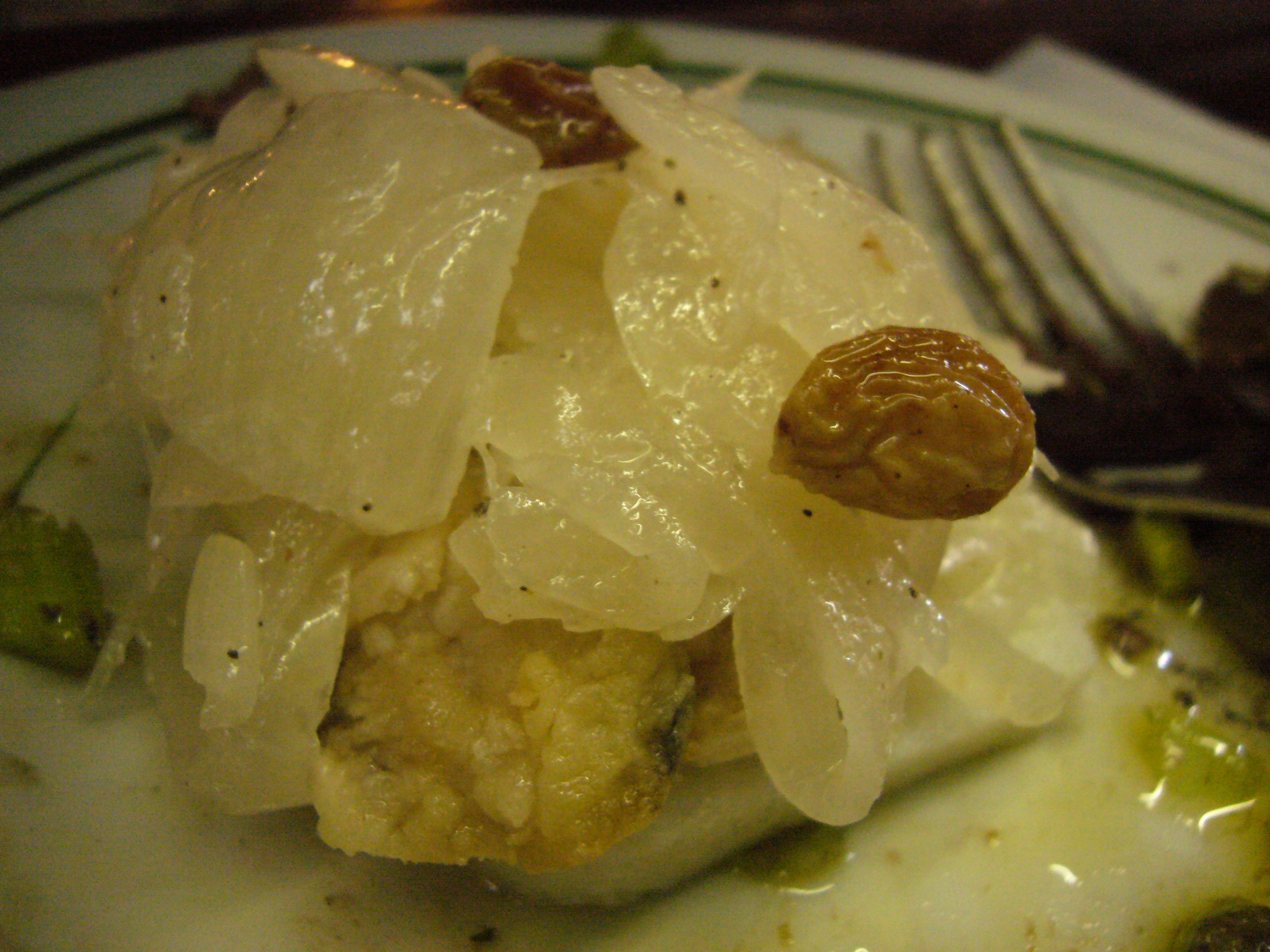
Sarde in saor

Sarde in soar was invented during the Renaissance, as a solution to keeping food fresh. Levantine and Sephardi Jews in Venice are credited with creating the dish.

Sarde in saor was invented as a method of preservation used by Venetian fishermen who had the need to keep food on board for a long time or as long as possible.

Once the onions were cooked with vinegar and olive oil, they were laid in layers interspersed with fried sardines in terracotta containers. As time passed by, the recipe acquired more refined taste tones; in fact, raisins and pine nuts were added by Renaissance people, reflecting the city's prominence on the Silk Road as a trading hub.

Since the fishermen ate the sarde in saor after a long time had passed from the moment of their preparation, they savored the taste and aroma of a product which was often no longer fresh.

For this reason, even today, when preparing sarde in saor, it is a good rule to eat them at least after one day of settling.

== See also ==
- List of fish dishes
