= Baccalà mantecato =

Venetian appetizer

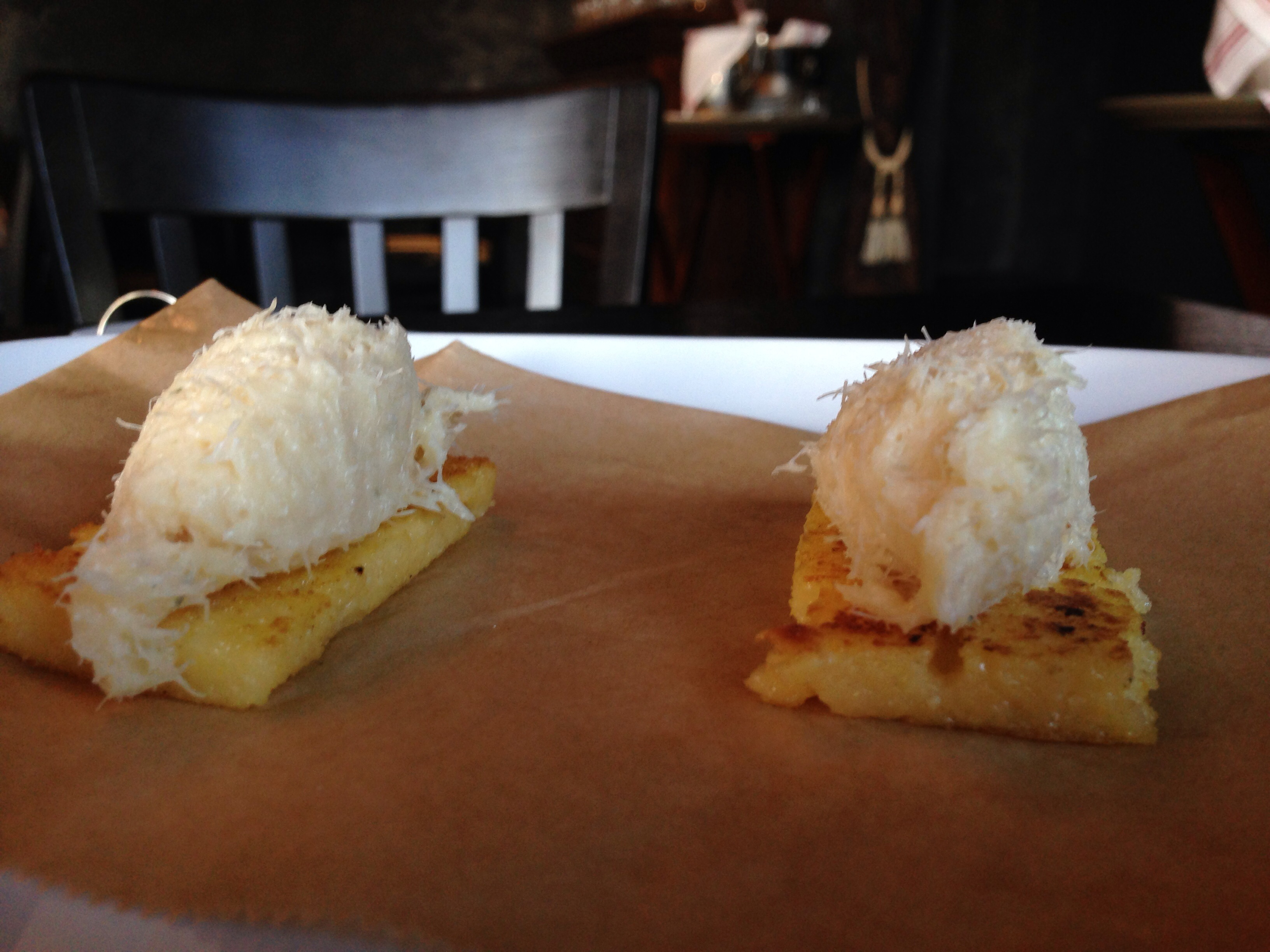
- Two cicheti with baccalà mantecato on polenta served in a bacaro in Venice, Italy
- Course: Antipasto (Italian course)
- Place of origin: Italy
- Region or state: Venice
- Main ingredients: Stockfish, garlic, olive oil

Baccalà mantecato (also spelled bacalà mantecato), meaning 'whipped salt cod spread' or 'creamed cod', is a Venetian appetizer (antipasto) made with dried cod (stockfish).

== History ==
Italian: Comunque sia, è un piatto che merita tutta la vostra attenzione perché il baccalà trattato in codesta maniera perde la sua natura triviale e diventa gentile in modo da poter figurare, come principio o tramesso, in una tavola signorile

Be that as it may, it is a dish that deserves all your attention because the codfish treated in this way loses its trivial nature and becomes gentle so that it can appear, as a beginning or a continuation, on a noble table

— Pellegrino Artusi, La Scienza in Cucina e l'Arte di mangiar bene (1895)

Baccalà mantecato was created during the 18th century in Venice. However, the use of salt cod in Venetian cuisine was first introduced in the 15th century by Pietro Querini, who was shipwrecked on the Norwegian island of Røst. Querini and his crew learned how to salt cod from local fisherman. They brought back stockfish to Venice, helping to popularize the fish.

In 2001, the city of Venice created the Brotherhood of Baccalà Mantecato to preserve and promote the dish. It is commonly served at Venetian bars and is also a dish families serve at Christmas.

== The dish and variations ==
The recipe uses stockfish, with salt cod being the most common. The simplest version of the recipe consists of the cod, garlic, olive oil, and salt and pepper. The fish is poached in water or milk with garlic. After poaching, it is deboned, if necessary. The fish is then broken up in a bowl and whipped, with olive oil, into a fluffy texture similar to mousse. Lidia Bastianich adds potato to the fish during the whipping process.

The finished spread may be topped with chopped raw garlic, parsley, white pepper, or nutmeg. Baccalà mantecato is commonly served atop sliced stirato or grilled or pan-fried polenta. One variation on the dish includes poaching with lemon and bay leaf, rather than garlic, while others poach the fish in milk and water.

== See also ==
- List of fish dishes
