= Brandade =

Dish of cod, olive oil, and potatoes

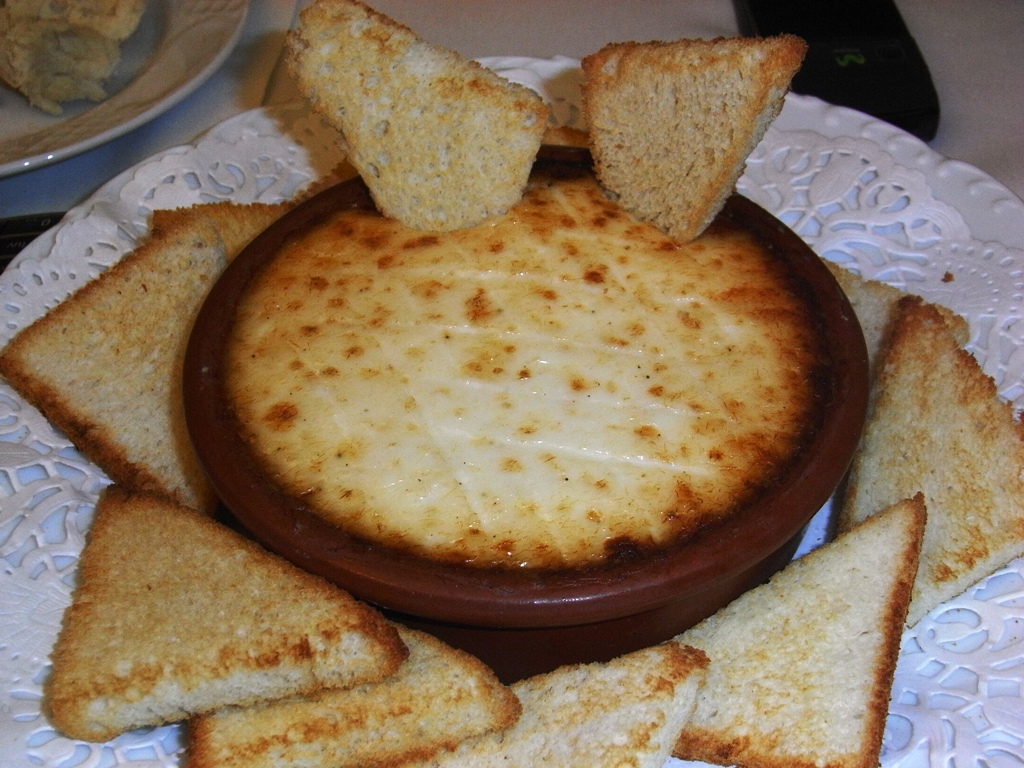
- Type: Emulsion
- Place of origin: France
- Region or state: Roussillon, Languedoc and Provence
- Main ingredients: Salt cod and olive oil
- Variations: Atascaburras
- Other information: Served with bread or potatoes

Brandade (Occitan: Brandada) is an emulsion made from salt cod, olive oil, and usually potatoes. It is eaten in the winter with bread or potatoes. In French culinary terminology, it is occasionally referred to as brandade de morue; in Spanish cuisine, it is sometimes known as brandada de bacalao ('morue' and 'bacalao' meaning 'salt cod').

Brandade is a specialty of the Roussillon, Languedoc and Provence regions of Occitanie (in present-day France) and Catalonia, the Balearic Islands and Valencia in Eastern Spain. Similar preparations are found in other Mediterranean countries such as Italy (baccalà mantecato, brandacujun), Portugal, the Greek Cyclades (brantada) and other regions of Spain (for example, atascaburras, made with salt cod, olive oil, potato and chestnut) where dried salt cod is also commonly eaten.

The word "brandada", like paella, matelote and others, has no translation into any language. In French, cod is referred to as morue, while in Occitan, it takes on the name merluça. Baron Brisse published a daily recipe for the entire world in the journal La Liberté in nineteenth-century France, and these recipes were compiled in 1868. One of them explained how to season what he called cod brandade, but in modern French it is called brandade de morue.

In Menorca (Balearic Islands, Spain), sometimes artichokes may be added. In Marseille and Toulon, crushed garlic is added to the dish. Potato is also added to brandade in France and Basque Country, but not in Catalonia. Neither cream nor milk are included in traditional recipes in Occitania or Spain.

The early versions of the recipe contained only cod and oil, but potatoes have long been added. The version with potatoes may be called brandade de morue parmentière, after Antoine-Augustin Parmentier.

== See also ==
- Ackee and saltfish
