= Bigoli =

Type of pasta

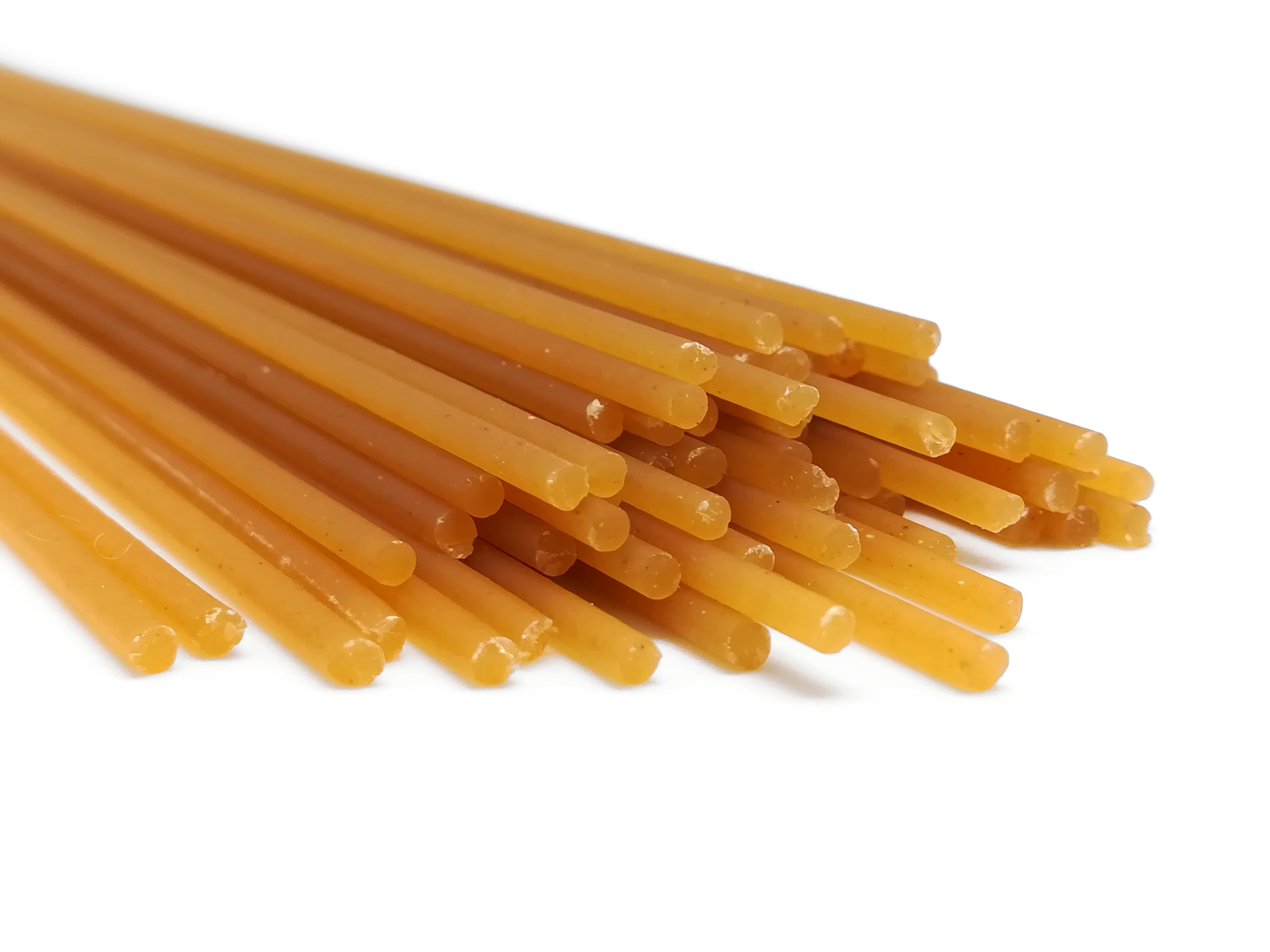
- Type: Pasta
- Place of origin: Italy
- Region or state: Veneto
- Main ingredients: Whole-wheat flour
- Variations: Pici

Bigoli (Italian: [ˈbiːɡoli]; Venetian: bìgołi) is an extruded pasta in the form of a long and thick strand. Initially bigoli were made with buckwheat flour, but are now more commonly made with whole-wheat flour, and sometimes include duck eggs. The preparation is then extruded through a bigolaro, from which the pasta gets its name.

Bigoli is a term used in Veneto; a similar type of pasta called pici is produced in Tuscany. Tuscan "pici" are similar in their elongated shape, but the preparation process is different. No press is used, instead, they are made by hand, one by one, by rolling a thin strip of dough on a cutting board or between two palms. Eggs are not used in this Tuscan recipe.

The contemporary recipe of Venetian “bigoli" involves semolina flour, whole wheat flour, and, optionally, eggs. This results in a dish that contains gluten. The use of whole wheat flour gives “bigoli" their distinctive dark color, setting them apart from typical Italian pasta made exclusively with semolina. “Bigoli” are cooked in boiling salted water for a few minutes and are then served with sauces, which can be meat-based or fish-based (typically salted sardines).

== History ==
There are different versions of the origins of the bigoli. They only agree that they originated in what is now the Veneto region. According to one theory, its origin dates back to the 14th century during the Venetian Turkish Wars. After the Turks sank numerous Venetian ships loaded with durum, the remaining flour was stretched with common wheat flour. The new mixture was used for a dough, formed into a large spaghetto and called a bigolo.

In 1604, a pasta maker from Padua named Bartolomio Veronese, known as Abbondanza (lit. 'Abundance'), patented a press for making bigoli. This was the real triumph of the bigoli.

According to another version, the bigoli are the result of a further development of a type of pasta that was already widespread in northeast Italy. They were first mentioned as bigoli in the 15th century at the court of the bishop of Eraclea.

== See also ==
Media related to Bigoli at Wikimedia Commons

- Venetian cuisine
- List of pasta
- Bigoli in salsa
