= Schlutzkrapfen =

Type of stuffed pasta

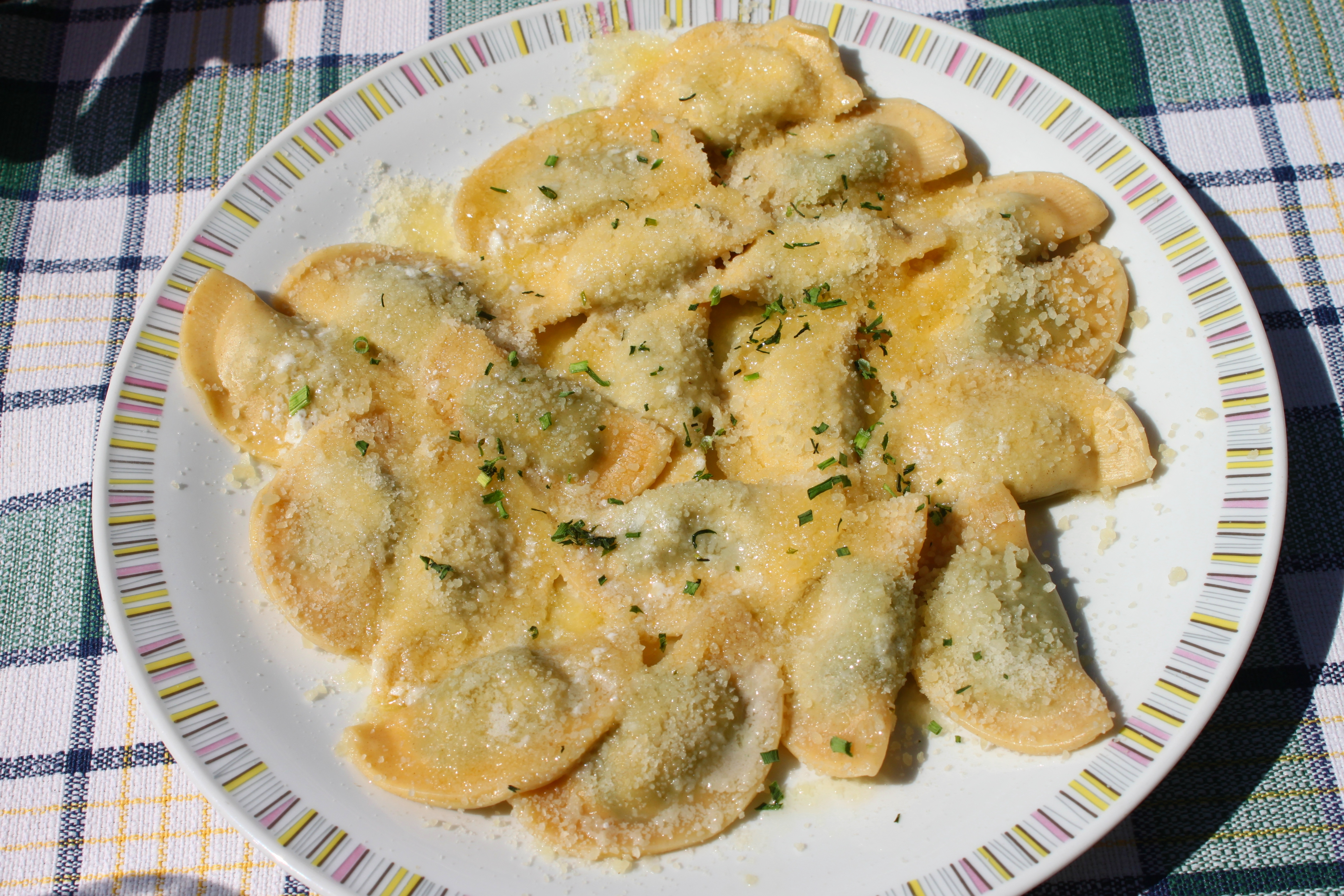
- Schlutzkrapfen with spinach and ricotta filling
- Alternative names: Schlutzkrapfen
- Type: Pasta
- Place of origin: Tyrol
- Region or state: Tyrol, Trentino-South Tyrol, Belluno
- Main ingredients: Rye flour, white flour, durum semolina, eggs, olive oil, cheese, spinach, mushrooms

Schlutzkrapfen (German: [ˈʃlʊtsˌkʁapfn̩]) is a traditional Tyrolean semi-circular stuffed pasta, similar to ravioli or pierogi. The dough is usually made of white flour and rye flour, mixed with eggs and olive oil. Typical fillings may include cheese (such as ricotta, quark, mozzarella, or Bitto), spinach, or mushrooms (such as porcini, chanterelles, or cultivated mushrooms). There are also recipes with potato, meat, red beet, or sauerkraut filling. The dish may be served with mushrooms, pesto sauce, sausage, seafood or cherry tomatoes.

== Name ==
The official name in German is Schlutzkrapfen, and they are locally also known as Schlutzer, Schlickkrapfen, Schlierkrapfen, or Schlipfkrapfen. The dish is also popular in Ladin-speaking regions, where they are known as cajincì or crafuncins depending on the region. They are usually translated into Italian as ravioli tirolesi (lit. 'Tyrolean ravioli') or mezzelune (Italian: [ˌmɛddzeˈluːne], lit. 'half moons')

== Similar dishes ==
Similar types of pasta are known as casunziei in Dolomites area, casoncelli in Lombardy, and cjarsons in Friuli-Venezia Giulia.

== See also ==
- List of pasta
- List of stuffed dishes
- List of buckwheat dishes
- Mezzaluna
