= Bigoli in salsa =

Venetian pasta dish

Bìgoli in salsa
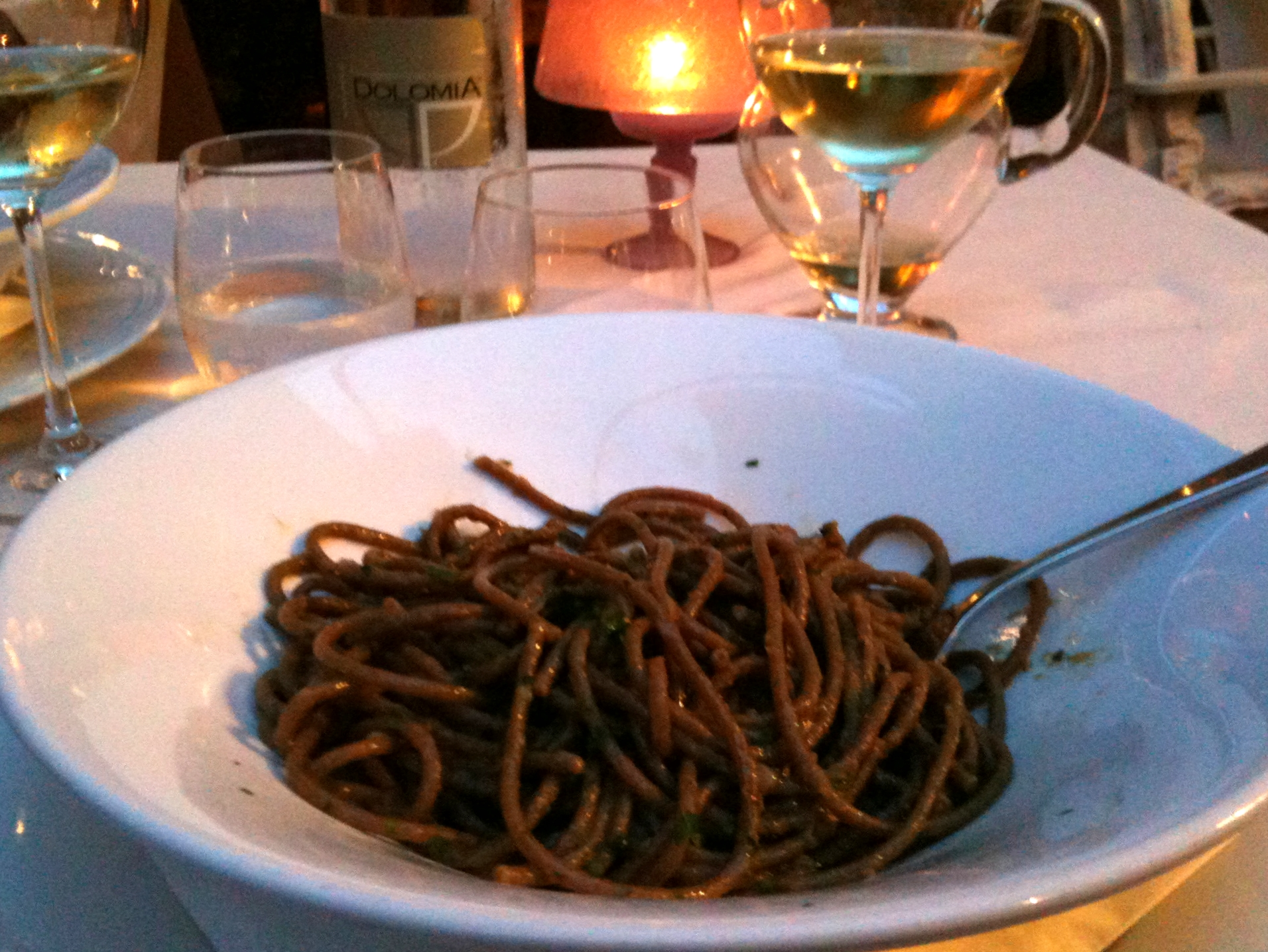
- Bigoli in salsa at a restaurant in Venice, Italy
- Course: Primo (Italian course)
- Place of origin: Italy
- Region or state: Venice, Veneto
- Main ingredients: Bigoli, anchovies, extra virgin olive oil, onion
- Variations: In the past, sardines instead of anchovies

Bigoli in salsa is a Venetian pasta dish made with whole-wheat bigoli, anchovies, extra virgin olive oil, and onion. While today anchovies are usually used, in the past it was often prepared with sardines. It is considered one of the signature dishes of Venice.

In Castel d'Ario, in the province of Mantua, the bigolada, a festival where bigoli con le sardelle are served, is held on the first day of Lent.

== See also ==
- Venetian cuisine
- List of pasta
- List of pasta dishes
