= Casoncelli =

Type of stuffed pasta

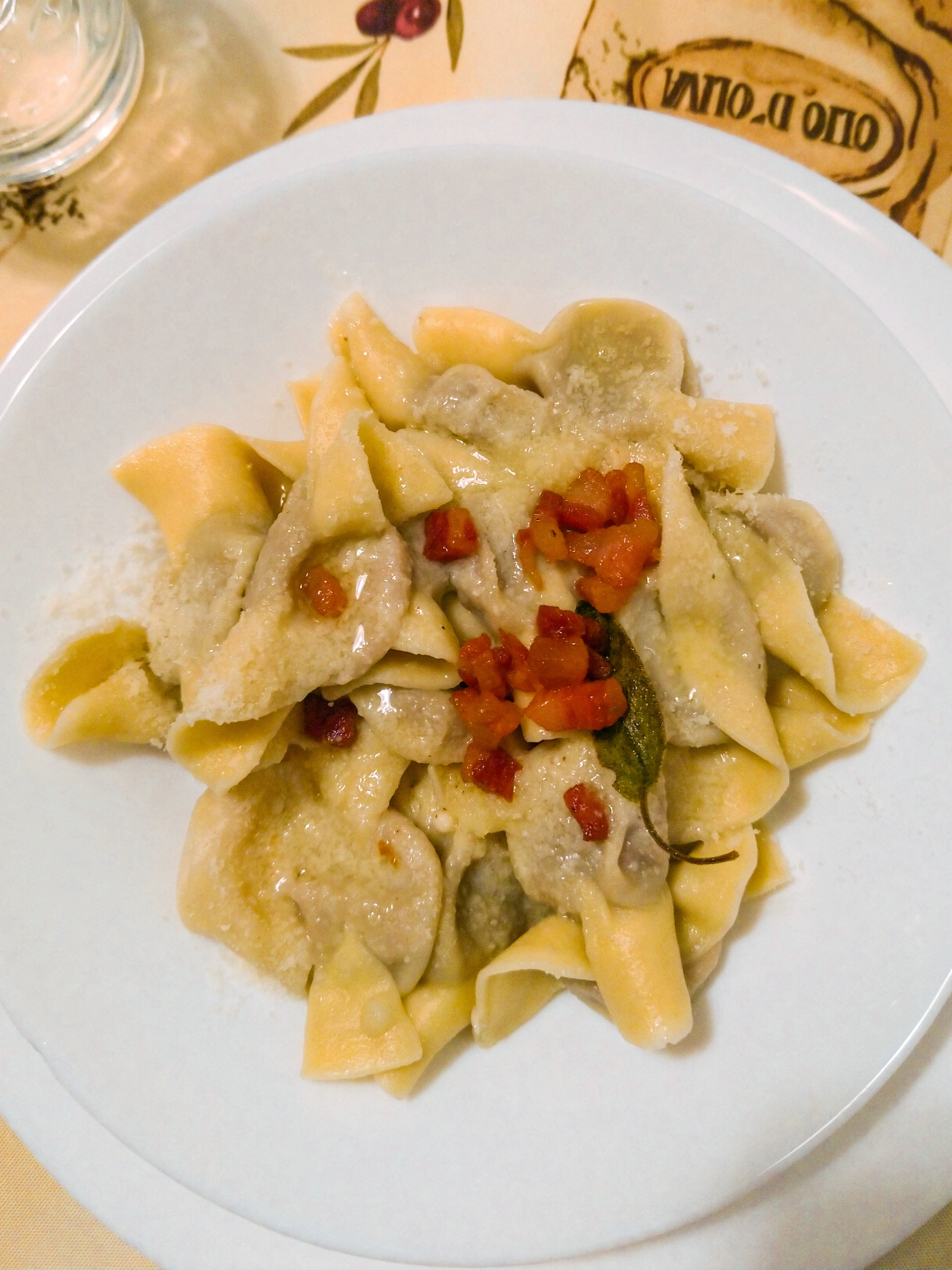
- Alternative names: Casonsèi
- Type: Pasta
- Place of origin: Italy
- Region or state: Lombardy

Casoncelli (Italian: [kazonˈtʃɛlli]; Lombard: casonsèi, Lombard: [kazonˈsɛj], in Eastern Lombard) are a type of stuffed pasta typical of the culinary tradition of Lombardy, in the north-central part of Italy.

The shell typically consists of two sheets of pasta, about 4 cm (1.6 in) long, pressed together at the edges, like that of ravioli. Alternatively it is a disk folded in two and shaped like a sweet wrapper. Casoncelli in the style alla bergamasca are typically stuffed with a mixture of breadcrumbs, eggs, Parmesan cheese, ground beef, salami or sausage. Variants of filling include spinach, raisins, amaretto biscuits, pear, and garlic; while the casoncelli alla bresciana are stuffed with a mixture of breadcrumbs, Parmesan, garlic, parsley, nutmeg and broth. They are typically served with burro e salvia: melted butter flavored with sage leaves.

== See also ==
Media related to Casoncelli at Wikimedia Commons

- List of pasta
- Casunziei – a similar stuffed pasta from northeast Italy
- Mezzelune – a similarly shaped pasta from Tyrol
