= Pearà =

Traditional Veronese sauce

- Type: Sauce
- Place of origin: Italy
- Region or state: Verona, Veneto
- Main ingredients: Breadcrumbs, stock, beef marrow, black pepper
- Ingredients generally used: Butter, extra virgin olive oil, Parmesan or Grana Padano

Pearà (Veronese dialect term; lit. 'peppered') is a traditional Veronese sauce made with breadcrumbs, beef and hen stock, beef marrow, and black pepper. It is served exclusively together with bollito misto, making lesso e pearà (lesso is Venetian for bollito), a typical dish unique to Verona and its surroundings. It should not be confused with pevarada, a sauce made with chicken livers, with which it only shares the use of pepper.
