= Casunziei =

Type of stuffed pasta

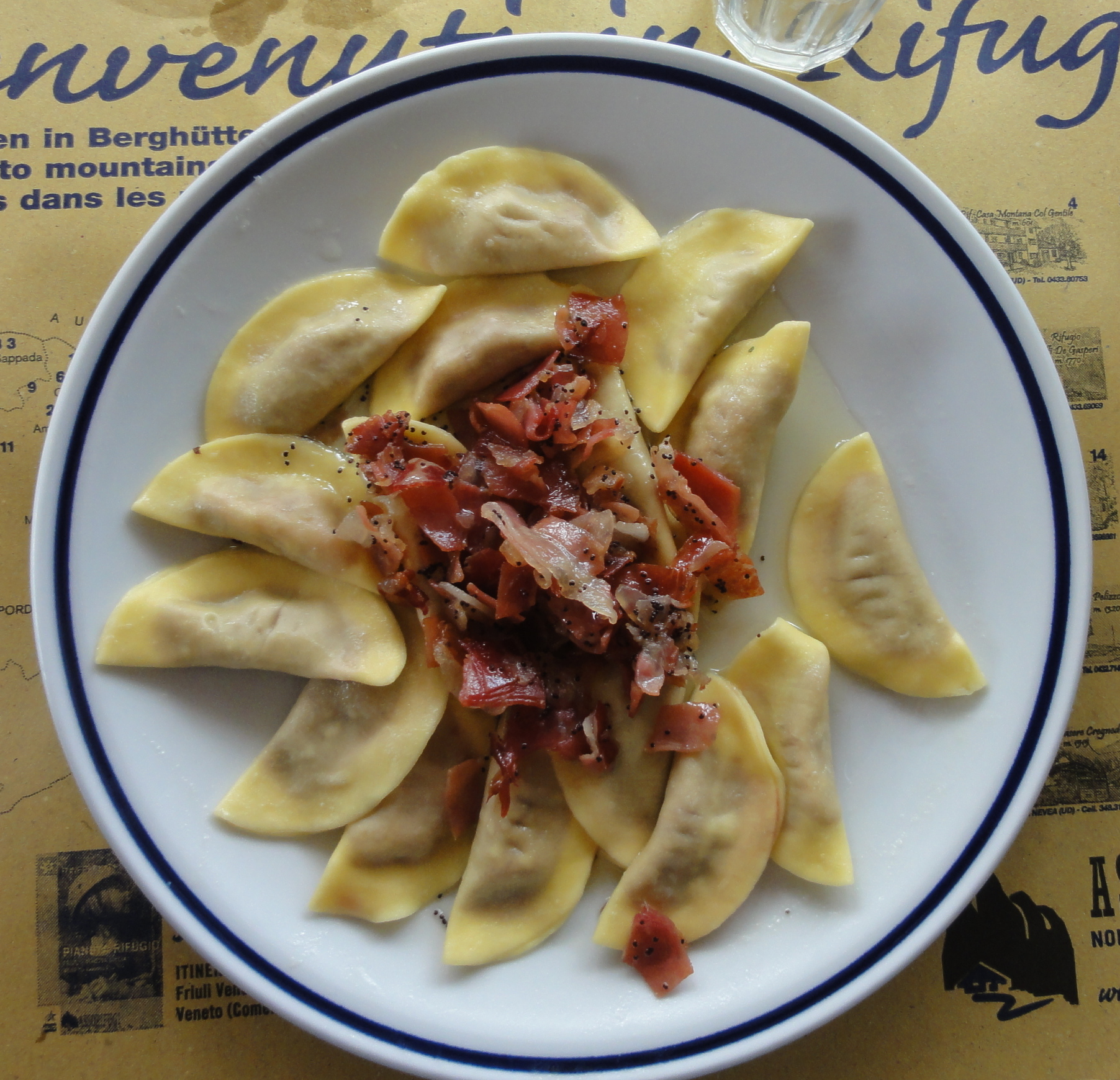
- Casunziei with red turnips
- Alternative names: Casonciei, casanzes, csanzöi
- Type: Pasta
- Place of origin: Italy
- Region or state: Veneto, Dolomites

Casunziei (also called casonciei, casanzes or csanzöi) is the name in Ladin for a type of stuffed pasta, consisting of a filling sealed between two layers of thin pasta dough, folded in a typical half-moon shape. They are commonly homemade and are typical of the culinary tradition of the Dolomites area, in the northeastern part of Italy, especially the provinces of Belluno, Bolzano, and Trento.

The square shell, typically about 3.5 by 3.5 cm, consists of two sheets of pasta pressed together at the borders, like those of ravioli.

The pre-cooked and finely ground filling varies from area to area and typically includes vegetables and ricotta cheese. The original recipes from Cortina d'Ampezzo are the "red" variety (casunziei rosc) with beet, potato, and red Veronese turnips; and the "green" one (casunziei verdes) with spinach and wild-growing erba cipollina (chives) in the filling. Other varieties have fillings of pumpkin or radishes. The filling may include other ingredients such as ham, mushrooms, other types of cheese, or poppy seeds. In particular, the casunziei all'ampezzana have a filling of red and yellow turnips and are typically served with melted butter, poppy seeds, and Parmesan cheese. Other servings are sage-flavored melted butter, or a radish-based sauce.

At Cencenighe Agordino, casunziei served with ground poppy seeds and honey were a traditional Christmas Eve dish.

== See also ==
Media related to Casunziei at Wikimedia Commons

- List of pasta
- Casoncelli or casonsèi – a similar filled pasta from Lombardy
- Mezzelune – a similarly shaped pasta from Tyrol
