= Bacaro =

Typical Venetian osteria

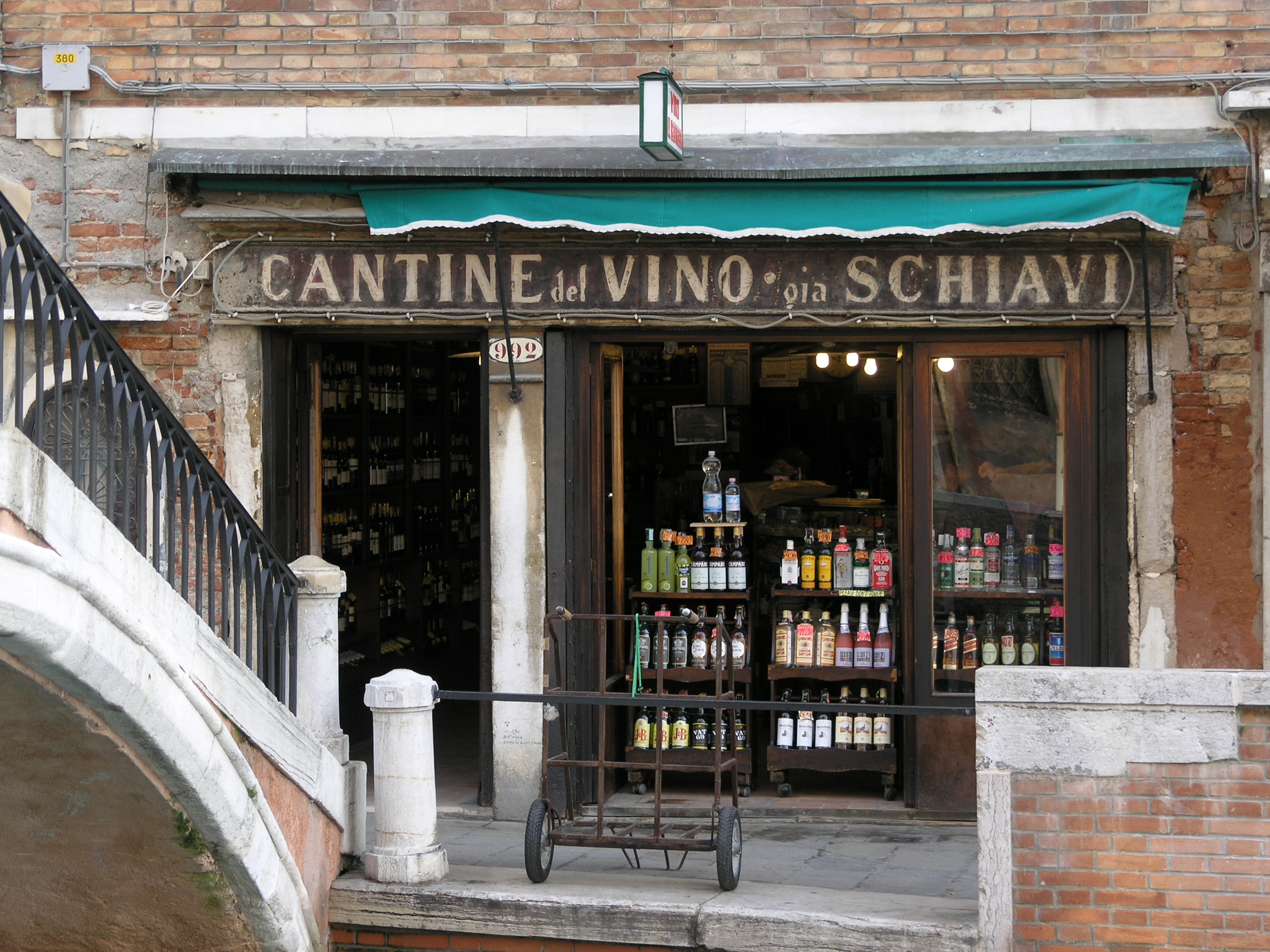
A bacaro in Venice, in the Dorsoduro sestiere

A bacaro (pron. bàcaro) is a type of Venetian osteria, usually simply furnished and sometimes standing-room only. Bacari serve wine in small glasses, ombre (lit. 'shadows'), accompanied by cicchetti, food offerings typically displayed on and served from a counter.

According to food writer Dana Bowen, cicchetti served in a bacaro tend to reflect the neighborhood; around the Rialto Bridge, simple traditional snacks to provide a quick meal for local workers, and in residential neighborhoods trendier or upscale versions. Often the offerings are seasonal and may change as the day wears on.
