= Baicoli =

Italian biscuit, originating in Venice

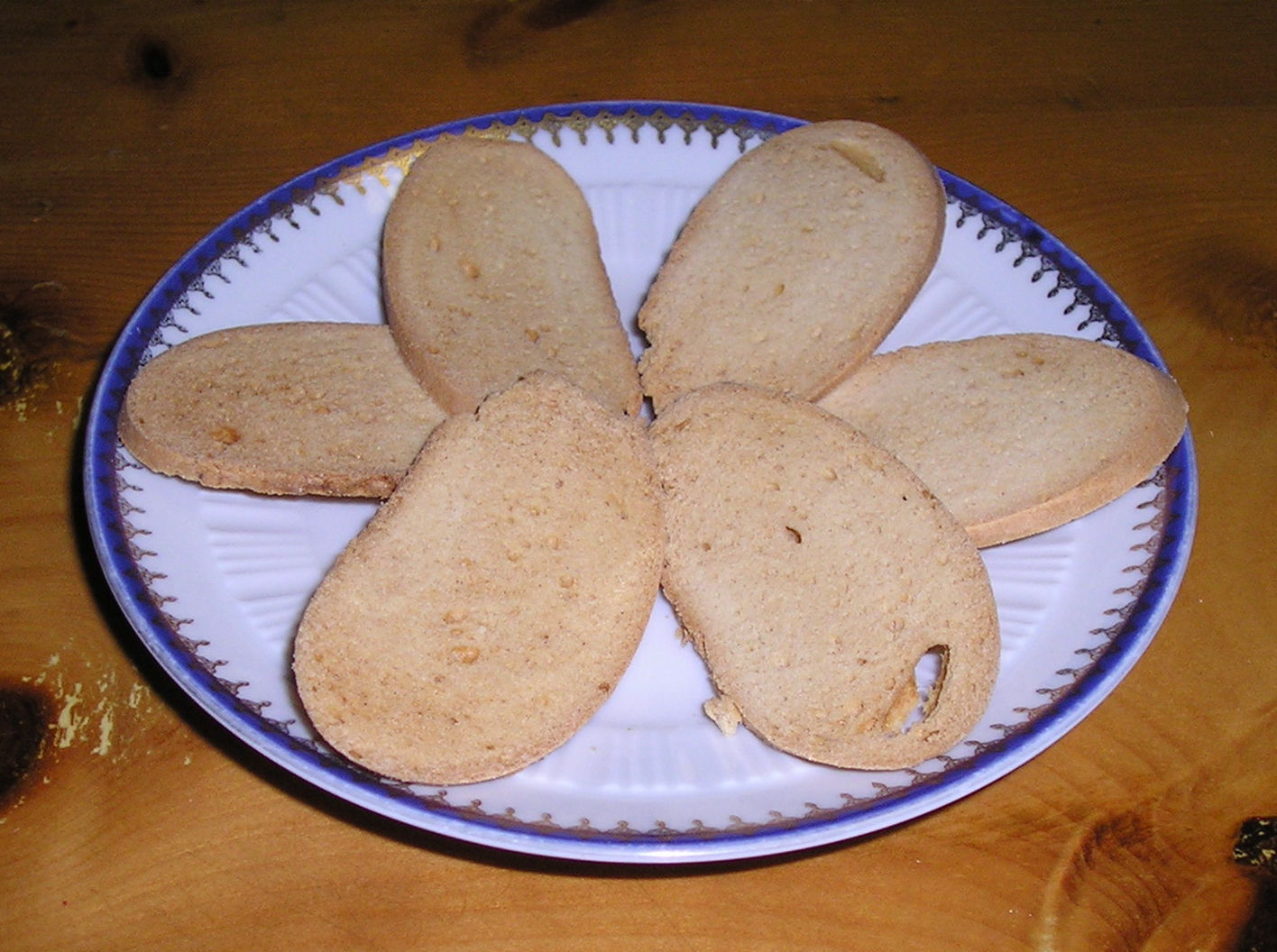
- Type: Biscuit
- Place of origin: Italy
- Region or state: Venice, Veneto
- Main ingredients: Flour, butter, sugar, eggs, yeast, salt

Baicoli (Venetian: baìcołi) are Italian biscuits, originating in the 1700s in the city of Venice. They are made with sugar, butter, flour, yeast, eggs, and salt.

Baicoli gained their name because their shape resembled that of small mullets, which in the local dialect are called baicoli.

The biscuits have a long shelf life and were used as a ship's biscuit for long sea voyages. Their preparation, which is long and laborious, has two acts of leavening and double baking.

Today, baicoli are commonly served with coffee and zabaglione, in which they can be dipped.

== See also ==
- List of Italian desserts and pastries
