= Asiago cheese =

Italian medium-soft to hard Alpine cheese

Asiago
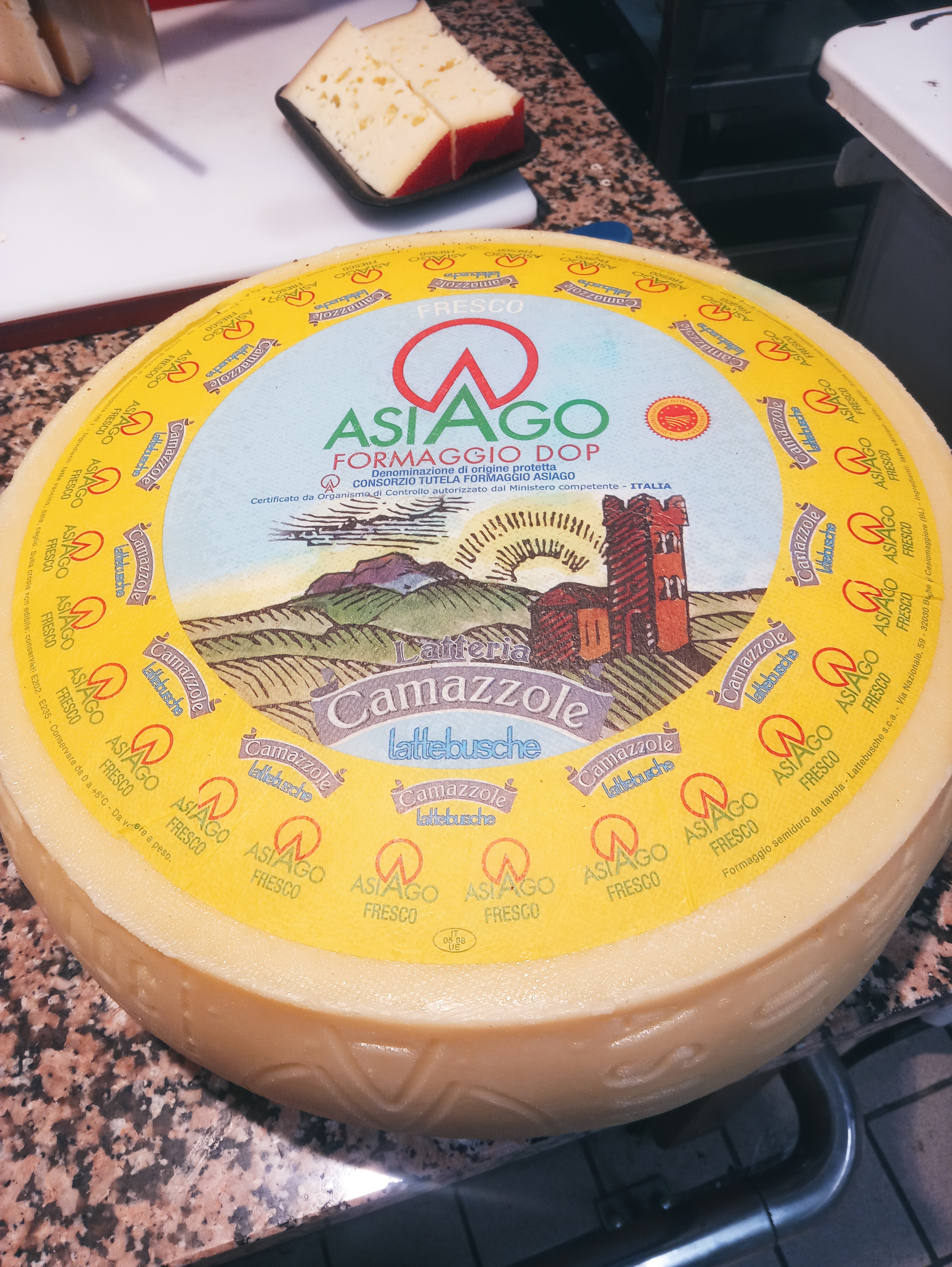
- Other names: Asiago pressato, Asiago d'allevo
- Country of origin: Italy
- Region: Veneto; Trentino
- Town: Asiago
- Source of milk: Cows
- Pasteurized: No
- Texture: Medium-soft to hard, depending on age
- Certification: PDO 1996

Asiago (UK: /ˌæsiˈɑːɡoʊ, ˌæzi-/ ASS-ee-AH-goh, AZ-, US: /ˌɑːsi-, ˌɑːʒi-, ˌɑːʃi-/ AH-s(h)ee-, AH-zhee-, Italian: [aˈzjaːɡo]) is a cow's milk cheese, first produced in Asiago in Italy, that can assume different textures according to its aging, from smooth for the fresh Asiago (called Asiago pressato, which means "pressed Asiago") to a crumbly texture for the aged cheese (Asiago d'allevo, which means "breeding farm Asiago"). The aged cheese is often grated in salads, soups, pastas, and sauces while the fresh Asiago is sliced to prepare panini or sandwiches; it can also be melted on a variety of dishes and cantaloupe. It is classified as a Swiss-type or Alpine cheese.

Asiago is produced in multiple countries around the world including Italy, the United States, and Australia.

In Italy, Asiago has a protected designation of origin (denominazione di origine protetta or DOP, see below), as Asiago was originally produced around the alpine area of the Asiago plateau, in the regions of Veneto and Trentino-Alto Adige. Asiago cheese is one of the most typical products of the Veneto region. It was, and still is, the most popular cheese in the DOP area where it is produced. The DOP production area is strictly defined: It starts from the meadows of the Po Valley and finishes in the Alpine pastures between the Asiago plateau and the Trentino's highlands. The DOP designated area where the milk is collected and Asiago DOP cheese is produced extends to four provinces in the north-east of Italy: the entire area of Vicenza and Trento and part of the provinces of Padua and Treviso. Asiago cheese which is produced and matured in dairies located more than 600 m (2,000 ft) above sea level, using milk from farms also more than 600 m (2,000 ft) above sea level, is entitled to the additional label "Product of the Mountains".

Over time, production of asiago was initiated in other countries as well, particularly those with a history of notable immigration from Italy. As such, production of the cheese has spread around the globe and the term "asiago" describes a style of cheese that can be produced anywhere.

== History ==
Between the 10th and 15th centuries, sheep raising was the predominant agricultural activity in the Asiago plateau – which was known for its pastures – the purpose of which was the production of savory cheeses (originally called "Pegorin"), and wool production, destined for the textile works of the near valley (Valdagno, Schio, Piovene Rocchette). In the 1700s Asiago production was expanded to surrounding areas; by the 18th and 19th centuries during long maturation Asiago d'Allevo was produced. It wasn't until the early 1900s that the shorter maturation Asiago Pressato was produced.

Bartolomeo Platina wrote "goat's milk is excellent, ewe's milk is next, with cow's milk is in third place".

Asiago was introduced into the United States by Italian immigrants in the 1920s and became well known in the late 20th and early 21st centuries for its use in shredded cheese blends and as a topping on the eponymous "asiago bagel".

== Varieties and production ==
=== Pressed Asiago ===
This type is produced by using fresh whole milk. The first step is heating milk at 35 °C (95 °F). Specific enzymes, like rennet and lipase, are then added as liquid solution and the milk starts to coagulate. The curd is kneaded and partially cooked. The curd is broken into many little pieces (of the size of a nut), whereupon the curd is cooked again at approximately 45 °C (113 °F). Later, this mixture is poured into molds with perforated walls; afterwards there is a first dry salting and then the mold is squeezed with a press, usually hydraulic, for about four hours. Then the rounds are wrapped laterally with plastic bands (which put the brand Asiago around the entire form) and are placed in a room called "Frescura" for two to three days to dry. At this point the bands are removed to allow one last curing by a bath in brine for a period of two days. Then the forms are allowed to rest in a dry environment for a period ranging from 20 to 40 days. The finished cheese has a cylindrical shape with a diameter of 30–40 cm (12–16 in) and height about 15 cm (5.9 in). The average weight of a wheel is 11–15 kg (24–33 lb). The rind is thin and elastic; the paste inside is soft, buttery, white or slightly yellowish.

=== Asiago d'Allevo ===
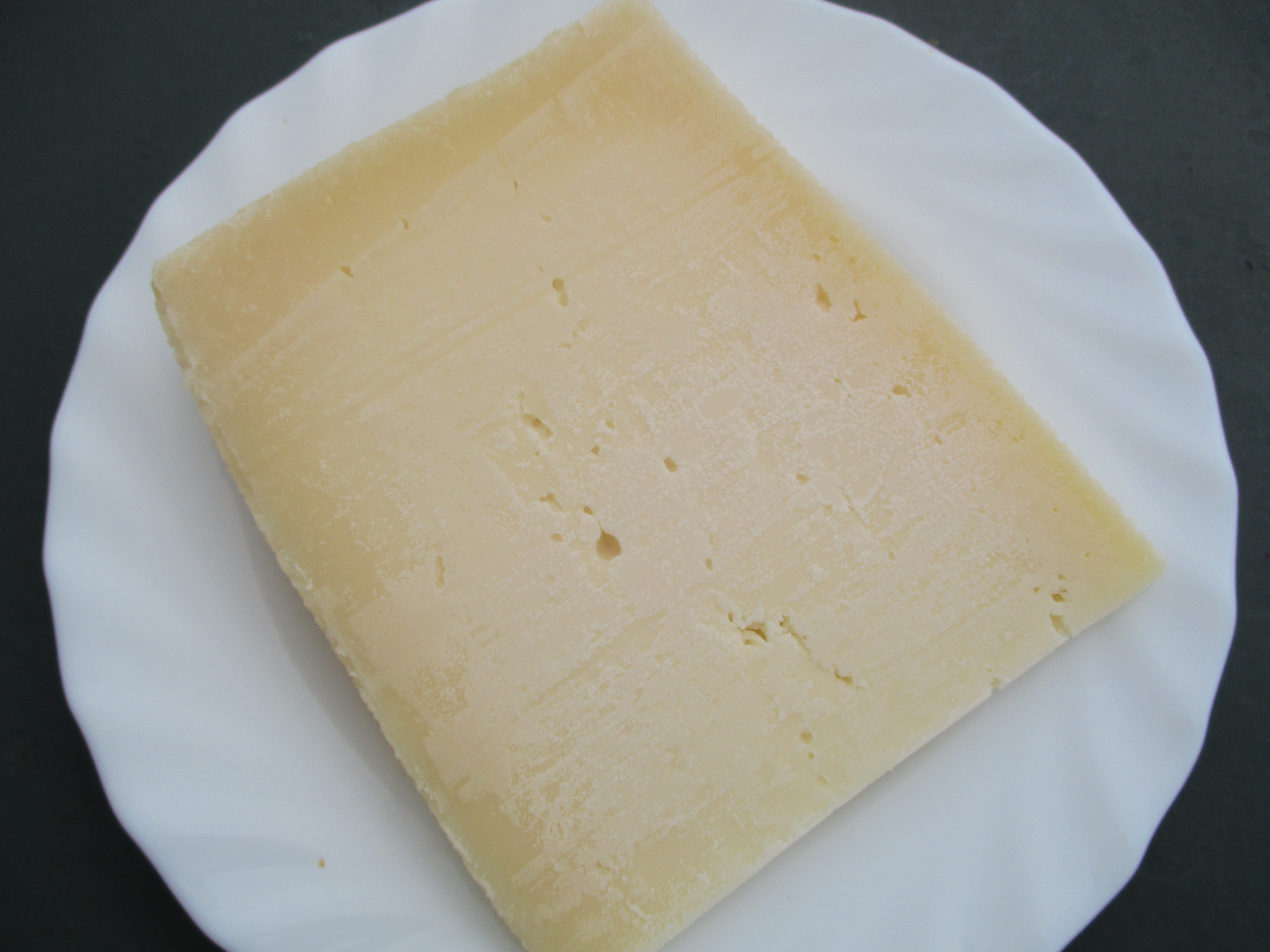
Asiago d'Allevo

This type is produced by using a mixture of whole milk and skimmed milk. First the raw milk is heated to about 35 °C (95 °F) and rennet and enzymes are added as a liquid solution to make it coagulate. The batter obtained is then kneaded and partially cooked; the curd is broken into many small parts (of the size of a grain of rice). At this stage there are two other firings: to 40 and 47 °C (104 and 117 °F). The paste is removed from the heat and stirred with a large whisk, then the curd is extracted and placed into molds lined with cheese cloth for forming. It is divided up and left to rest for a couple of hours on a draining table and then the cheese is turned several times. Next, in the pre-salting stage, the last whey is removed and the DOP logo is impressed onto the side. This process takes a couple of days (at least 48 hours) and during this time the wheels are turned several times. The cheese is then salted in one of two ways, either by spreading salt over the surface of the cheese or by soaking it in brine. The last step is the ageing process, which lasts at least 60 days and must take place within the area of origin, and is done in warehouses where the storage temperature and relative humidity are meticulously controlled (optimal values are 10–15 °C (50–59 °F) and 80-85%).

According to the duration of ageing, Asiago d'Allevo is classified as follows:

- Asiago Mezzano (middle Asiago): 4 to 6 months of aging; compact paste, straw-colored and sweetish taste.
- Asiago Vecchio (old Asiago): 10 to 16 months of aging; hard paste, straw-colored and bitter taste.
- Asiago Stravecchio (very old Asiago): 15 or more months of aging; very hard and grainy paste, amber-colored with a bitter and spicy taste.

=== Protected designation of origin ===
Within the EU, Asiago cheese is an Italian D.O.P. product (Denominazione di Origine Protetta), equivalent to a Protected Designation of Origin (PDO). This simply means that the product can be considered as "authentic" by European law if and only if it is produced in its specific origin area, and according to a specific regime, known as the Disciplinare di produzione. The EU law does not apply outside the European Union. Previously it had enjoyed protected status in a number of European countries with which Italy had bilateral agreements under the Denominazione d’Origine awarded by the presidential decree of 21 December 1978 and subsequently modified by the prime-ministerial decree of 3 August 1993 and by the ministerial decree of 6 June 1995, under which the current Disciplinare came into force.

=== Generic nature of Asiago ===
The U.S. Patent and Trademark Office has ruled clearly and repeatedly that asiago is a generic term, citing widespread use of the term by multiple companies to describe a type of cheese, not a unique product produced solely in Italy. In 2019, the Consorzio Tutela Formaggio Asiago abandoned efforts to trademark "asiago" in the United States following the U.S. Patent and Trademark Office's rejection of a trademark application on the grounds that "asiago" is a generic term. Similar efforts to trademark the term "asiago" have been struck down by IP Australia in 2018.

== See also ==
- List of Italian cheeses
