= Cicchetti =

Small snacks or side dishes in Venetian cuisine

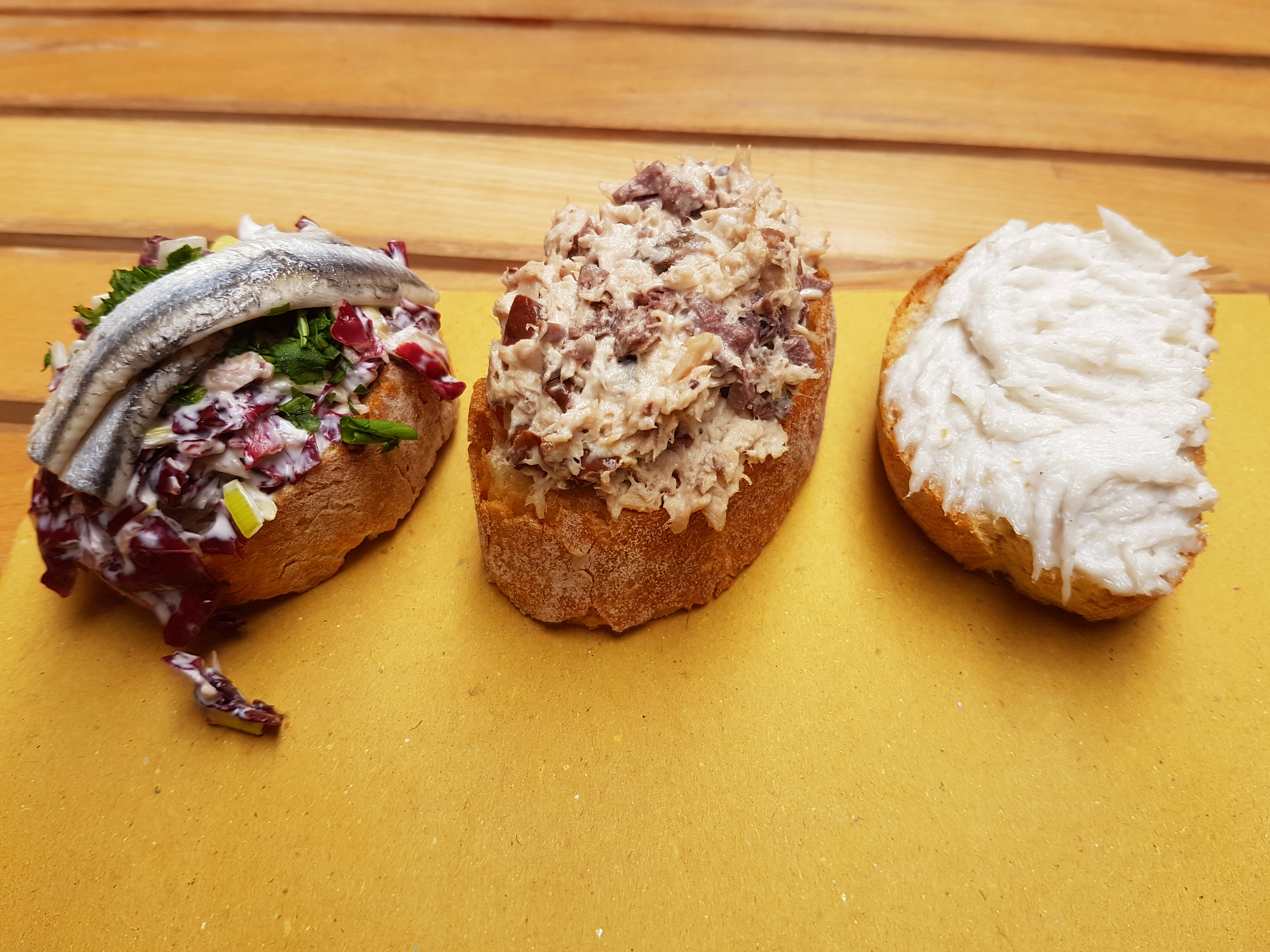
Bar food in Venice, Italy

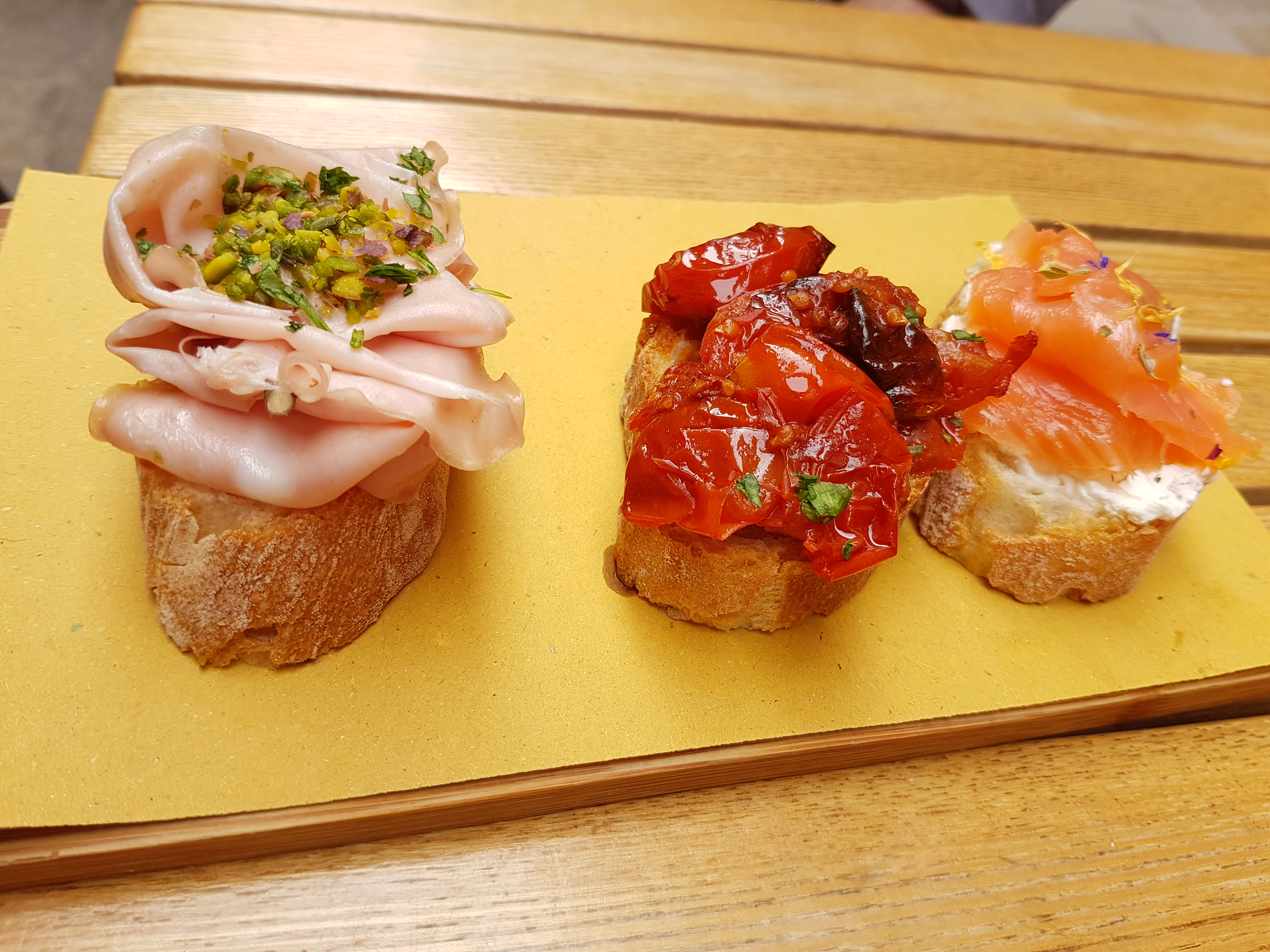
A row of cicchetti topped with mortadella, dried tomatoes and smoked salmon respectively

Cicchetti (Italian: [tʃikˈketti]; sg.: cicchetto; Venetian: cicheti, sg.: cicheto; from the Latin ciccus, meaning 'small quantity'), also sometimes spelled cichetti, are small snacks or side dishes, typically served in traditional bacari (sg.: bacaro; i.e. cicchetti bars or osterie) in Venice, Italy. Common cicchetti include tiny tramezzini, plates of olives or other vegetables, halved hard-boiled eggs, small servings of a combination of one or more of seafood, meat and vegetable ingredients laid on top of a slice of bread or polenta, and very small servings of typical full-course plates. Like Spanish tapas, one can also make a meal of cicchetti by ordering multiple plates. Normally not a part of home cooking, the cicchetti's importance lies not just in the food itself, but also in how, when and where they are eaten: with fingers and toothpicks, usually standing up, hanging around the counter where they are displayed in numerous bars, osterie and bacari that offer them virtually all day long. Venice's many cicchetti bars are quite active during the day, as Venetians (and tourists) typically eat cicchetti in the late morning, for lunch, or as afternoon snacks.

Cicchetti are usually accompanied by a small glass of local white wine, which the locals refer to as an ombra (lit. 'shadow'). The term is a remnant of the period in which wines were unloaded in the Riva degli Schiavoni and then sold in shaded stands located at the base of the Bell Tower of Saint Mark's Basilica; as the sun changed position, the stands were moved so they could continue to stay in the shade.

== See also ==
- Tapas
