= Ziti =

Type of pasta

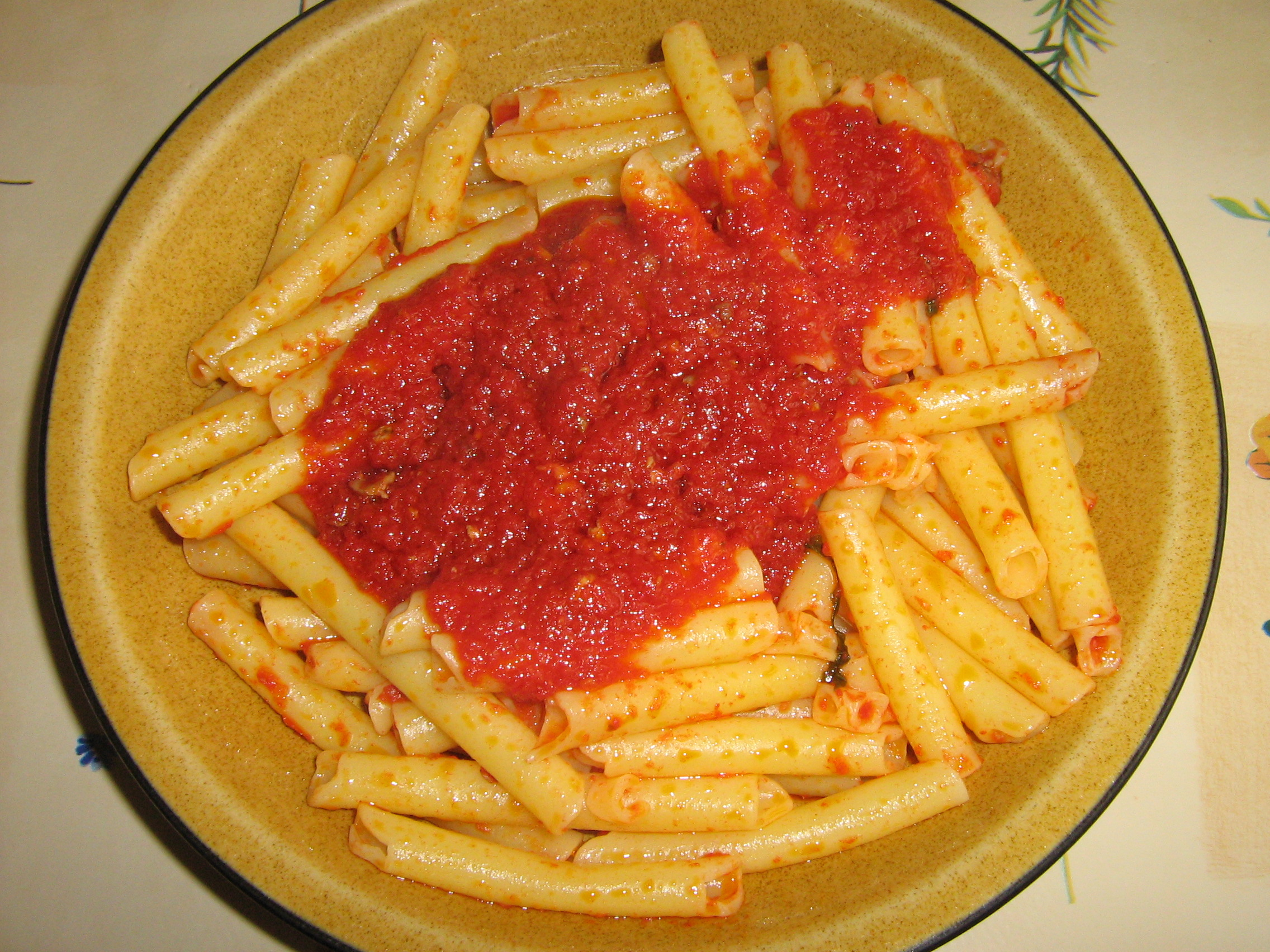
- Served with Neapolitan ragù
- Alternative names: Busiata, maccheroni di zita, a pasta d'à festa (Molise), stivalette (Apulia)
- Type: Pasta
- Place of origin: Italy
- Region or state: Sicily
- Main ingredients: Durum wheat flour, water
- Variations: Zitoni, zitoni rigati

Ziti (Italian: [ˈdziːti]) or zite (Italian: [ˈdziːte]) is a shape of extruded pasta originating in the Italian region of Sicily.

Factories make ziti out of durum wheat flour and water, forming long, narrow tubes. In baked macaroni dishes, these tubes are used unbroken, but for preparations serving ziti with sauce, they are broken or cut into pieces around 5 centimetres (2 in) long. In the past, this was generally done by cooks before cooking, but is today more frequently performed by manufacturers, who sell the pieces under the name "cut ziti". These cuts are made straight across, rather than diagonally as is the case with penne. Like penne lisce, plain ziti has a smooth surface, making thin sauces less appropriate for this dish. Variations of ziti include zitoni, a thicker pasta, and zitoni rigati, which, like rigatoni and penne rigate, does have ridges on its surface.

Ziti is known under the alternative names busiata and maccheroni di zita, as well as a pasta d'à festa and stivalette in Molise and Apulia respectively. The phrase "box of ziti" has become a colloquial euphemism for $1,000 in New York, after its use was popularized in the crime-drama series The Sopranos. The literal translation of ziti is either 'brides' or 'grooms'; in the past in Sicily, ziti was a mainstay at the weddings of all economic classes, served with stewed pork. The name maccheroni di zita similarly references weddings, meaning "bridal macaroni". Today, ziti is eaten throughout Italy, in several regions during feasts. An example of this is in Molise, where it is popularly believed that by eating ziti on the Feast of the Epiphany, the devil will not appear at one's deathbed.

The pasta is often served with Genovese sauce or ragù, as well as in baked pasta dishes. In Apulia, ziti is used in pasta seduta (lit. 'seated pasta'). In this dish, a bowl of ziti, covered with tomato sauce, meatballs and cheese, is covered and immersed in boiling water. Baked ziti is a pasta al forno (baked pasta casserole) characteristic of Italian-American cuisine, made of ziti, bechamel, ragù, and topped with cheese. The version eaten in Naples, ziti alla sorrentina, is less dense than the baked ziti popular in America.

== Gallery ==
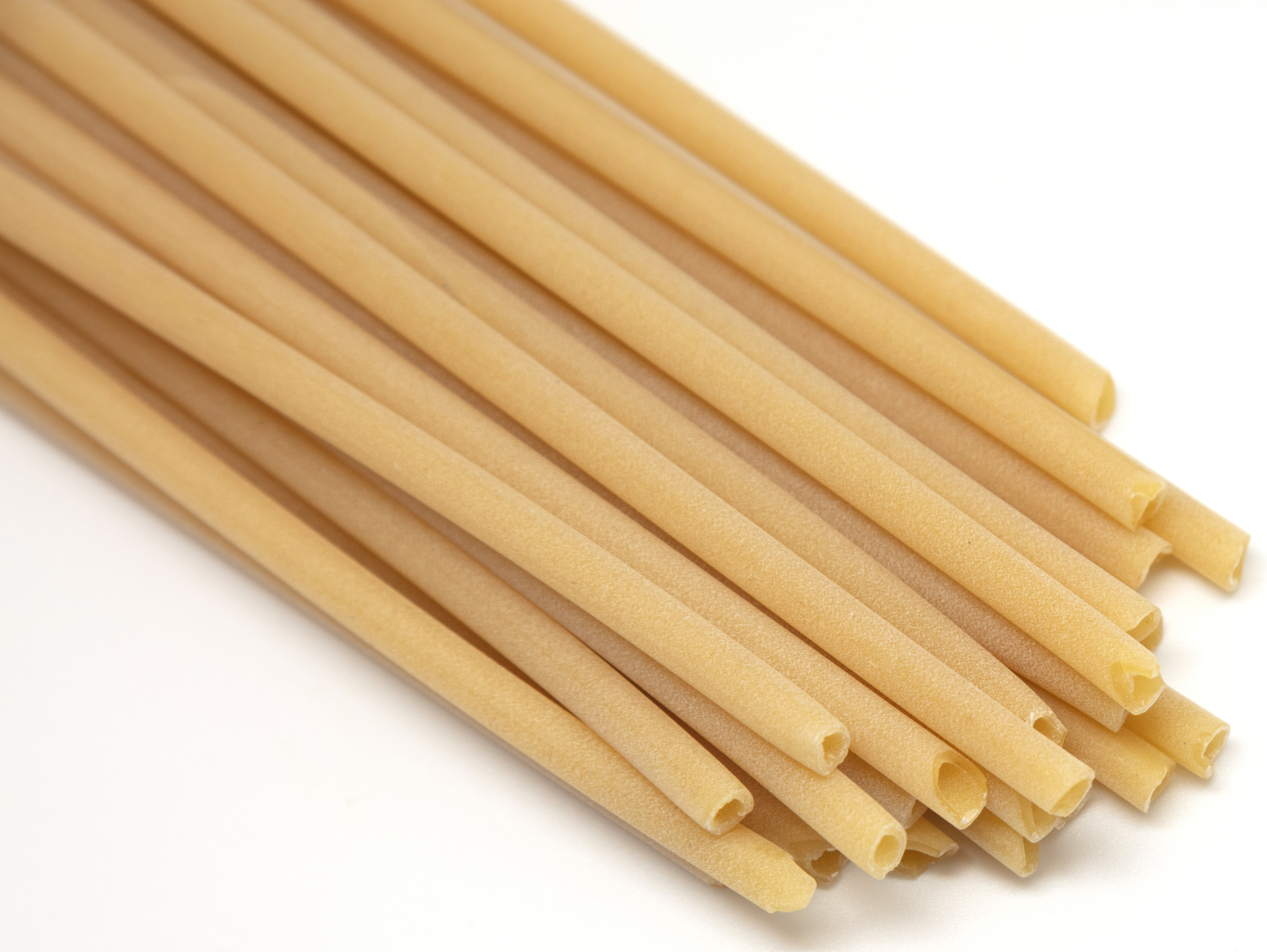
Uncut ziti

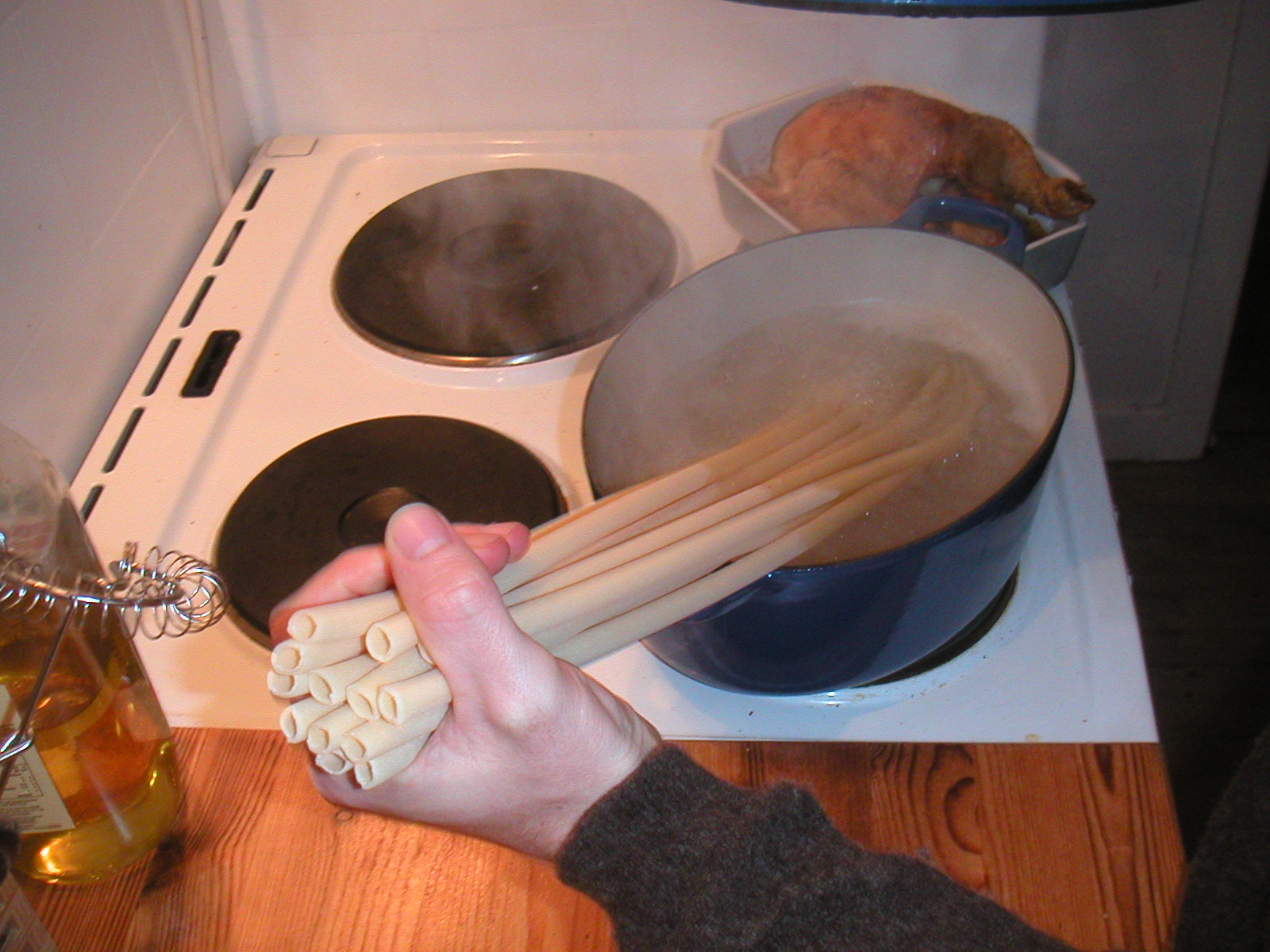
Uncut ziti being set into a pot

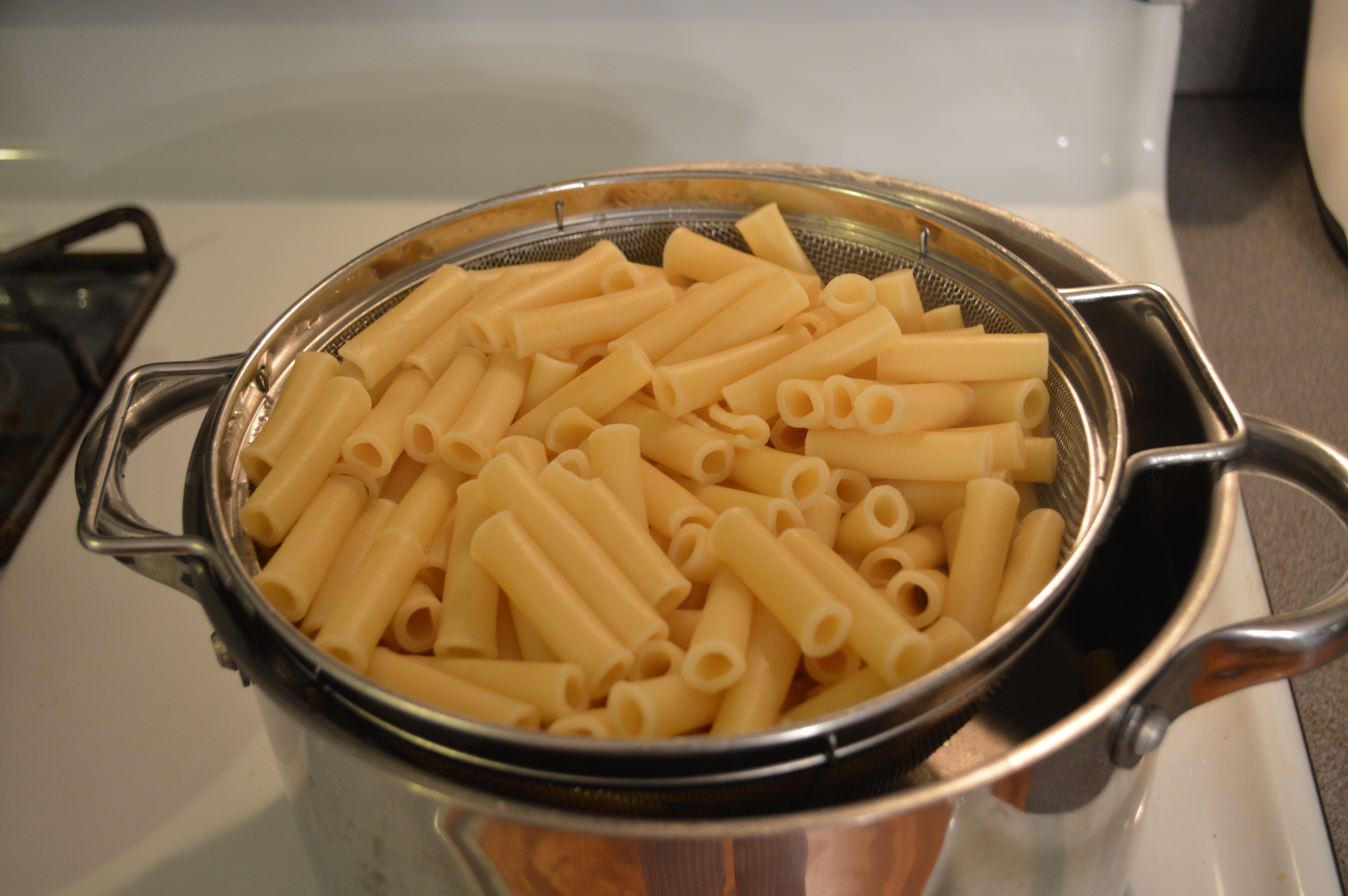
Cut ziti in a strainer

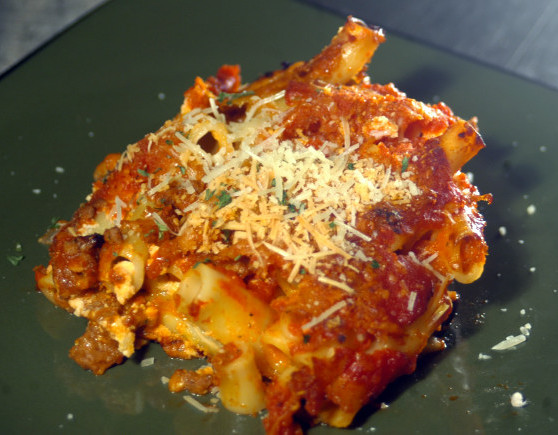
Baked ziti with tomato sauce and cheese

== See also ==
Media related to Ziti at Wikimedia Commons

- List of pasta
- List of casserole dishes
