= Al forno =

Food that has been baked in an oven

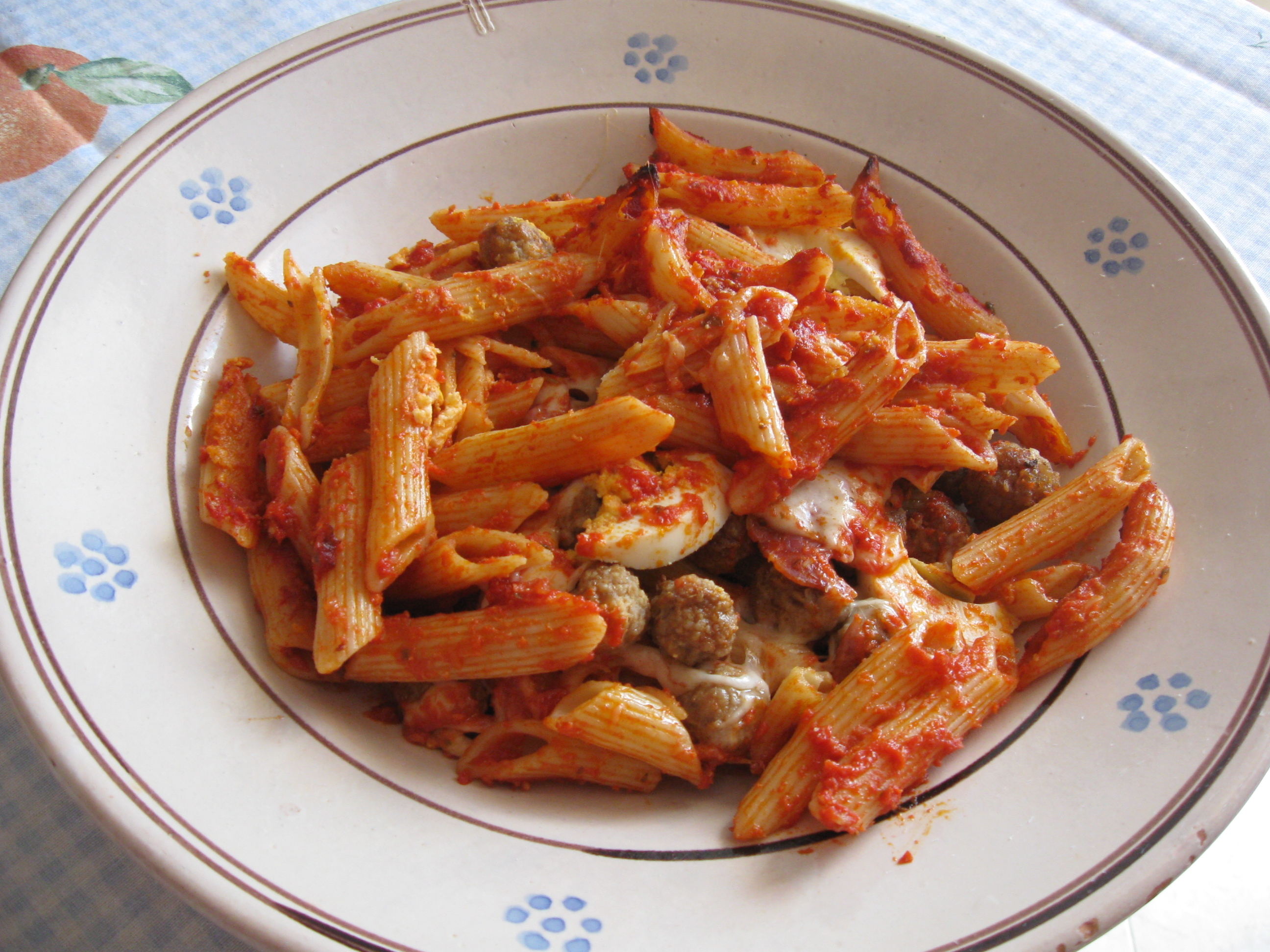
Pasta al forno

Al forno (Italian: [al ˈforno]; lit. 'to the oven', meaning 'baked') is food that has been baked in an oven. Italian dishes commonly prepared in this way include pizza, breads and pasta dishes, notably lasagna.

Pasta is sometimes boiled before it is baked in al forno pasta dishes. This double cooking means that it is served soft, not with the firm al dente consistency that some Italians prefer in pasta dishes.

== History and culture ==
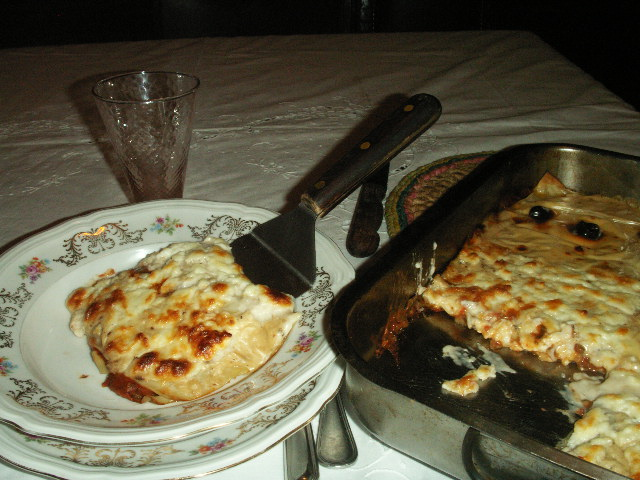
Lasagna is baked both to cook the filling and melt the cheese topping.

Southern Italy has a tradition of wood-burning ovens and open-flame grills. A wood-fired oven and al forno dishes are a feature of many Italian restaurants. Brick and clay ovens are a key feature of cuisines of the Mediterranean and Middle East, with wood being the main fuel for many parts of Europe for many centuries. A typical oven found in Italian restaurants is brick lined with an arched oven door, and a wooden board with a very long handle is used to place the food to be cooked in the centre of the oven.

== See also ==
The dictionary definition of al forno at Wiktionary

- List of baked goods
- Pasta al forno
- Anelletti al forno
