= Zite =

Zite may refer to:

- Ziti, a shape of extruded pasta
- Zite, news aggregator for Flipboard
