= Anelletti al forno =

Baked pasta

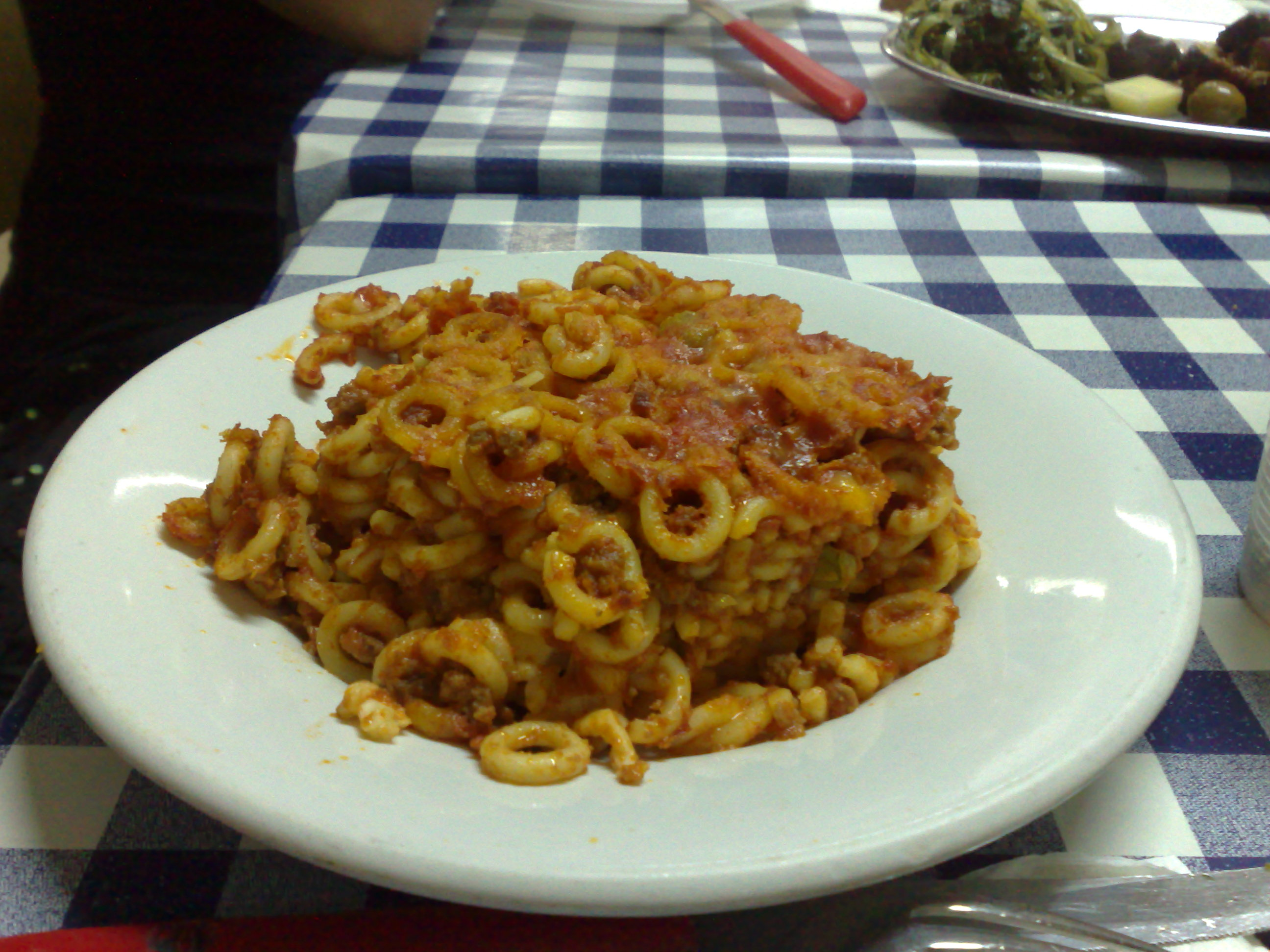
- Alternative names: Timballo di anelletti
- Place of origin: Italy
- Region or state: Sicily
- Variations: Timballetti

Anelletti al forno (lit. 'baked anelletti') or timballo di anelletti is a type of baked pasta called pasta al forno typical of Palermo and its province but also widespread in the rest of Sicily.

== Characteristics ==
Anelletti can be found in commercial establishments, restaurants, diners, fryers, and bars with delicatessens, but they are also consumed as a family dish especially on holidays because of the long preparation required.

The pasta used to prepare baked pasta dishes are anelletti (ring-shaped pasta) of about one centimeter and with a thickness similar to bucatini. At the base of this dish is a particular ragù similar to the one from Bologna, which in the Palermo area is almost always made with the addition of peas. Among the many variants of this way of preparation, some of them include the use of ham, hard-boiled egg in the inner stuffing, others use mozzarella cheese, and still others pecorino cheese. In some gastronomies it can also be found in single portions, locally called timballetti, which are prepared in aluminum containers having the shape of a truncated cone.

== See also ==
Media related to Anelletti at Wikimedia Commons

- Sicilian cuisine
- List of pasta
- List of pasta dishes
- Al forno
