= Pasta al forno =

Italian baked pasta dish

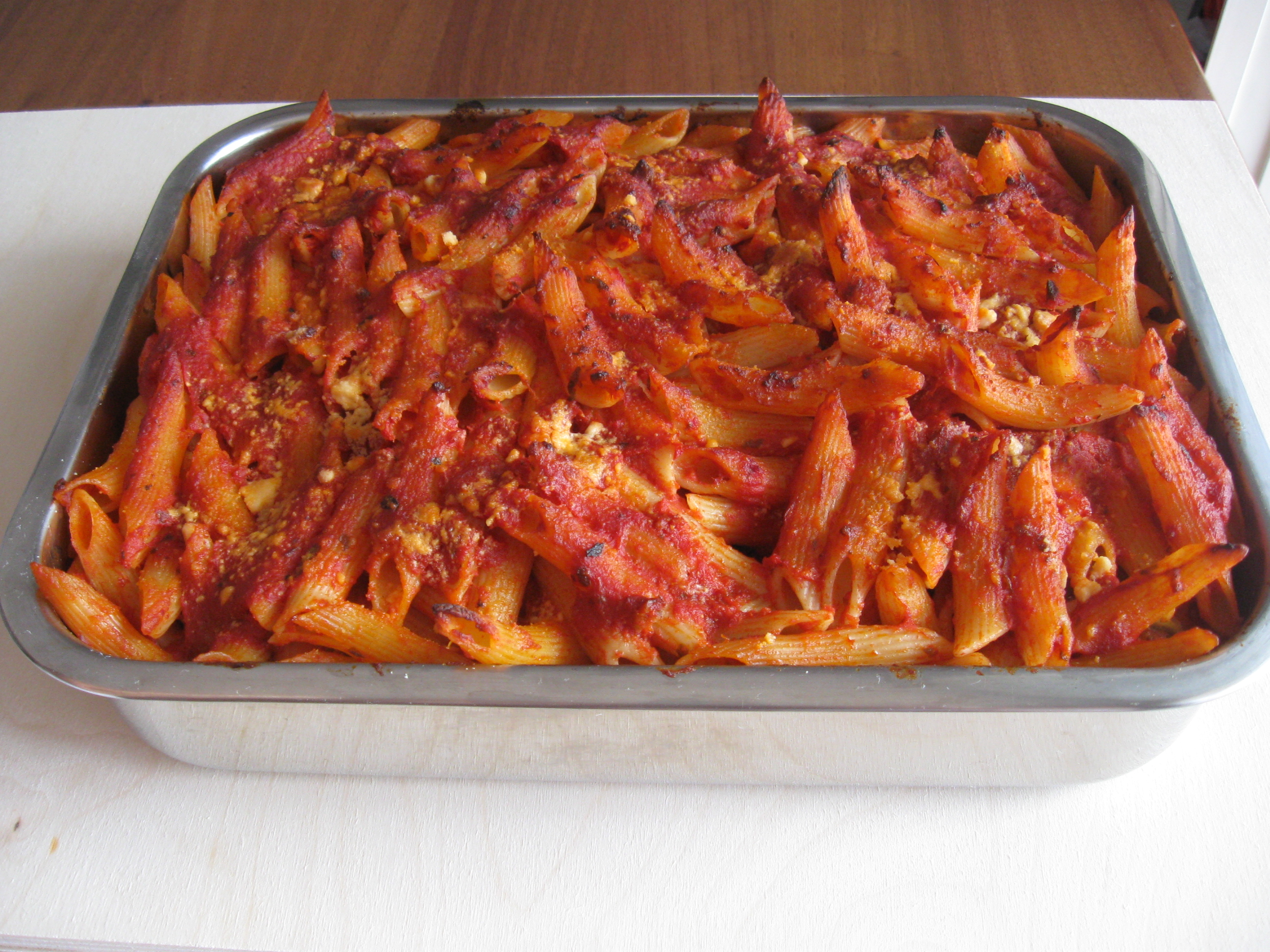
- Alternative names: Timballo di pasta
- Course: Primo (Italian course)
- Place of origin: Italy

Pasta al forno (lit. 'pasta to the oven', i.e. 'baked pasta'), also known as timballo di pasta ('pasta pie'), is a typical dish of Italian cuisine, made of (usually short) pasta covered with béchamel sauce, tomato sauce, and cheese, and cooked in the oven (al forno).

== History ==
Baked pasta can ideally be divided in two big categories: the version with béchamel sauce was born in the Renaissance courts of the center and north, as a poorer variant of meat pies, from which probably derive very famous dishes such as lasagne al forno and Emilian cannelloni; the pasta 'nfurnata or pasta 'ncasciata is instead one of the most typical dishes of Sicily (particularly of the province of Messina, in the specific of Mistretta, and of the province of Catania) and has its origins in very ancient traditions, essentially ascribable to the sumptuous timbales that Arabs introduced in Sicily during their domination dating back to the 9th century, to which is due the name timballo itself.

== See also ==
Media related to Pasta al forno at Wikimedia Commons

- Al forno
- Anelletti al forno
- Lasagna
- Pastitsio

== Bibliography ==
- Sicilia (in Italian). Touring Club Italiano. 1989. p. 108. ISBN 88-365-0350-0.
