= Pasta =

Cooked dough food in Italian cuisine

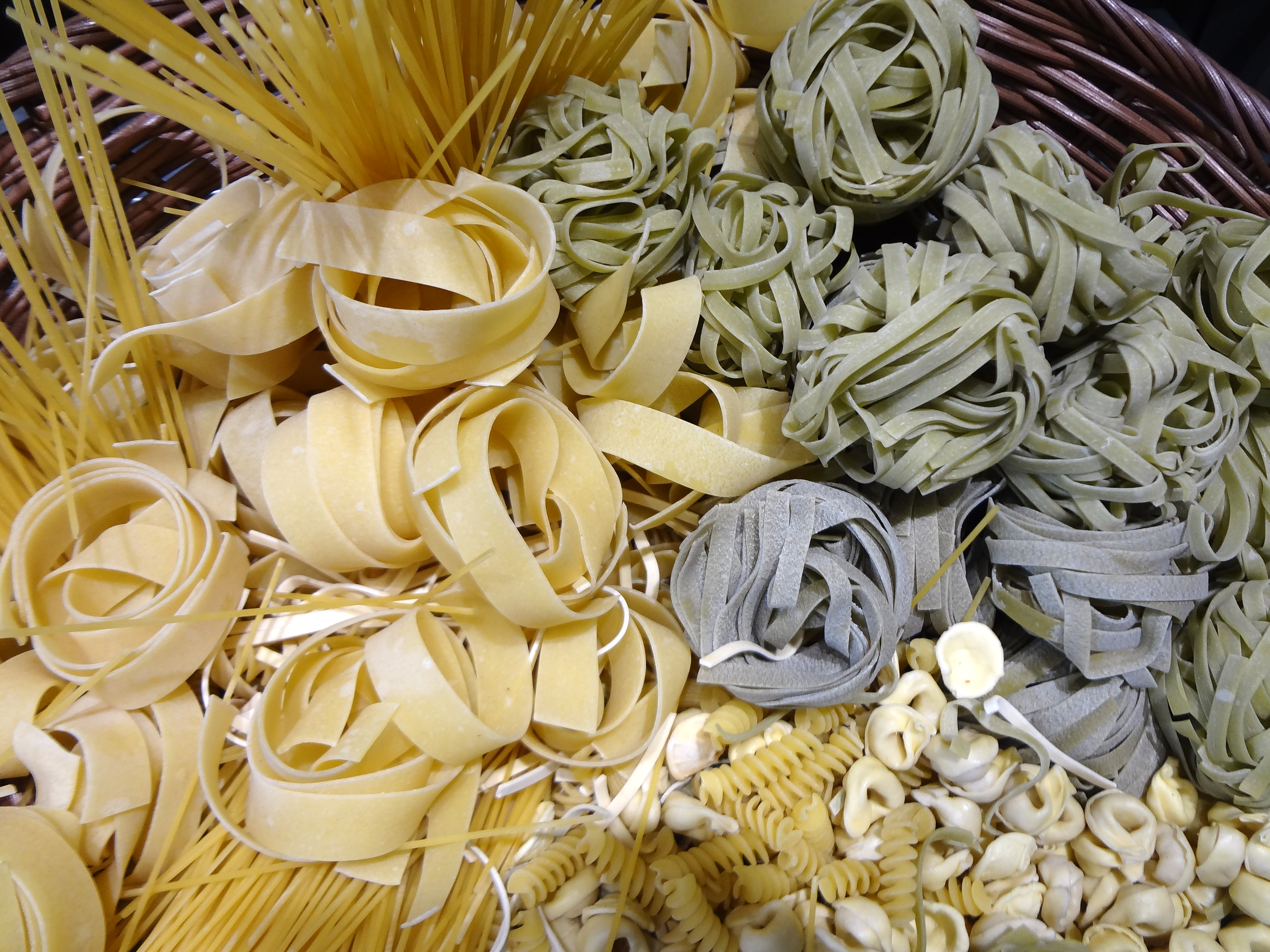
- A collection of different pasta varieties
- Type: Staple ingredient for many dishes
- Place of origin: Italy
- Main ingredients: Durum wheat flour, water/eggs
- Variations: Rice flour pasta, legume pasta

Pasta (UK: /ˈpæstə/, US: /ˈpɑːstə/; Italian: [ˈpasta]) is a type of food typically made from an unleavened dough of wheat flour mixed with water or eggs, and formed into sheets or other shapes, then cooked by boiling or baking. Pasta was originally only made with durum, although the definition has been expanded to include alternatives for a gluten-free diet, such as rice flour, or legumes such as beans or lentils. Pasta is a staple food of Italian cuisine, and many historians believe that pasta in a form recognizable today was introduced to Italy through Sicily in the Middle Ages as a result of Mediterranean trade networks.

== Categories of pasta ==
Pastas are divided into two broad categories: dried (Italian: pasta secca) and fresh (Italian: pasta fresca). Most dried pasta is produced commercially via an extrusion process, although it can be produced at home. Fresh pasta is traditionally produced by hand, sometimes with the aid of simple machines. Fresh pastas available in grocery stores are produced commercially by large-scale machines.

Both dried and fresh pastas come in a number of shapes and varieties, with 310 specific forms known by over 1,300 documented names. In Italy, the names of specific pasta shapes or types often vary by locale. For example, the pasta form cavatelli is known by 28 different names depending upon the town and region.

Both fresh and dried pastas are classically used in one of three kinds of prepared dishes: as pasta asciutta (or pastasciutta), cooked pasta is plated and served with a complementary sauce or condiment; a second classification of pasta dishes is pasta in brodo, in which the pasta is part of a soup-type dish. A third category is pasta al forno, in which the pasta is incorporated into a dish that is subsequently baked in the oven. Pasta dishes are generally simple, but individual dishes vary in preparation. Some pasta dishes are served as a small first course or for light lunches, such as pasta salads. Other dishes may be portioned larger and used for dinner. Pasta sauces similarly may vary in taste, color and texture.

== Types of pasta ==
Common forms of pasta include long and short shapes, tubes, flat shapes or sheets, miniature shapes for soup, those meant to be filled or stuffed, and specialty or decorative shapes.

Long pasta is typically made with the rolling and cutting method or by extruding. They are generally complemented with thinner toppings to prevent chunks of meat or vegetables in a thick sauce from sticking to the pasta. Short pastas are made by extrusion and are usually paired with thicker sauces as their shape allows them to hold the sauce better. Stuffed pasta is pasta folded to hold ingredients like meat and vegetables.

== Etymology ==
The word pasta's earliest appearances in the English language are in the 1830s. It comes from the Italian pasta, meaning "paste", from the Late Latin pasta, itself from the Greek pastē, meaning "barley porridge".

== History ==
=== Early history and origins ===
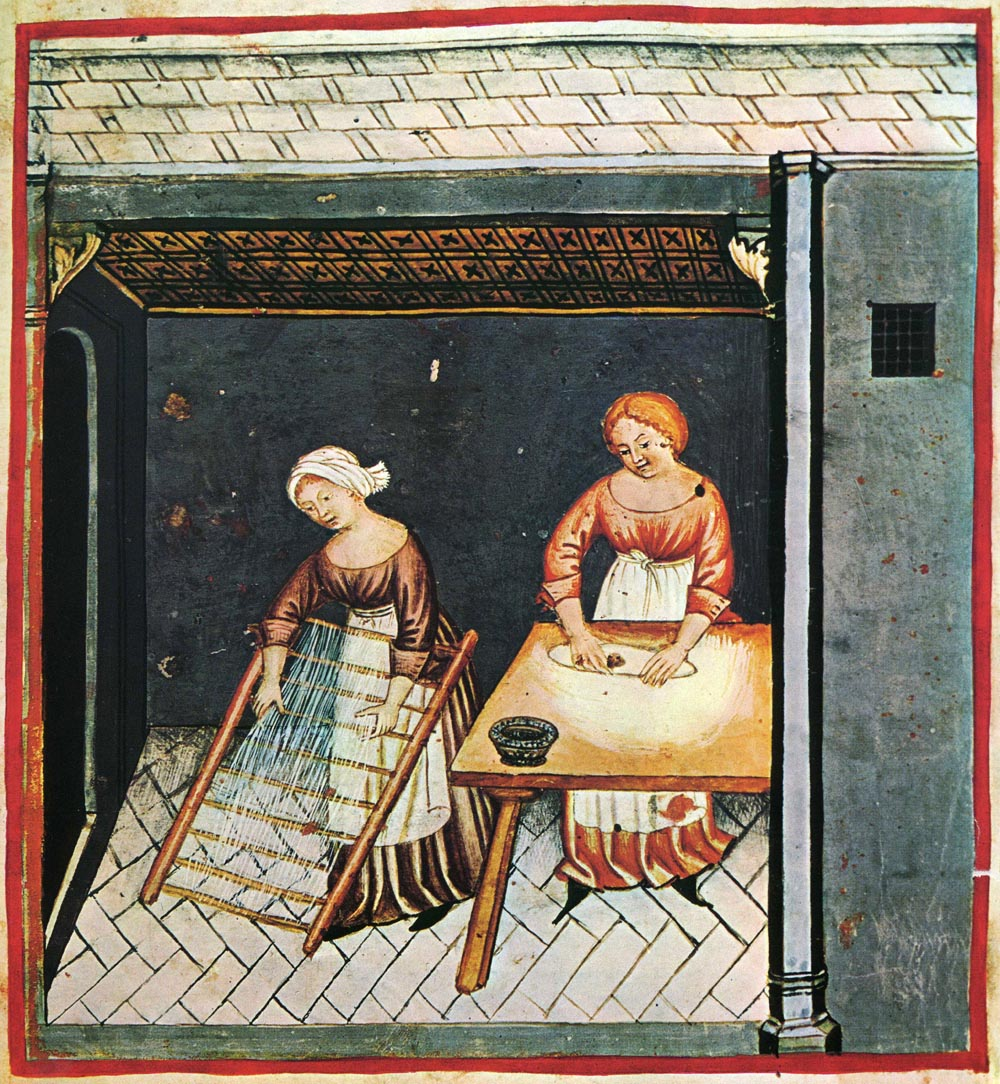
Making pasta; illustration from the 15th-century edition of Tacuinum Sanitatis, a Latin translation of the Arabic work Taqwīm al-sihha by Ibn Butlan

Some Italian writers have claimed that evidence of Etruscans making pasta dates back to 400 BCE. However, many food historians do not believe this claim is supported by sufficient archaeological evidence and instead believe that the dish was only established in Italy during the Middle Ages.

Ancient Mediterranean cultures produced various forms of dough-based foods that had similarities to pasta. In the 1st-century writings of Horace, lagana (sing.: laganum) were fine sheets of fried dough and were an everyday foodstuff. Writing in the 2nd century, Athenaeus of Naucratis provides a recipe for lagana which he attributes to the 1st-century Chrysippus of Tyana: sheets of dough made of wheat flour and the juice of crushed lettuce, then flavored with spices and deep-fried in oil.

An early 5th-century cookbook describes a dish called lagana that consisted of layers of dough with meat stuffing, an ancestor of modern-day lasagna. However, the method of cooking these sheets of dough does not correspond to the modern definition of either a fresh or dry pasta product, which only had similar basic ingredients and perhaps the shape.

=== Spread of noodles and medieval development ===
Noodles made from wheat was a prominent food in China during the Han dynasty. According to Françoise Sabban and Silvano Serventi in Pasta: The Story of a Universal Food, wheat-based pasta traditions had developed in China long before they became established in Europe.

According to food historian Gil Marks in Encyclopedia of Jewish Food, European dough-based recipes were commonly baked or fried and "strips of dough" were not boiled in water before the medieval period. Marks wrote that noodle-making traditions spread from China along the Silk Road to Central Asia and reached Persia by the fourth or fifth century. In Persia, they were known as laksha, the Farsi word for "slippery". This food later reached Sicily and Spain through Arab influence, where noodles were known as itriya. Marks estimated it subsequently spread to mainland Italy sometime after the tenth century.

Historians have noted several lexical milestones relevant to pasta, none of which changes these basic characteristics. For example, the works of the 2nd-century Greek physician Galen mention itrion, homogeneous compounds made of flour and water. The Jerusalem Talmud records that itrium, a kind of boiled dough, was common in Palestine from the 3rd to 5th centuries. A dictionary compiled by the 9th-century Arab physician and lexicographer Isho bar Ali defines itriyya, the Arabic cognate, as string-like shapes made of semolina and dried before cooking.

The geographical text of Muhammad al-Idrisi, compiled for the Norman king of Sicily Roger II in 1154, mentions itriyya manufactured and exported from Norman Sicily:

West of Termini there is a delightful settlement called Trabia [along the Sicilian coast east of Palermo]. Its ever-flowing streams propel a number of mills. Here there are huge buildings in the countryside where they make vast quantities of itriyya which is exported everywhere: to Calabria, to Muslim and Christian countries. Very many shiploads are sent.

One form of itriyya with a long history is lagana, which in Latin refers to thin sheets of dough, and gave rise to the Italian lasagna.

=== Development of pasta in Italy ===
The first concrete information on pasta products in Italy dates to the 13th or 14th centuries. Food historians estimate that the dish probably took hold in Italy as a result of extensive Mediterranean trading in the Middle Ages. From the 13th century, references to pasta dishes crop up with increasing frequency across the Italian peninsula. In the 14th-century writer Boccaccio's collection of earthy tales, The Decameron, he recounts a mouthwatering fantasy concerning a mountain of Parmesan cheese down which pasta chefs roll macaroni and ravioli to gluttons waiting below.

The popular belief that Marco Polo introduced pasta to Italy from China to Italy is considered a myth by many historians. Rustichello da Pisa writes in his Travels that Marco Polo described a food similar to lagana. The exact route where pasta had first reached Europe is uncertain, however there are many theories of its transmission. Jeffrey Steingarten asserts that Moors introduced pasta in the Emirate of Sicily in the 9th century, mentioning also that traces of pasta have been found in ancient Greece and that Jane Grigson believed the Marco Polo story to have originated in the 1920s or 1930s in an advertisement for a Canadian spaghetti company.

In the 14th and 15th centuries, dried pasta became popular for its easy storage. This allowed people to store pasta on ships when exploring the New World. A century later, pasta was present around the globe during the voyages of discovery.

Although tomatoes were introduced to Italy in the 16th century and incorporated in Italian cuisine in the 17th century, description of the first Italian tomato sauces dates from the late 18th century: the first written record of pasta with tomato sauce can be found in the 1790 cookbook L'Apicio Moderno by Roman chef Francesco Leonardi.

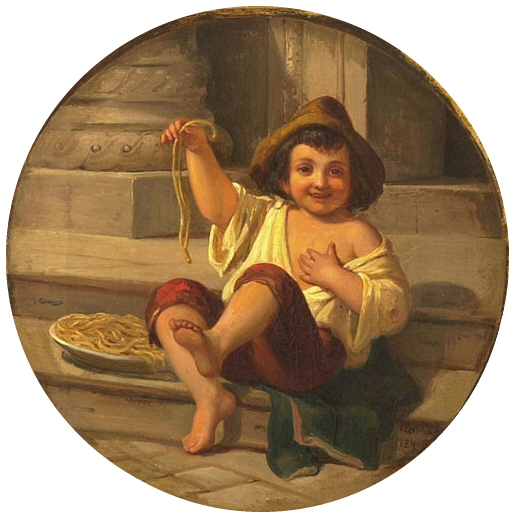
Boy with Spaghetti by Julius Moser, c. 1808

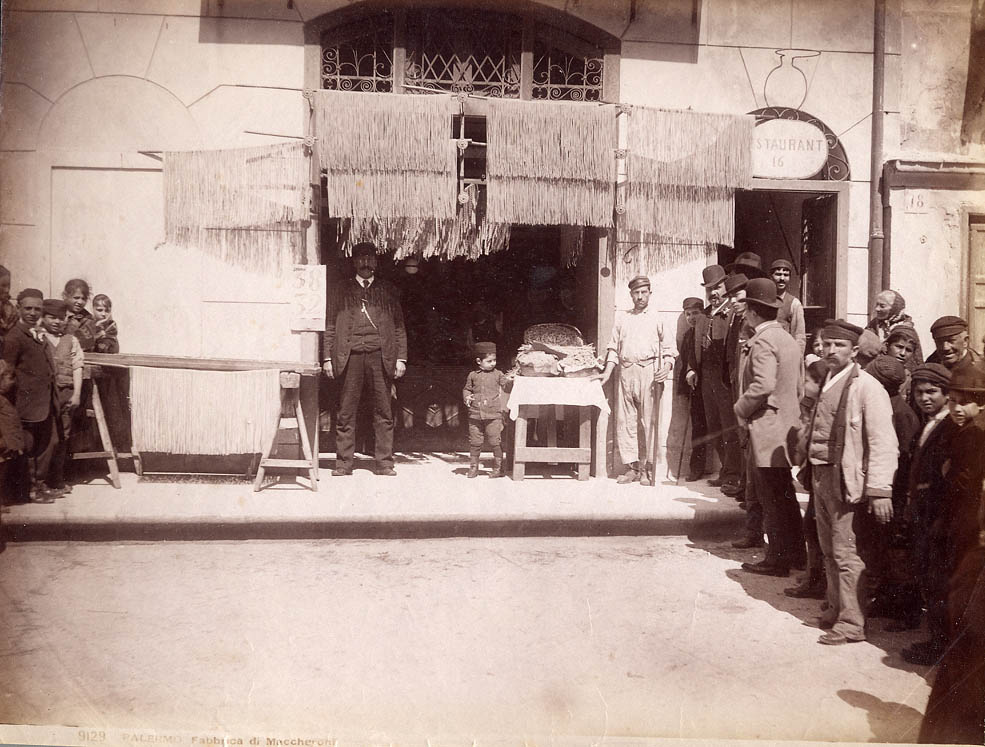
Macaroni factory, Palermo, Italy

=== Industrial production ===
At the beginning of the 17th century, Naples had rudimentary machines for producing pasta, later establishing the kneading machine and press, making pasta manufacturing cost-effective.

In 1740, a license for the first pasta factory was issued in Venice. During the 1800s, watermills and stone grinders were used to separate semolina from the bran, initiating expansion of the pasta market.

In 1859, Joseph Topits (1824−1876) founded Hungary's first pasta factory, in the city of Pest, which worked with steam machines; it was one of the first pasta factories in Central Europe. By 1867, Buitoni Company in Sansepolcro, Tuscany, was an established pasta manufacturer.

During the early 1900s, artificial drying and extrusion processes enabled greater variety of pasta preparation and larger volumes for export, beginning a period called "The Industry of Pasta". In 1884, the Zátka Brothers's plant in Boršov nad Vltavou was founded, making it Bohemia's first pasta factory.

=== Modern era ===
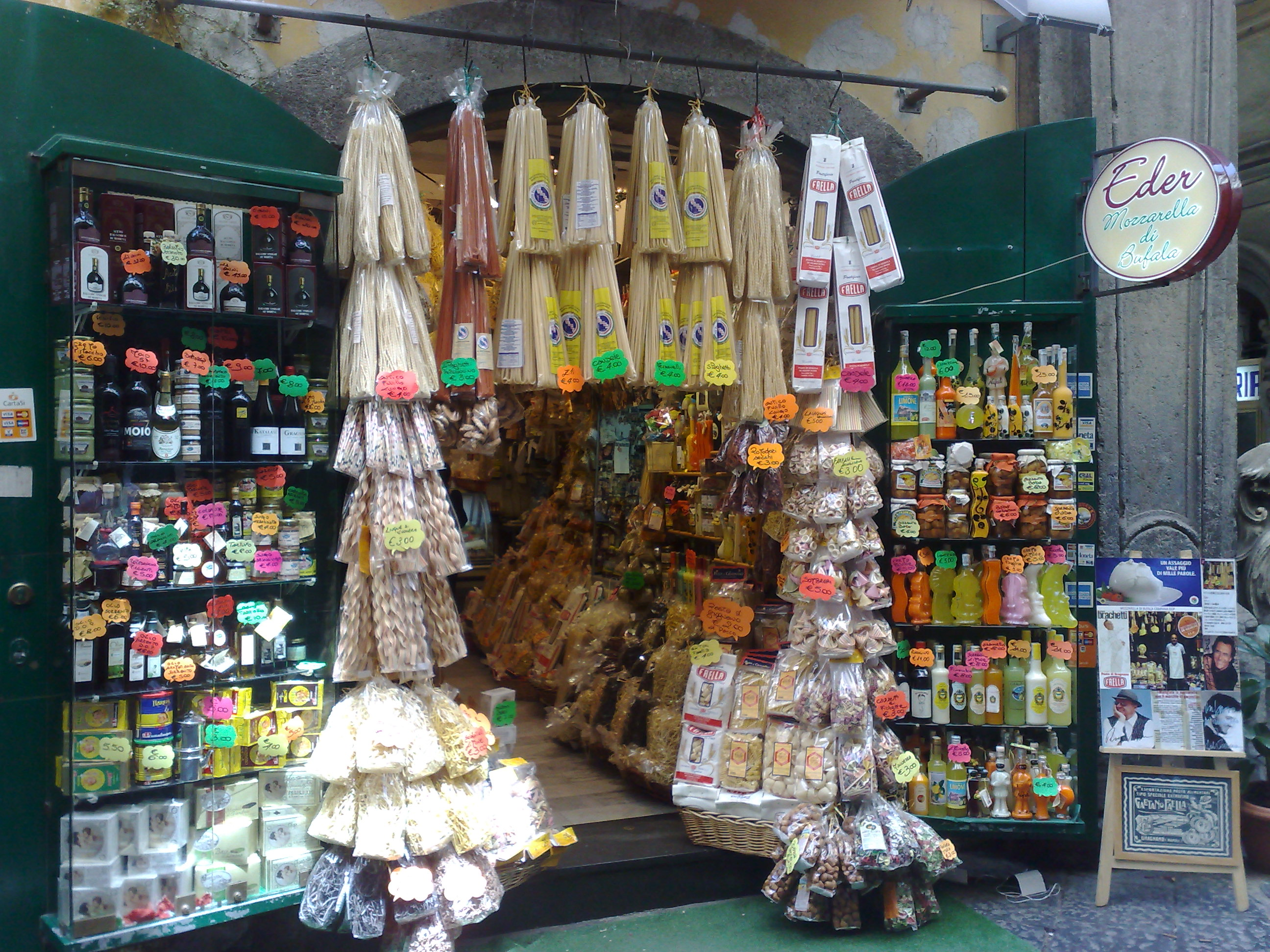
Typical products shop in Naples, Italy, with pasta on display

The art of pasta making and the devotion to the food as a whole has evolved since pasta was first conceptualized. In 2008, it was estimated that Italians ate over 27 kg (60 lb) of pasta per person, per year, easily beating Americans, who ate about 9 kg (20 lb) per person.

As the individual consumption of pasta exceeds the average production of wheat in the country, Italy frequently imports wheat for pasta making. In contemporary society, pasta is ubiquitous and there is a variety of types in local supermarkets, in many countries. With the worldwide demand for this staple food, pasta is now largely mass-produced in factories and only a tiny proportion is crafted by hand.

== Ingredients and preparation ==
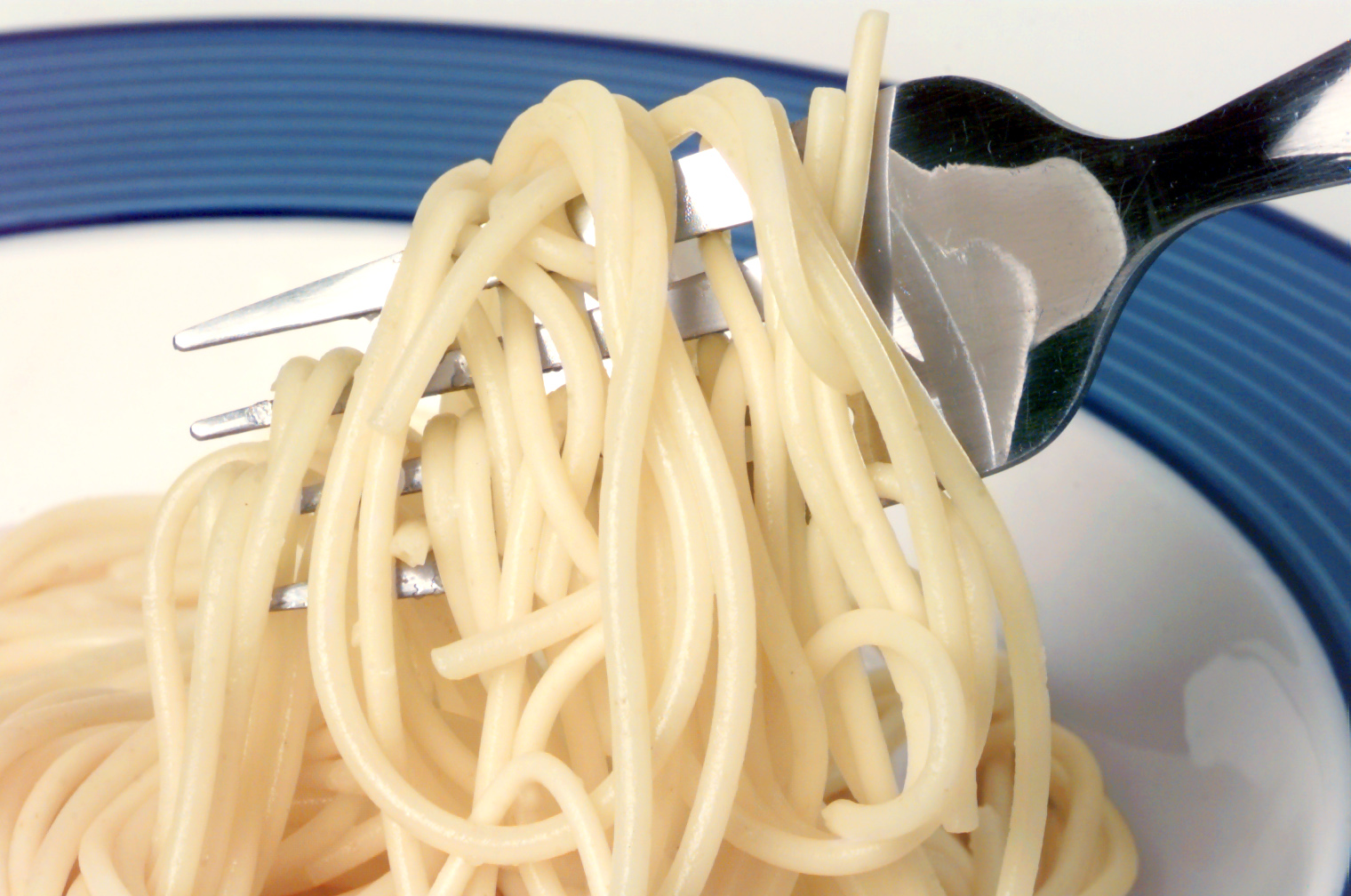
Pasta made from durum wheat

Since at least the time of Cato's De Agri Cultura, basic pasta dough has been made mostly of wheat flour or semolina, with durum wheat used predominantly in the south and soft wheat in the north of Italy. Regionally other grains have been used, including those from barley, buckwheat, rye, rice and maize, as well as chestnut and chickpea flours. Liquid, often in the form of eggs, is used to turn the flour into a dough.

To address the needs of people affected by gluten-related disorders (such as coeliac disease, non-celiac gluten sensitivity and wheat allergy sufferers), some recipes use rice or maize for making pasta. Grain flours may also be supplemented with cooked potatoes.

Other additions to the basic flour-liquid mixture may include vegetable purees such as spinach or tomato, mushrooms, cheeses, herbs, spices and other seasonings. While pastas are, most typically, made from unleavened doughs, at least nine different pasta forms are known to use yeast-raised doughs.

Additives in dried, commercially sold pasta include vitamins and minerals that are lost from the durum wheat endosperm during milling. They are added back to the semolina flour once it is ground, creating enriched flour. Micronutrients added may include niacin (vitamin B3), riboflavin (vitamin B2), folate, thiamine (vitamin B1) and ferrous iron.

Making fresh pasta by hand
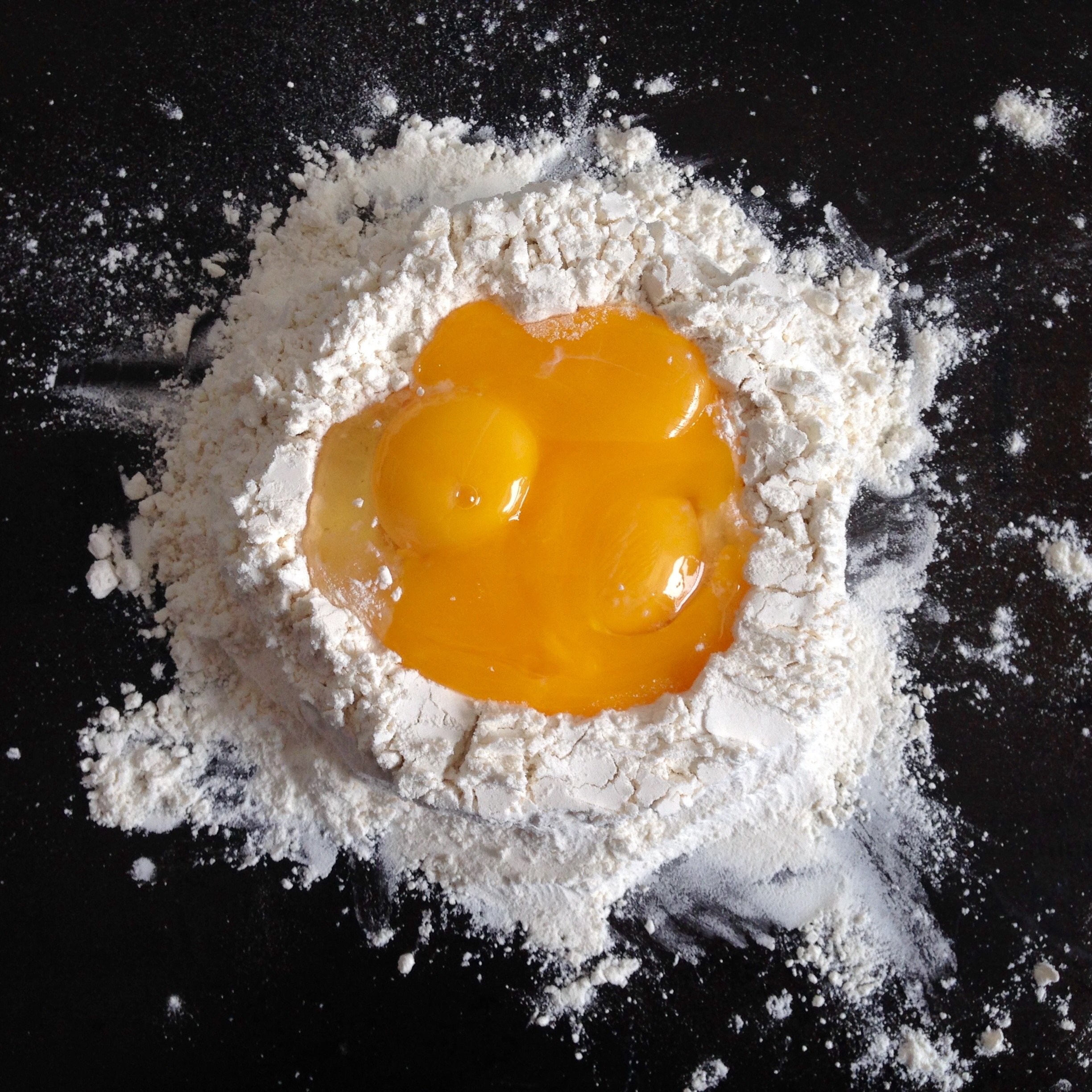
Eggs are cracked into a well of flour.

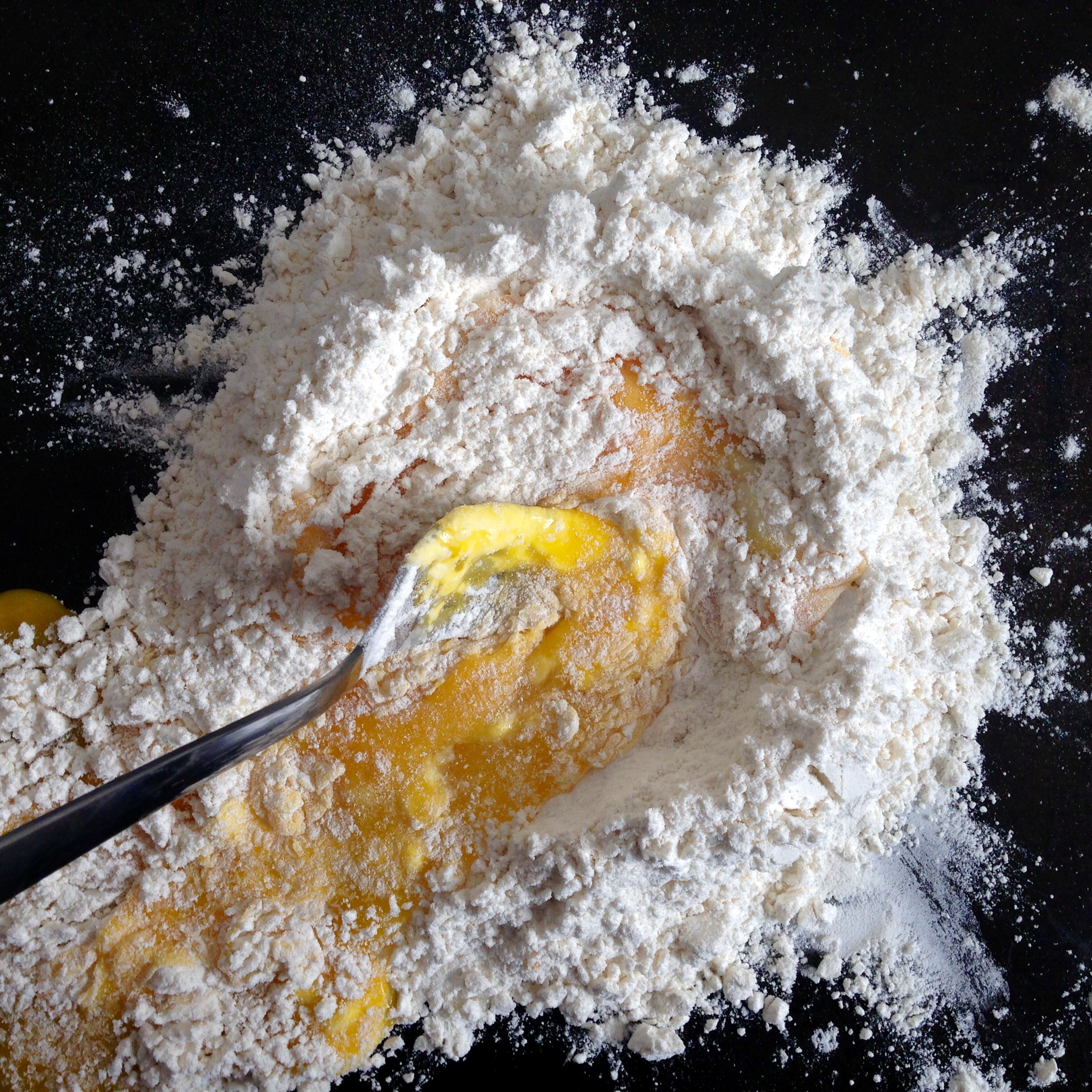
Ingredients are mixed.

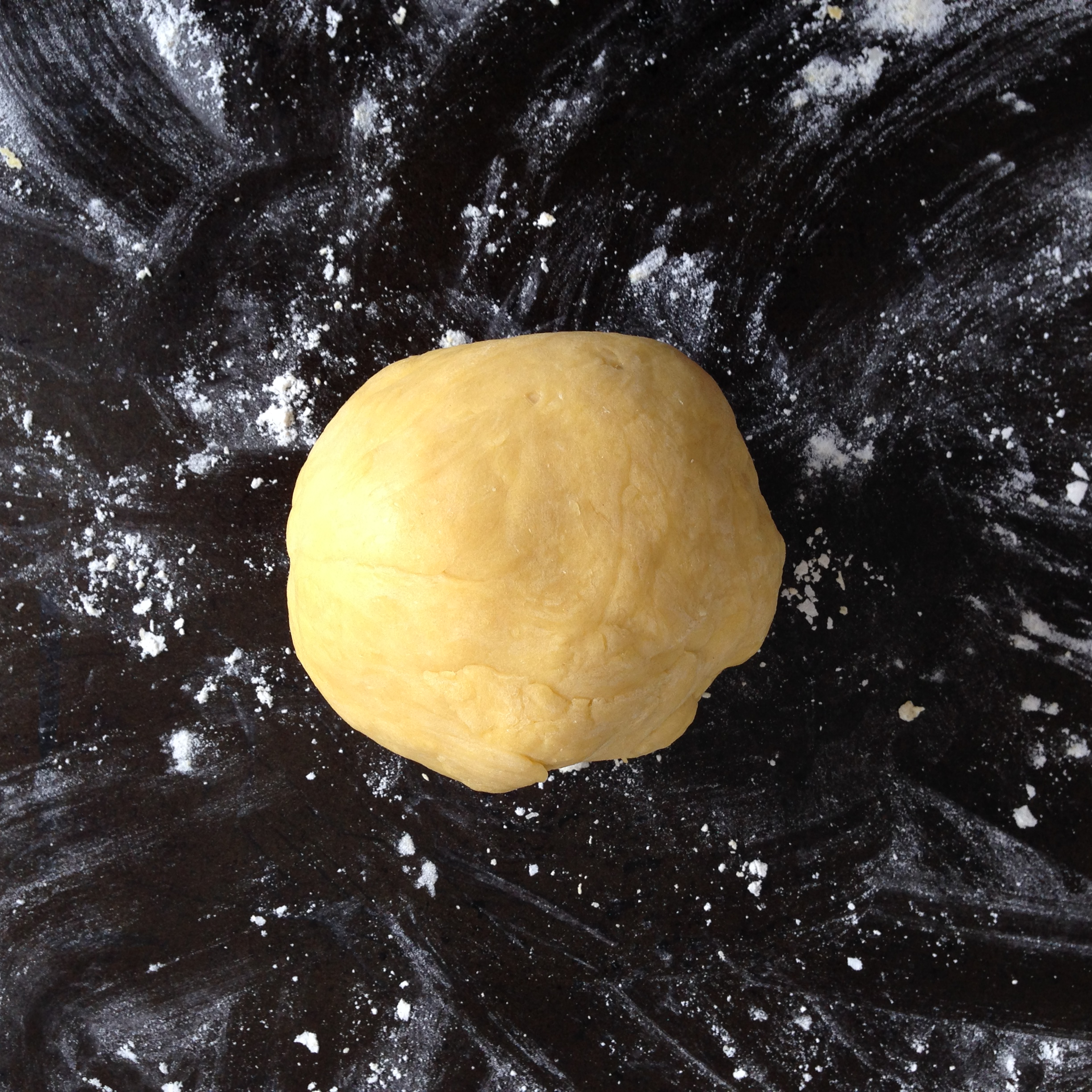
The mixture is kneaded into a ball of dough.

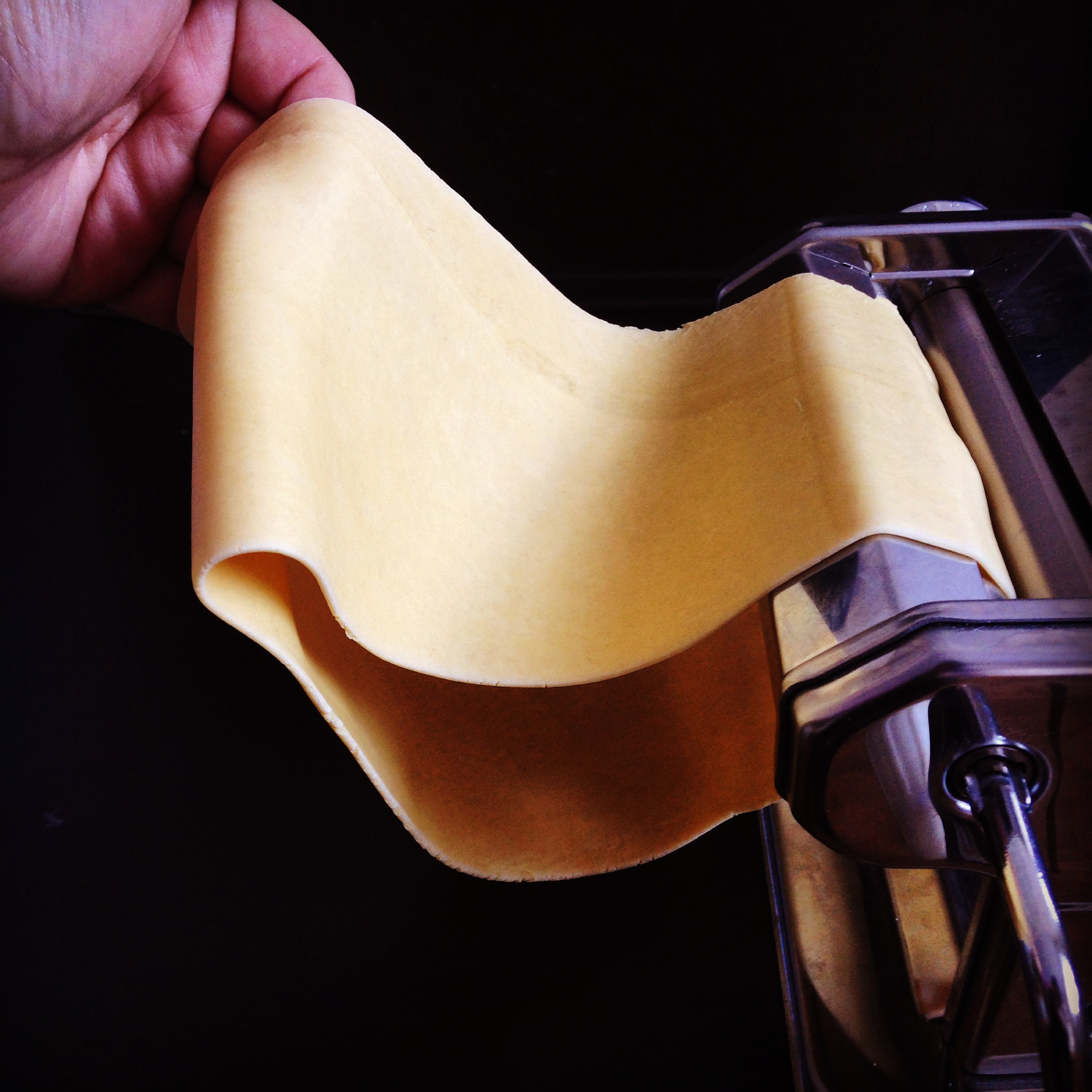
Dough is rolled into thin sheets.

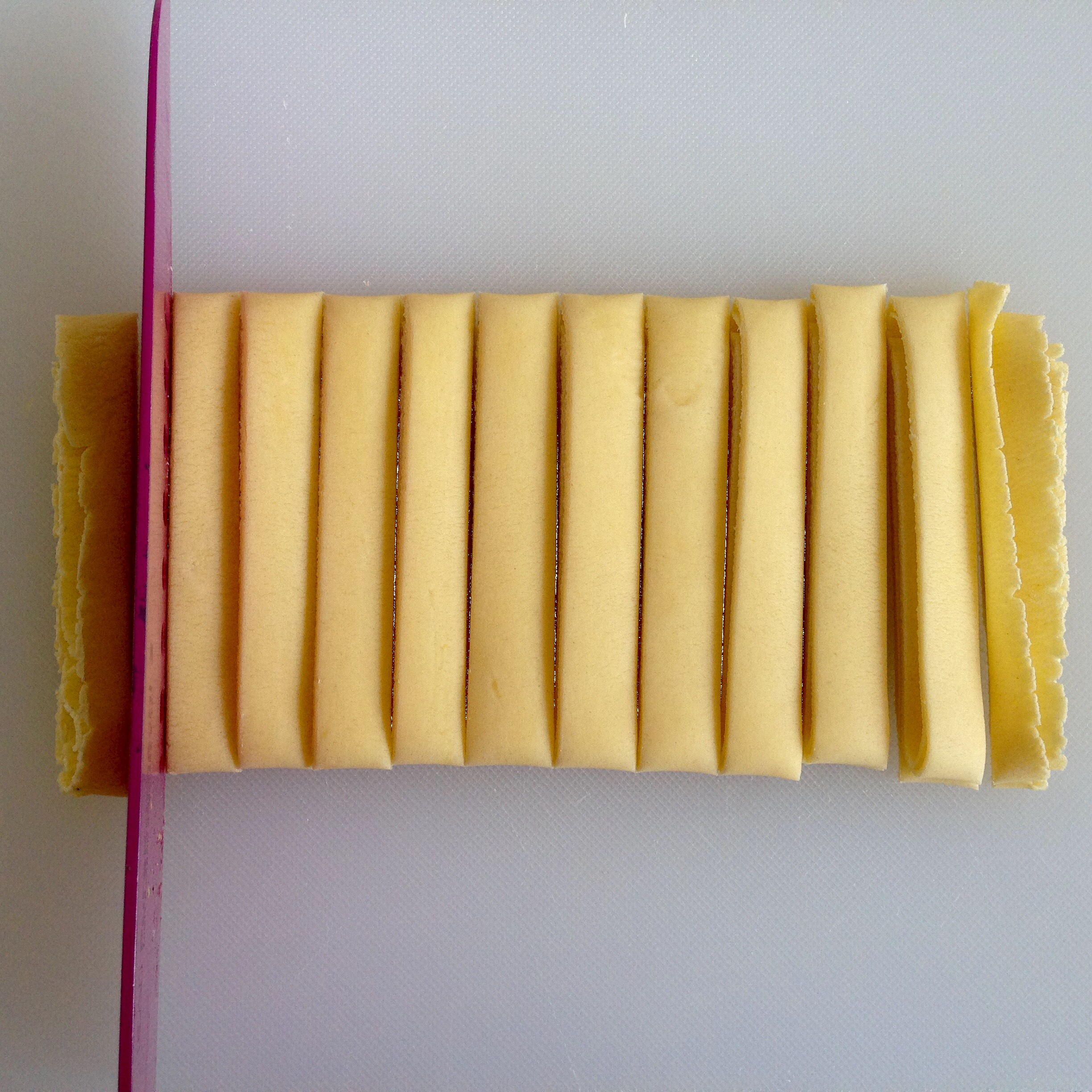
Sheets of pasta are folded and cut into slices.

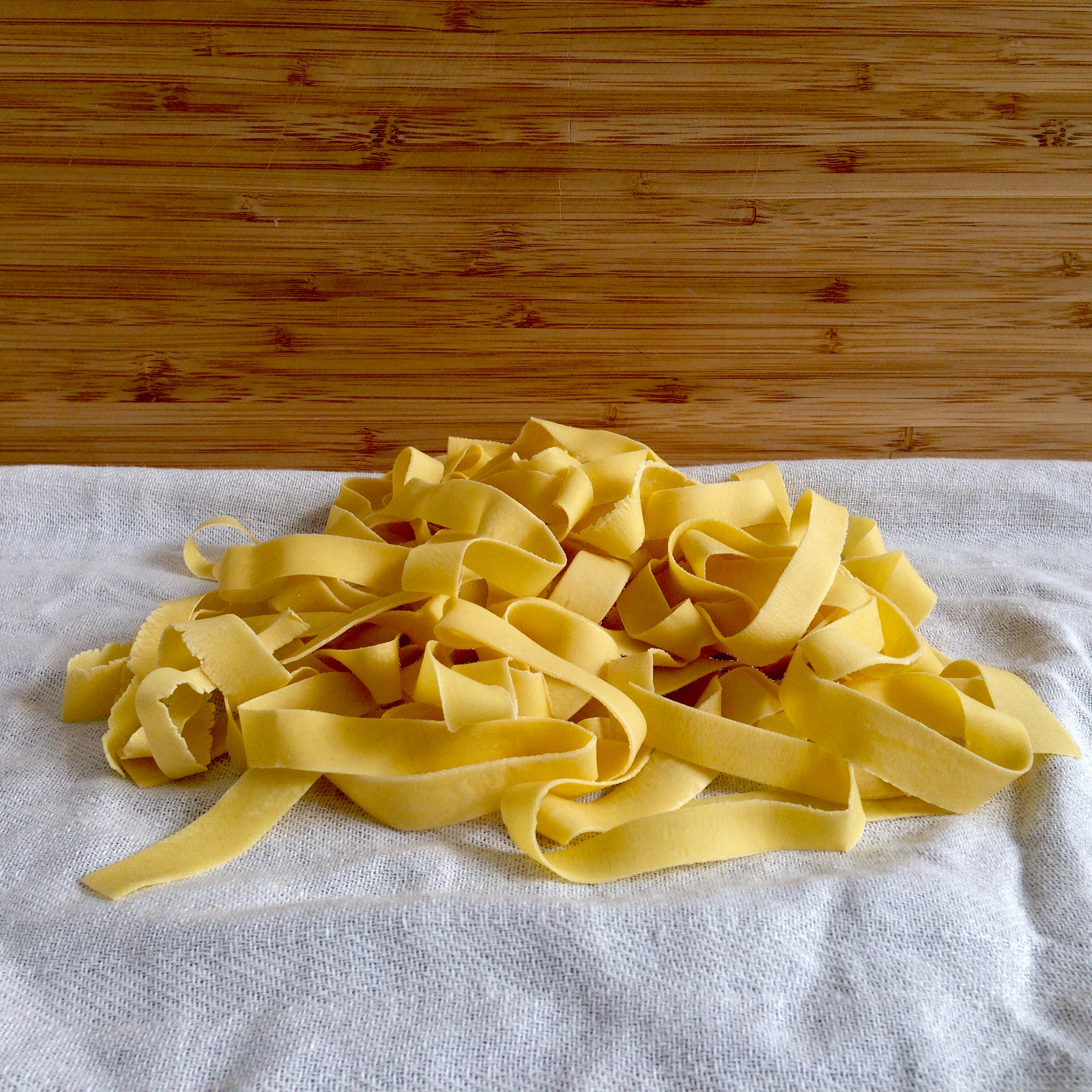
Fresh pasta

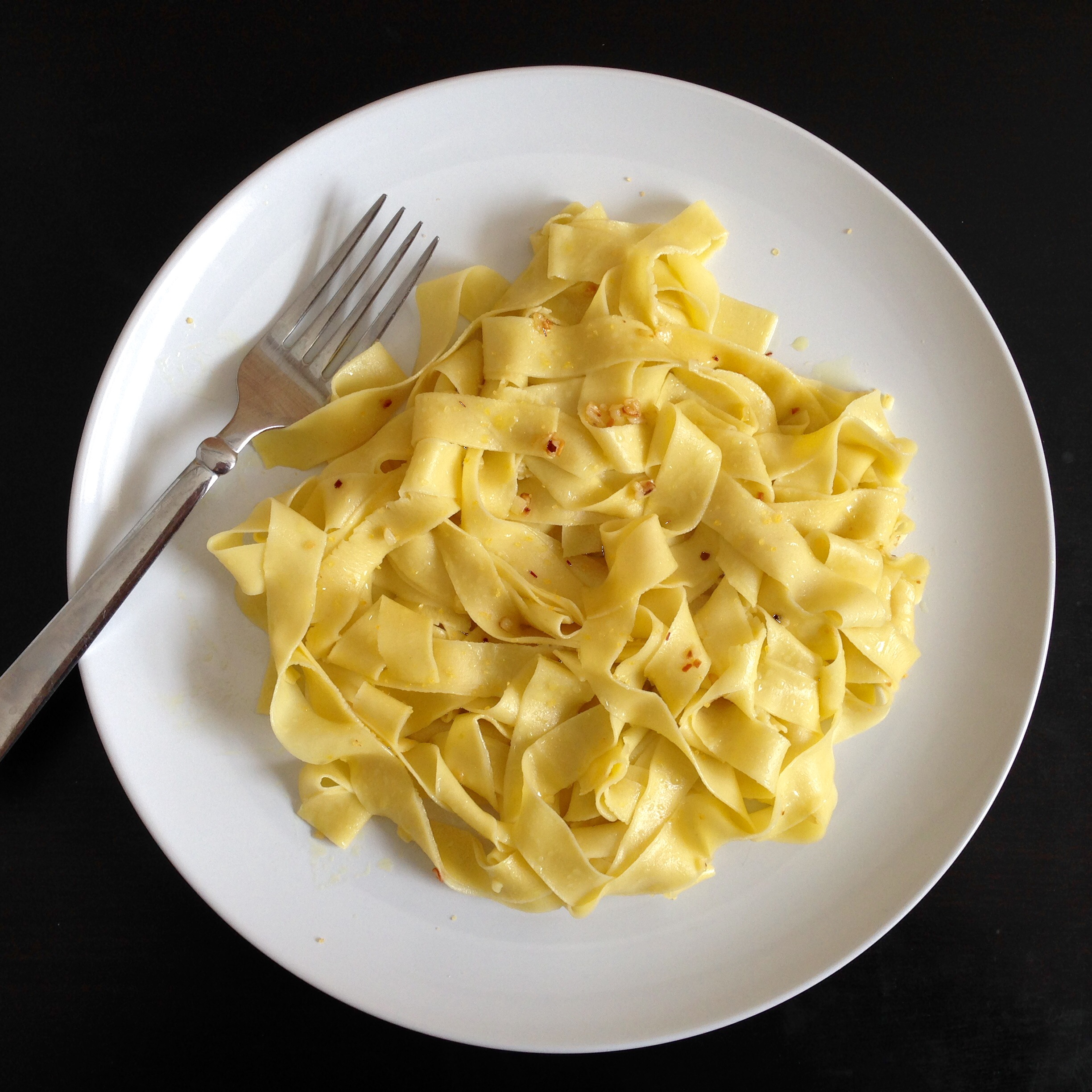
A dish made from homemade pasta

== Varieties ==
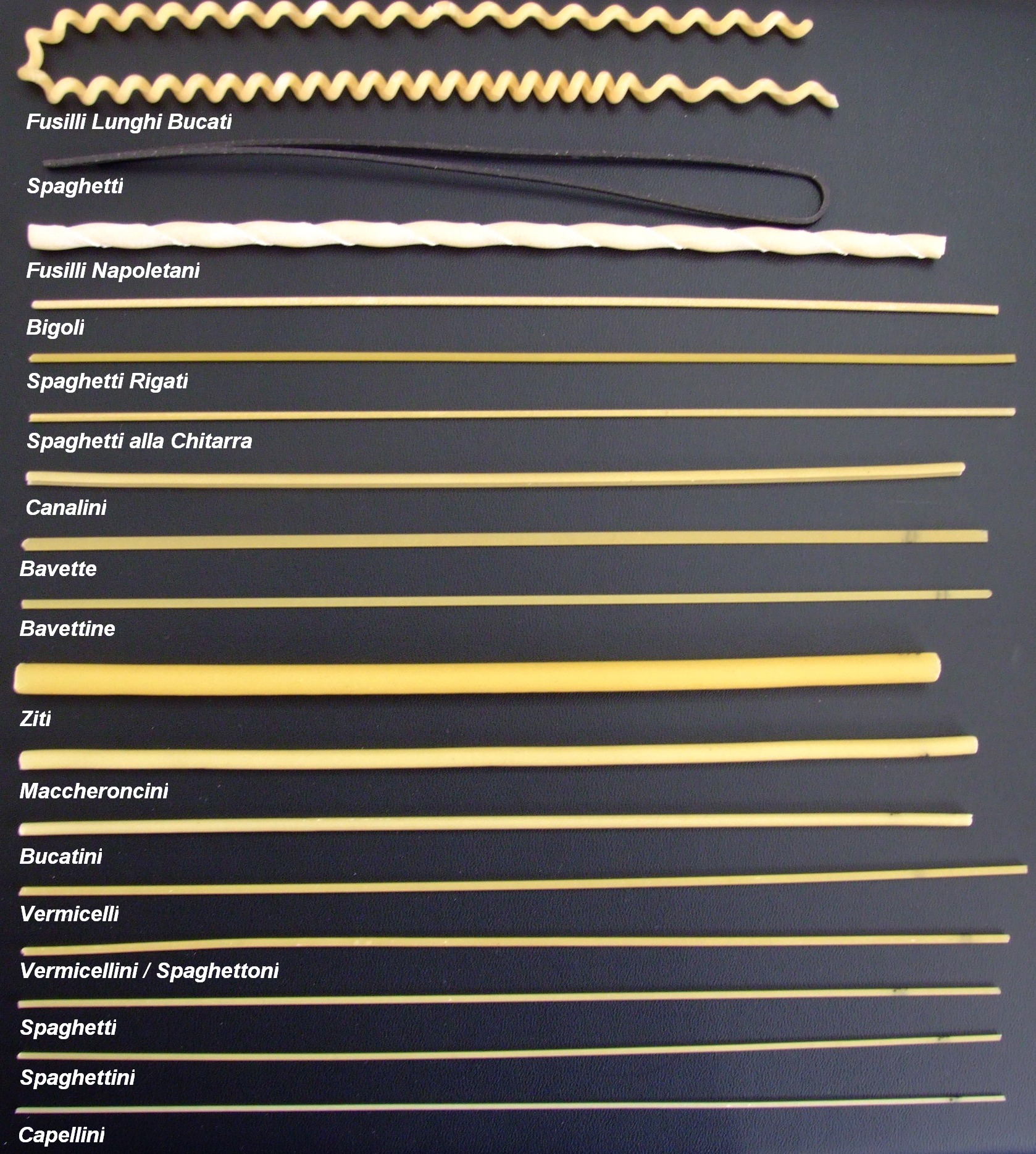
Long pasta

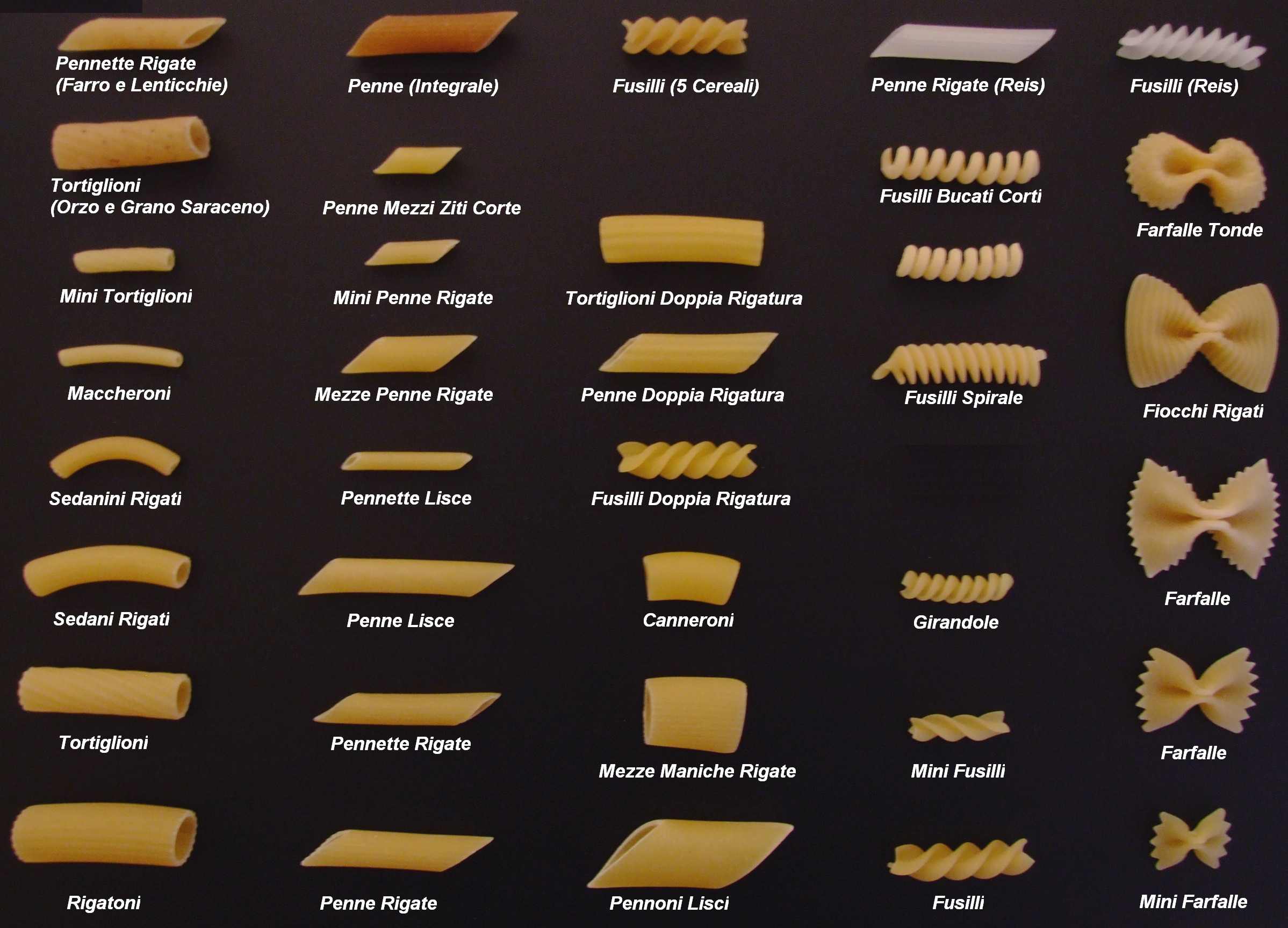
Short pasta

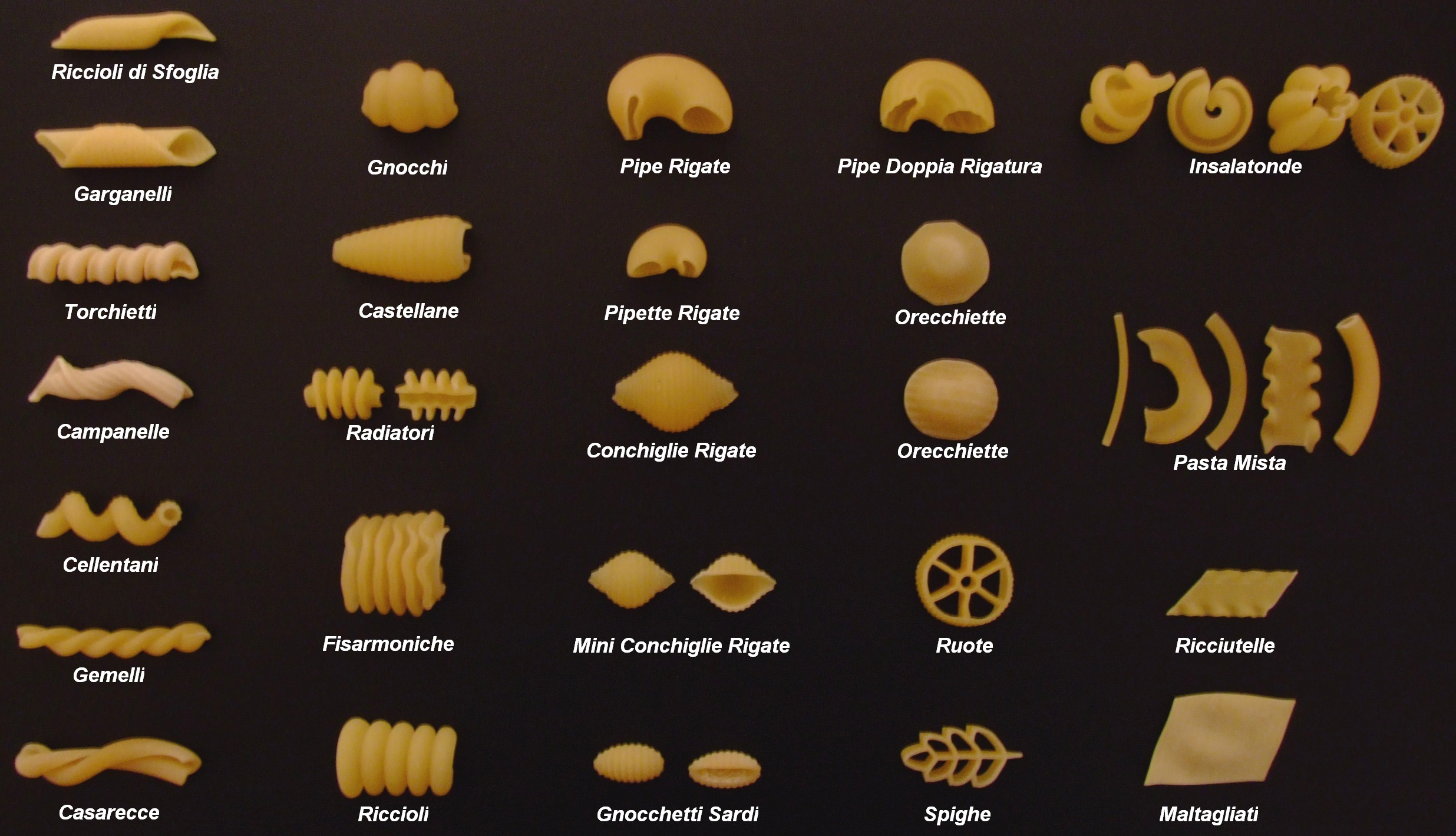
Short pasta

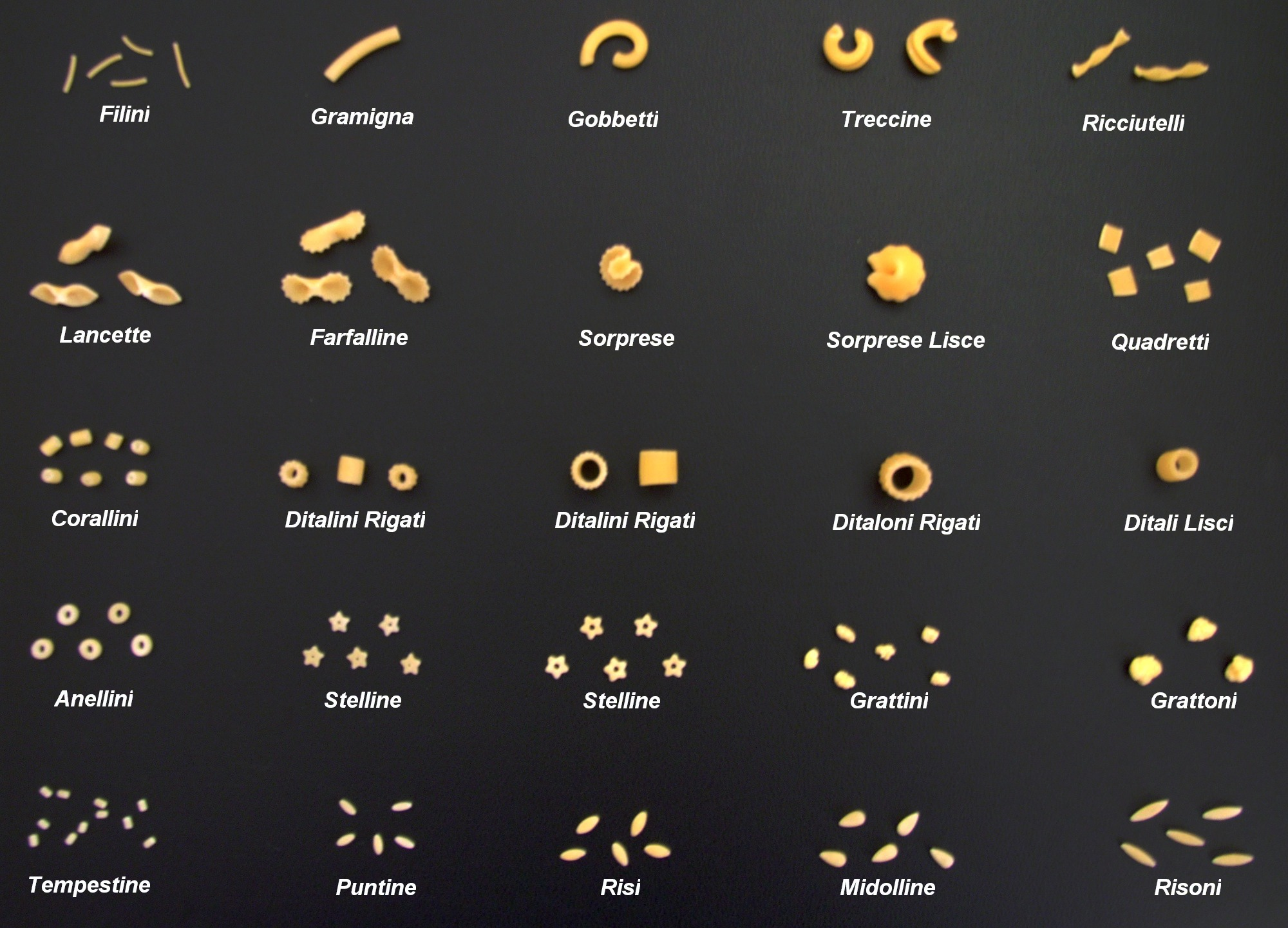
Minute pasta pastina, used for soups

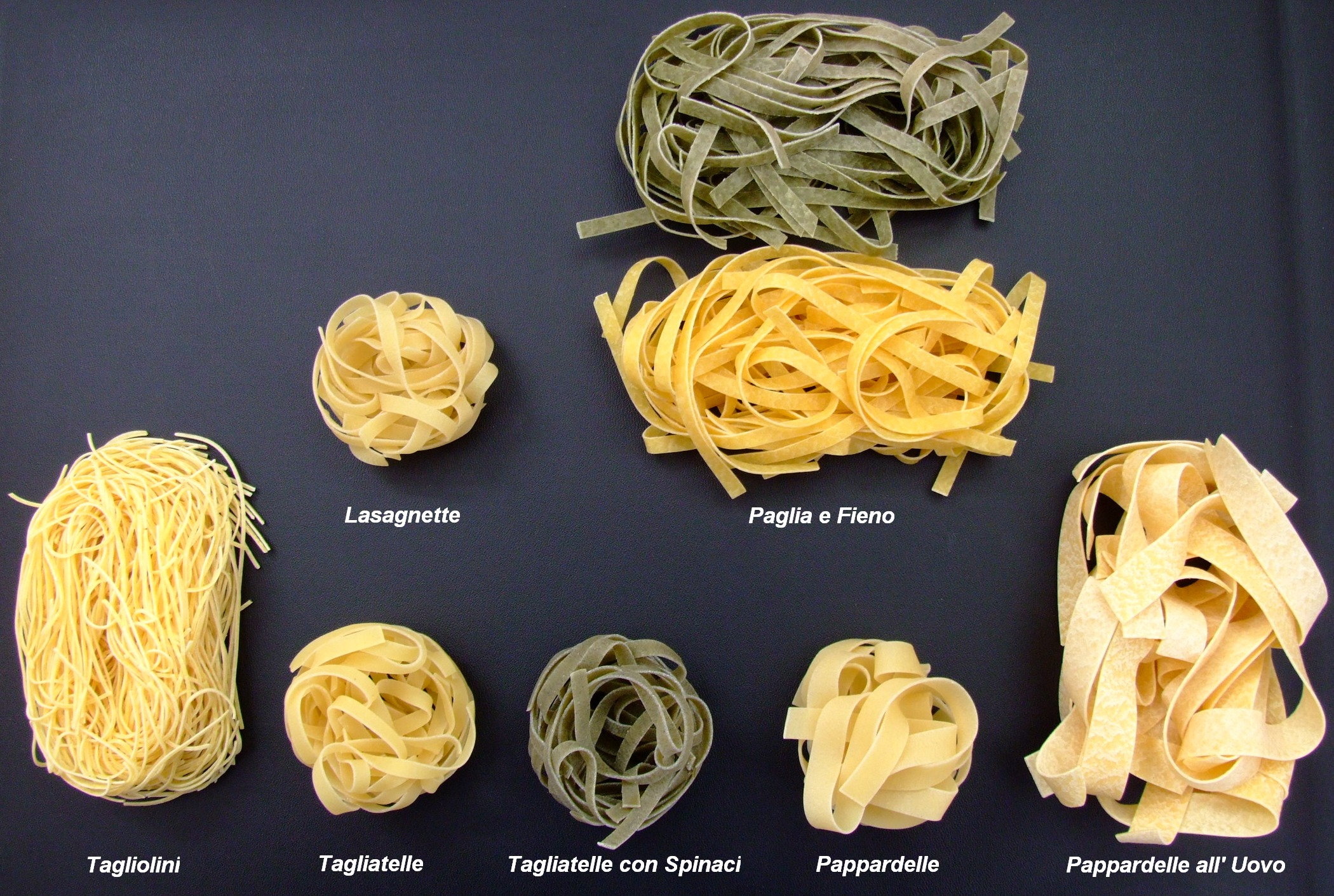
Pasta all'uovo (lit. 'egg pasta')

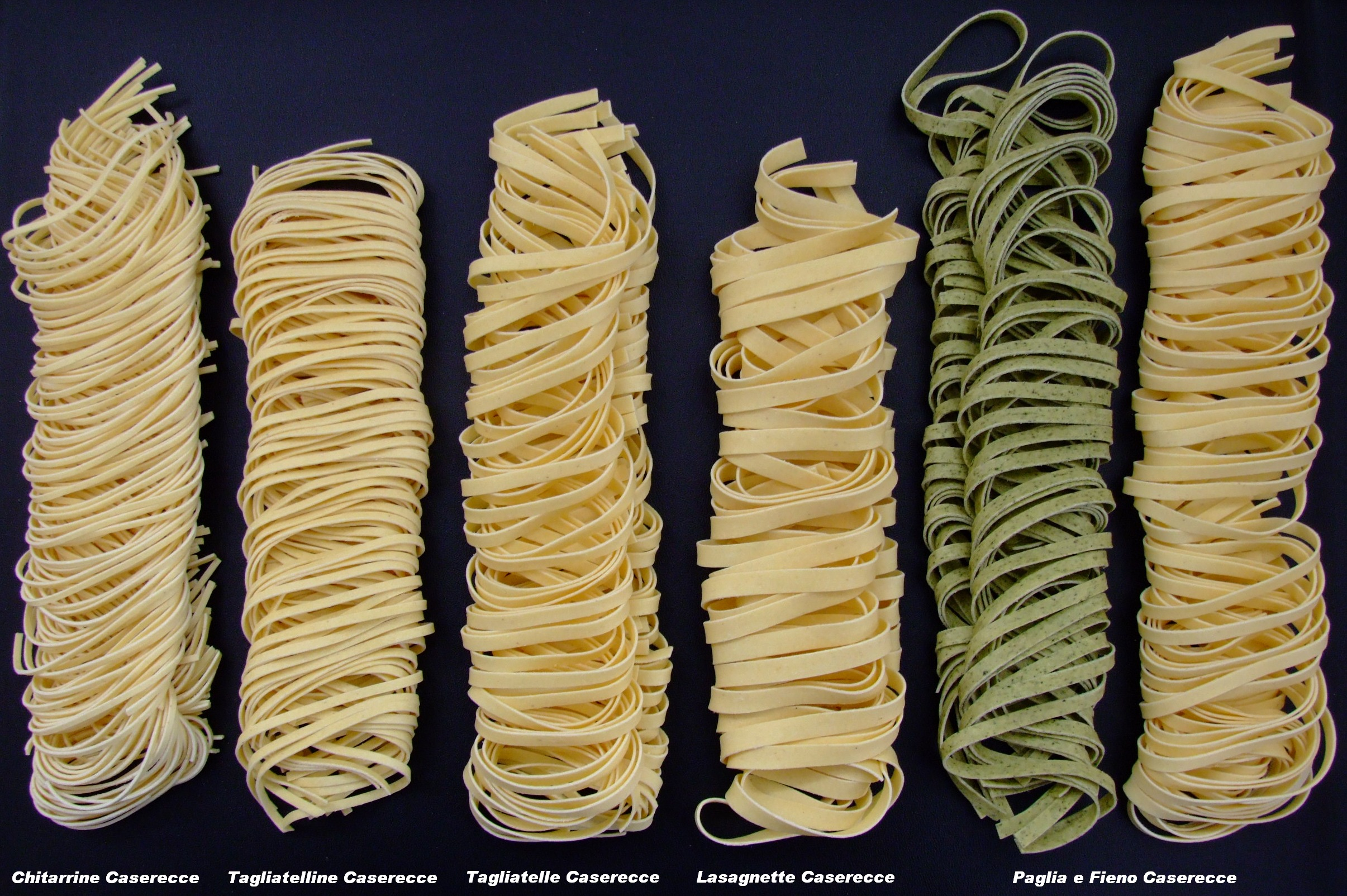
Fresh pasta

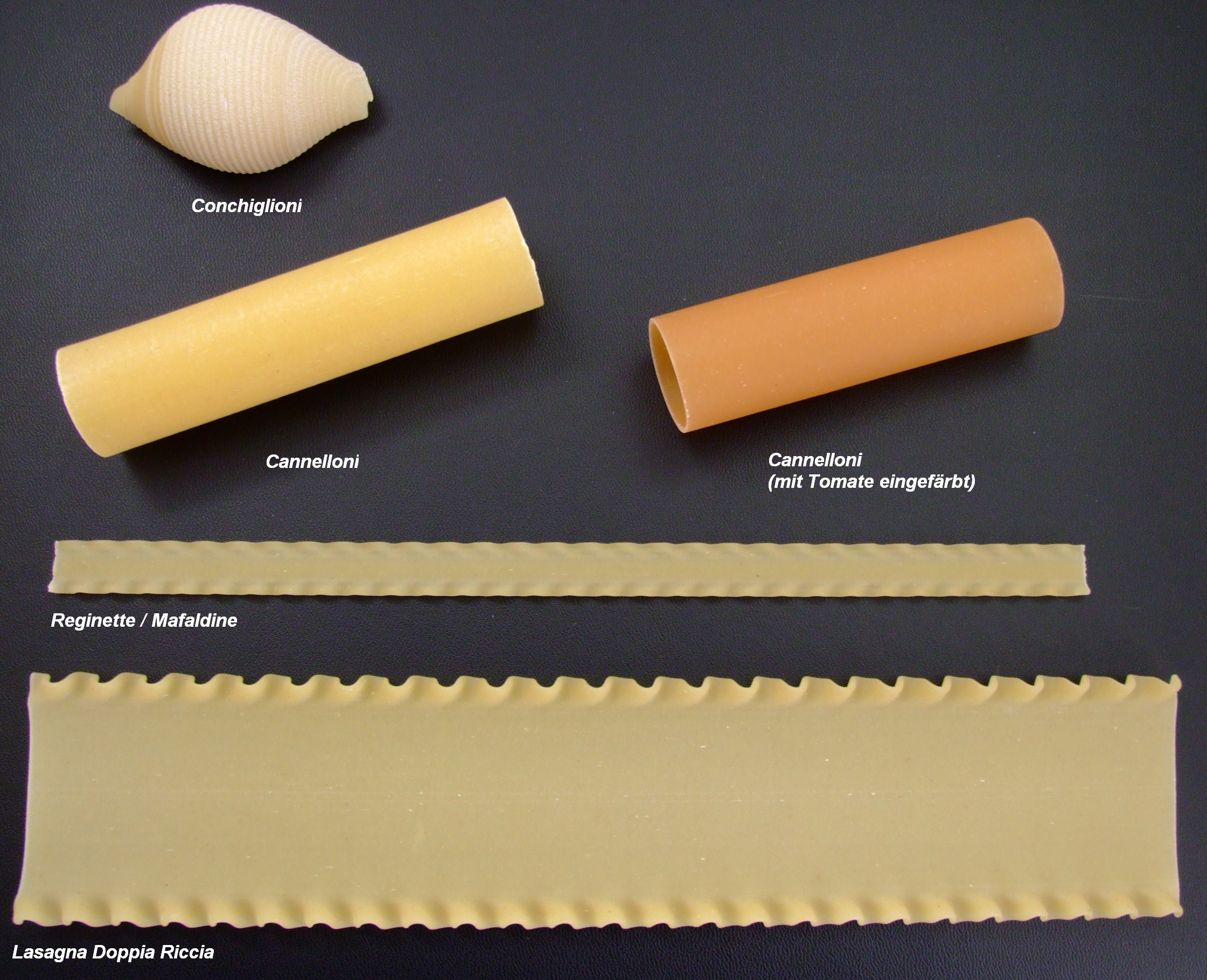
Pasta for pasta al forno (lit. 'baked pasta') dishes

=== Fresh ===
Fresh pasta is usually locally made with fresh ingredients unless it is destined to be shipped, in which case consideration is given to the spoilage rates of the desired ingredients such as eggs or herbs. Furthermore, fresh pasta is usually made with a mixture of eggs and all-purpose flour or "00" low-gluten flour. Since it contains eggs, it is more tender compared to dried pasta and only takes about half the time to cook. Delicate sauces are preferred for fresh pasta in order to let the pasta take front stage.

Fresh pastas do not expand in size after cooking; therefore, 0.7 kg (1.5 lb) of pasta are needed to serve four people generously. Fresh egg pasta is generally cut into strands of various widths and thicknesses depending on which pasta is to be made (e.g., fettuccine, pappardelle and lasagne). It is best served with meat, cheese or vegetables to create filled pastas such as ravioli, tortellini and cannelloni. Fresh egg pasta is well known in the Piedmont and Emilia-Romagna regions of northern Italy. In this area, dough is only made out of egg yolk and flour resulting in a very refined flavor and texture. This pasta is often served simply with butter sauce and thinly sliced truffles that are native to this region. In other areas, such as Apulia, fresh pasta can be made without eggs. The only ingredients needed to make the pasta dough are semolina flour and water, which is often shaped into orecchiette or cavatelli. Fresh pasta for cavatelli is also popular in other places including Sicily. However, the dough is prepared differently: it is made of flour and ricotta cheese instead.

=== Dried ===
Dried pasta can also be defined as factory-made pasta because it is usually produced in large amounts that require large machines with superior processing capabilities to manufacture. Dried pasta can be shipped farther and has a longer shelf life. The ingredients required to make dried pasta include semolina flour and water. Eggs can be added for flavor and richness, but are not needed to make dried pasta. In contrast to fresh pasta, dried pasta needs to be dried at a low temperature for several days to evaporate all the moisture allowing it to be stored for a longer period. Dried pastas are best served in hearty dishes, such as ragù sauces, soups and casseroles. Once it is cooked, the dried pasta will usually grow to twice its original size. Therefore, approximately 0.5 kg (1 lb) of dried pasta serves up to four people.

== Culinary uses ==
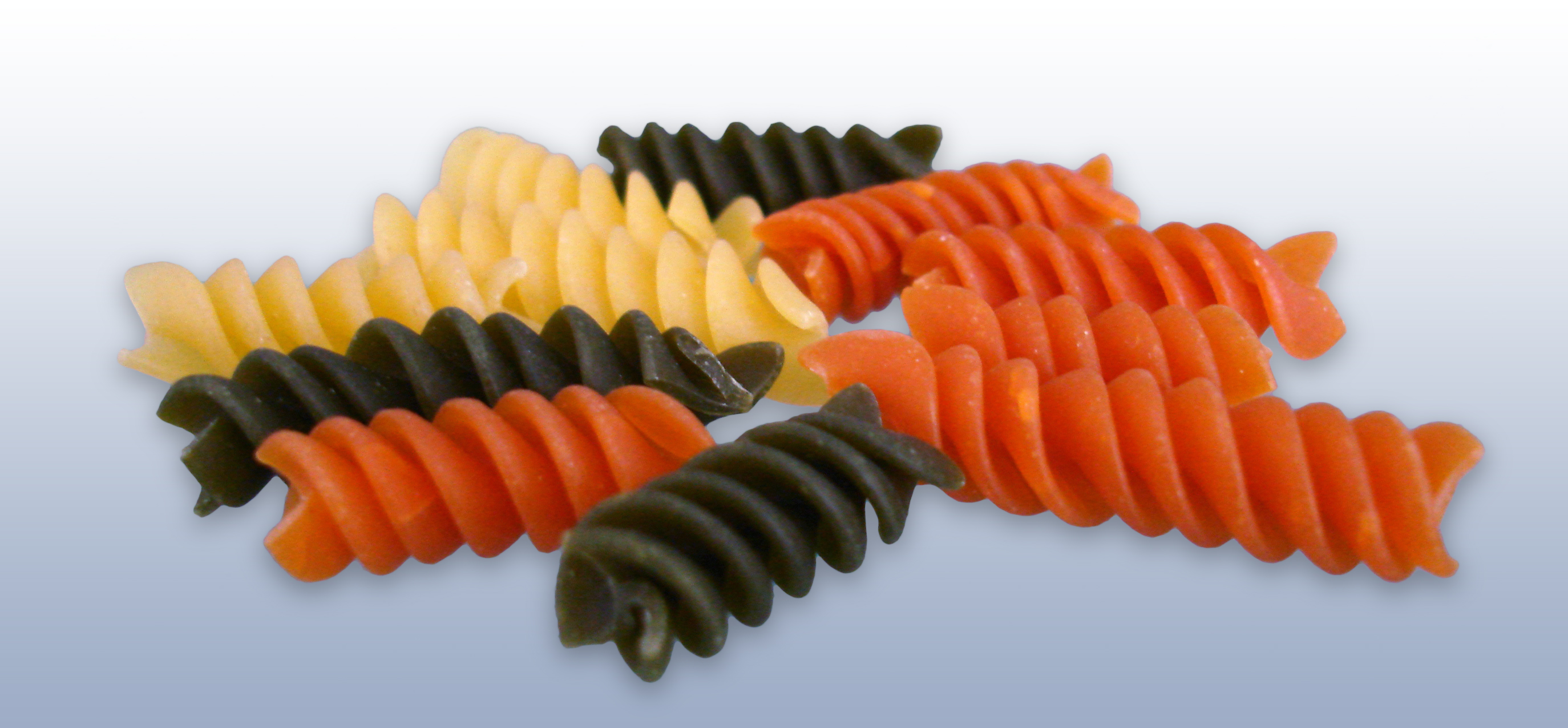
Three different colors of fusilli

=== Cooking ===
Pasta, whether dry or fresh, is eaten after cooking it in hot water. For Italian pasta, which is unsalted, salt is added to the cooking water. This is not the case for Asian wheat noodles, such as udon and lo mein, both of which are made from salty dough.

In Italy, pasta is often cooked to be al dente, such that it is still firm to the bite. This is because it is then often cooked in the sauce for a short time, which makes it soften further.

There are a number of urban myths about how pasta should be cooked. In fact, it does not generally matter whether pasta is cooked at a lower or a higher temperature, although lower temperatures require more stirring to avoid sticking, and certain stuffed pasta, such as tortellini, break up in higher temperatures. It also does not matter whether salt is added before or after bringing the water to a boil. The amount of salt has no influence on cooking speed.

Common ingredients to cook Italian pasta with include tomatoes, cheese and olive oil.

=== Sauce ===
Pasta is generally served with some type of sauce; the sauce and the type of pasta are usually matched based on consistency and ease of eating. However, Italian cuisine is best identified by individual regions. Northern Italian cooking uses less tomato, garlic and herbs, and béchamel sauce is more common. Thus, pasta dishes with lighter use of tomato are found in Trentino-Alto Adige and Emilia-Romagna regions of northern Italy. In Bologna, the meat-based Bolognese sauce incorporates a small amount of tomato concentrate and a green sauce called pesto originates from Genoa. In central Italy, there are sauces such as tomato sauce, amatriciana, arrabbiata and carbonara.

Tomato sauces are also present in southern Italian cuisine, where they originated. In southern Italy more complex variations include pasta paired with fresh vegetables, olives, capers or seafood. Varieties include pasta alla Norma, pasta con i peperoni cruschi, pasta con le sarde, spaghetti aglio, olio e peperoncino (lit. 'spaghetti with garlic, [olive] oil and peperoncino') and spaghetti alla puttanesca.

Pasta can be served also in broth (pastina, or stuffed pasta, such as tortellini, cappelletti and agnolini) or in vegetable soup, typically minestrone or bean soup (pasta e fagioli).

== Processing ==
=== Fresh ===
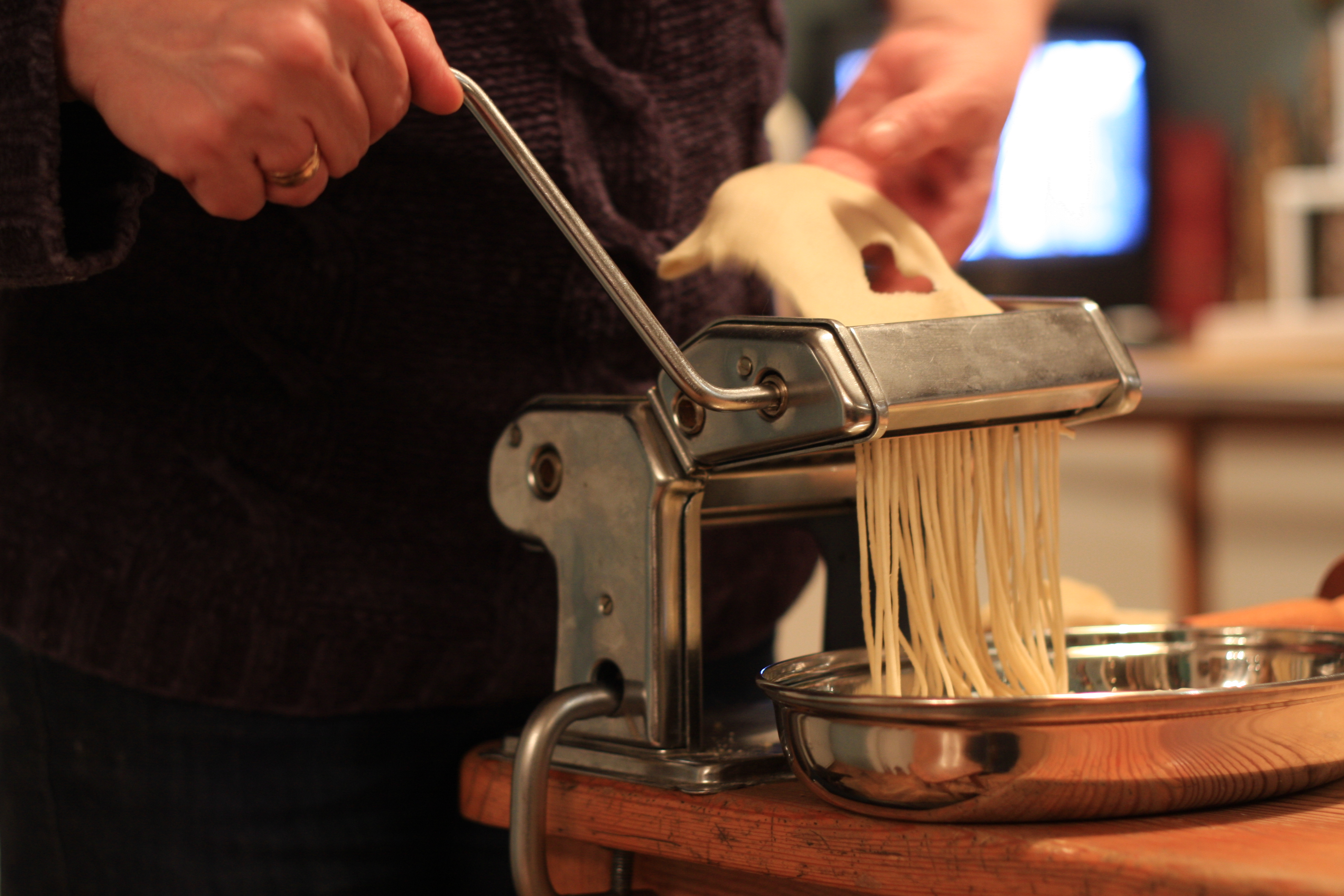
A pasta machine in use

Ingredients to make pasta dough include semolina flour, egg, salt and water. Flour is first mounded on a flat surface and then a well in the pile of flour is created. Egg is then poured into the well and a fork is used to mix the egg and flour. There are a variety of ways to shape the sheets of pasta depending on the type required. The most popular types include penne, spaghetti and macaroni.

Kitchen pasta machines, also called pasta makers, are popular with cooks who make large amounts of fresh pasta. The cook feeds sheets of pasta dough into the machine by hand and, by turning a hand crank, rolls the pasta to thin it incrementally. On the final pass through the pasta machine, the pasta may be directed through a machine 'comb' to shape of the pasta as it emerges.

=== Matrix and extrusion ===
Semolina flour consists of a protein matrix with entrapped starch granules. Upon the addition of water, during mixing, intermolecular forces allow the protein to form a more ordered structure in preparation for cooking.

Durum wheat is ground into semolina flour which is sorted by optical scanners and cleaned. Pipes allow the flour to move to a mixing machine where it is mixed with warm water by rotating blades. When the mixture is of a lumpy consistency, the mixture is pressed into sheets or extruded. Varieties of pasta such as spaghetti and linguine are cut by rotating blades, while pasta such as penne and fusilli are extruded. The size and shape of the dies in the extruder through which the pasta is pushed determine the shape that results. The pasta is then dried at a high temperature.

=== Factory-manufactured ===
The ingredients to make dried pasta usually include water and semolina flour; egg for color and richness (in some types of pasta), and possibly vegetable juice (such as spinach, beet, tomato, carrot), herbs or spices for color and flavor. After mixing semolina flour with warm water the dough is kneaded mechanically until it becomes firm and dry. If pasta is to be flavored, eggs, vegetable juices and herbs are added at this stage. The dough is then passed into the laminator to be flattened into sheets, then compressed by a vacuum mixer-machine to clear out air bubbles and excess water from the dough until the moisture content is reduced to 12%. Next, the dough is processed in a steamer to kill any bacteria it may contain.

The dough is then ready to be shaped into different types of pasta. Depending on the type of pasta to be made, the dough can either be cut or extruded through dies. The pasta is set in a drying tank under specific conditions of heat, moisture and time depending on the type of pasta. The dried pasta is then packaged: fresh pasta is sealed in a clear, airtight plastic container with a mixture of carbon dioxide and nitrogen that inhibits microbial growth and prolongs the product's shelf life; dried pastas are sealed in clear plastic or cardboard packages.

=== Gluten-free ===
Gluten, the protein found in grains such as wheat, rye, spelt and barley, contributes to protein aggregation and firm texture of a normally cooked pasta. Gluten-free pasta is produced with wheat flour substitutes, such as vegetable powders, rice, corn, quinoa, amaranth, oats and buckwheat flours. Other possible gluten-free pasta ingredients may include hydrocolloids to improve cooking pasta with high heat resistance, xanthan gum to retain moisture during storage, or hydrothermally-treated polysaccharide mixtures to produce textures similar to those of wheat pasta.

=== Storage ===
The storage of pasta depends on its processing and extent of drying. Uncooked pasta is kept dry and can sit in the cupboard for a year if airtight and stored in a cool, dry area. Cooked pasta is stored in the refrigerator for a maximum of five days in an airtight container. Adding a couple teaspoons of oil helps keep the food from sticking to itself and the container. Cooked pasta may be frozen for up to two or three months. Should the pasta be dried completely, it can be placed back in the cupboard.

== Science ==
=== Molecular and physical composition ===
Pasta exhibits a random molecular order rather than a crystalline structure. The moisture content of dried pasta is typically around 12%, indicating that dried pasta will remain a brittle solid until it is cooked and becomes malleable. The cooked product is, as a result, softer, more flexible and chewy.

Semolina flour is the ground endosperm of durum wheat, producing granules that absorb water during heating and an increase in viscosity due to semi-reordering of starch molecules.

Another major component of durum wheat is protein which plays a large role in pasta dough rheology. Gluten proteins, which include monomeric gliadins and polymeric glutenin, make up the major protein component of durum wheat (about 75–80%). As more water is added and shear stress is applied, gluten proteins take on an elastic characteristic and begin to form strands and sheets. The gluten matrix that results during forming of the dough becomes irreversibly associated during drying as the moisture content is lowered to form the dried pasta product.

=== Impact of processing on physical structure ===
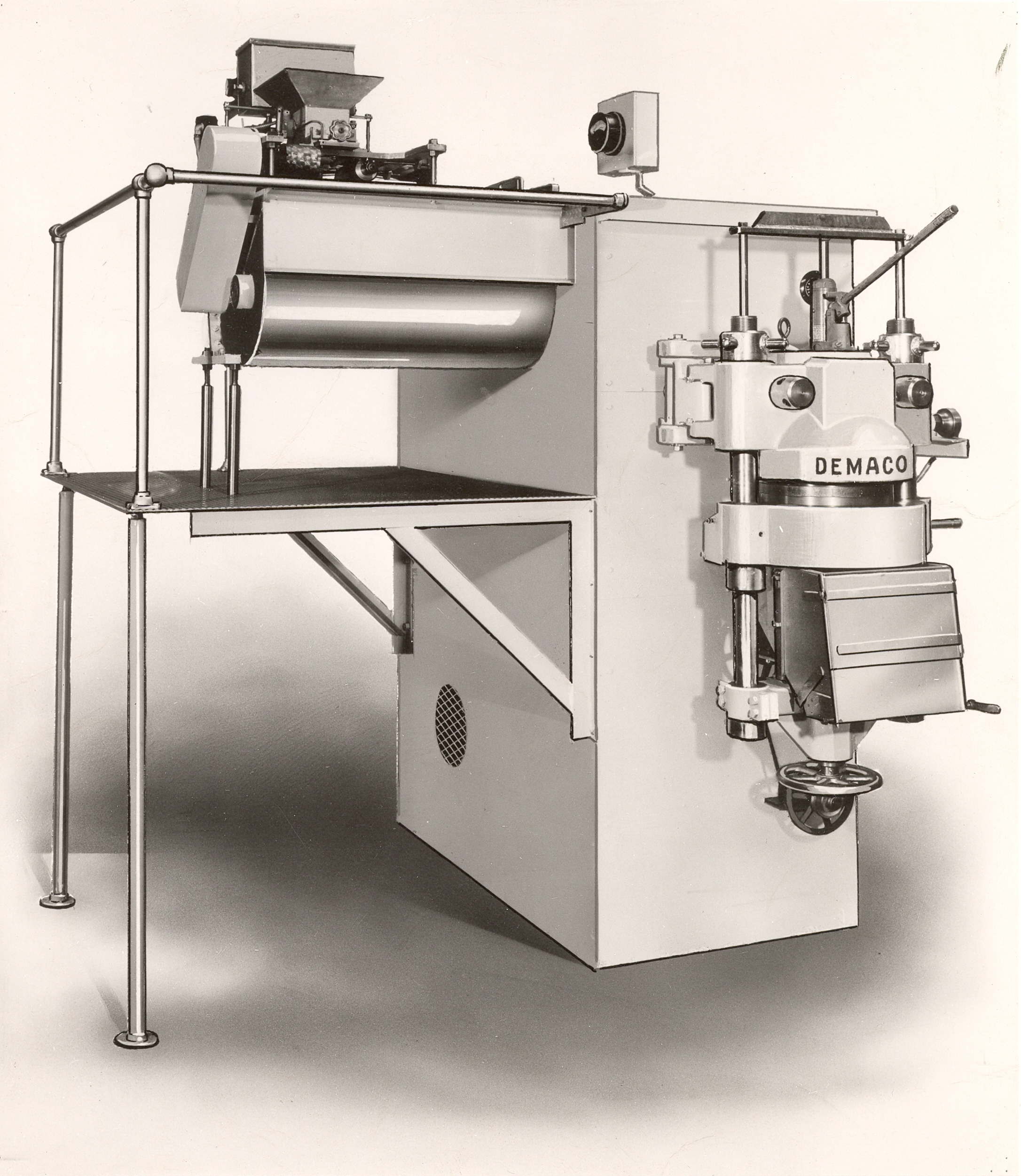
Early industrial pasta extruder with mixer, extrusion unit, head holding die in place and cutter below the die

Before the mixing process takes place, semolina particles are irregularly shaped and present in different sizes. Semolina particles become hydrated during mixing. The amount of water added to the semolina is determined based on the initial moisture content of the flour and the desired shape of the pasta. The desired moisture content of the dough is around 32% wet basis and will vary depending on the shape of pasta being produced.

The forming process involves the dough entering an extruder in which the rotation of a single or double screw system pushes the dough toward a die set to a specific shape. As the starch granules swell slightly in the presence of water and a low amount of thermal energy, they become embedded within the protein matrix and align along the direction of the shear caused by the extrusion process.

=== Chemical and physical changes upon cooking ===
Starch gelatinization and protein coagulation are the major changes that take place when pasta is cooked in boiling water. The hotter the water, the quicker the diffusion of water into the pasta, after which starch gelatinization can occur as long as the water is above 60 °C. Additionally, protein in the pasta such as gluten can denature and coagulate above ~70 - 80 °C. Protein and starch competing for water within the pasta cause a constant change in structure as the pasta cooks. The absorption of water into starch granules causes them to swell in size and become soft, ultimately allowing some starch to exit the granules and dissolve into the cooking water.

== Production and market ==
In 2015–16, the largest producers of dried pasta were Italy (3.2 million tonnes), the United States (2 million tonnes), Turkey (1.3 million tonnes), Brazil (1.2 million tonnes) and Russia (1 million tonnes). In 2018, Italy was the world's largest exporter of pasta, with $2.9 billion sold, followed by China with $0.9 billion.

The largest per capita consumers of pasta in 2015 were Italy (23.5 kg/person), Tunisia (16.0 kg/person), Venezuela (12.0 kg/person) and Greece (11.2 kg/person). In 2017, the United States was the largest consumer of pasta with 2.7 million tons.

== Nutrition ==
Pasta, cooked, unenriched, without salt
Nutritional value per 100 g (3.5 oz)
- Energy: 660 kJ (160 kcal)
- Carbohydrates: 30.9 g
- Starch: 26.0 g
- Sugars: 0.6 g
- Dietary fiber: 1.8 g
- Fat: 0.9 g
- Protein: 5.8 g
Vitamins and minerals
| Vitamins | Quantity %DV^{†} |
| Thiamine (B1) | 2% 0.02 mg |
| Riboflavin (B2) | 2% 0.02 mg |
| Niacin (B3) | 3% 0.4 mg |
| Pantothenic acid (B5) | 2% 0.11 mg |
| Vitamin B6 | 3% 0.05 mg |
| Folate (B9) | 2% 7 μg |
| Vitamin C | 0% 0 mg |
| Vitamin E | 0% 0.06 mg |
| Minerals | Quantity %DV^{†} |
| Calcium | 1% 7 mg |
| Iron | 3% 0.5 mg |
| Magnesium | 4% 18 mg |
| Manganese | 14% 0.32 mg |
| Phosphorus | 5% 58 mg |
| Potassium | 1% 44 mg |
| Sodium | 0% 1 mg |
| Zinc | 5% 0.5 mg |
- Other constituents: Quantity
- Water: 62 g
- Link to USDA Database entry
- ^{†}Percentages estimated using US recommendations for adults, except for potassium, which is estimated based on expert recommendation from the National Academies.

When cooked, plain pasta is composed of 62% water, 31% carbohydrates (26% starch), 6% protein and 1% fat. A 100-gram (3 1/2 oz) portion of unenriched cooked pasta provides 670 kilojoules (160 kcal) of food energy and a moderate level of manganese (15% of the Daily Value), but few other micronutrients.

Pasta generally has low micronutrient content and may be enriched, fortified, or made from whole grains.

Pasta has a lower glycemic index than many other staple foods in Western culture, such as bread, potatoes and rice.

== International adaptations ==
As pasta was introduced elsewhere in the world, it became incorporated into a number of local cuisines, which often have significantly different ways of preparation from those of Italy. When pasta was introduced to different nations, each culture would adopt a different style of preparation. In the past, ancient Romans cooked pasta-like foods by frying rather than boiling. It was also sweetened with honey or tossed with garum.

=== Africa ===
Pasta is widespread in Tunisia; the country is its second largest consumer per capita. Italian Tunisians, mostly from Sicily, brought various pasta specialties with them during their migration in the 19th and 20th centuries. The dish, easy and fast to make, was quickly adopted and adapted into the local cuisine. Tunisian-style pasta, referred to as Makrouna, is always prepared with concentrated tomato paste as the main base. Commonly used ingredients include olive oil, garlic, salt, red pepper flakes, chili powder, and sometimes tabil and harissa. It is eaten with chicken meat, beef, lamb, seafood, or merguez, cooked with the spicy sauce. Used pasta varieties include ditalini (referred to as fell), macaroni, spaghetti and penne among others. Chili peppers and parsley are commonly added on top of the dish.

Countries such as Somalia, Ethiopia and Eritrea were introduced to pasta from colonization and occupation through the Italian Empire, in the 19th and 20th centuries. Southern Somalia has a dish called suugo which has a meat sauce, typically beef based, with their local xawaash spice mix. In Ethiopia, pasta can also be served over injera, where it is also eaten with hands instead of cutlery. A dollop of bolognese with berbere spice blend can be served on the side.

=== Asia ===
In Hong Kong, the local Chinese have adopted pasta, primarily spaghetti and macaroni, as an ingredient in the Hong Kong–style Western cuisine. In cha chaan teng, macaroni is cooked in water and served in broth with ham or frankfurter sausages, peas, black mushrooms and optionally eggs, reminiscent of noodle soup dishes. This is often a course for breakfast or light lunch fare.

In Nepal, macaroni has been adapted to local tastes, with boiled macaroni sautéed with cumin, turmeric, finely chopped green chillies, onions and other vegetables.

=== Europe ===
In Armenia, a popular traditional pasta called arishta is first dry pan toasted so as slightly golden, and then boiled to make the pasta dish which is often topped with yogurt, butter and garlic.

Twice a year, hundreds of people in Sardinia make a nighttime 20-mile (32 km) pilgrimage from the city of Nuoro to the village of Lula for the biannual Feast of San Francesco, where they eat what is possibly the world's rarest pasta. Su filindeu (lit. 'threads of God' in the Sardinian language) is an incredibly intricate semolina pasta made by just three women who only make the pasta for the festival.

=== South America ===
Pasta is also widespread in the Southern Cone, as well as most of the rest of Brazil, being mostly pervasive in the areas with mild to strong Italian roots, such as Central Argentina, and the eight southernmost Brazilian states (where macaroni is called macarrão, and more general pasta is known under the umbrella term massa (lit. 'dough'), together with some Japanese noodles, such as bifum rice vermicelli and yakisoba, which also entered general taste). The local names for the pasta are many times varieties of the Italian names, such as ñoquis/nhoque for gnocchi, ravioles/ravióli for ravioli or tallarines/talharim for tagliatelle, although some of the most popular pasta in Brazil, such as the parafuso ('screw', 'bolt'), a specialty of the country's pasta salads, are also different both in name and format from its closest Italian relatives, in this case the fusilli.

=== North America ===
In the United States, fettuccine Alfredo is a popular Italian-style dish.

=== Oceania ===
In Australia, boscaiola sauce, based on bacon and mushrooms, is popular.

== Regulations ==
=== Italy ===
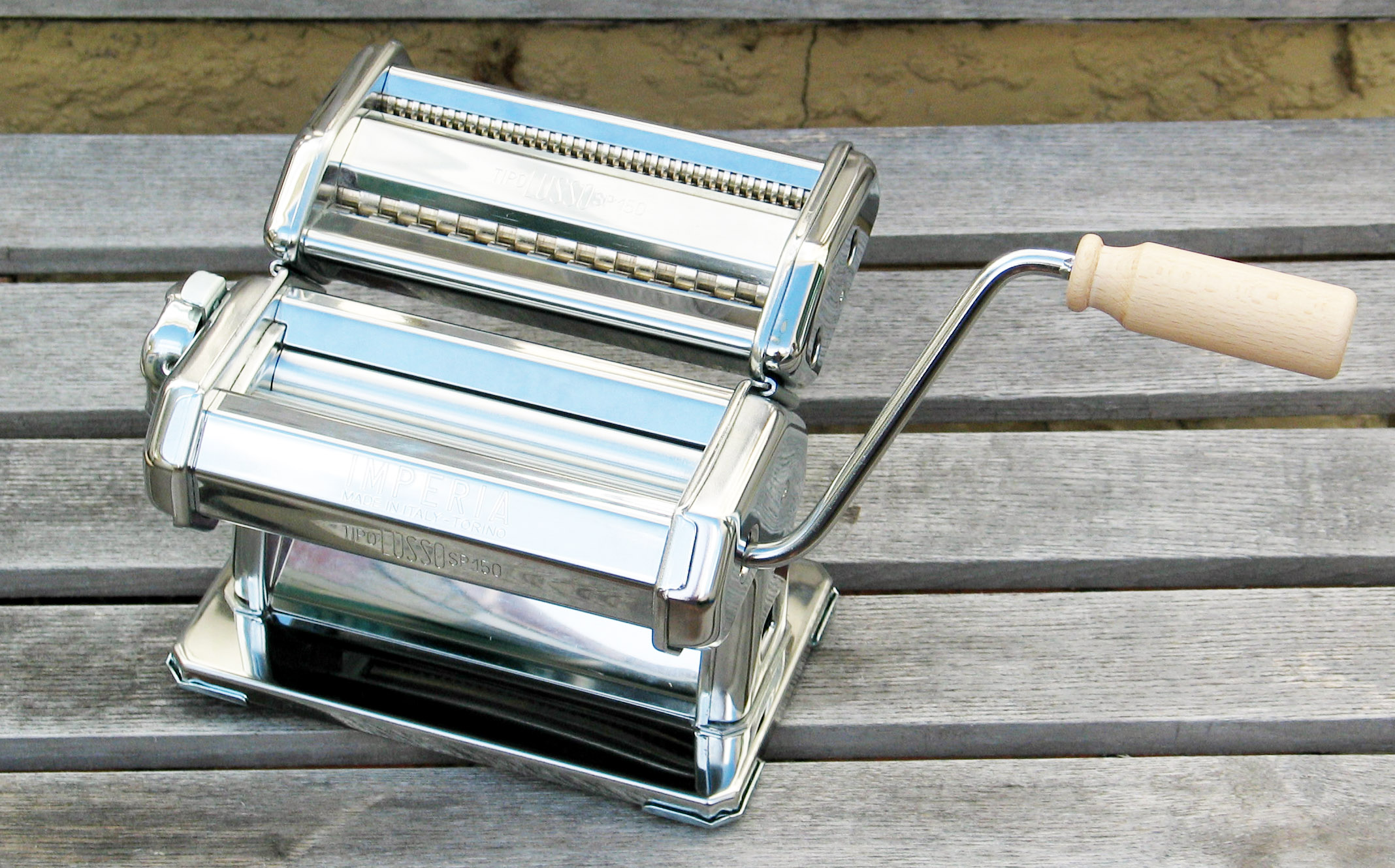
A small hand-cranked pasta machine, designed to sheet fresh pasta dough and cut tagliatelle

Although numerous variations of ingredients for different pasta products are known, in Italy the commercial manufacturing and labeling of pasta for sale as a food product within the country is highly regulated. Italian regulations recognize three categories of commercially manufactured dried pasta as well as manufactured fresh and stabilized pasta:

- Pasta, or dried pasta with three subcategories – (i.) durum wheat semolina pasta (pasta di semola di grano duro), (ii.) Low grade durum wheat semolina pasta (pasta di semolato di grano duro) and (iii.) Durum wheat whole meal pasta (pasta di semola integrale di grano duro). Pastas made under this category must be made only with durum wheat semolina or durum wheat whole-meal semolina and water, with an allowance for up to 3% of soft-wheat flour as part of the durum flour. Dried pastas made under this category must be labeled according to the subcategory.
- Special pastas (paste speciali) – as with the pasta above, with additional ingredients other than flour and water or eggs. Special pastas must be labeled as durum wheat semolina pasta on the packaging completed by mentioning the added ingredients used (e.g., spinach). The 3% soft flour limitation still applies.
- Egg pasta (pasta all'uovo) – may only be manufactured using durum wheat semolina with at least 4 hens' eggs (chicken) weighing at least 200 grams (7.1 oz) (without the shells) per kilogram of semolina, or a liquid egg product produced only with hen's eggs. Pasta made and sold in Italy under this category must be labeled egg pasta.
- Fresh and stabilized pastas (paste alimentari fresche e stabilizzate) – includes fresh and stabilized pastas, which may be made with soft-wheat flour without restriction on the amount. Prepackaged fresh pasta must have a water content not less than 24%, must be stored refrigerated at a temperature of not more than 4 °C (39 °F) (with a 2 °C (36 °F) tolerance), must have undergone a heat treatment at least equivalent to pasteurisation, and must be sold within five days of the date of manufacture. Stabilized pasta has a lower allowed water content of 20%, and is manufactured using a process and heat treatment that allows it to be transported and stored at ambient temperatures.

The Italian regulations under Presidential Decree No. 187 apply only to the commercial manufacturing of pastas both made and sold within Italy. They are not applicable either to pasta made for export from Italy or to pastas imported into Italy from other countries. They also do not apply to pastas made in restaurants.

=== United States ===
In the US, regulations for commercial pasta products occur both at the federal and state levels. At the Federal level, consistent with Section 341 of the Federal Food, Drug, and Cosmetic Act, the Food and Drug Administration (FDA) has defined standards of identity for what are broadly termed macaroni products. These standards appear in 21 CFR Part 139. Those regulations state the requirements for standardized macaroni products of 15 specific types of dried pastas, including the ingredients and product-specific labeling for conforming products sold in the US, including imports:

- Macaroni products – defined as the class of food prepared by drying formed units of dough made from semolina, durum flour, farina, flour or any combination of those ingredients with water. Within this category various optional ingredients may also be used within specified ranges, including egg white, frozen egg white or dried egg white alone or in any combination; disodium phosphate; onions, celery, garlic or bay leaf, alone or in any combination; salt; gum gluten; and concentrated glyceryl monostearate. Specific dimensions are given for the shapes named macaroni, spaghetti and vermicelli.
  - Enriched macaroni products – largely the same as macaroni products except that each such food must contain thiamin, riboflavin, niacin or niacinamide, folic acid and iron, with specified limits. Additional optional ingredients that may be added include vitamin D, calcium and defatted wheat germ. The optional ingredients specified may be supplied through the use of dried yeast, dried torula yeast, partly defatted wheat germ, enriched farina or enriched flour.
  - Enriched macaroni products with fortified protein – similar to enriched macaroni products with the addition of other ingredients to meet specific protein requirements. Edible protein sources that may be used include food grade flours or meals from nonwheat cereals or oilseeds. Products in this category must include specified amounts of thiamin, riboflavin, niacin or niacinamide and iron, but not folic acid. The products in this category may also optionally contain up to 625 milligrams (9.65 gr) of calcium.
  - Milk macaroni products – the same as macaroni products except that milk or a specified milk product is used as the sole moistening ingredient in preparing the dough. Other than milk, allowed milk products include concentrated milk, evaporated milk, dried milk and a mixture of butter with skim, concentrated skim, evaporated skim or nonfat dry milk, in any combination, with the limitation on the amount of milk solids relative to amount of milk fat.
  - Nonfat milk macaroni products – the same as macaroni products except that nonfat dry milk or concentrated skim milk is used in preparing the dough. The finished macaroni product must contain between 12% and 25% milk solids-not-fat. Carageenan or carageenan salts may be added in specified amounts. The use of egg whites, disodium phosphate and gum gluten optionally allowed for macaroni products is not permitted for this category.
    - Enriched nonfat milk macaroni products – similar to nonfat milk macaroni products with added requirements that products in this category contain thiamin, riboflavin, niacin or niacinamide, folic acid and iron, all within specified ranges.
  - Vegetable macaroni products – macaroni products except that tomato (of any red variety), artichoke, beet, carrot, parsley or spinach is added in a quantity such that the solids of the added component are at least 3% by weight of the finished macaroni product. The vegetable additions may be in the form of fresh, canned, dried or a puree or paste. The addition of either the various forms of egg whites or disodium phosphate allowed for macaroni products is not permitted in this category.
    - Enriched vegetable macaroni products – the same as vegetable macaroni products with the added requirement for nutrient content specified for enriched macaroni products.
  - Whole wheat macaroni products – similar to macaroni products except that only whole wheat flour or whole durum wheat flour, or both, may be used as the wheat ingredient. Further the addition of the various forms of egg whites, disodium phosphate and gum gluten are not permitted.
  - Wheat and soy macaroni products – begins as macaroni products with the addition of at least 12.5% of soy flour as a fraction of the total soy and wheat flour used. The addition the various forms of egg whites and disodium phosphate are not permitted. Gum gluten may be added with a limitation that the total protein content derived from the combination of the flours and added gluten not exceed 13%.

==== State mandates ====
The federal regulations under 21 CFR Part 139 are standards for the products noted, not mandates. Following the FDA's standards, a number of states have, at various times, enacted their own statutes that serve as mandates for various forms of macaroni and noodle products that may be produced or sold within their borders. Many of these specifically require that the products sold within those states be of the enriched form. According to a report released by the Connecticut Office of Legislative Research, when Connecticut's law was adopted in 1972 that mandated certain grain products, including macaroni products, sold within the state to be enriched it joined 38 to 40 other states in adopting the federal standards as mandates.

==== USDA school nutrition ====
Beyond the FDA's standards and state statutes, the United States Department of Agriculture (USDA), which regulates federal school nutrition programs, broadly requires grain and bread products served under these programs either be enriched or whole grain (see 7 CFR 210.10 (k) (5)). This includes macaroni and noodle products that are served as part the category grains/breads requirements within those programs. The USDA also allows that enriched macaroni products fortified with protein may be used and counted to meet either a grains/breads or meat/alternative meat requirement, but not as both components within the same meal.

== See also ==
- Al dente – cooking technique
- List of pasta
- List of pasta dishes
- National Pasta Association
- Noodles
- Chutagi
- Tteokbokki
