= Italian cuisine =

Culinary traditions of Italy

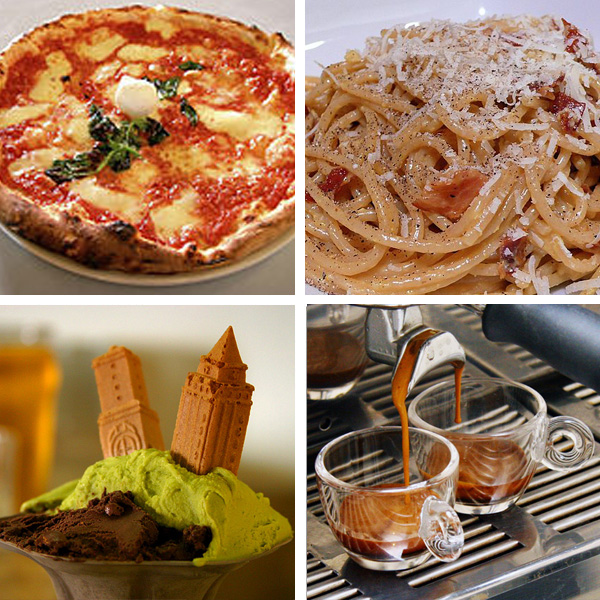
Clockwise from top left: Neapolitan pizza, carbonara, espresso, and gelato

Italian cuisine is a Mediterranean cuisine consisting of the ingredients, recipes and cooking techniques developed in Italy since Roman times, and later spread around the world together with waves of Italian diaspora. Significant changes occurred with the colonization of the Americas and the consequent introduction of potatoes, tomatoes, capsicums, and maize, as well as sugar beet—the latter introduced in quantity in the 18th century. Italian cuisine is one of the best-known and most widely appreciated worldwide. In 2025, Italian cuisine was listed as intangible cultural heritage by UNESCO.

The cuisine includes deeply rooted countrywide traditions as well as diverse regional dishes. Many dishes that were once regional have proliferated with variations throughout the country. Italian cuisine is one of the most popular and copied around the world. Italian cuisine has left a significant influence on several other cuisines around the world, particularly in East Africa, such as Italian Eritrean cuisine, and in the United States in the form of Italian-American cuisine.

A key characteristic of Italian cuisine is its simplicity, with many dishes made up of few ingredients, and therefore Italian cooks often rely on the quality of the ingredients, rather than the complexity of preparation. Italian cuisine generated an estimated €251 billion in global foodservice revenue in 2024, according to Deloitte. Over the centuries, many popular dishes and recipes have often been created by ordinary people more so than by chefs, which is why many Italian recipes are suitable for home and daily cooking, respecting regional specificities, privileging only raw materials and ingredients from the region of origin of the dish and preserving its seasonality.

The Mediterranean diet forms the basis of Italian cuisine, rich in pasta, fish, fruits, and vegetables. Cheese, cold cuts, and wine are central to Italian cuisine, and, along with pizza and coffee (especially espresso), form part of Italian gastronomic culture. Desserts have a long tradition of merging local flavours such as citrus fruits, pistachio, and almonds with sweet cheeses such as mascarpone and ricotta or exotic tastes as cocoa, vanilla, and cinnamon. Gelato, tiramisu, and cassata are among the most famous examples of Italian desserts, cakes, and patisserie. Italian cuisine relies heavily on traditional products; the country has a large number of traditional specialities protected under EU law. Italy is the world's largest producer of wine, as well as the country with the widest variety of indigenous grapevine varieties in the world.

== History ==
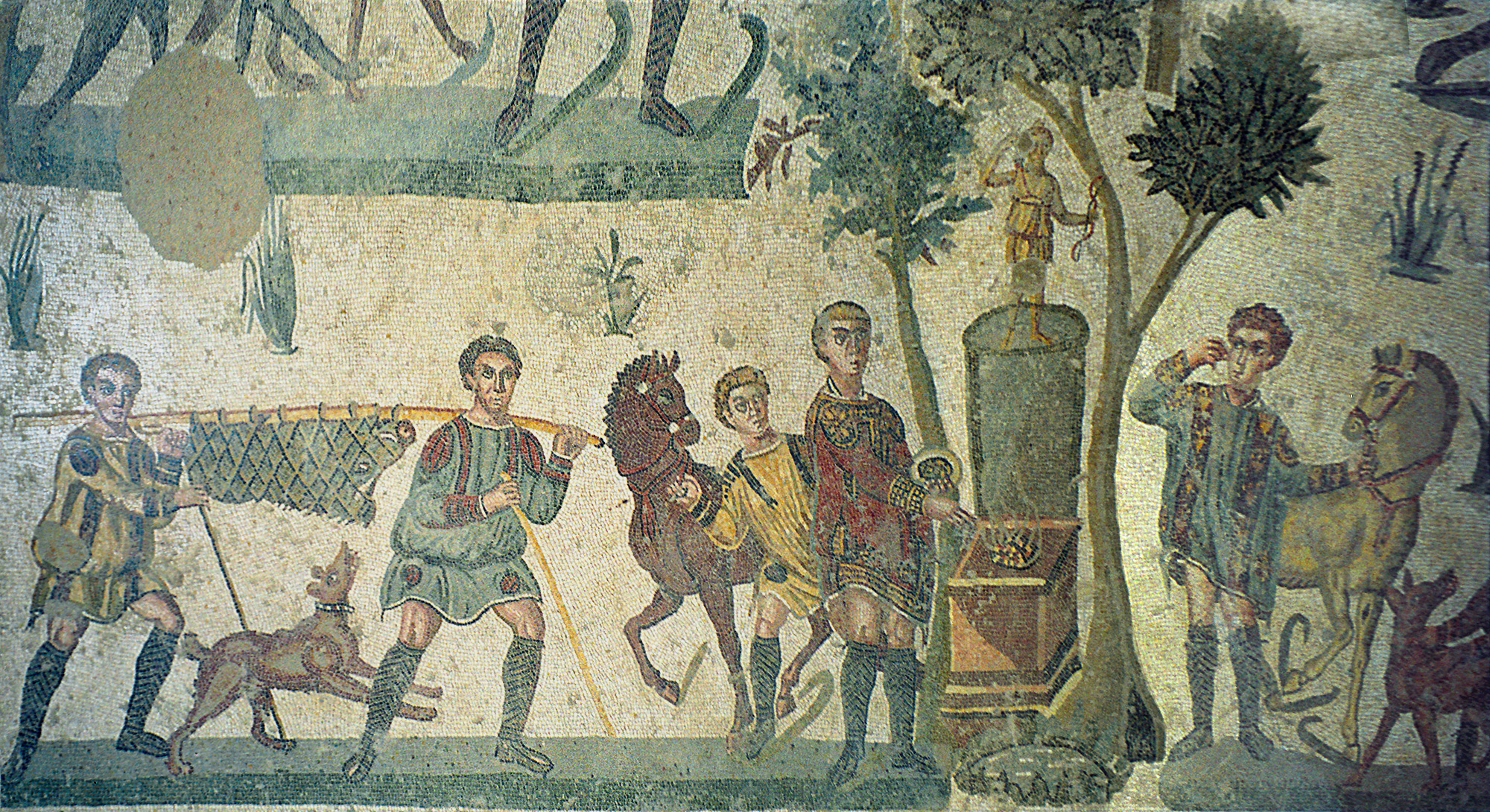
A Roman mosaic depicting a banquet during a hunting trip, from the Late Roman Villa Romana del Casale, Sicily

Italian cuisine has developed over the centuries. Although the country known as Italy did not unite until the 19th century, the cuisine can claim traceable roots as far back as the 4th century BC. The foundation of Italian cuisine dates back to ancient Rome, where elaborate preparations can be found documented in a cookbook (Apicius).

However, the fall of the Roman Empire significantly changed Italian cooking, when different cities began to separate and form their own traditions based on climate, local agriculture and trade connections. Through the centuries, neighbouring regions, conquerors, high-profile chefs, political upheaval, and the discovery of the New World have influenced its development. Many different types of bread and pasta were made, and there was a variation in cooking techniques and preparation.

Trade, the location on the Silk Road, and its routes to Asia also influenced the local development of special dishes. Due to the climatic conditions and the different proximity to the sea, different basic foods and spices were available from region to region. Regional cuisine is represented by some of the major cities in Italy. For example, Milan (in the north of Italy) is known for risottos, Trieste (in the northeast of Italy) is known for multicultural food, Bologna (in the centre of Italy) is known for its tortellini, and Naples (in the south of Italy) is famous for its pizzas. There is evidence of the Etruscans making pasta in Italy during the 4th century BC.

=== Antiquity ===
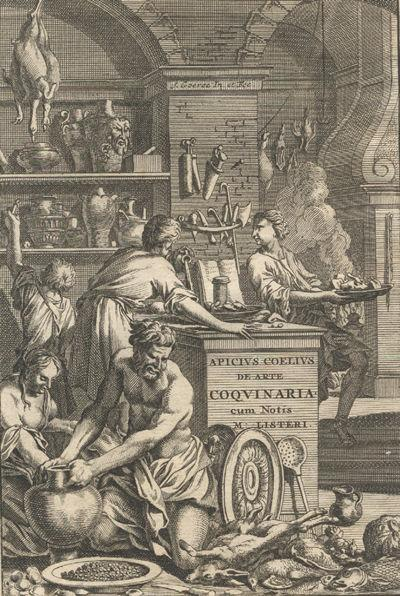
Apicius, De re coquinaria (On the Subject of Cooking), 1709 edition

The first known Italian food writer was a Greek Sicilian named Archestratus from Syracuse in the 4th century BC. He wrote a poem that spoke of using "top quality and seasonal" ingredients. He said that flavours should not be masked by spices, herbs or other seasonings. He placed importance on simple preparation of fish.

Simplicity was abandoned and replaced by a culture of gastronomy as the Roman Empire developed. By the time De re coquinaria was published in the 1st century AD, it contained 470 recipes calling for heavy use of spices and herbs. The Romans employed Greek bakers to produce breads and imported cheeses from Sicily, as the Sicilians had a reputation as the best cheesemakers. The Romans reared goats for butchering, and grew artichokes and leeks.

Some foods considered traditional were imported to Italy from foreign countries during the Roman era. This includes the jujube (Italian: giuggiole), which is celebrated as a regional cuisine in Arquà Petrarca. The Romans also imported cherries, apricots, and peaches.

=== Middle Ages ===
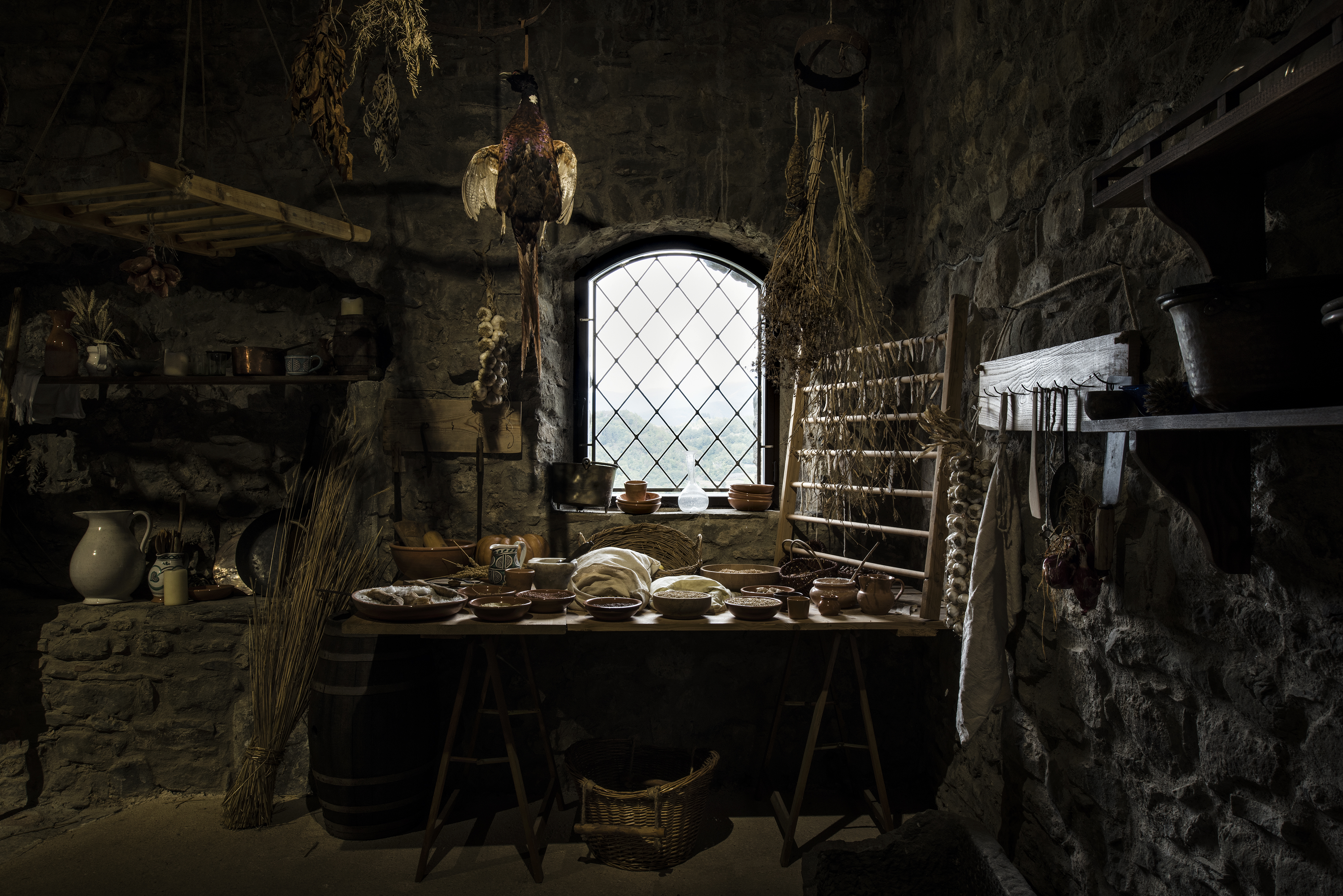
A restored medieval kitchen inside Verrucole Castle, Tuscany

Arabs conquered Sicily in the 9th century, introducing spinach, almonds, and rice. They also brought with them foods from foreign lands that are celebrated as traditional Italian foods: citrus fruits, artichokes, chickpeas, pistachios, sugarcane, aubergines, and durum wheat, which is used to make pasta. During the 12th century, a Norman king surveyed Sicily and saw people making long strings made from flour and water called atriya, which eventually became trii, a term still used for spaghetti in southern Italy. Normans also introduced the casserole, salted cod (Italian: baccalà), and stockfish, all of which remain popular.

Food preservation was either chemical or physical, as refrigeration did not exist. Meats and fish were smoked, dried or kept on ice. Brine and salt were used to pickle items such as herring, and to cure pork. Root vegetables were preserved in brine after they had been parboiled. Other means of preservation included oil, vinegar, or immersing meat in congealed, rendered fat. For preserving fruits, liquor, honey, and sugar were used.

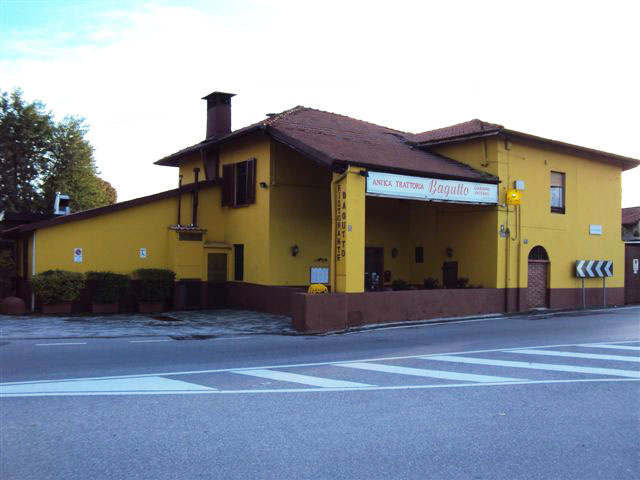
The oldest restaurant in Italy, Antica trattoria Bagutto in Milan, dates to at least 1284.

Milan is home to the oldest restaurant in Italy and the second in Europe, the Antica trattoria Bagutto, which has existed since at least 1284. The oldest Italian book on cuisine is the 13th century Liber de coquina (Cookbook) written in Naples. Dishes include "Roman-style" cabbage (ad usum romanorum), ad usum campanie which were "small leaves" prepared in the "Campanian manner", a bean dish from the Marca di Trevisio, a torta, compositum londardicum, dishes similar to dishes the modern day. Two other books from the 14th century include recipes for Roman pastello, Lasagna pie, and call for the use of salt from Sardinia or Chioggia.

In the 15th century, Maestro Martino was chef to the Patriarch of Aquileia at the Vatican. His Libro de arte coquinaria (Culinary art book) describes a more refined cuisine. His book contains a recipe for maccaroni siciliani, made by wrapping dough around a thin iron rod to dry in the sun. The macaroni was cooked in capon stock flavoured with saffron, displaying Persian influences. Martino noted the avoidance of excessive spices in favour of fresh herbs. The Roman recipes include coppiette (air-dried salami) and cabbage dishes. His Florentine dishes include eggs with torta bolognese, torta sienese and Genoese recipes such as piperata, macaroni, squash, mushrooms, and spinach pie with onions.

Martino's text was included in a 1475 book by Bartolomeo Platina printed in Venice entitled De honesta voluptate et valetudine (On Honest Pleasure and Good Health). Platina puts Martino's Libro in a regional context, writing about perch from Lake Maggiore, sardines from Lake Garda, grayling from Adda, hens from Padua, olives from Bologna and Piceno, turbot from Ravenna, rudd from Lake Trasimeno, carrots from Viterbo, bass from the Tiber, roviglioni and shad from Lake Albano, snails from Rieti, figs from Tuscolo, grapes from Narni, oil from Cassino, oranges from Naples, and eels from Campania. Grains from Lombardy and Campania are mentioned as is honey from Sicily and Taranto. Wine from the Ligurian coast, Greco from Tuscany and San Severino, and Trebbiano from Tuscany and Piceno are also mentioned in the book.

=== Early modern era ===
The courts of Florence, Rome, Venice, and Ferrara were central to the cuisine. Cristoforo di Messisbugo, steward to Ippolito d'Este, published Banchetti compositioni di vivande (Banquets Compositions of Food) in 1549. Messisbugo gives recipes for pies and tarts (containing 124 recipes with various fillings). The work emphasises the use of Eastern spices and sugar.

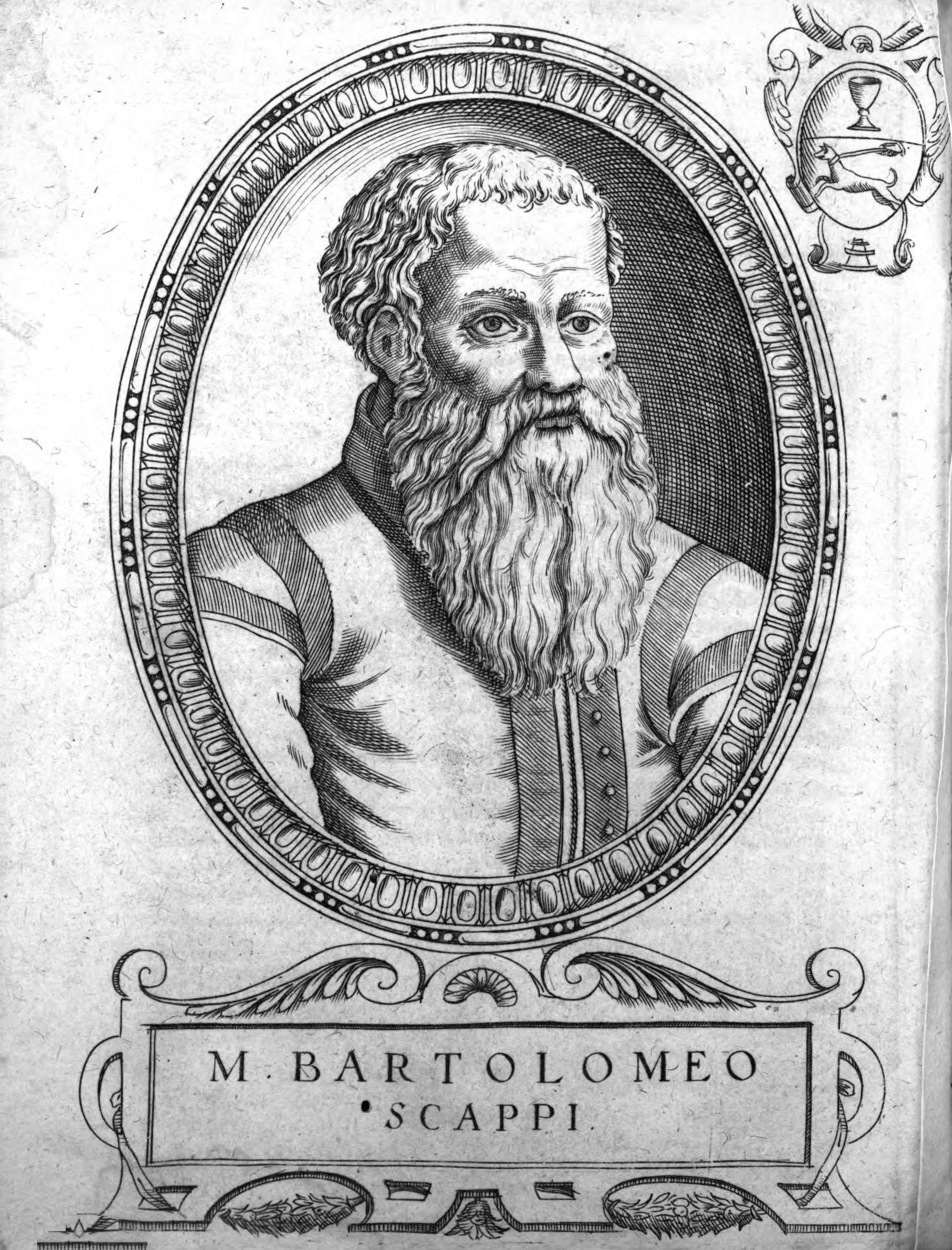
Bartolomeo Scappi, personal chef to Pope Pius V

In 1570, Bartolomeo Scappi, personal chef to Pope Pius V, wrote his Opera (Work) in five volumes, giving a comprehensive view of Italian cooking of that period. It contains over 1,000 recipes, with information on banquets including displays and menus as well as illustrations of kitchen and table utensils. This book differs from most books written for the royal courts in its preference for domestic animals and courtyard birds rather than game meat.

Recipes include lesser cuts of meats such as tongue, head, and shoulder. The third volume has recipes for fish in Lent. These fish recipes are simple, including poaching, broiling, grilling, and frying after marination.

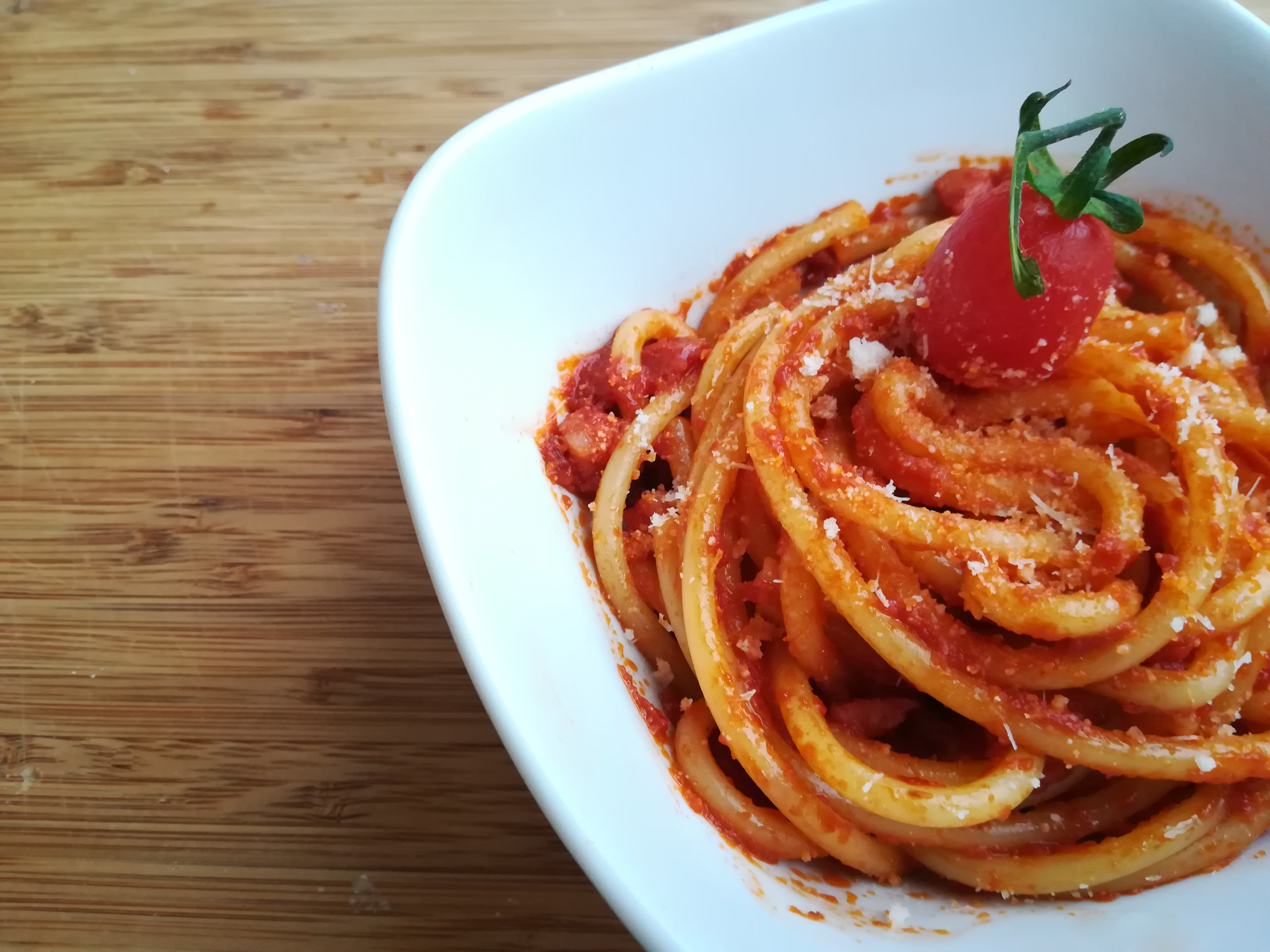
Bucatini with amatriciana sauce, which includes the New World vegetable tomato

Particular attention is given to seasons and places where fish should be caught. The final volume includes pies, tarts, fritters, and a recipe for a sweet Neapolitan pizza (not the current savoury version, as tomatoes had not yet been introduced to Italy). However, such items from the New World as corn (maize) and turkey are included. Eventually, through the Columbian exchange, Italian cuisine would also adopt not just tomatoes as a key flavour, but also beans, pumpkins, courgette, and peppers, all of which came from the Americas during the last few hundred years.

In the first decade of the 17th century, Giacomo Castelvetro wrote Brieve racconto di tutte le radici, di tutte l'erbe e di tutti i frutti che crudi o cotti in Italia si mangiano, translated into English by Gillian Riley. Originally from Modena, Castelvetro moved to England because he was a Protestant. The book lists Italian vegetables and fruits along with their preparation. He featured vegetables as a central part of the meal, not just as accompaniments. Castelvetro favoured simmering vegetables in salted water and serving them warm or cold with olive oil, salt, freshly ground pepper, lemon juice, verjus or orange juice. He also suggested roasting vegetables wrapped in damp paper over charcoal or embers with a drizzle of olive oil. Castelvetro's book is separated into seasons with hop shoots in the spring and truffles in the winter, detailing the use of pigs in the search for truffles.

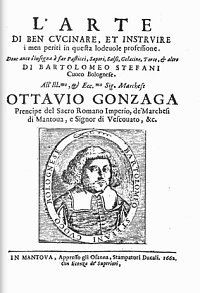
L'arte di ben cucinare (The Art of Well Cooking), published by Bartolomeo Stefani in 1662

In 1662, Bartolomeo Stefani, chef to the Duchy of Mantua, published L'Arte di ben cucinare (The Art of Well Cooking). He was the first to offer a section on vitto ordinario (ordinary food). The book described a banquet given by Duke Charles for Queen Christina of Sweden, with details of the food and table settings for each guest, including a knife, fork, spoon, glass, a plate (instead of the bowls more often used), and a napkin.

Other books from this time, such as Galatheo (Etiquette) by Giovanni della Casa, tell how scalci (waiters) should manage themselves while serving their guests. Waiters should not scratch their heads or other parts of themselves, or spit, sniff, cough or sneeze while serving diners. The book also told diners not to use their fingers while eating and not to wipe sweat with their napkin.

=== Modern era ===
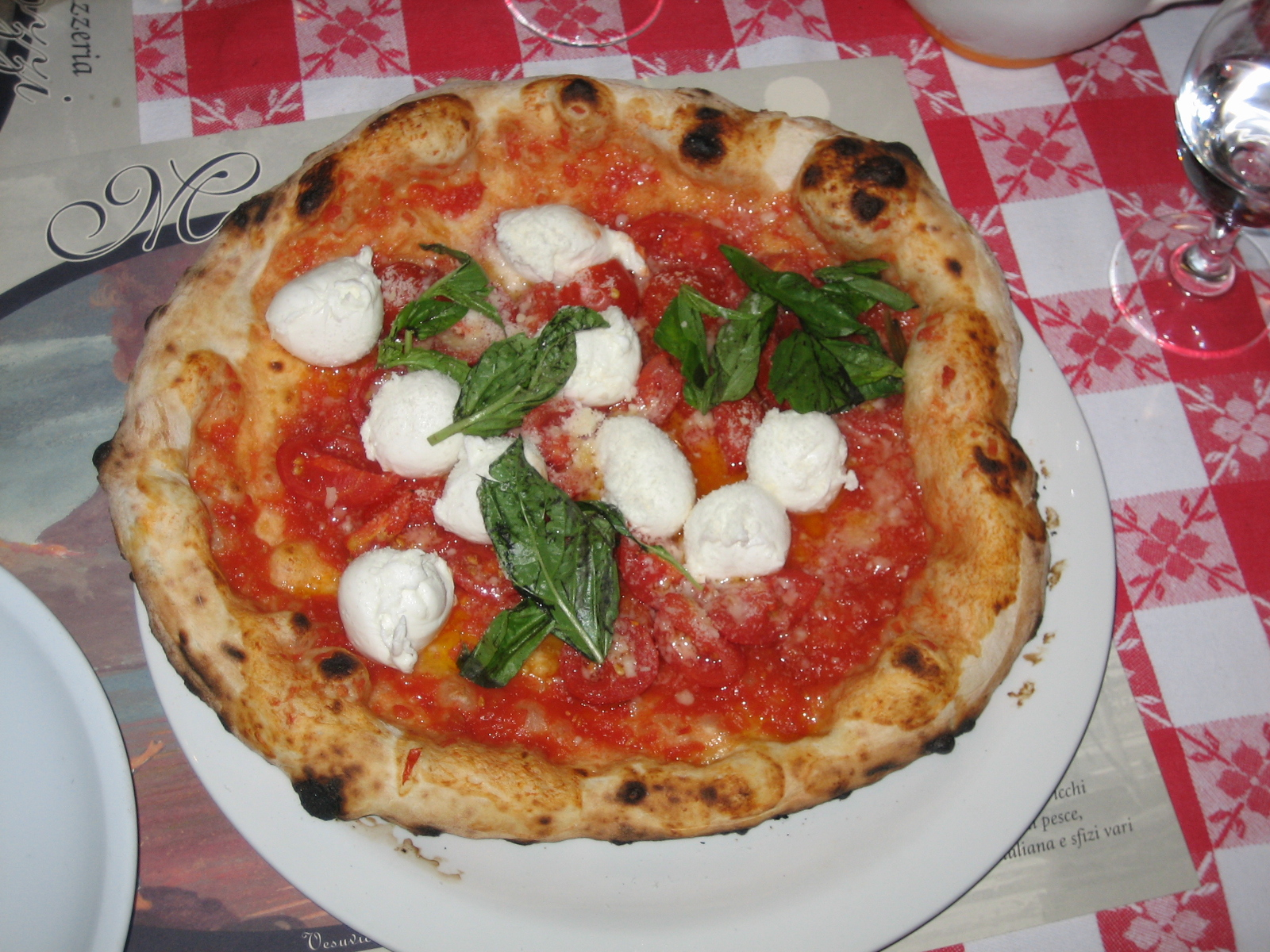
The ingredients of pizza Margherita—tomatoes (red), mozzarella (white), and basil (green)—are said to be inspired by the Italian flag.

At the beginning of the 18th century, Italian culinary books began to emphasise the regionalism of Italian cuisine rather than French cuisine. Books written then were no longer addressed to professional chefs but to bourgeois housewives. Periodicals in booklet form such as La cuoca cremonese (The Cook of Cremona) in 1794 give a sequence of ingredients according to season along with chapters on meat, fish, and vegetables. As the century progressed these books increased in size, popularity, and frequency.

In the 18th century, medical texts warned peasants against eating refined foods as it was believed that these were poor for their digestion and their bodies required heavy meals. It was believed that peasants ate poorly because they preferred eating poorly. However, many peasants had to eat rotten food and mouldy bread because that was all they could afford.

In 1779, Antonio Nebbia from Macerata in the Marche region, wrote Il cuoco maceratese (The Cook of Macerata). Nebbia addressed the importance of local vegetables and pasta, rice, and gnocchi. For stock, he preferred vegetables and chicken over other meats.

In 1773, the Neapolitan Vincenzo Corrado's Il cuoco galante (The Courteous Cook) gave particular emphasis to vitto pitagorico (pythagorean food). "Pythagorean food consists of fresh herbs, roots, flowers, fruits, seeds and all that is produced in the earth for our nourishment. It is so-called because Pythagoras, as is well known, only used such produce. There is no doubt that this kind of food appears to be more natural to man, and the use of meat is noxious." This book was the first to give the tomato a central role with 13 recipes.

Zuppa al pomodoro (lit. 'tomato soup') in Corrado's book is a dish similar to today's Tuscan pappa al pomodoro. Corrado's 1798 edition introduced a "Treatise on the Potato" after the French Antoine-Augustin Parmentier's successful promotion of the tuber. In 1790, Francesco Leonardi in his book L'Apicio moderno (The Modern Apicius) sketches a history of the Italian cuisine from the Roman Age and gives the first recipe of a tomato-based sauce.

In the 19th century, Giovanni Vialardi, chef to King Victor Emmanuel II, wrote Trattato di cucina, pasticceria moderna, credenza e relativa confettureria (Treatise of Modern Cookery and Patisserie) with recipes "suitable for a modest household". Many of his recipes are for regional dishes from Turin, including 12 for potatoes such as cappon magro genovese. In 1829, Il nuovo cuoco milanese economico (The New Economic Milanese Chef) by Giovanni Felice Luraschi featured Milanese dishes such as kidney with anchovies and lemon and gnocchi alla romana. Gian Battista and Giovanni Ratto's La cucina genovese (The Genoese cuisine) in 1871 addressed the cuisine of Liguria. This book contained the first recipe for pesto. La cucina teorico-pratica (The Theoretical-Practical Cuisine) written by Ippolito Cavalcanti described the first recipe for pasta with tomatoes.

La scienza in cucina e l'arte di mangiare bene (The Science of Cooking and the Art of Eating Well), by Pellegrino Artusi, first published in 1891, is widely regarded as the canon of classic modern Italian cuisine, and it is still in print. Its recipes predominantly originate from Romagna and Tuscany, where he lived. Around 1880, two decades after the unification of Italy, was the beginning of Italian diaspora, and with it started the spread of Italian cuisine in the world.

=== Contemporary era ===
Italy has a large number of traditional specialities protected under EU law. From the 1950s onwards, a great variety of typical products of Italian cuisine have been listed as PDO, PGI, TSG and GI by the Council of the European Union, to which they are added the indicazione geografica tipica (IGT), the regional prodotti agroalimentari tradizionali (PAT) and the municipal denominazione comunale d'origine (De.C.O.). In the oenological field, there are specific legal protections: the denominazione di origine controllata (DOC) and the denominazione di origine controllata e garantita (DOCG). protected designation of origin (PDO) and protected geographical indications (PGI) have also been established in olive growing. Some of these are new introductions: the kiwifruit was introduced from New Zealand to Italy in the 1970s, and three decades later, the province of Latina was designated the "Land of the Kiwi" and given protected status as a regional delicacy.

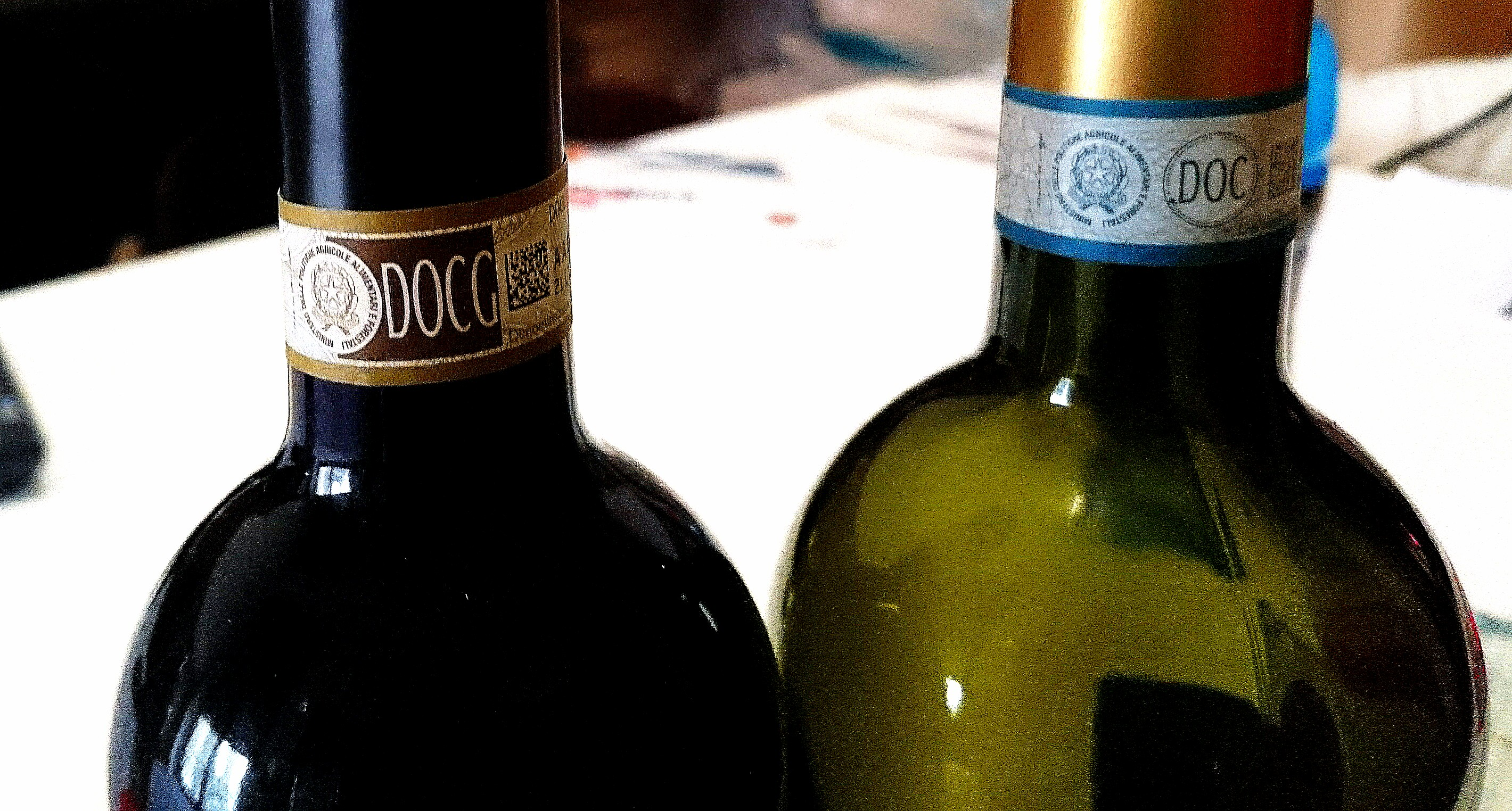
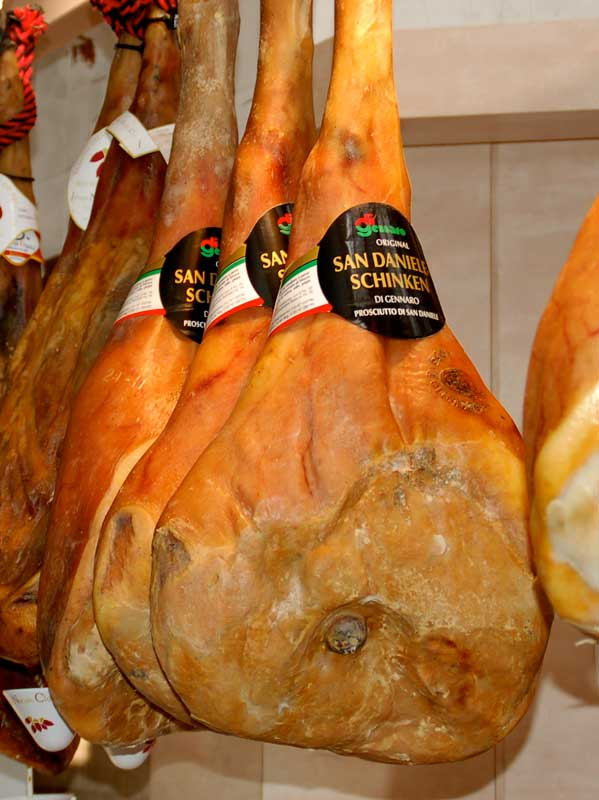
Italian products labelled with protected status. The wines are labelled DOCG and DOC, the prosciutto di San Daniele is labelled PDO.

Italian cuisine is one of the most popular and copied cultures worldwide. The lack or total unavailability of some of its most characteristic ingredients outside of Italy, leads to the complete de-naturalization of Italian ingredients, and above all else leads to falsifications (or food fraud). This phenomenon, widespread in all continents, is better known as Italian Sounding, consisting in the use of Italian words as well as images, colour combinations (the Italian tricolour), geographical references, and brands evocative of Italy to promote and market agri-food products which in reality have nothing to do with Italian cuisine. Italian Sounding invests in almost every sector of Italian food, from the most famous Italian cheeses to cured meats, a variety of pasta, regional bread, extra virgin olive oils, and wines. Counterfeit products violate registered trademarks or other distinctive signs protected by law such as the designations of origin (DOC, PDO, DOCG, PGI, TSG, IGT). Therefore, the counterfeiting is legally punishable. However, Italian Sounding cannot be classified as illegal from a strictly legal standpoint, but they still represent "a huge damage to the Italian economy and to the potential resources of Made in Italy". Two out of three Italian agri-food products sold worldwide are not made in Italy. The Italian Sounding phenomenon is estimated to generate €55 billion worldwide annually.

Following the spread of fast food, also in Italy, imported from Anglo-Saxon countries and in particular from the United States in 1986, in Bra, Piedmont, the Slow Food cultural and gastronomic movement was founded, then converted into an institution with the aim of protecting culinary specificities and to safeguard various regional products of Italian cuisine under the control of the Slow Food Presidia. Slow Food also focuses on food quality, rather than quantity. It speaks out against overproduction and food waste, and sees globalization as a process in which small and local farmers and food producers should be simultaneously protected from and included in the global food system.

The Italian chef Gualtiero Marchesi (1930–2017) is considered the founder of Italian nouvelle cuisine. Italian nouvelle cuisine is characterised by lighter, more delicate dishes and an increased emphasis on presentation, and it designed for the most expensive restaurants. It is defined as a "cuisine of the head rather than the throat" and it is characterised by the separation of flavours, without ever upsetting the ancient Italian culinary tradition despite the use, in its recipes, of some culinary traditions of other countries.

Italian cooking, between sustainability and biocultural diversity
- UNESCO Intangible Cultural Heritage
- Country: Italy
- Reference: 02093
- Region: Europe and North America

Inscription history
- Inscription: 2025 (Vingtième session du Comité intergouvernemental de sauvegarde du patrimoine culturel immatériel session)
- List: Representative List of the Intangible Cultural Heritage of Humanity

In 2025, Italian cuisine was listed as intangible cultural heritage by UNESCO.

== Basic foods ==
Italian cuisine has a great variety of different ingredients which are commonly used, ranging from fruits and vegetables to grains to cheeses, meats, and fish.

In northern Italy, fish (such as cod, or baccalà), potatoes, rice, corn (maize), sausages, pork, and different types of cheese are the most common ingredients. Pasta dishes with tomato are common throughout Italy. Italians use ingredients that are fresh and subtly seasoned and spiced.

In northern Italy there are many types of stuffed pasta, although polenta and risotto are equally popular if not more so. Ligurian ingredients include several types of fish and seafood dishes. Basil (found in pesto), nuts, and olive oil are very common. In Emilia-Romagna, common ingredients include prosciutto (Italian ham), cotechino, different sorts of salami, truffles, grana, Parmigiano Reggiano, tomatoes (Bolognese sauce or ragù), and balsamic vinegar (Italian: aceto balsamico).

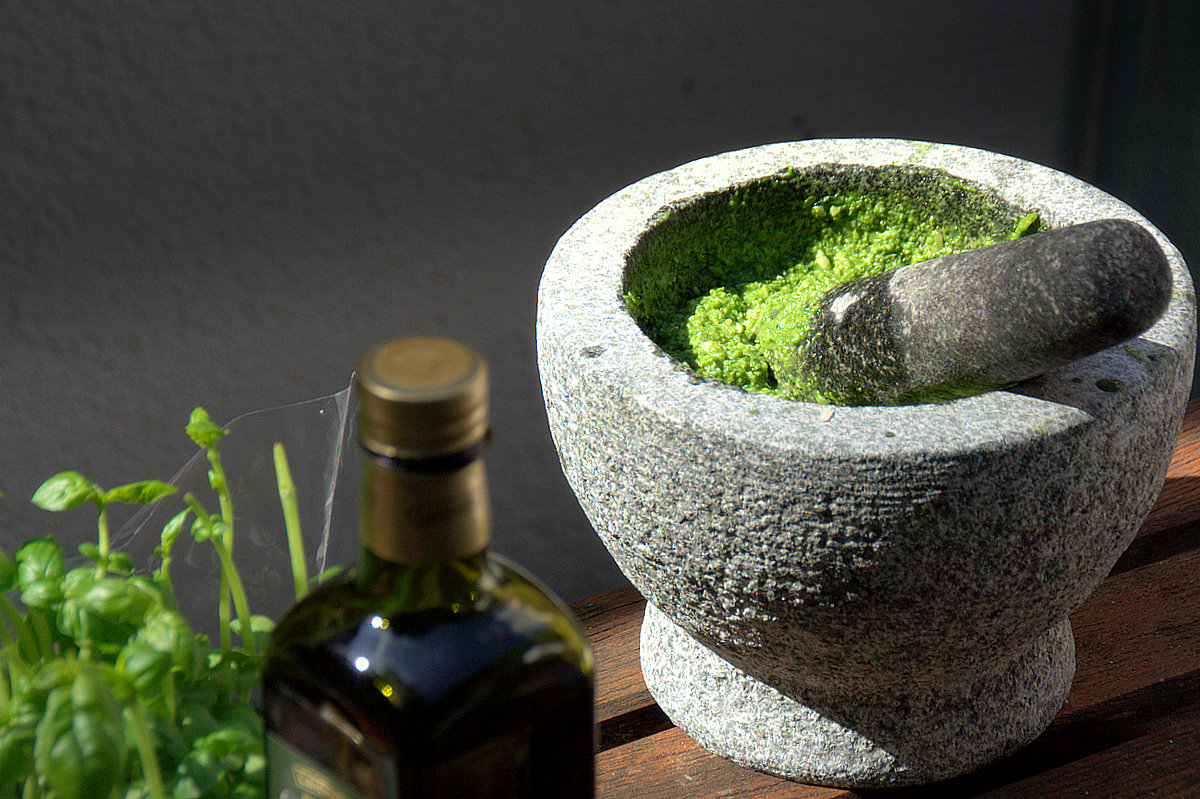
Pesto, a Ligurian sauce

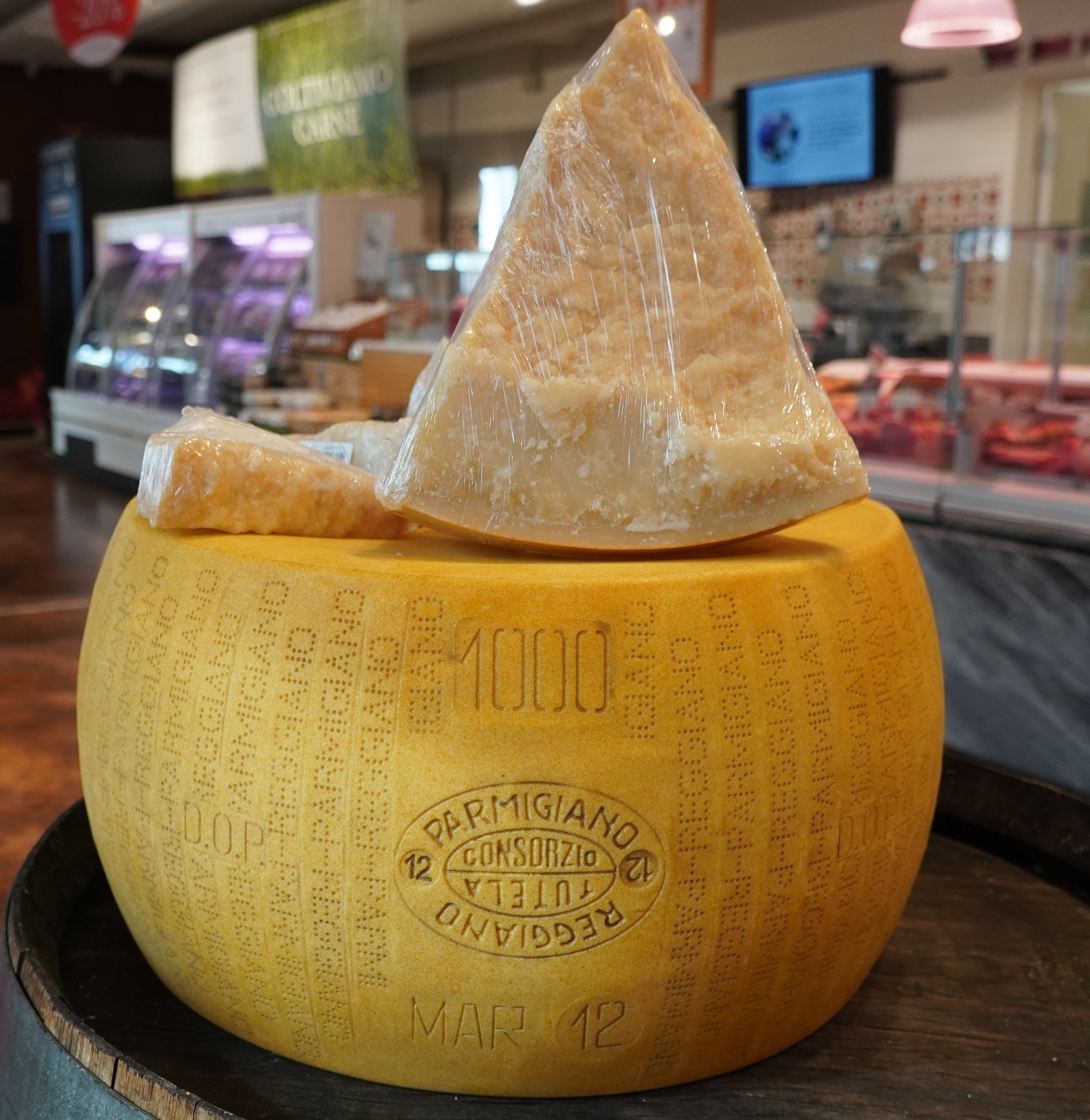
Parmigiano Reggiano cheese

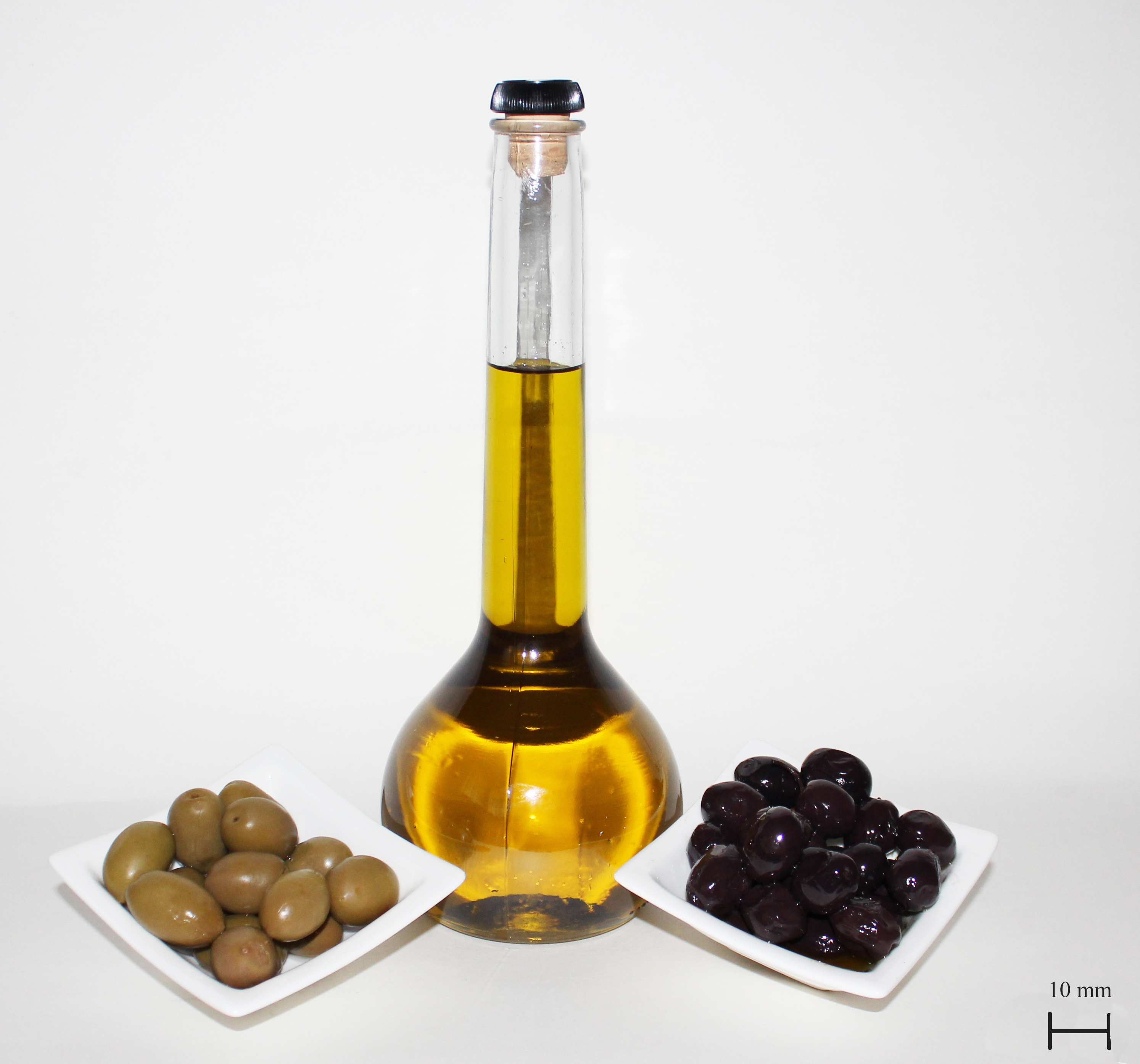
Olive oil

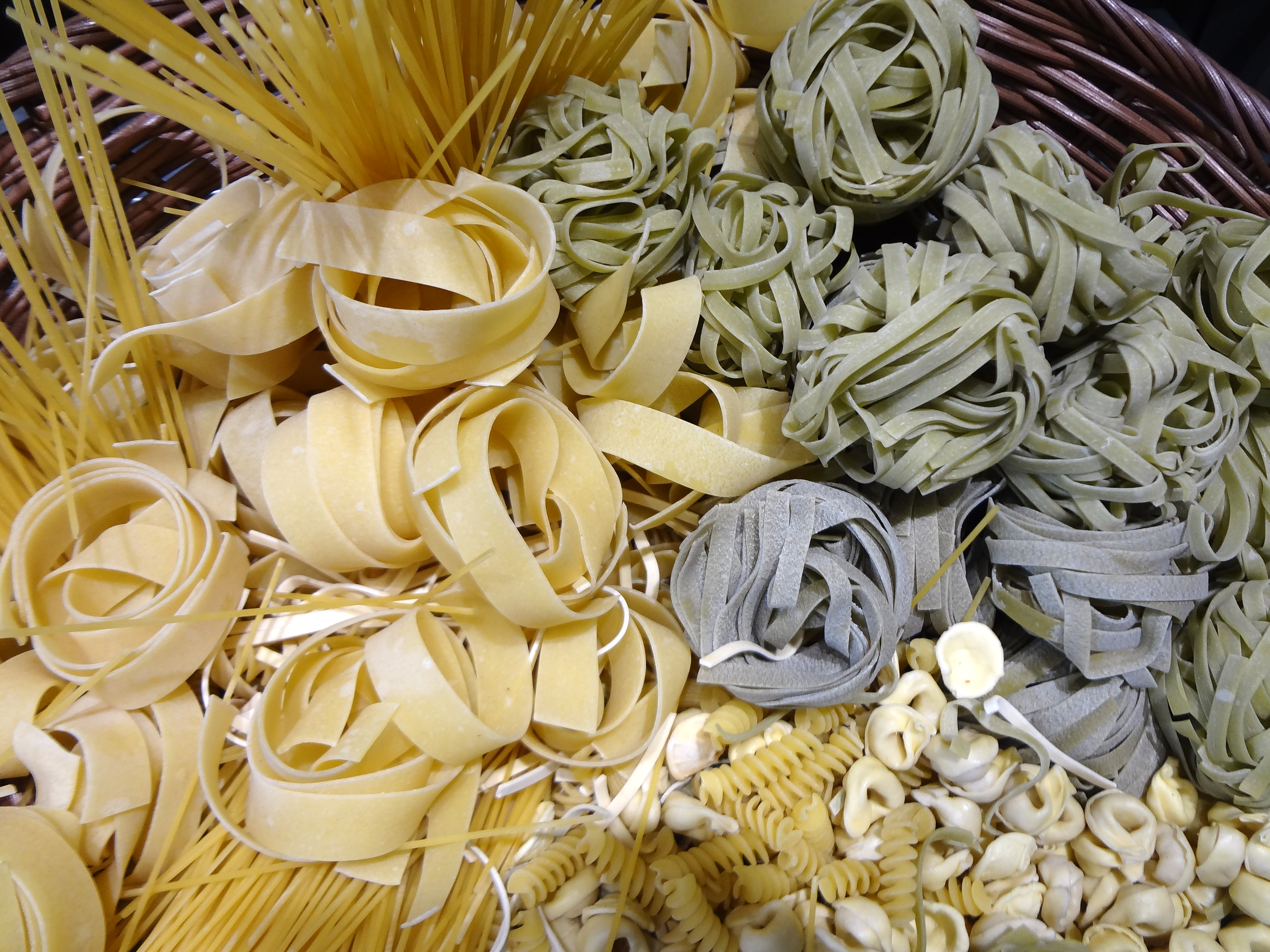
Various types of pasta

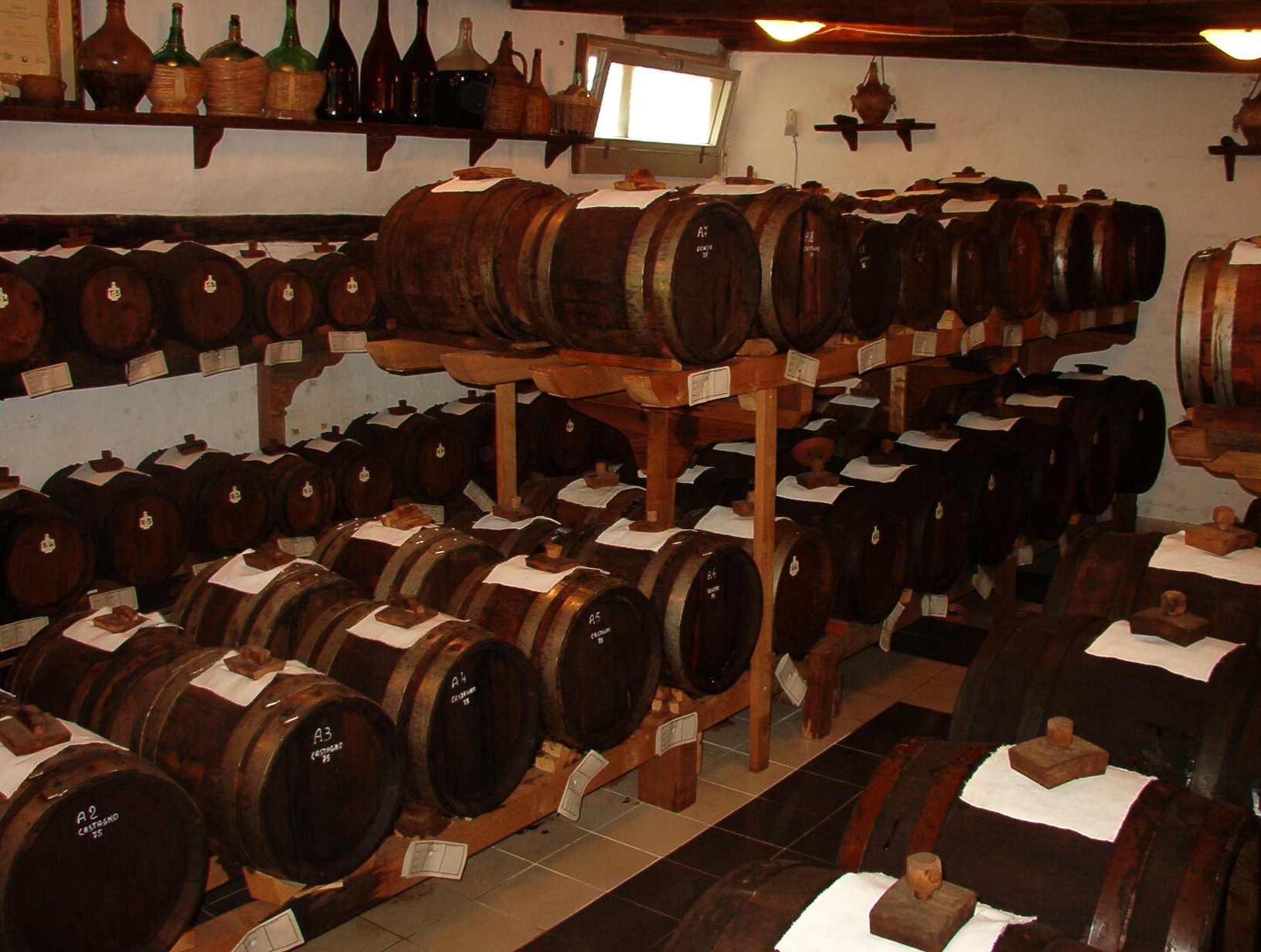
Barrels of aging balsamic vinegar

Traditional central Italian cuisine uses ingredients such as tomatoes, all types of meat, fish, and pecorino. In Tuscany, pasta (especially pappardelle) is traditionally served with meat sauce (including game meat). In southern Italy, tomatoes (fresh or cooked into tomato sauce), peppers, olives and olive oil, garlic, artichokes, oranges, ricotta cheese, aubergines, courgette, certain types of fish (anchovies, sardines, and tuna), and capers are important components to the local cuisine.

Many cheeses and dairy products are made in Italy. There are more than 600 distinct types throughout the country, of which 490 are protected and marked as PDO (protected designation of origin), PGI (protected geographical indication) and PAT (prodotti agroalimentari tradizionali).

Olive oil is the most commonly used vegetable fat in Italian cooking and as the basis for sauces, replaced only in some recipes and in some geographical areas by butter or lard. Italy is the largest consumer of olive oil, at 30% of the world total. It also has the largest range of olive cultivars in existence and is the second largest producer and exporter in the world, producing more than 464,000 tons. Bread has always been a fundamental food in Italian cuisine, and that of other Mediterranean countries. There are numerous regional types of bread.

=== Meats ===
Italian cuisine has a great variety of sausages and cured meats, many of which are protected and marked as PDO and PGI, and make up 34% of the total of sausages and cured meats consumed in Europe, while others are marked as PAT.

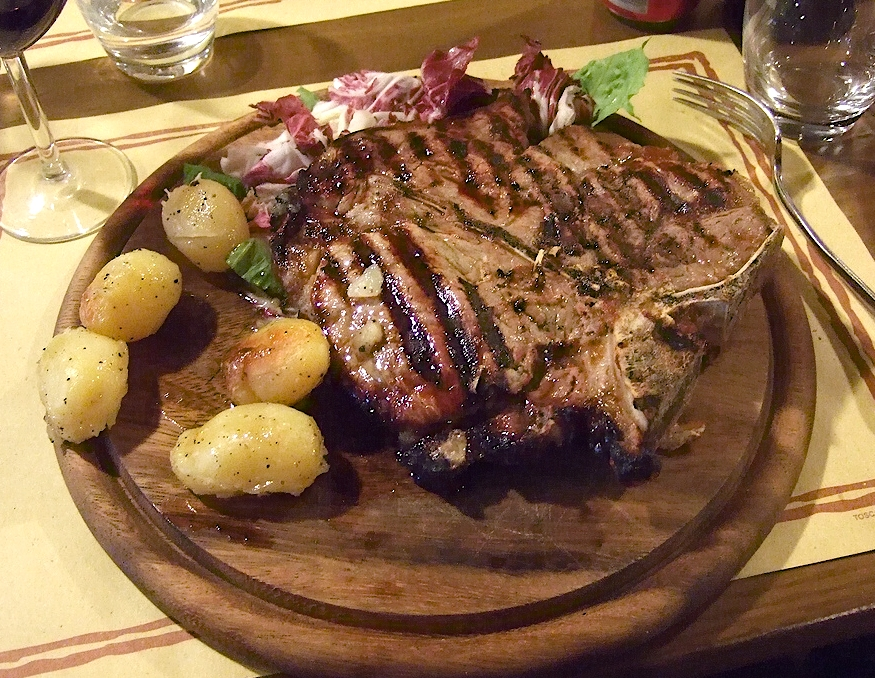
Bistecca alla fiorentina

Meat, especially beef, pork, and poultry, is very present in Italian cuisine, in a very wide range of preparations and recipes. It is also important as an ingredient in the preparation of sauces for pasta. In addition to the varieties mentioned, albeit less commonly, sheep, goat, horse, rabbit and, even less commonly, game meat are also consumed in Italy.

Since Italy is largely surrounded by the sea, therefore having a great coastal development and being rich in lakes, fish (both marine and freshwater), as well as crustaceans, molluscs, and other seafood, enjoy a prominent place in Italian cuisine, as in general in the Mediterranean cuisine. Fish is the second course in meals and is also an ingredient in the preparation of seasonings for types of pasta. It is also widely used in appetisers.

==== Salumi ====
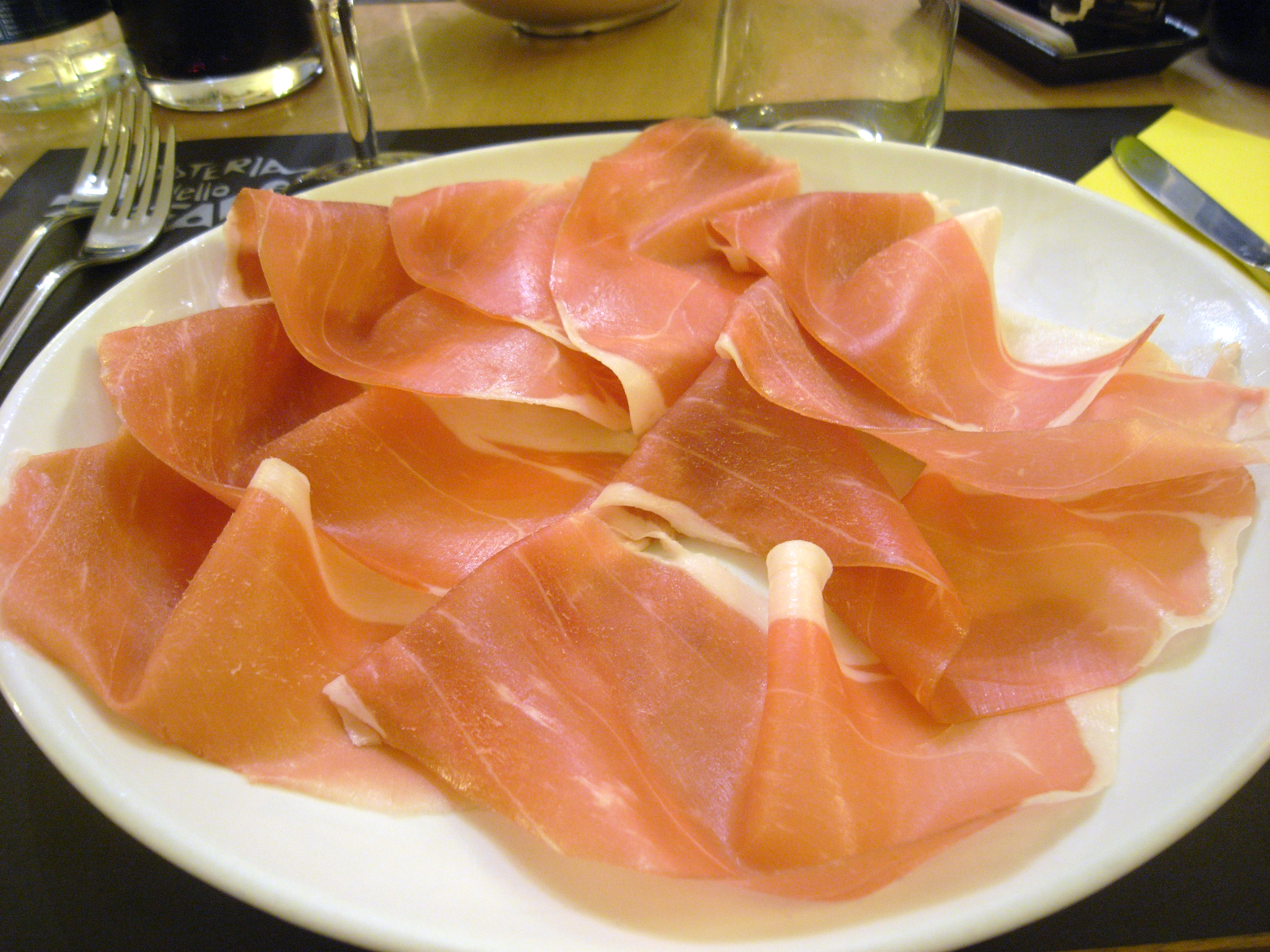
Prosciutto di Parma

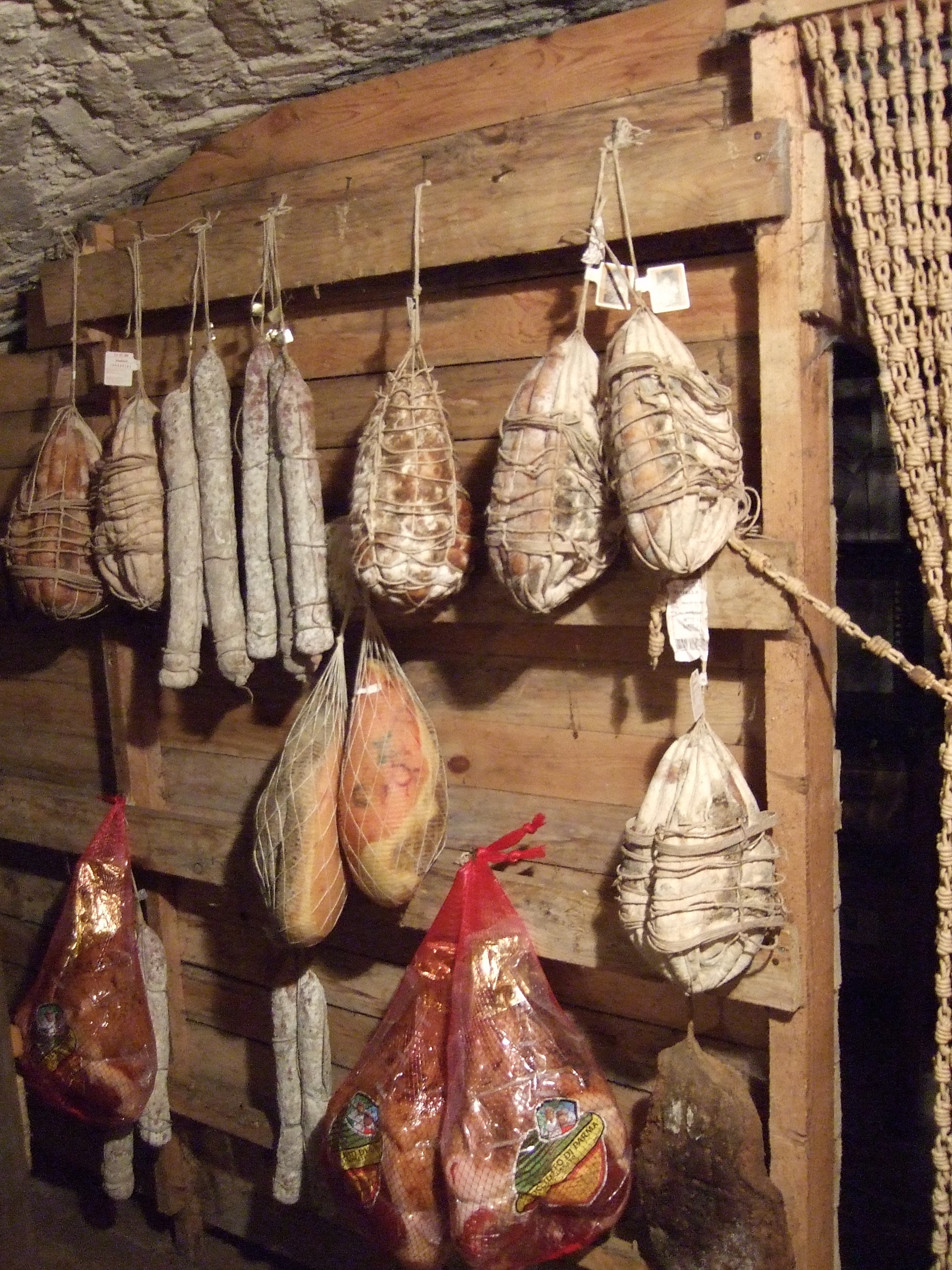
Aging salumi

Salumi are Italian meat products typical of an antipasto, predominantly made from pork and cured. They also include bresaola, which is made from beef, and some cooked products, such as mortadella.

=== Pasta ===
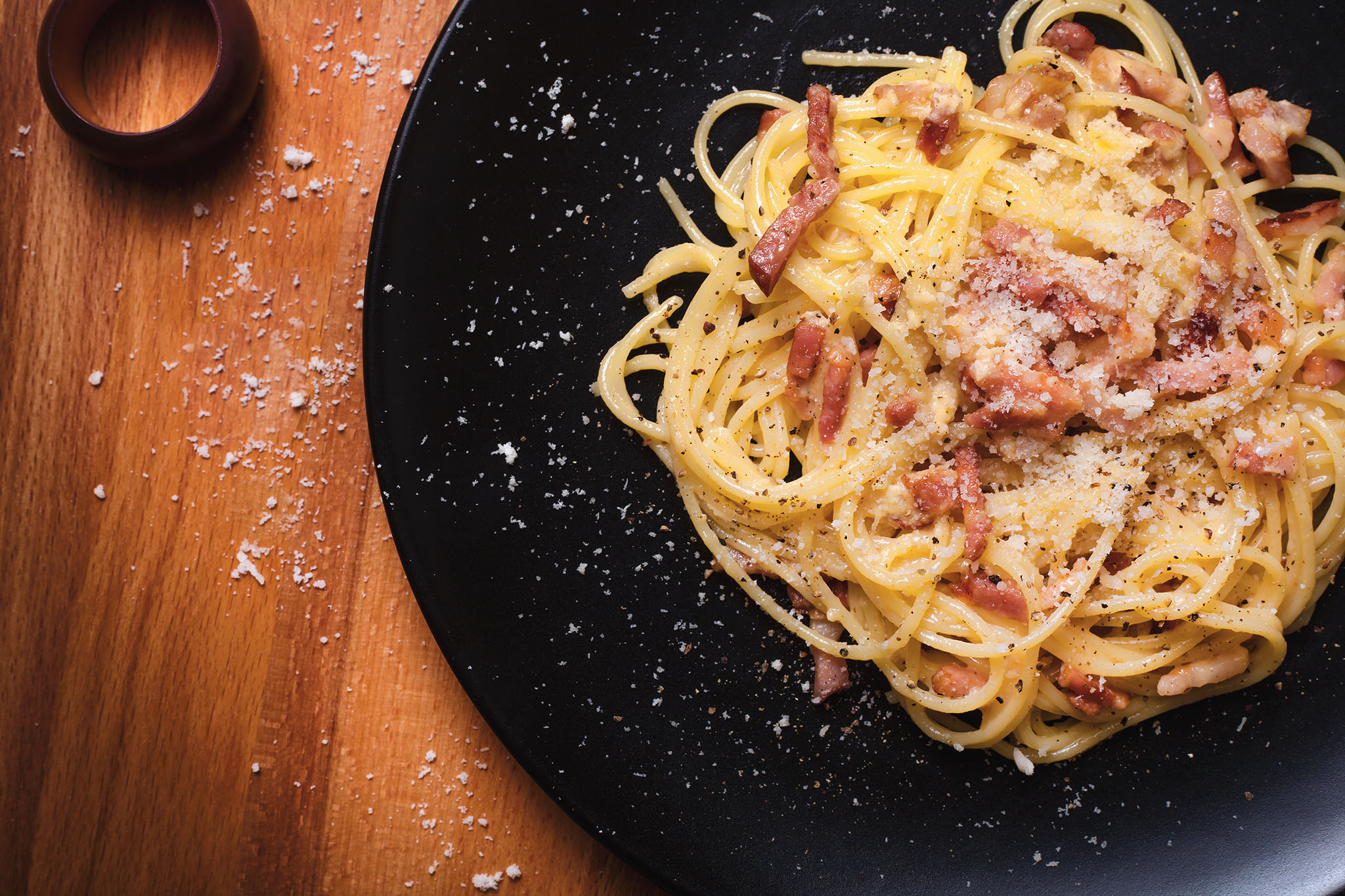
Carbonara

Italian cuisine is also well known (and well regarded) for its use of a diverse variety of pasta. Pasta includes noodles in various lengths, widths, and shapes. Most pastas may be distinguished by the shapes for which they are named—penne, maccheroni, spaghetti, linguine, fusilli, lasagna. More varieties are filled with other ingredients, such as ravioli and tortellini.

The word pasta is also used to refer to dishes in which pasta products are a primary ingredient. It is usually served with sauce. There are hundreds of different shapes of pasta with at least locally recognised names. Examples include spaghetti ('thin rods'), rigatoni ('tubes' or 'cylinders'), fusilli ('swirls'), and lasagna. Dumplings, such as gnocchi (made with potatoes or pumpkin) and noodles such as spätzle, are sometimes considered pasta.

Pasta is divided into two broad categories: dry pasta (100% durum wheat flour mixed with water) and fresh pasta (also with soft wheat flour and almost always mixed with eggs). Pasta is generally cooked by boiling. Under Italian law, dry pasta (pasta secca) can only be made from durum wheat flour or durum wheat semolina, and is more commonly used in southern Italy compared to their northern counterparts, who traditionally prefer the fresh egg variety.

Durum flour and durum semolina have a yellow tinge in colour. Italian dried pasta is traditionally cooked al dente (lit. 'to the tooth'). There are many types of wheat flour with varying gluten and protein levels depending on the variety of grain used.

Particular varieties of pasta may also use other grains and milling methods to make the flour, as specified by law. Some pasta varieties, such as pizzoccheri, are made from buckwheat flour. Fresh pasta may include eggs (Italian: pasta all'uovo, lit. 'egg pasta').

Both dry and fresh pasta are used to prepare the dish, in three different ways:

- pastasciutta: pasta is cooked and then served with a sauce or other condiment;
- minestrone: pasta is cooked and served in meat or vegetable broth (minestra), even together with chopped vegetables (minestrone);
- pasta al forno: the pasta is first cooked and seasoned, and then passed back to the oven.

=== Pizza ===
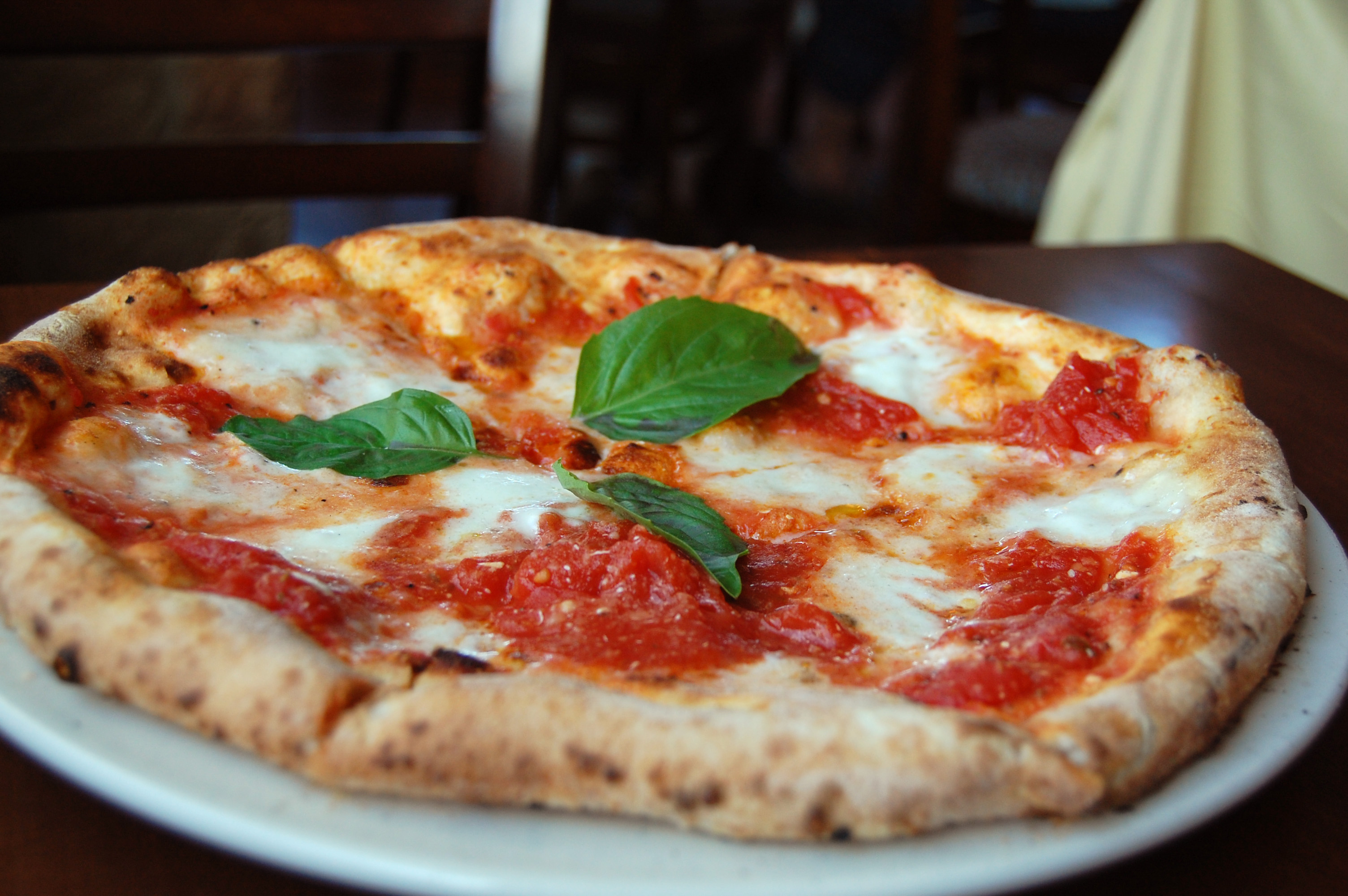
Pizza Margherita

Pizza, consisting of a usually round, flat base of leavened wheat-based dough topped with tomatoes, cheese, and often various other ingredients (such as anchovies, mushrooms, onions, olives, meats, and more), which is then baked at a high temperature, traditionally in a wood-fired oven, is the best known and most consumed Italian food in the world.

In 2009, upon Italy's request, Neapolitan pizza was registered with the European Union as a traditional speciality guaranteed dish, and in 2017 the art of its making was included on UNESCO's list of intangible cultural heritage. Up to 20% of the flour in the traditional pizza crust can be strong Manitoba flour, which was introduced to Italy from Canada as part of the Marshall Plan after World War II. In Italy it is consumed as a single dish (pizza al piatto) or as a snack, even on the go (pizza al taglio). In the various regions, dishes similar to pizza are the various types of focaccia, such as piadina, crescia or sfincione.

== Regional cuisines ==
Each area has its own specialties, primarily at a regional level, but also at the provincial level. The differences can come from a bordering country, whether a region is close to the sea or the mountains, and economics. Italian cuisine is also seasonal with priority placed on the use of fresh produce.

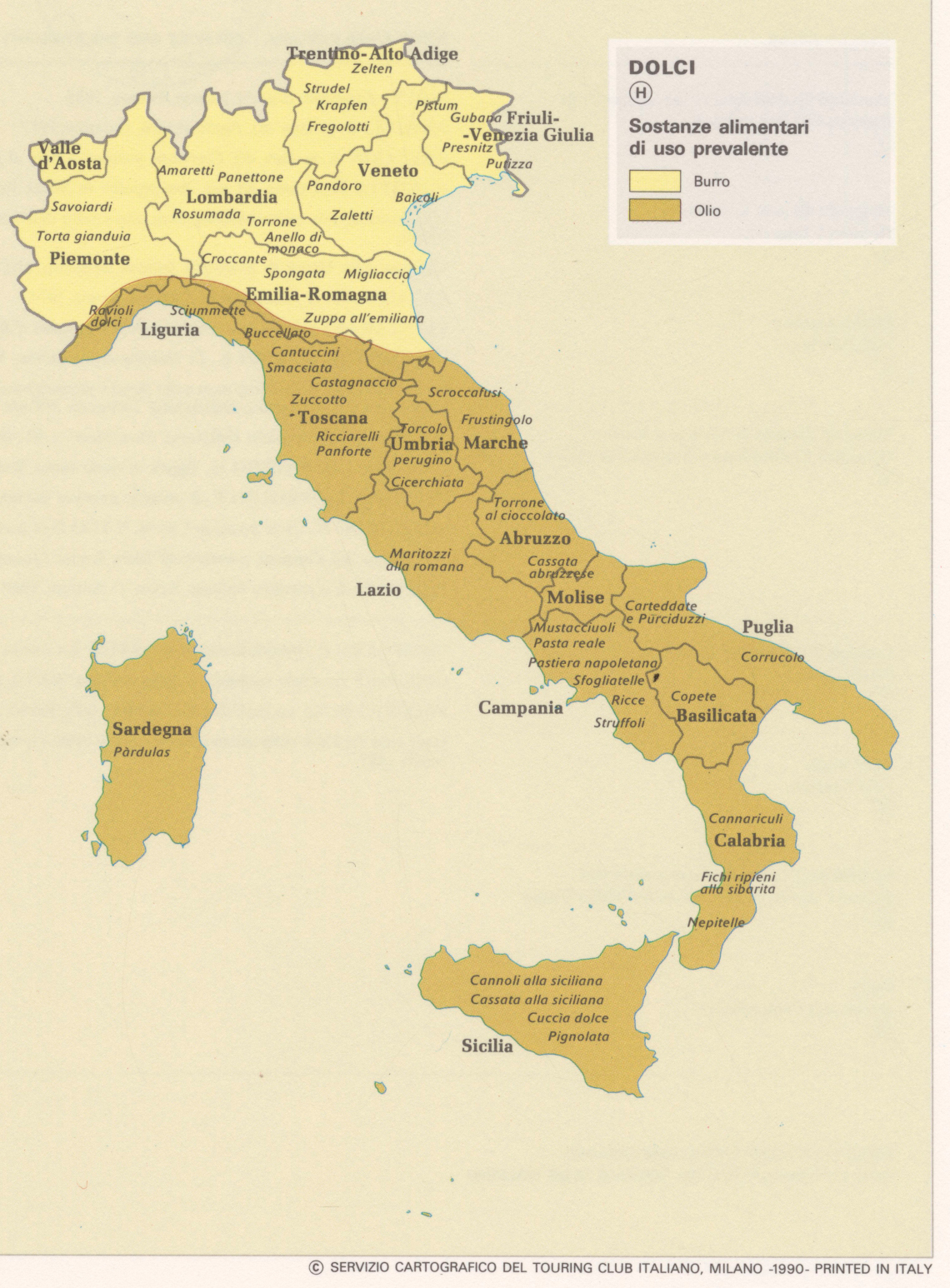
Commonly used in desserts:
butter prevalent
oil prevalent

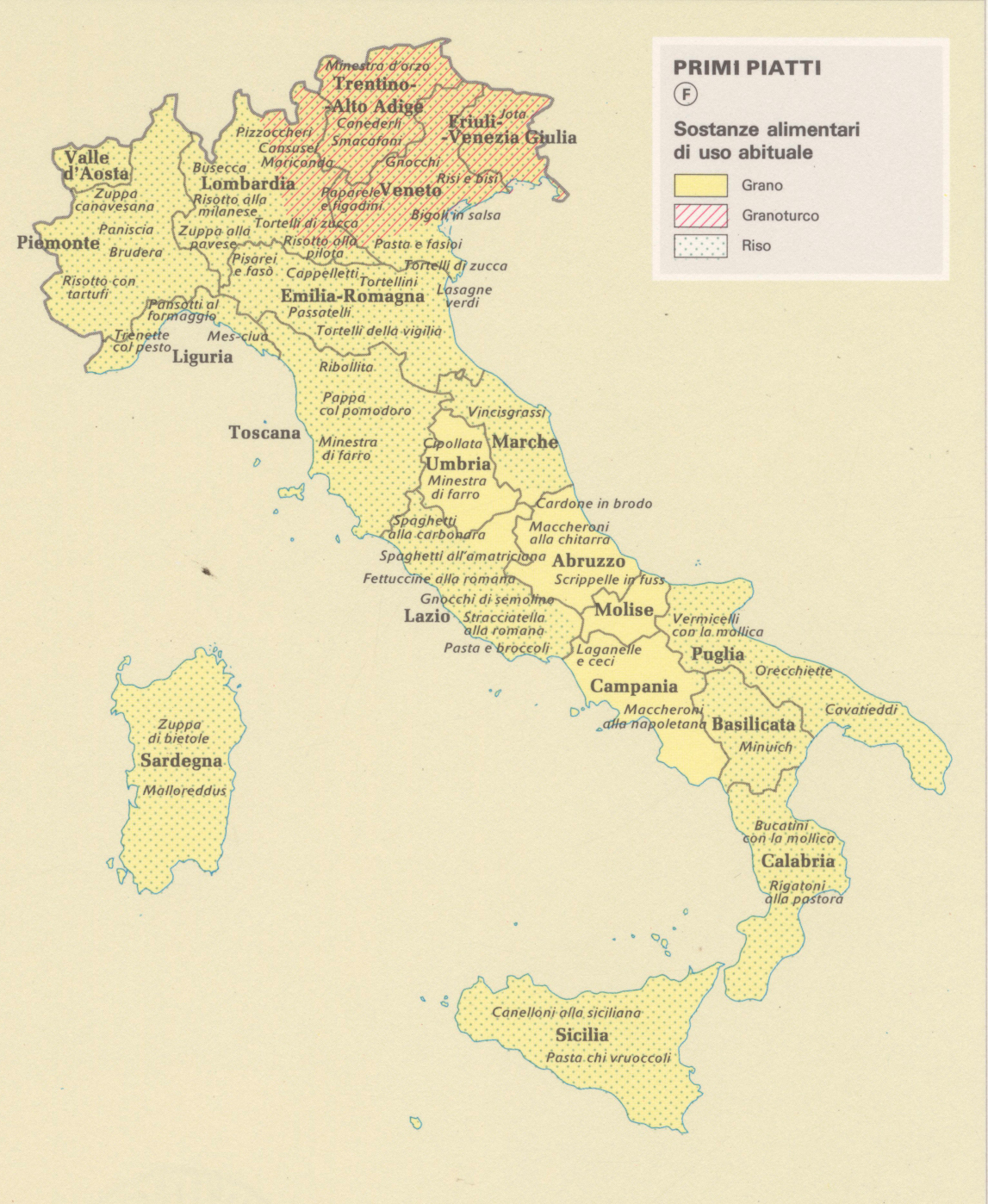
Staple ingredients for first courses:
solid yellow: wheat
red diagonal stripes: corn
gray dots: rice

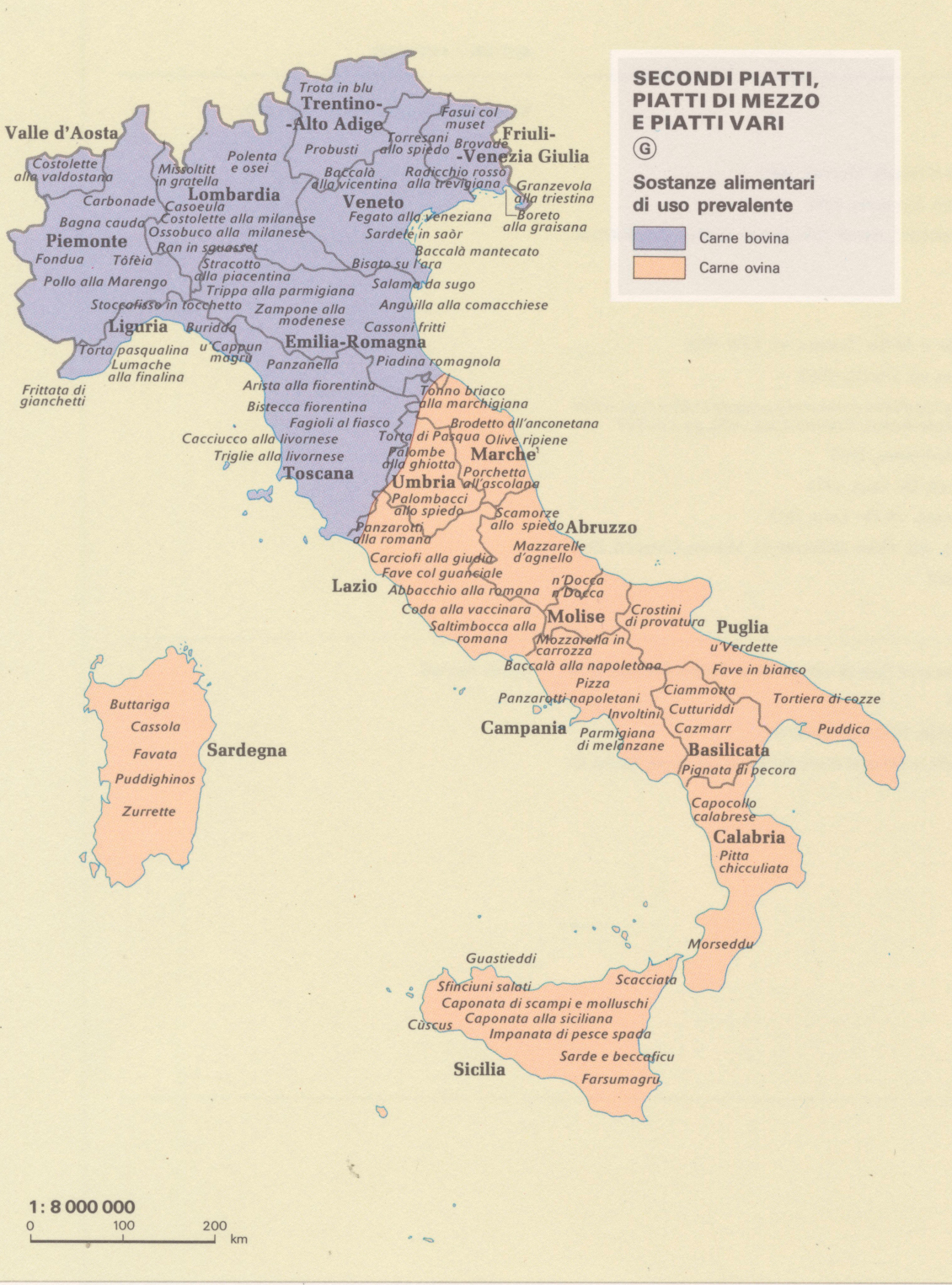
Prevalent meats for second courses:
beef
sheep meat

=== Abruzzo and Molise ===
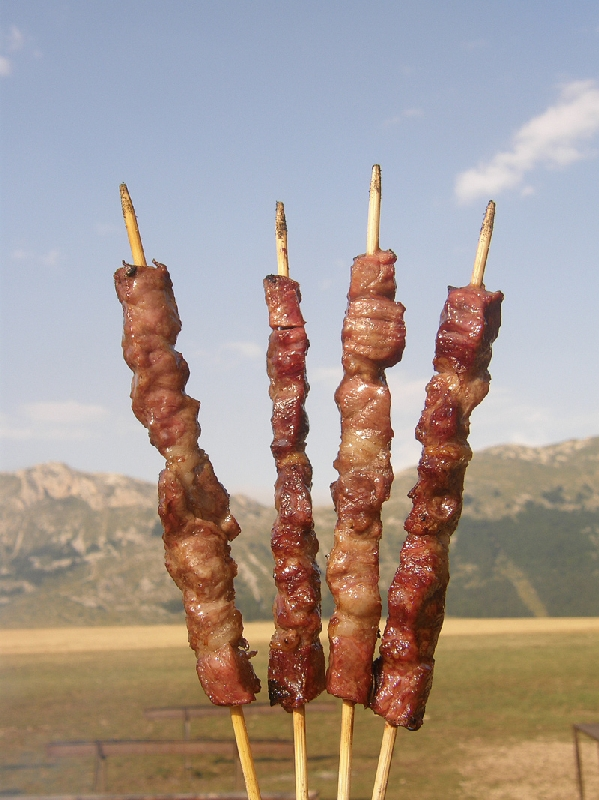
Arrosticini

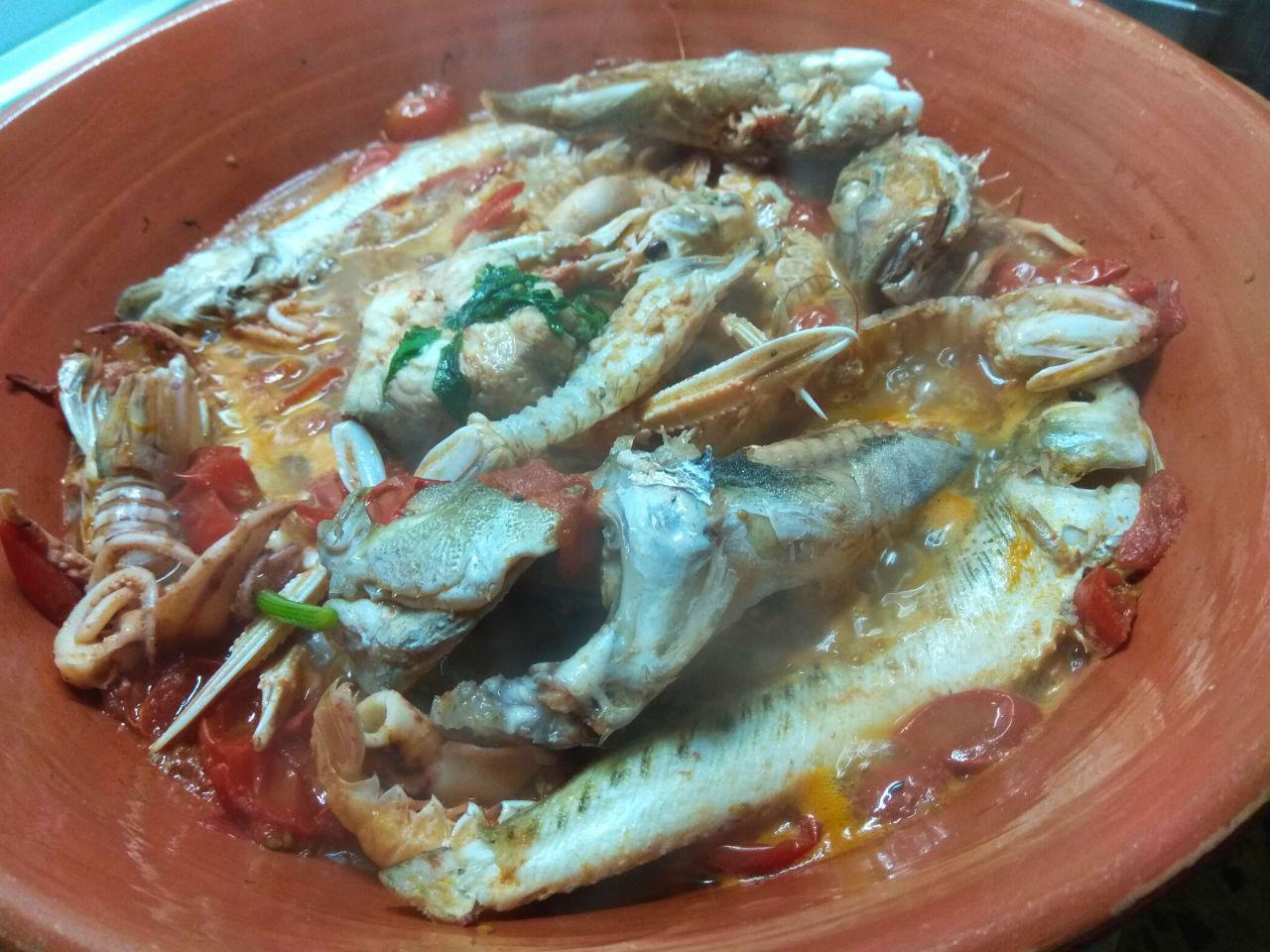
Brodetto alla vastese, a fish stew dish from Vasto, Abruzzo

Pasta, meat, and vegetables are central to the cuisine of Abruzzo and Molise. Chili peppers (Italian: peperoncini) are typical of Abruzzo, where they are called diavoletti (lit. 'little devils') for their spicy heat. Due to the long history of shepherding in Abruzzo and Molise, lamb dishes are common. Lamb meat is often paired with pasta. Mushrooms (usually wild mushrooms), rosemary, and garlic are also extensively used in Abruzzese cuisine.

The extra virgin olive oil produced in the local farms on the hills of the region, marked by the quality level DOP and is considered one of the best varieties in the country. A few wines created in the area, such as Montepulciano DOCG and Trebbiano d'Abruzzo DOC, are considered amongst the world's finest wines. In 2012, a bottle of Trebbiano d'Abruzzo Colline Teramane ranked No. 1 in the top 50 Italian wine award. Centerbe is a strong (72% alcohol), spicy herbal liqueur drunk by the locals. Another liqueur is genziana, a soft distillate of gentian roots.

The best-known dish from Abruzzo is arrosticini, little pieces of castrated lamb on a wooden stick and cooked on coals. The chitarra (lit. 'guitar') is a fine stringed tool that pasta dough is pressed through for cutting. In the province of Teramo, famous local dishes include the virtù soup (made with legumes, vegetables, and pork meat), the timballo (pasta sheets filled with meat, vegetables or rice), and the mazzarelle (lamb intestines filled with garlic, marjoram, lettuce, and various spices). The popularity of saffron, grown in the province of L'Aquila, has waned in recent years.

Seafood is also an important part of Abruzzo cuisine, with fish products such as brodetti, scapece alla vastese, baccalà all'abruzzese, cozze allo zafferano, classic cooked mussels prepared with parsley, onion, bay leaf, white wine, and olive oil, and seasoned with L'Aquila saffron sauce, and coregone di Campotosto, typical lake fish.

The most famous dish of Molise is cavatelli, a long shaped, handmade macaroni-type pasta made of flour, semolina, and water, often served with meat sauce, broccoli or mushrooms. Pizzelle waffles are a common dessert, especially around Christmas.

=== Aosta Valley ===
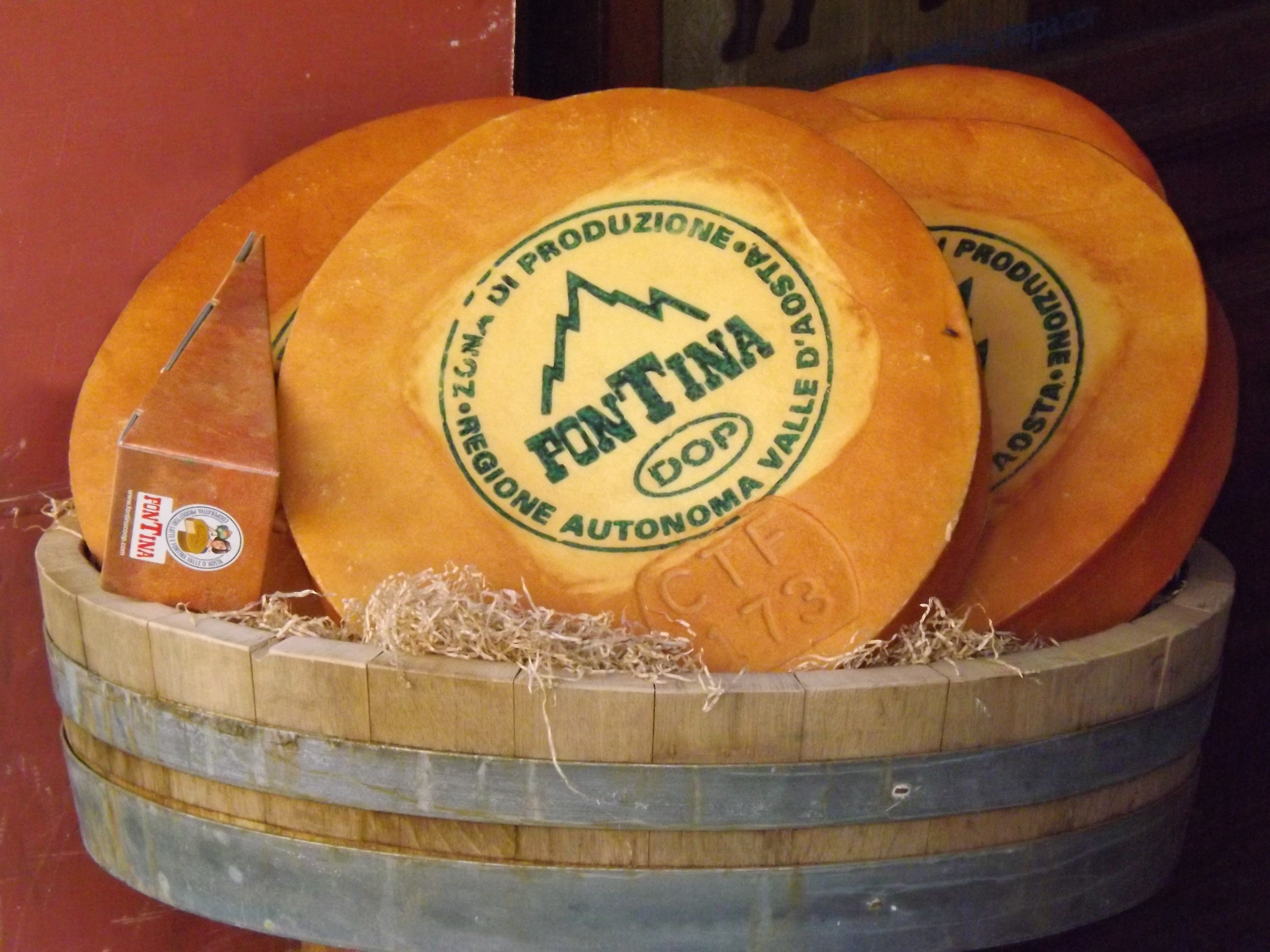
Fontina cheese from Aosta Valley

In the Aosta Valley, bread-thickened soups are customary as well as cheese fondue, chestnuts, potatoes, and rice. Polenta is a staple along with rye bread, smoked bacon, motsetta (cured chamois meat), and game meat from the mountains and forests. Butter and cream are important in stewed, roasted, and braised dishes.

Typical regional products include fontina cheese, Vallée d'Aoste Lard d'Arnad, red wines, and Génépi Artemisia-based liqueur.

=== Apulia ===
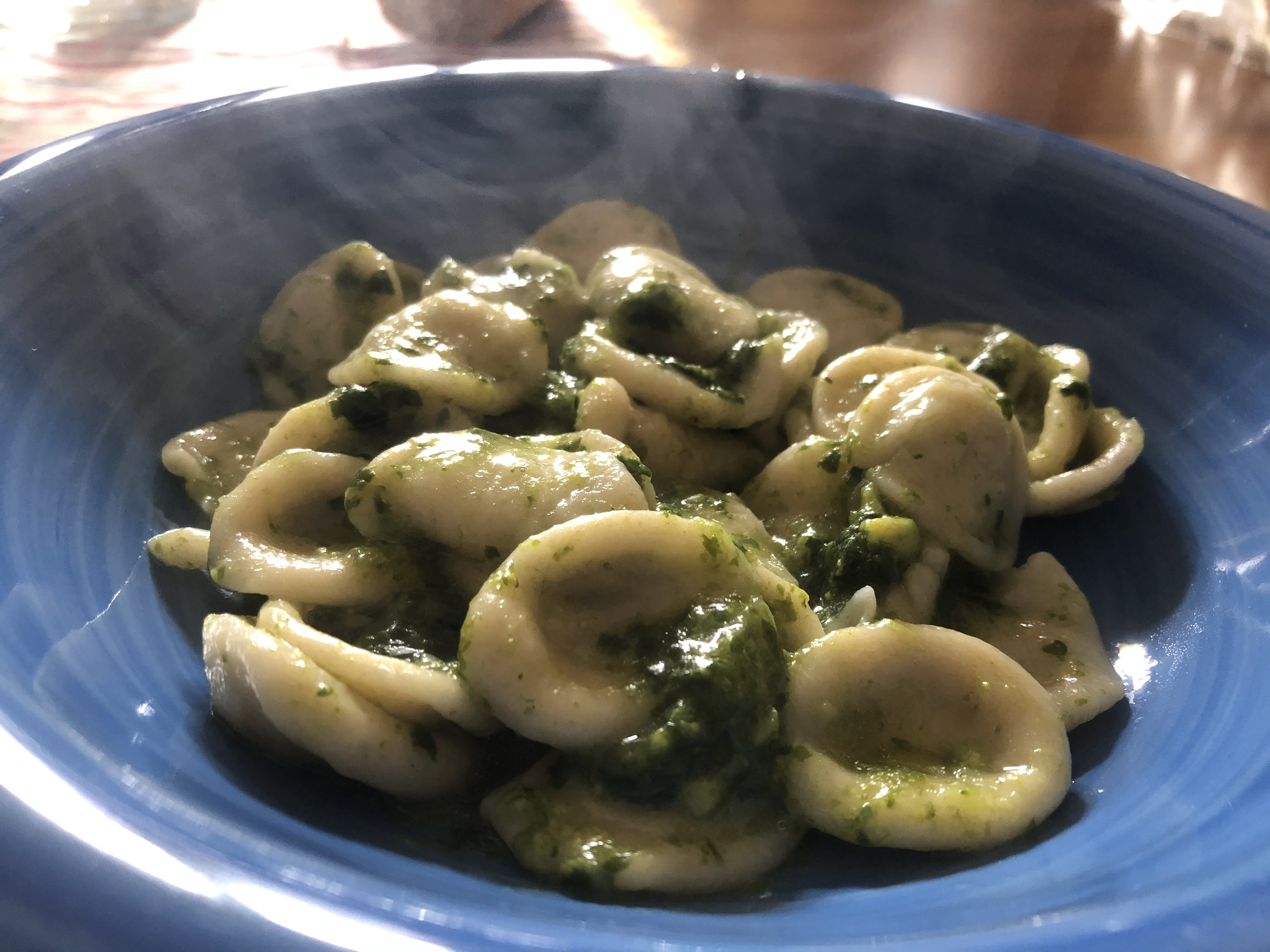
Orecchiette with cime di rapa sauce

Apulian cuisine is characterised above all by the importance given to raw materials, both land and sea, and by the fact that all the ingredients are designed to enhance and not alter the basic flavours of the products used.

Apulia is a massive food producer; major production includes wheat, tomatoes, courgette, broccoli, bell peppers, potatoes, spinach, aubergines, cauliflower, fennel, endive, chickpeas, lentils, beans, and cheese (such as caciocavallo and the famous burrata). Apulia is also the largest producer of olive oil in Italy. The sea offers abundant fish and seafood that are extensively used in the regional cuisine, especially oysters, and mussels.

Goat and lamb are occasionally used. The region is known for pasta made from durum wheat and traditional pasta dishes featuring orecchiette-style pasta, often served with tomato sauce, potatoes, mussels or broccoli rabe. Pasta with cherry tomatoes and arugula is also popular.

Regional desserts include zeppole, doughnuts usually topped with powdered sugar and filled with custard, jelly, cannoli-style pastry cream or a butter-and-honey mixture. For Christmas, Apulians make a very traditional rose-shaped pastry called cartellate. These are fried or baked and dipped in vin cotto, which is either a wine or fig juice reduction.

Among the street foods there are focaccia barese (focaccia with fresh cherry tomatoes), panzerotti (a variant of the pizza that can be baked or fried), and rustico (puff pastry with tomato, bechamel, and mozzarella cheese, popular especially in Lecce and Salento)

=== Basilicata ===
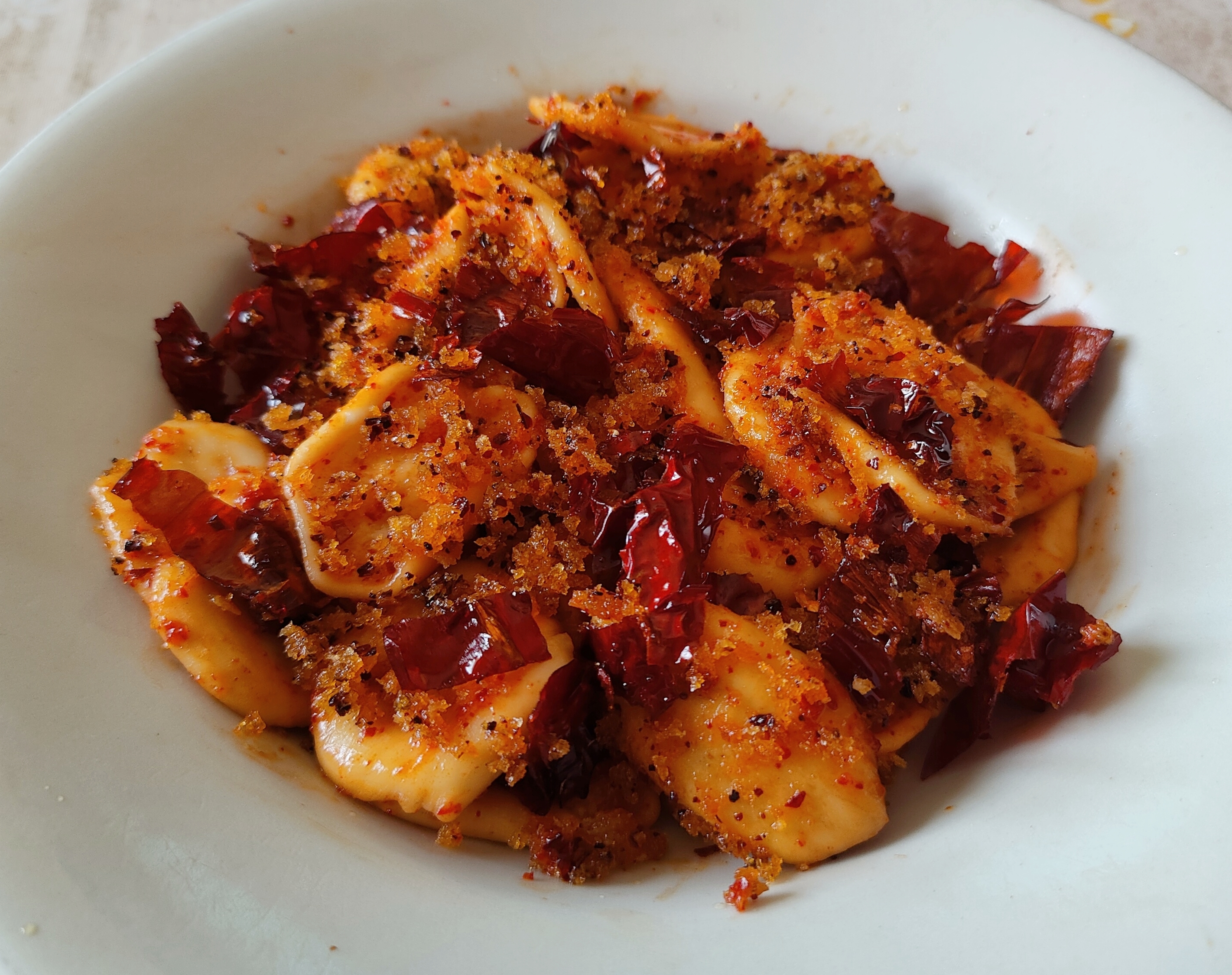
Pasta con i peperoni cruschi, a traditional dish from Basilicata

The cuisine of Basilicata is mostly based on inexpensive ingredients and deeply anchored in rural traditions.

Pork is an integral part of the regional cuisine, often made into sausages or roasted on a spit. Famous dry sausages from the region are lucanica and soppressata. Wild boar, mutton, and lamb are also popular. Pasta sauces are generally based on meats or vegetables. Horseradish is often used as a spice and condiment, known in the region as "poor man's truffle". The region produces cheeses such as pecorino di Filiano, canestrato di Moliterno, pallone di Gravina, and padraccio, and olive oils such as the Vulture. The peperone crusco (lit. 'crusco pepper') is a staple of the local cuisine, defined as the "red gold of Basilicata". It is consumed as a snack or as a main ingredient for several regional recipes.

Among the traditional dishes are pasta con i peperoni cruschi, pasta served with dried crunchy pepper and breadcrumbs; lagane e ceci, also known as piatto del brigante (lit. 'brigand's dish'), pasta prepared with chickpeas and peeled tomatoes; tumact me tulez, tagliatelle-dish of Arbëreshe culture; rafanata, a type of omelette with horseradish; ciaudedda, a vegetable stew with artichokes, potatoes, broad beans, and pancetta; and the baccalà alla lucana, one of the few recipes made with fish. Desserts include taralli dolci, made with sugar glaze and scented with anise and calzoncelli, fried pastries filled with a cream of chestnuts and chocolate.

The most famous wine of the region is the Aglianico del Vulture; others include Matera, Terre dell'Alta Val d'Agri, and Grottino di Roccanova.

Basilicata is also known for its mineral waters which are sold widely in Italy. The springs are mostly located in the volcanic basin of the Vulture area.

=== Calabria ===
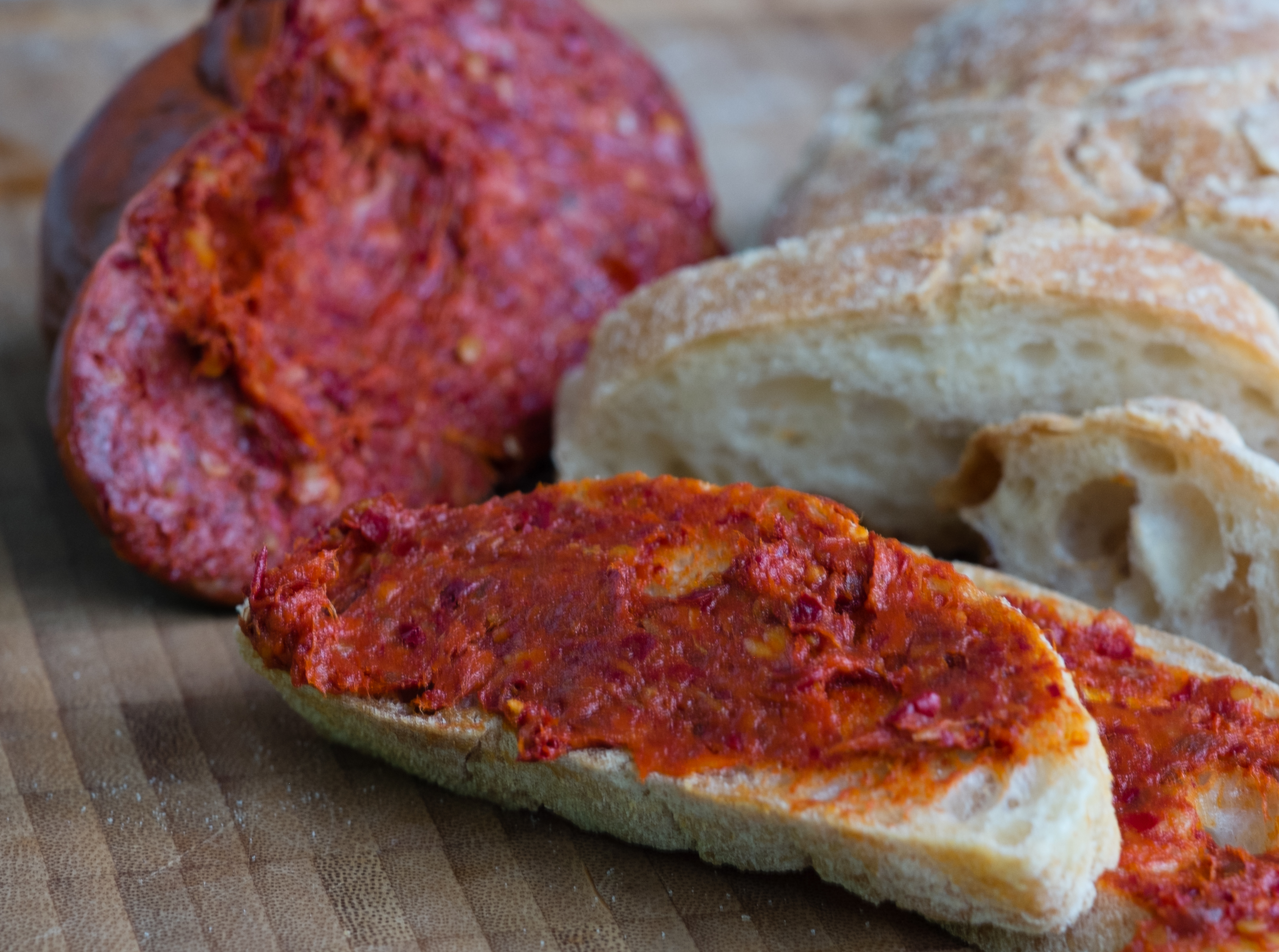
'Nduja with bread, with a piece of 'nduja sausage in the background

In Calabria, a history of French rule under the House of Anjou and Napoleon, along with Spanish influences, affected the language and culinary skills as seen in the naming of foods such as cake, gatò, from the French gateau. Seafood includes swordfish, shrimp, lobster, sea urchin, and squid. Macaroni-type pasta is widely used in regional dishes, often served with goat, beef or pork sauce, and salty ricotta cheese.

Main courses include frittuli (prepared by boiling pork rind, meat, and trimmings in pork fat), different varieties of spicy sausages (such as 'nduja and coppa), goat, and land snails. Melon and watermelon are traditionally served in a chilled fruit salad or wrapped in prosciutto. Calabrian wines include Greco di Bianco, Bivongi, Cirò, Dominici, Lamezia, Melissa, Pollino, Sant'Anna di Isola Capo Rizzuto, San Vito di Luzzi, Savuto, Scavigna, and Verbicaro.

Calabrese pizza has a Neapolitan-based structure with fresh tomato sauce and a cheese base, but is unique because of its spicy flavour. Some of the ingredients included in a Calabrese pizza are thinly sliced hot soppressata, hot coppa, hot peppers, and fresh mozzarella.

=== Campania ===
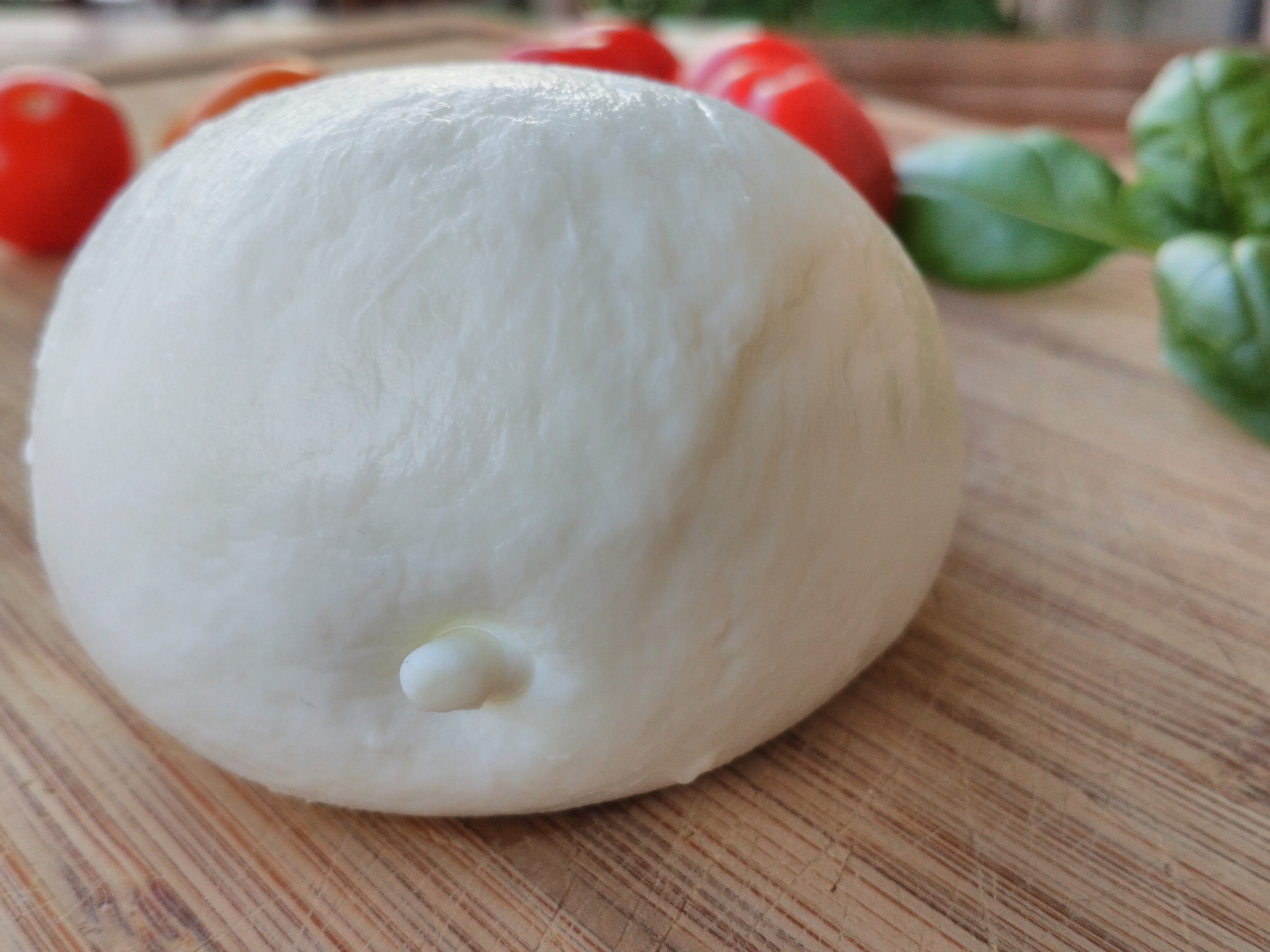
Buffalo mozzarella (Italian: mozzarella di bufala) is a dairy product traditionally made from buffalo milk in southern Italy.

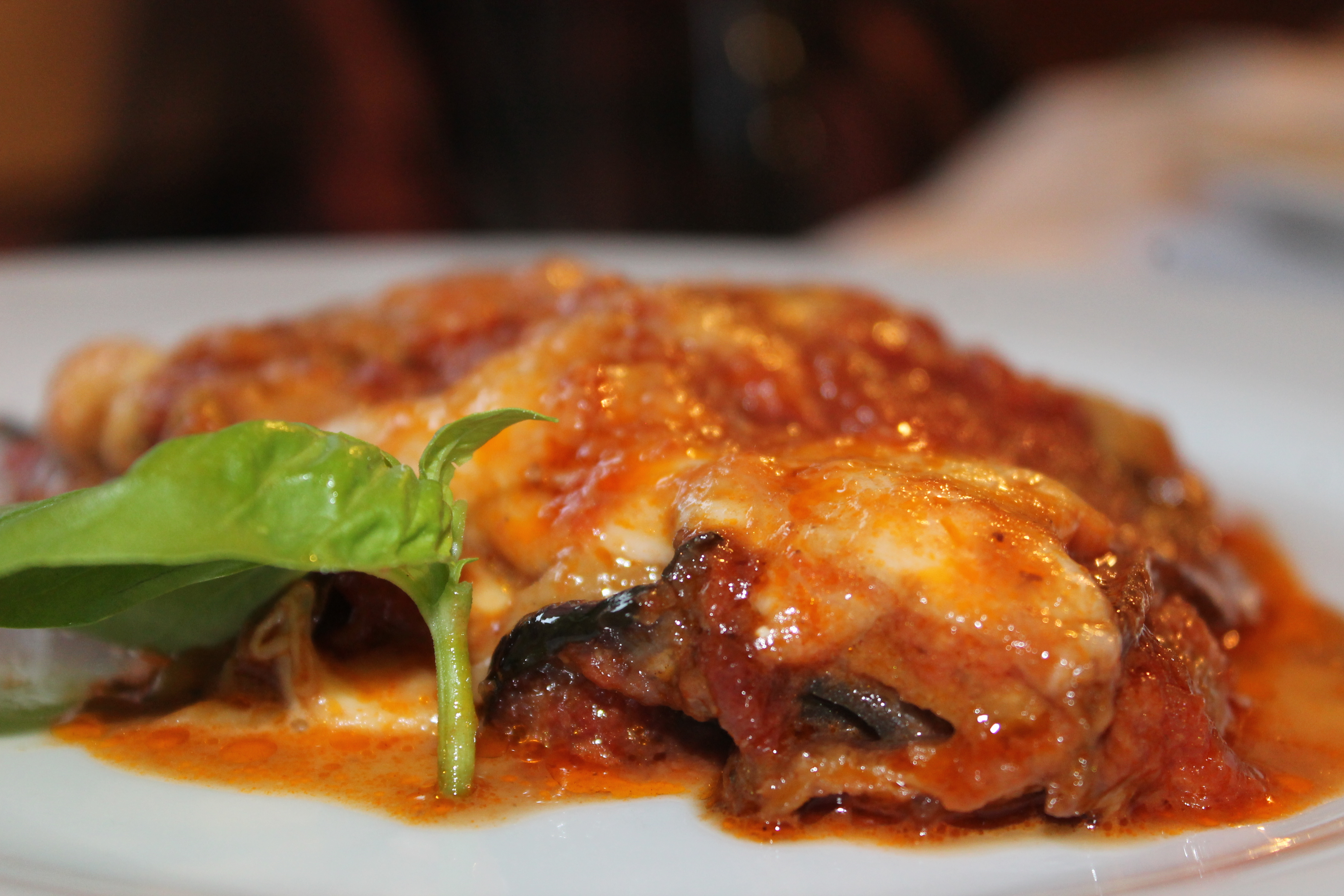
Parmigiana di melanzane

Campania extensively produces tomatoes, peppers, spring onions, potatoes, artichokes, fennel, lemons, and oranges which all take on the flavour of volcanic soil. The Gulf of Naples offers fish and seafood. Campania is one of the largest producers and consumers of pasta in Italy, especially spaghetti. In the regional cuisine, pasta is prepared in various styles that can feature tomato sauce, cheese, clams, and shellfish.

Neapolitan cuisine has ancient historical roots that date back to the Greco-Roman period, which was enriched over the centuries by the influence of the different cultures that controlled Naples and its kingdoms, such as that of Aragon and France.

Spaghetti alla puttanesca is a popular dish made with olives, tomatoes, anchovies, capers, chili peppers, and garlic. The region is well known for its mozzarella production (especially from the milk of water buffalo) that is used in a variety of dishes, including parmigiana di melanzane (shallow fried aubergine slices layered with cheese and tomato sauce, then baked). Desserts include struffoli (deep fried balls of dough), ricotta-based pastiera, sfogliatelle, torta caprese, and rum baba.

Originating in Neapolitan cuisine, pizza has become popular worldwide. Pizza is an oven-baked, flat, disc-shaped bread typically topped with a tomato sauce, cheese (usually mozzarella), and various toppings depending on the culture. Since the original pizza, several other types of pizzas have evolved.

Since Naples was the capital of the Kingdom of Two Sicilies, its cuisine took much from the culinary traditions of all the Campania region, reaching a balance between dishes based on rural ingredients (pasta, vegetables, cheese) and seafood dishes (fish, crustaceans, mollusks). A vast variety of recipes is influenced by the local aristocratic cuisine, such as timballo and sartù di riso, pasta or rice dishes with very elaborate preparation, while the dishes coming from the popular traditions contain inexpensive but nutritionally healthy ingredients, such as pasta with beans and other pasta dishes with vegetables.

Famous regional wines are Aglianico (Taurasi), Fiano, Falanghina, Lacryma Christi, Coda di Volpe dei Campi Flegrei, and Greco di Tufo.

=== Emilia-Romagna ===
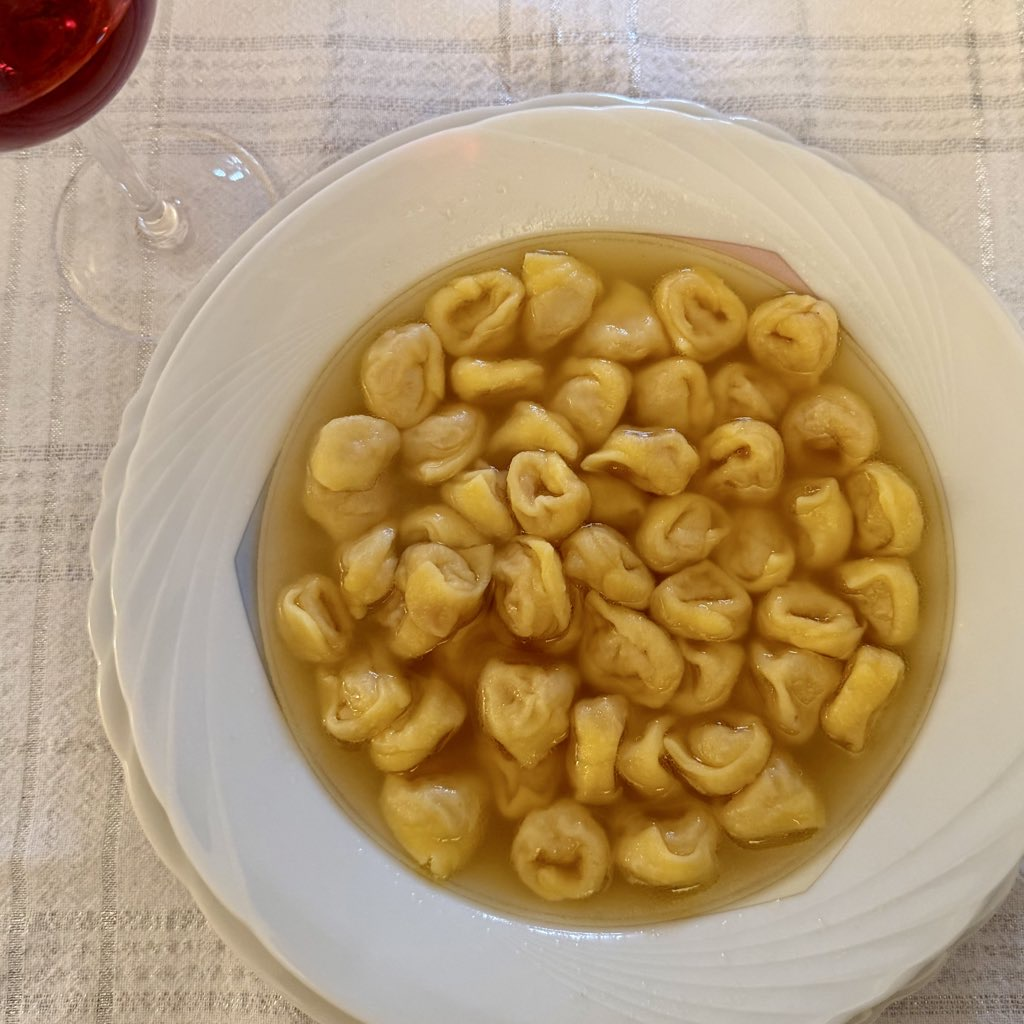
Tortellini

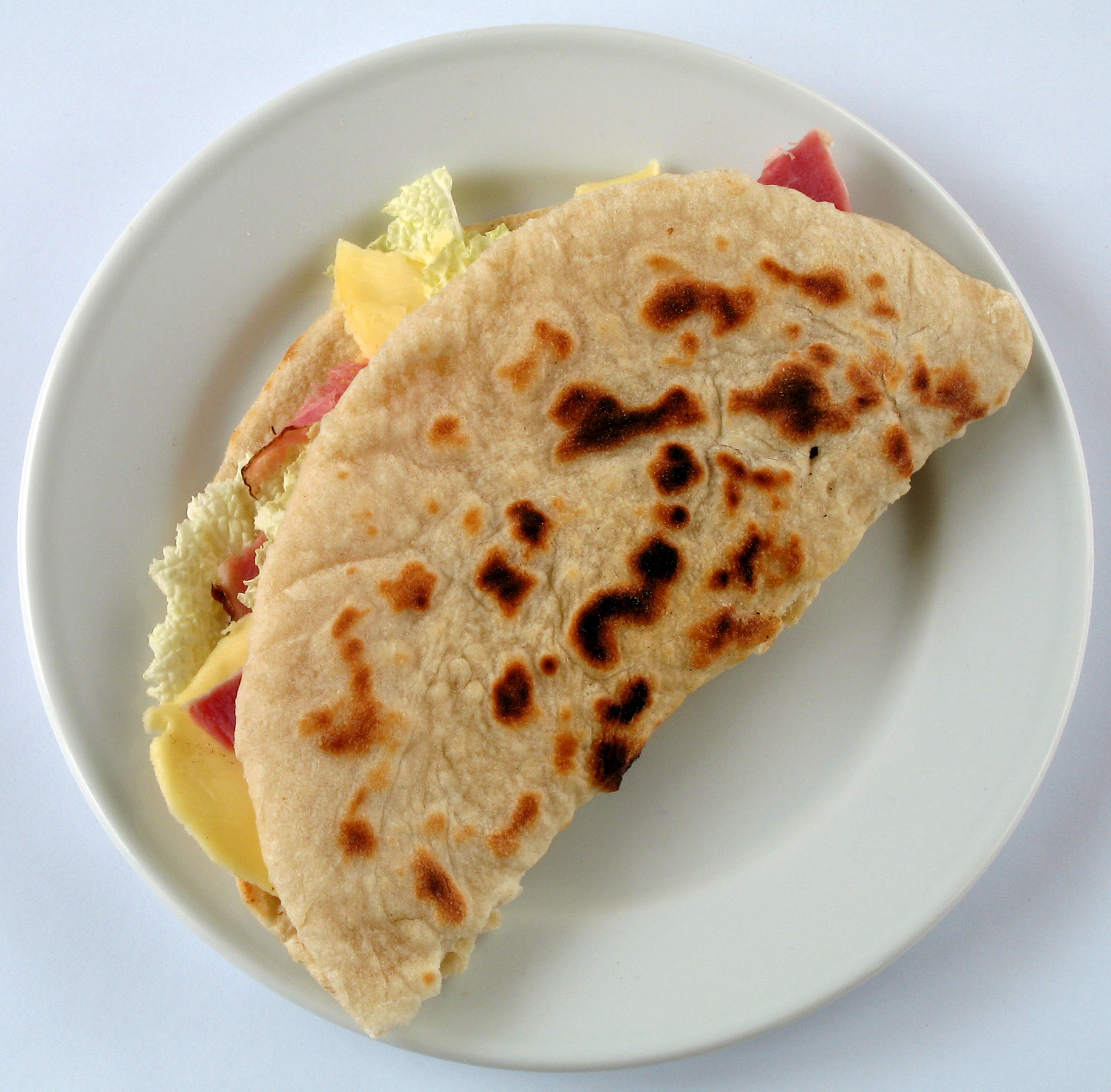
Piadina

Emilia-Romagna is especially known for its egg and filled pasta made with soft wheat flour. The Romagna subregion is renowned for pasta dishes such as cappelletti, garganelli, strozzapreti, sfoglia lorda, and tortelli alla lastra as well as cheeses such as squacquerone. piadina is also a specialty of the subregion.

Bologna and Modena are notable for pasta dishes such as tortellini, tortelloni, lasagna, gramigna, and tagliatelle, which are found also in many other parts of the region in different declinations, while Ferrara is known for cappellacci di zucca, pumpkin-filled dumplings, and Piacenza for pisarei e faśö, wheat gnocchi with beans and lard. The celebrated balsamic vinegar is made only in the Emilian cities of Modena and Reggio Emilia, following legally binding traditional procedures.

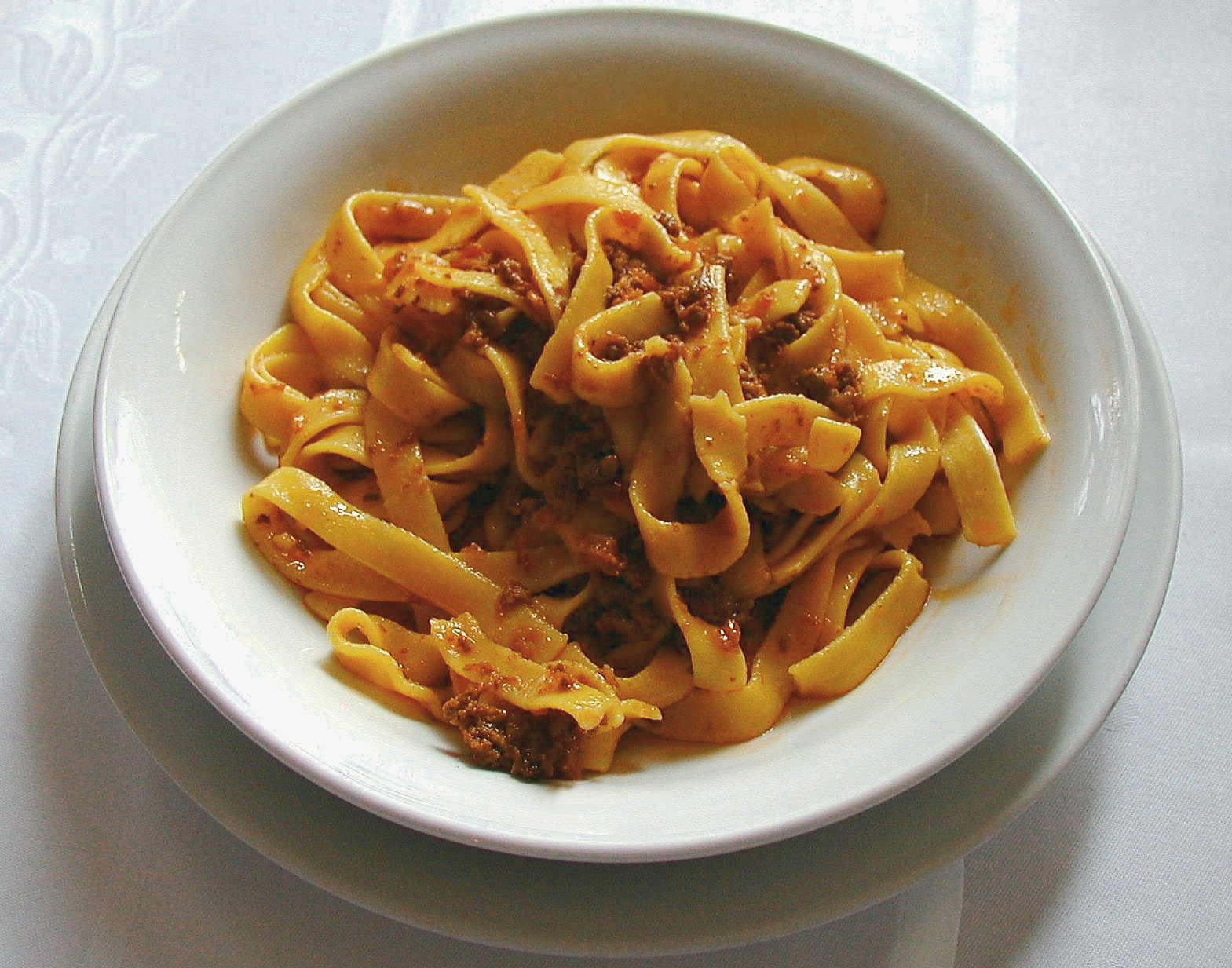
Tagliatelle with ragù

Emilian cuisine consists of the cooking traditions and practices of the Italian region of Emilia. In the Emilia subregion, except Piacenza, which is heavily influenced by the cuisines of Lombardy, rice is eaten to a lesser extent than the rest of northern Italy. Polenta, a maize-based side dish, is common in both Emilia and Romagna.

Parmigiano Reggiano and Grana Padano cheeses are produced in Reggio Emilia and Piacenza, respectively.

Although the Adriatic coast is a major fishing area (well known for its eels and clams harvested in the Valli di Comacchio), the region is more famous for its meat products, especially pork-based, that include cold cuts such as prosciutto di Parma, culatello, and salame Felino; Piacenza's pancetta, coppa, and salami; mortadella Bologna and salame rosa; zampone, cotechino, and cappello del prete; and Ferrara's salama da sugo. Piacenza is also known for some dishes prepared with horse and donkey meat. Regional desserts include zuppa inglese (custard-based dessert made with sponge cake and Alchermes liqueur), panpepato (Christmas cake made with pepper, chocolate, spices, and almonds), tenerina (butter and chocolate cake) and torta degli addobbi (rice and milk cake).

=== Friuli-Venezia Giulia ===
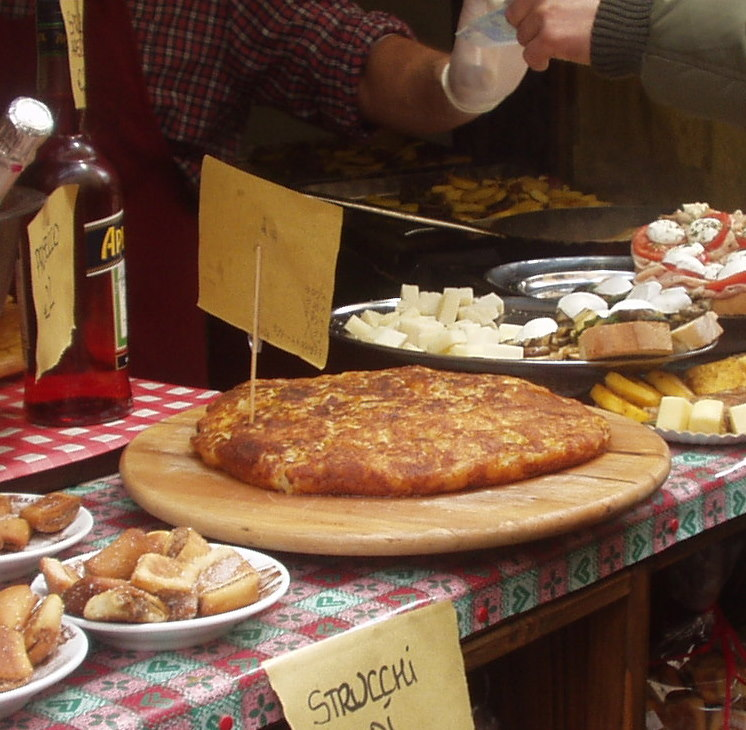
Frico, a traditional dish in the Friuli-Venezia Giulia region

The cuisine of Friuli-Venezia Giulia can vary depending on the territory, as certain areas are home to German and Slovene minorities whose local cuisine conserves greater Austro-Hungarian influences and often differs from mainstream Friulian cuisine. Udine and Pordenone, in the western part of the region, are known for their traditional prosciutto di San Daniele, Montasio cheese, cjarsons stuffed pasta, and frico. Other typical dishes are pitina (meatballs made of smoked meats), game meat, and various types of gnocchi and polenta.

Typical dishes in the eastern provinces of Gorizia and Trieste include brovada (fermented turnips), Jota (soup of beans, sauerkraut, potatoes, pancetta, and onions), local variations of goulash, apple strudel, pinza, and presnitz. Pork can be spicy and is often prepared over an open hearth called fogolar. Collio Goriziano, Friuli Isonzo, Colli Orientali del Friuli, and Ramandolo are well-known denominazione di origine controllata (DOC) regional wines.

Seafood from the Adriatic is also used in this area, mainly prepared according to Istrian and Venetian recipes. While the tuna fishing has declined, the pilchards from the Gulf of Trieste off Barcola (in the local dialect: sardoni barcolani) are a special and sought-after delicacy.

Tiramisu is a dessert linked to both Venetian and Friulian traditions. The Friulian places most frequently associated with tiramisu are Pieris, in the province of Gorizia, and Tolmezzo, in the province of Udine.

=== Lazio ===
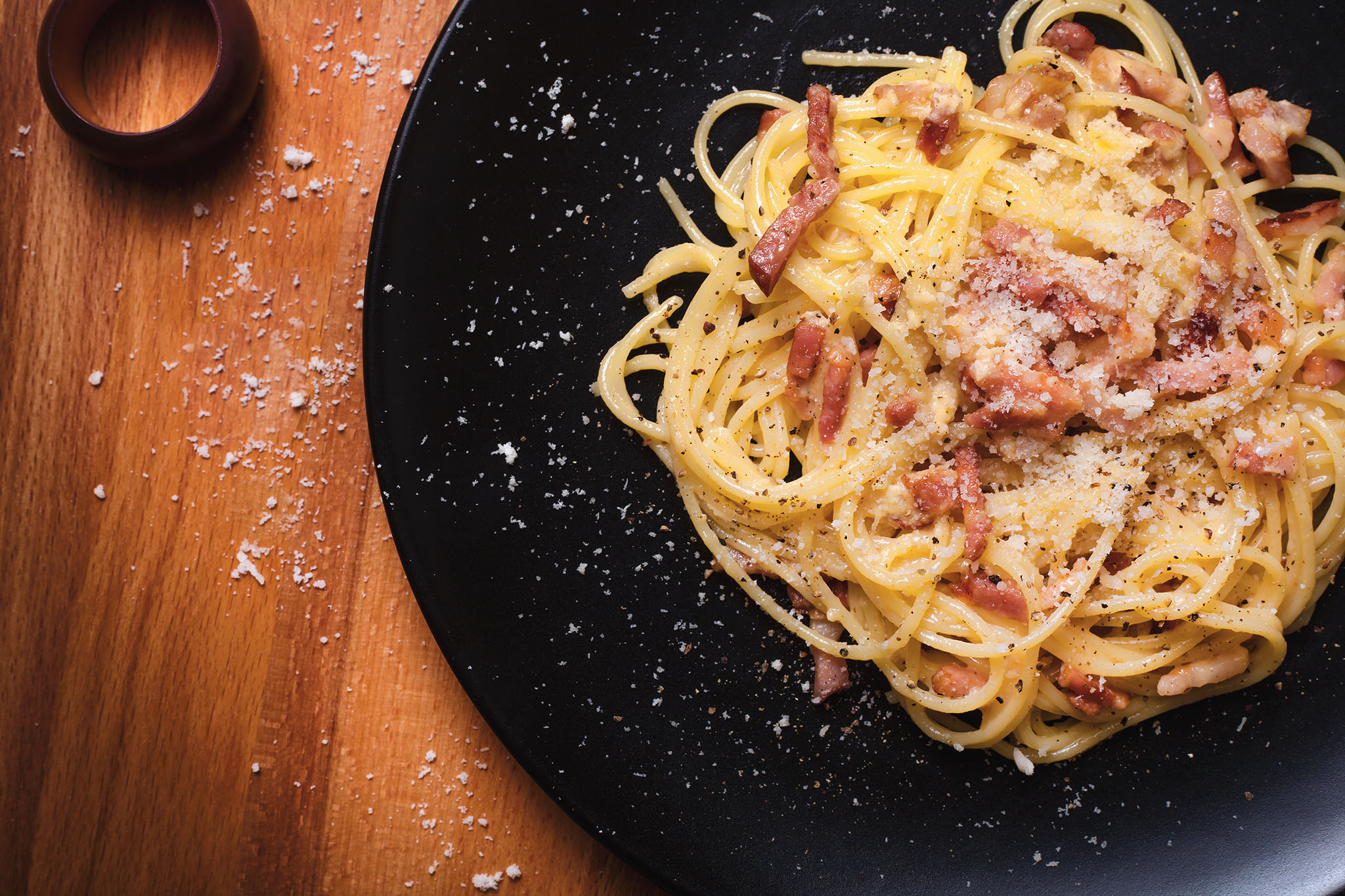
Spaghetti alla carbonara

It features fresh, seasonal and simply prepared ingredients from Roman Campagna. These include peas, globe artichokes and fava beans, shellfish, milk-fed lamb and goat, and cheeses such as pecorino romano and ricotta. Olive oil is used mostly to dress raw vegetables, while strutto (pork lard) and fat from prosciutto are preferred for frying. The most popular sweets in Rome are small individual pastries called pasticcini Special dishes are often reserved for different days of the week; for example, gnocchi is eaten on Thursdays, baccalà (salted cod) on Fridays, and trippa (lit. 'tripe') on Saturdays.

Pasta dishes based on the use of guanciale (unsmoked bacon prepared with pig's jowl or cheeks) are often found in Lazio, such as carbonara pasta and amatriciana pasta. Another pasta dish of the region is arrabbiata, with spicy tomato sauce. The regional cuisine widely use offal, resulting in dishes such as the entrail-based rigatoni with pajata sauce and coda alla vaccinara. Abbacchio is a meat dish based on lamb from the Roman cuisine.

Iconic of Lazio is cheese made from ewes' milk (pecorino romano), porchetta (savory, fatty, and moist boneless pork roast), and Frascati white wine. The influence of the ancient Jewish community can be noticed in the Roman cuisine's traditional carciofi alla giudia.

=== Liguria ===
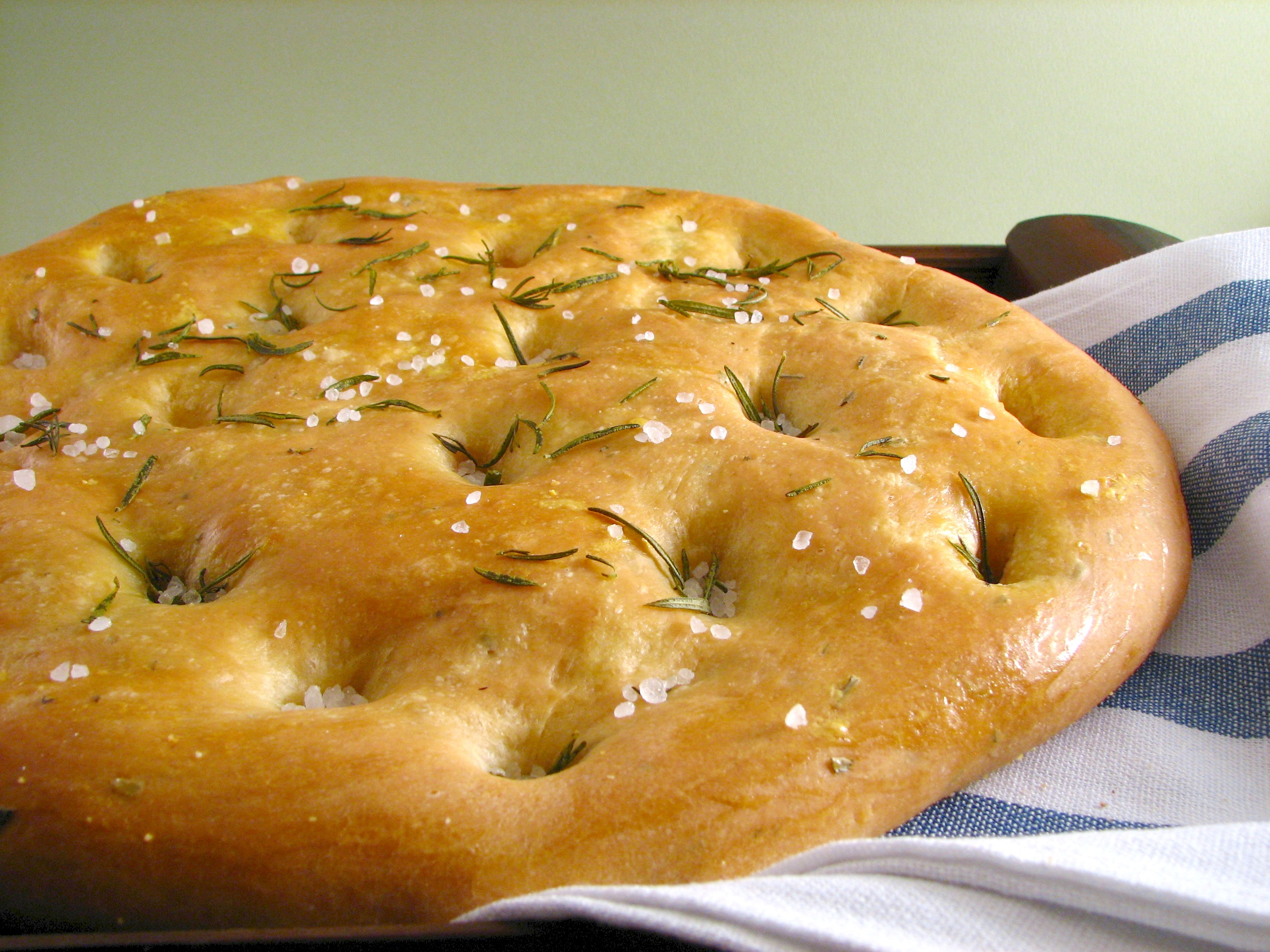
Focaccia with rosemary. Focaccia is widely associated with Ligurian cuisine.

Ligurian cuisine uses ingredients linked both to local production (such as preboggión, a mixture of wild herbs), and to imports from areas with which, over the centuries, the Ligurians have had frequent trade (such as pecorino sardo, one of the ingredients of pesto).

Liguria is known for herbs and vegetables (as well as seafood) in its cuisine. Savory pies are popular, mixing greens and artichokes along with cheeses, milk curds, and eggs. Onions and olive oil are used. Due to a lack of land suitable for wheat, the Ligurians use chickpeas in farinata and polenta-like panissa. The former is served plain or topped with onions, artichokes, sausages, cheese or young anchovies. Farinata is typically cooked in a wood-fired oven, similar to southern pizzas. Fresh fish also features heavily in Ligurian cuisine. Baccalà (salted cod) is a prominent source of protein in coastal regions; it is traditionally prepared in a soup.

Hilly districts use chestnuts as a source of carbohydrates. Ligurian pastas include corzetti, typically stamped with traditional designs, from the Polcevera Valley; pansoti, triangle-shaped ravioli filled with vegetables; piccagge, pasta ribbons made with a small amount of egg and served with artichoke sauce or pesto sauce; trenette, made from whole wheat flour cut into long strips and served with pesto; boiled beans and potatoes; and trofie. Many Ligurians emigrated to Argentina in the late 19th and early 20th centuries, influencing Argentinian cuisine, which was otherwise dominated by meat and dairy products that the narrow Ligurian hinterland's agricultural capacity would not have allowed. Pesto, sauce made from basil and other herbs, is uniquely Ligurian, and frequently accompanies Ligurian pastas.

=== Lombardy ===
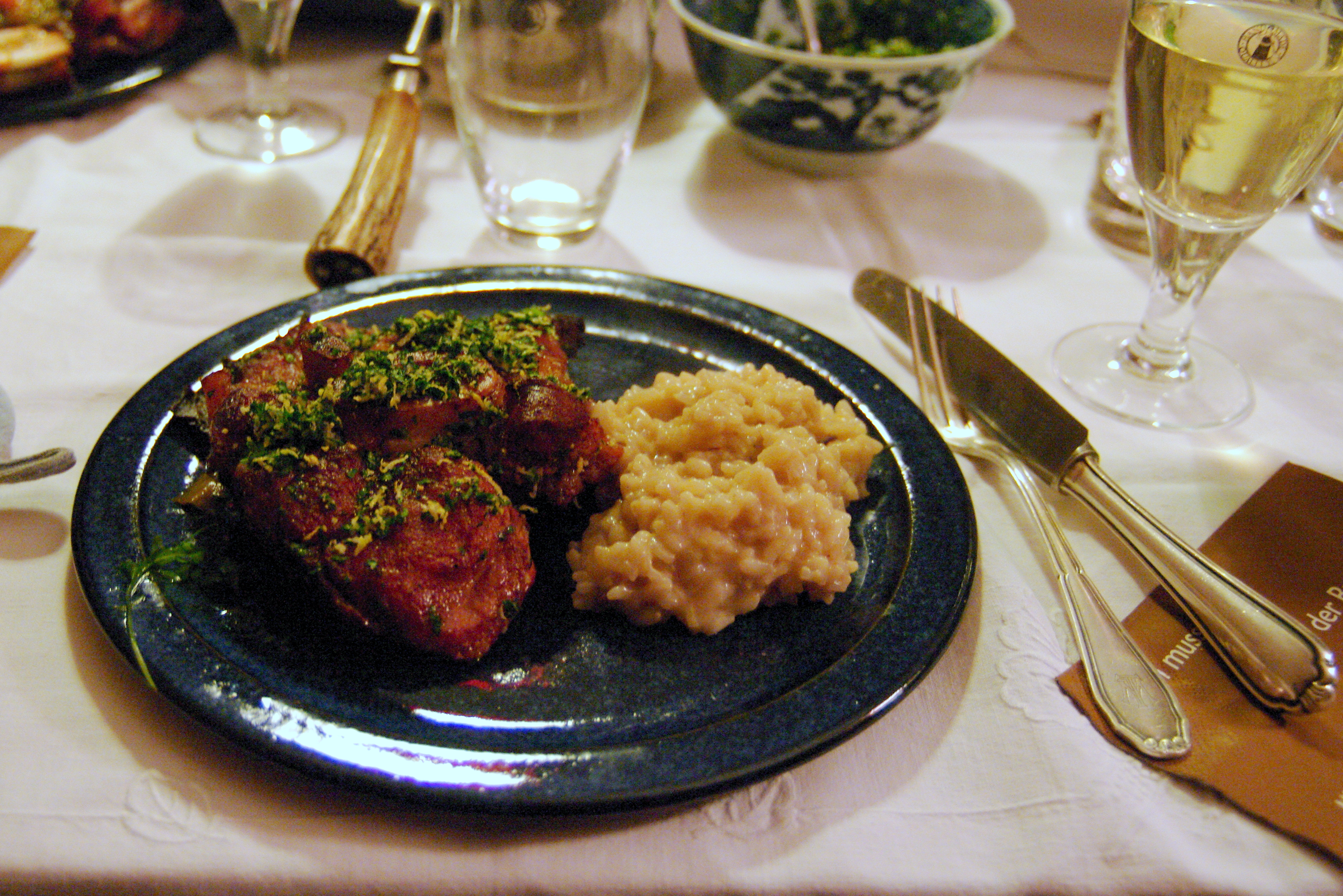
Ossobuco served with risotto alla milanese

Due to the different historical events of its provinces and the variety of its territory, Lombard cuisine has a very varied culinary tradition. First courses in Lombard cuisine range from risotto, to soups and stuffed pasta, in broth or not. Main courses offer a variegated choice of meat or fish dishes of the tradition of the many lakes and rivers of Lombardy.

In general, the cuisine of the various provinces of Lombardy can be united by the prevalence of rice and stuffed pasta over dry pasta, butter instead of olive oil for cooking, prolonged cooking, the widespread use of pork, milk and derivatives, egg-based preparations, and the consumption of polenta that is common to all of northern Italy.

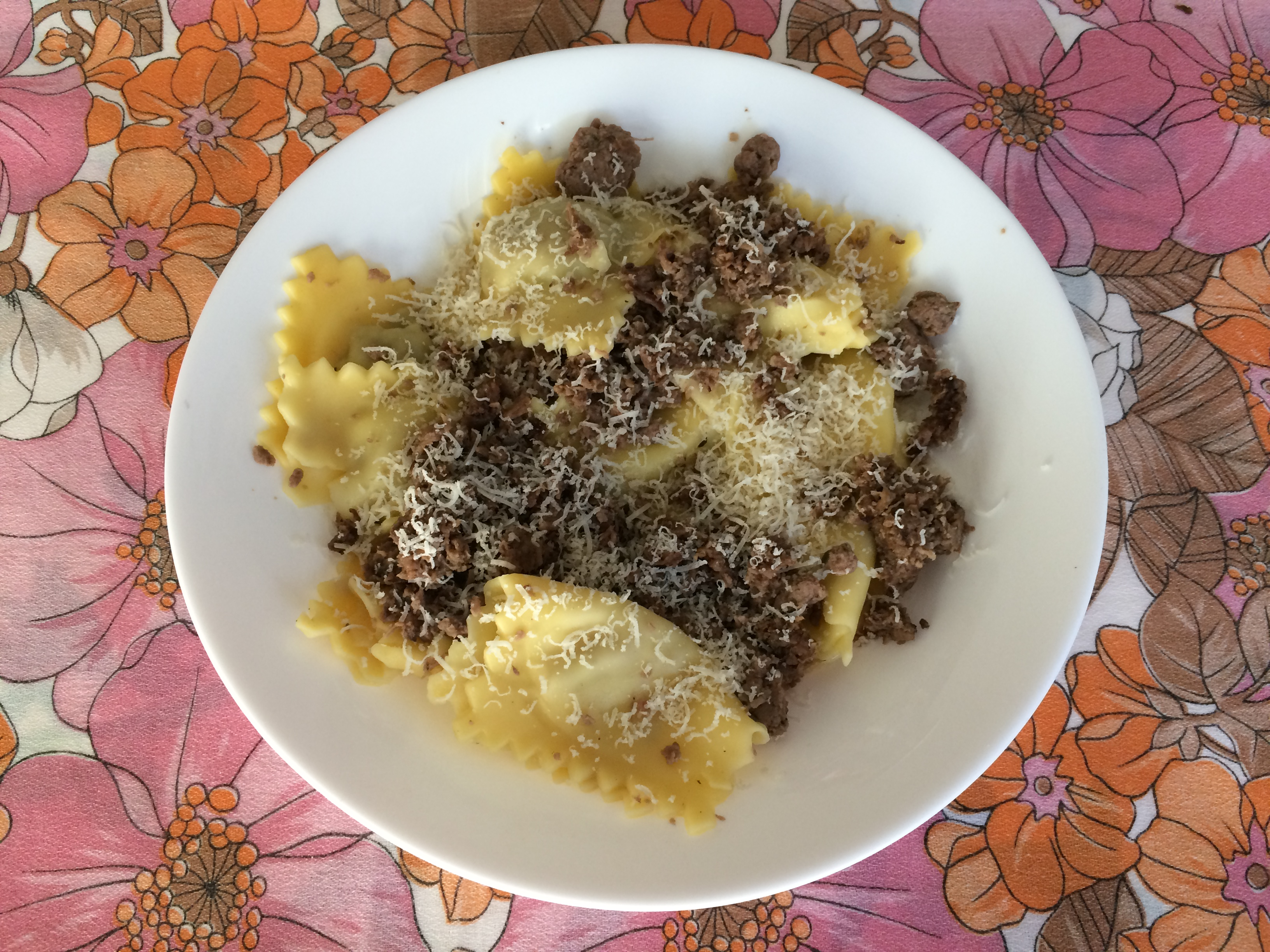
A plate of dry agnolotti pavesi, with a Pavese stew-based sauce

Rice dishes are very popular in this region, often found in soups as well as risotto. The best-known version is risotto alla milanese, flavoured with saffron. Due to its characteristic yellow colour, it is often called risotto giallo. The dish is sometimes served with ossobuco (cross-cut veal shanks braised with vegetables, white wine and broth).

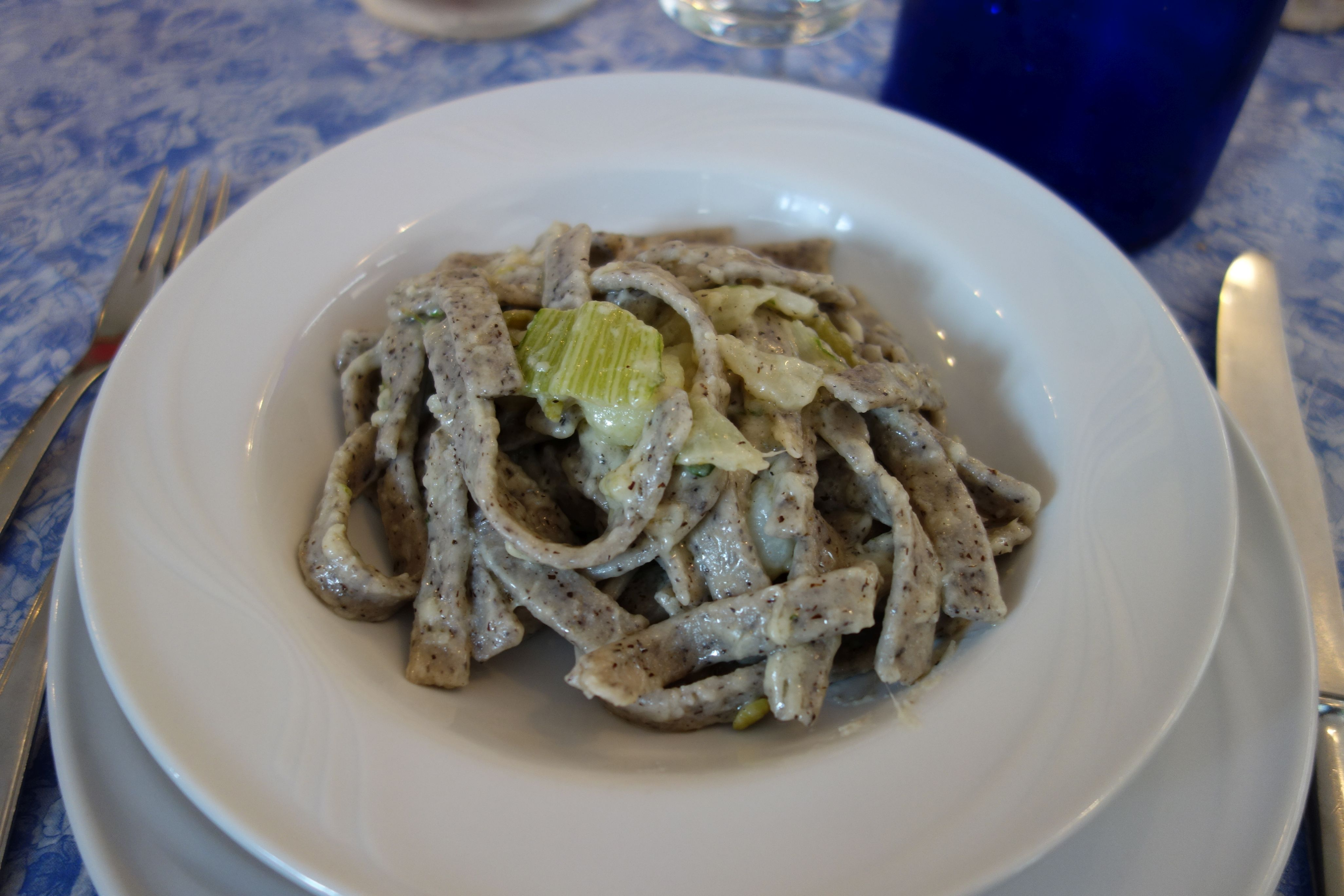
A dish of pizzoccheri

Other regional specialties include cotoletta alla milanese (a fried breaded cutlet of veal similar to Wiener schnitzel, but cooked "bone-in"), cassoeula (a typically winter dish prepared with cabbage and pork), mostarda (rich condiment made with candied fruit and a mustard flavoured syrup), Valtellina's bresaola (air-dried salted beef), pizzoccheri (a flat ribbon pasta made with 80% buckwheat flour and 20% wheat flour cooked along with greens, cubed potatoes, and layered with pieces of Valtellina Casera cheese), agnolotti pavesi (a type of ravioli with Pavese stew filling), casoncelli (a type of stuffed pasta, usually garnished with melted butter and sage, typical of Bergamo and Brescia), and tortelli di zucca (a type of ravioli with pumpkin filling, usually garnished with melted butter and sage or tomato).

Common in the whole Insubria area are bruscitti, originating from Alto Milanese, which consist in a braised meat dish cut very thin and cooked in wine and fennel seeds, historically obtained by stripping leftover meat. Regional cheeses include Grana Padano, Gorgonzola, crescenza, robiola, and Taleggio (the plains of central and southern Lombardy allow intensive cattle farming). Polenta is common across the region. Regional desserts include the famous panettone (soft sweet bread with raisins and candied citron and orange chunks).

=== Marche ===
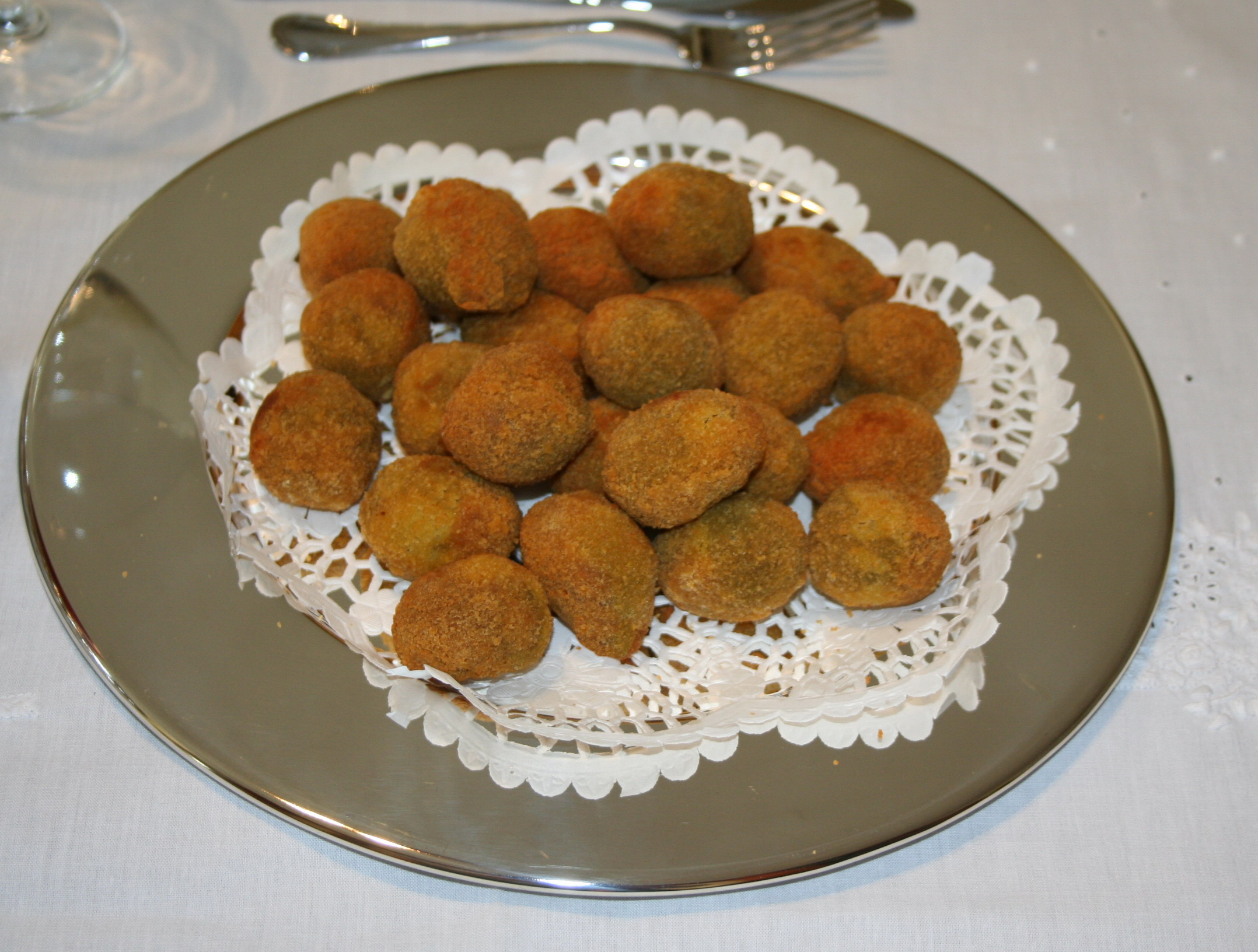
Olive all'ascolana

On the coast of Marche, fish and seafood are produced. Inland, wild and domestic pigs are used for sausages and prosciuttos. These prosciuttos are not thinly sliced, but cut into bite-sized chunks. Suckling pig, chicken, and fish are often stuffed with rosemary or fennel fronds and garlic before being roasted or placed on the spit.

Ascoli, Marche's southernmost province, is well known for olive all'ascolana (stoned olives stuffed with several minced meats, egg, and Parmigiano Reggiano cheese, then fried). Another well-known Marche product are the maccheroncini di Campofilone, from little town of Campofilone, a type of hand-made pasta made only of hard grain flour and eggs, cut so thin that melts in one's mouth.

=== Piedmont ===
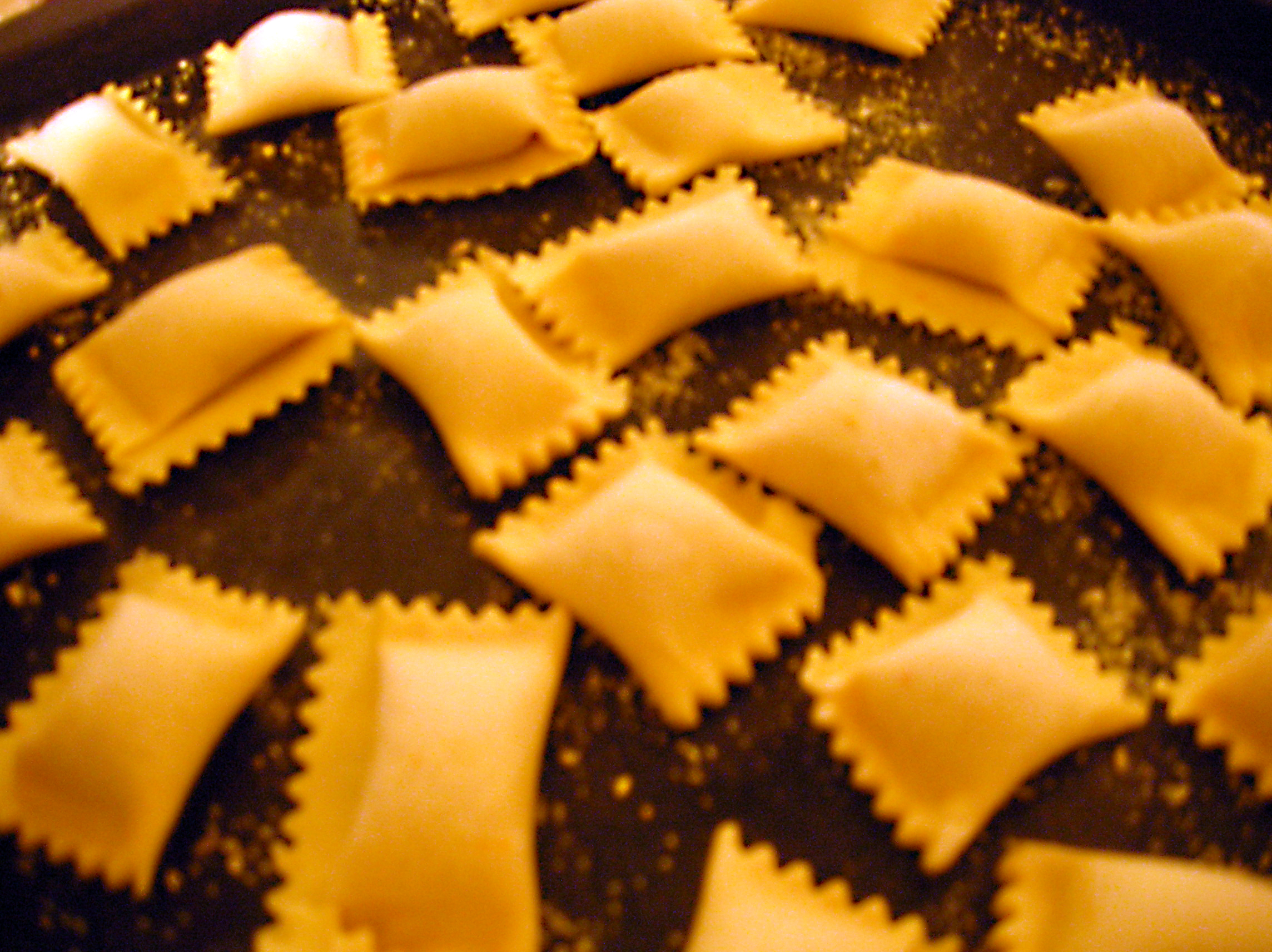
Traditional Piedmontese agnolotti

Piedmontese cuisine is partly influenced by French cuisine; this is demonstrated in particular by the importance of appetisers, a set of courses that precede what is traditionally called "first course" and aimed at whetting the appetite. In France these courses are fewer and are called entrée.

Between the Alps and the Po Valley, featuring a large number of different ecosystems, the Piedmont region offers a refined and varied cuisine. As a point of union between traditional Italian and French cuisine, Piedmont is the Italian region with the largest number of cheeses with protected geographical status and wines under DOC. It is also the region where both the Slow Food association and the most prestigious school of Italian cooking, the University of Gastronomic Sciences, were founded.

Piedmont is a region where gathering nuts, mushrooms, and cardoons, as well as hunting and fishing, are commonplace. Truffles, garlic, seasonal vegetables, cheese, and rice feature in the cuisine. Wines from the Nebbiolo grape such as Barolo and Barbaresco are produced as well as wines from the Barbera grape, fine sparkling wines, and the sweet, lightly sparkling, Moscato d'Asti. The region is also famous for its Vermouth and Ratafia production.

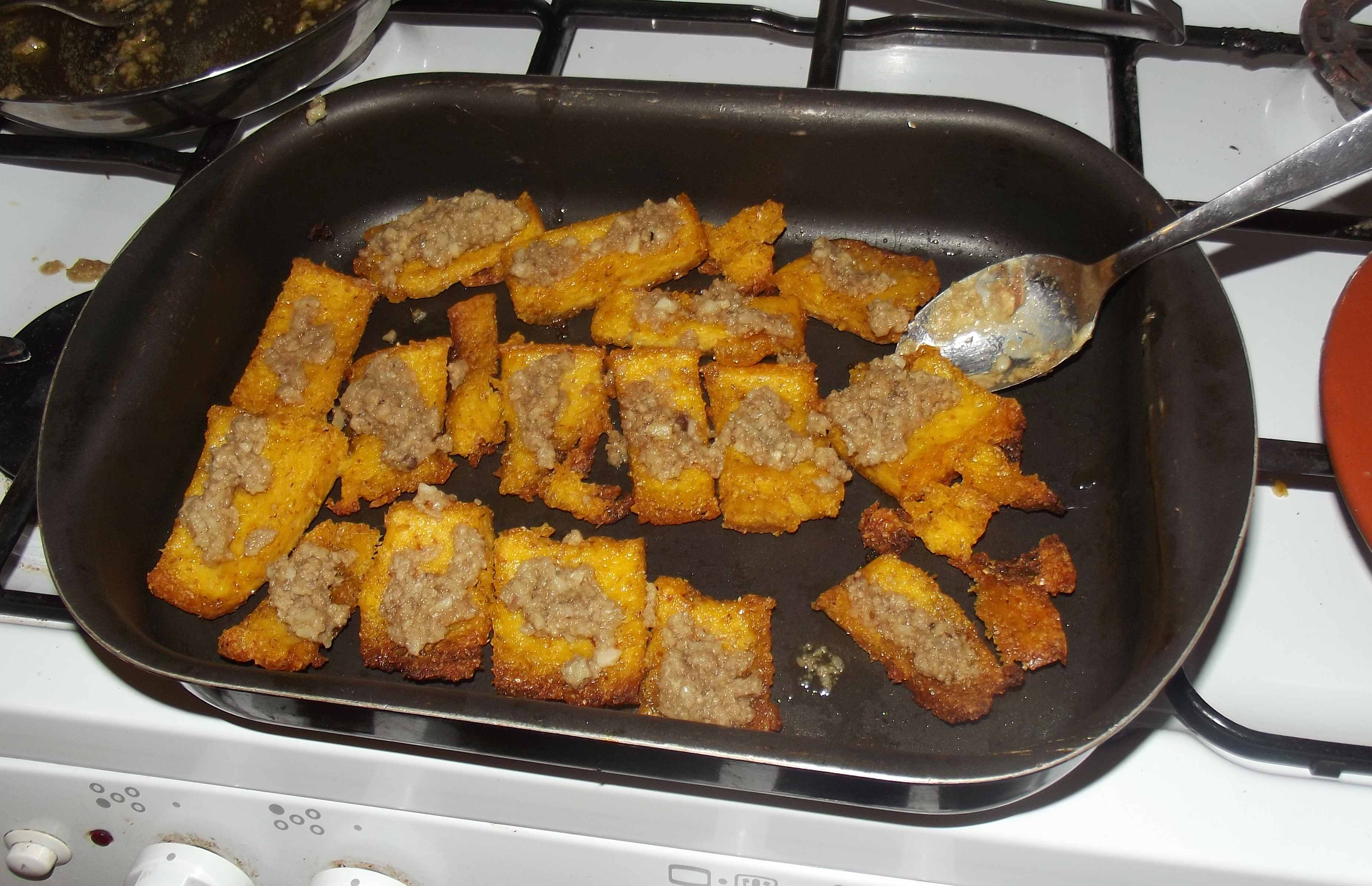
Polenta with bagna càuda

Castelmagno is a prized cheese of the region. Piedmont is also famous for the quality of its Carrù beef (particularly bue grasso, lit. 'fat ox'), hence the tradition of eating raw meat seasoned with garlic oil, lemon, and salt; carpaccio; brasato al vino, wine stew made from marinated beef; and boiled beef served with various sauces.

The food most typical of the Piedmont tradition are agnolotti (pasta folded over with roast beef and vegetable stuffing), paniscia (a typical dish of Novara, a type of risotto with Arborio rice or Maratelli rice, the typical kind of Saluggia beans, onion, Barbera wine, lard, salami, season vegetables, salt, and pepper), taglierini (thinner version of tagliatelle), bagna càuda (sauce of garlic, anchovies, olive oil, and butter), and bicerin (hot drink made of coffee, chocolate, and whole milk). Piedmont is one of the Italian capitals of pastry and chocolate in particular, with products such as Nutella, gianduiotto, and marron glacé that are famous worldwide.

=== Sardinia ===
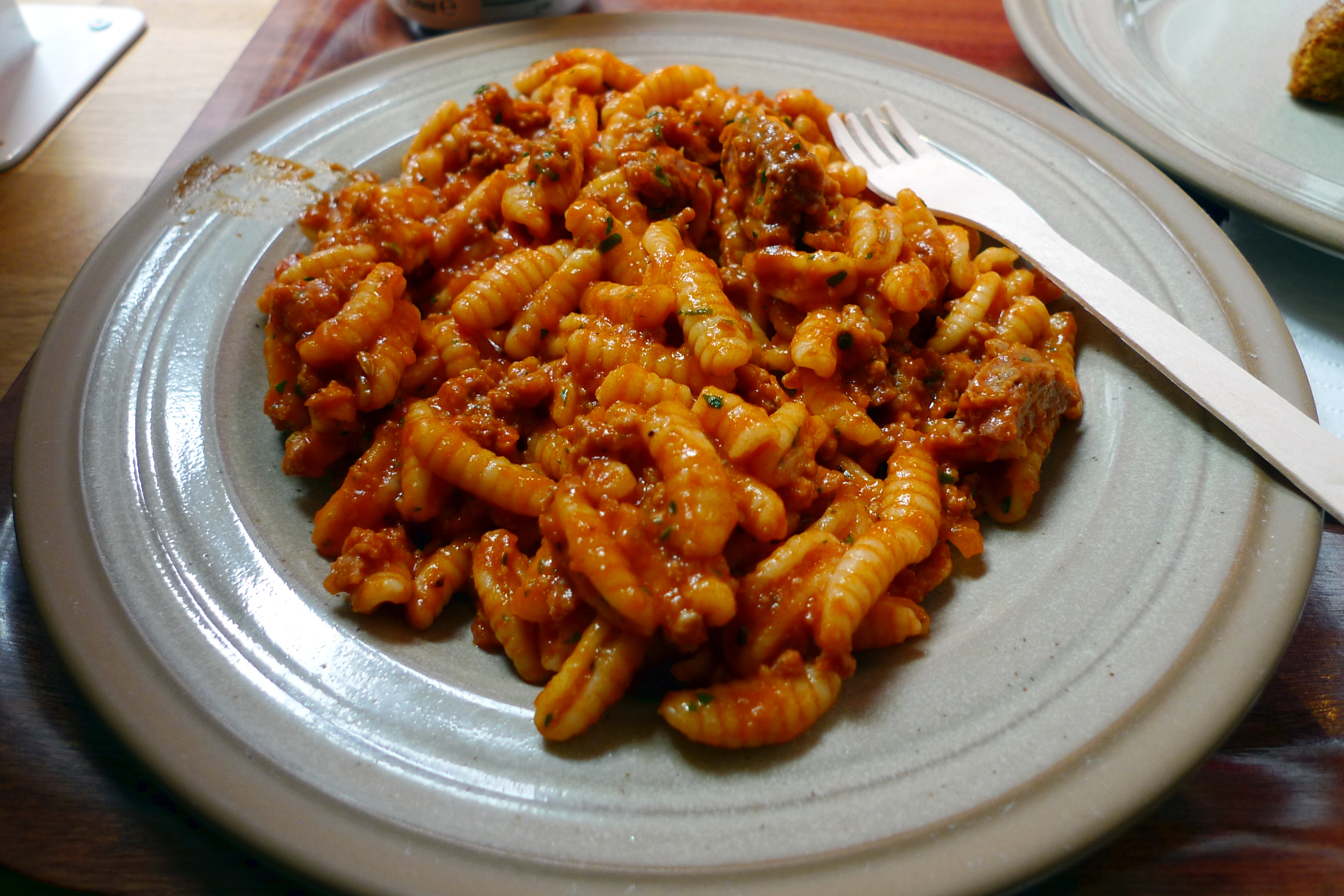
Malloreddus pasta

The cuisine of Sardinia is characterised by its own variety and by the fact of having been enriched through a number of interactions with the other Mediterranean cultures while retaining its own identity.

Suckling pig and wild boar are roasted on the spit or boiled in stews of beans and vegetables, thickened with bread. Herbs such as mint and myrtle are widely used in the regional cuisine. Sardinia also has many special types of bread, made dry, which keeps longer than high-moisture breads. Malloreddus is a typical pasta of the region.

Also baked are carasau bread, civraxu bread, coccoi a pitzus, a highly decorative bread, and pistocu bread, made with flour and water only, originally meant for herders, but often served at home with tomatoes, basil, oregano, garlic, and a strong cheese. Rock lobster, scampi, squid, tuna, and sardines are the predominant seafoods.

Casu marzu is a sheep's cheese produced in Sardinia, but is of questionable legality due to hygiene concerns.

=== Sicily ===
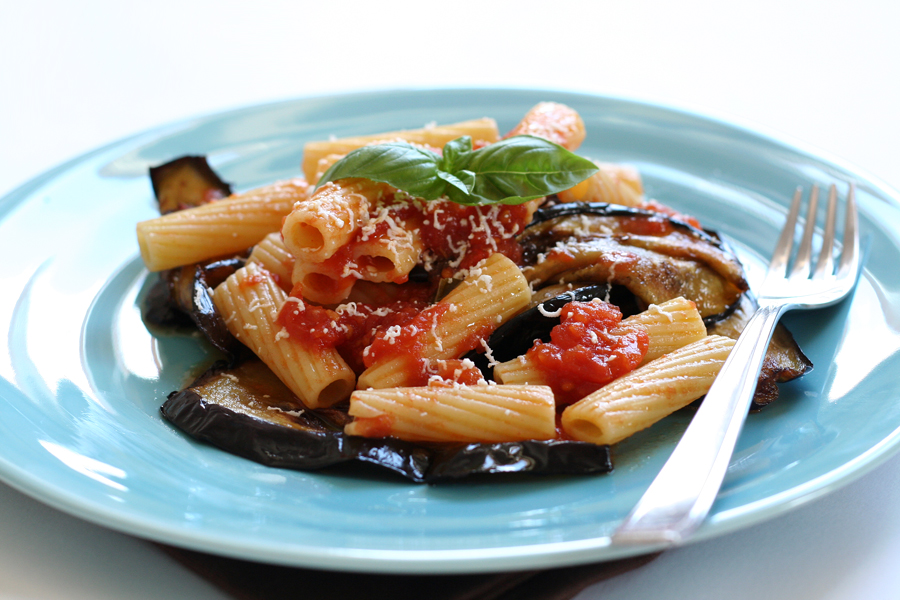
Pasta alla Norma is amongst Sicily's most historic and iconic dishes.

Sicilian cuisine shows traces of all cultures that have existed on the island of Sicily over the last two millennia. Although its cuisine has much in common with Italian cuisine, Sicilian food also has Greek, Spanish, Jewish, Maghrebi, and Arab influences. The Sicilian cook Mithaecus, born during 5th century BC, is credited with having brought knowledge of Sicilian gastronomy to Greece: his cookbook was the first in Greek, therefore he was the earliest cookbook author in any language whose name is known.

Sicily shows traces of all the cultures which established themselves on the island over the last two millennia. Although its cuisine undoubtedly has a predominantly Italian base, Sicilian food also has Spanish, Greek, and Arab influences. The ancient Romans introduced lavish dishes based on goose. The Byzantines favoured sweet and sour flavours and the Arabs brought sugar, citrus, rice, spinach, and saffron. The Normans and Hohenstaufens had a fondness for meat dishes. The Spanish introduced items from the New World including chocolate, maize, turkey, and tomatoes. Sicilian cuisine not only reflects a mix of historical influences, but also embodies traditions that have been preserved through the use of local ingredients and age-old techniques, particularly in dishes such as arancini and cassata, which showcase the island's unique culinary heritage.

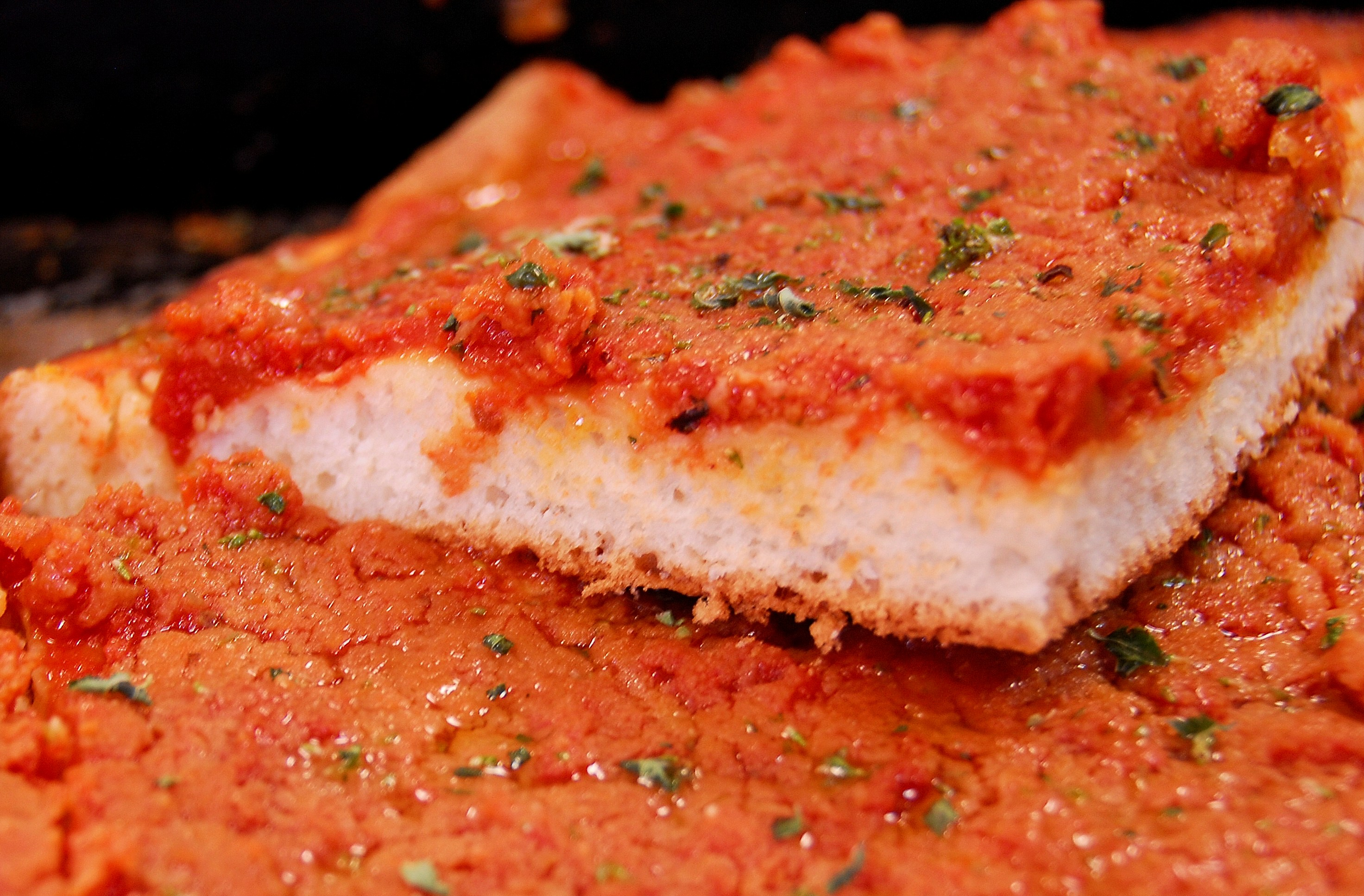
Sicilian pizza

Much of the island's cuisine encourages the use of fresh vegetables such as aubergine, peppers, and tomatoes, as well as fish such as tuna, seabream, sea bass, swordfish, and cuttlefish. In Trapani, in the extreme western corner of the island, North African influences are clear in the use of various couscous based dishes, usually combined with fish. Mint is used extensively in cooking unlike the rest of Italy.

Traditional specialties from Sicily include arancini (a form of deep-fried rice croquettes), pasta alla Norma, caponata, pani câ meusa, and a host of desserts and sweets such as cannoli, granita, and cassata.

Typical of Sicily is Marsala, a red, fortified wine similar to Port and largely exported.

=== Trentino-Alto Adige ===
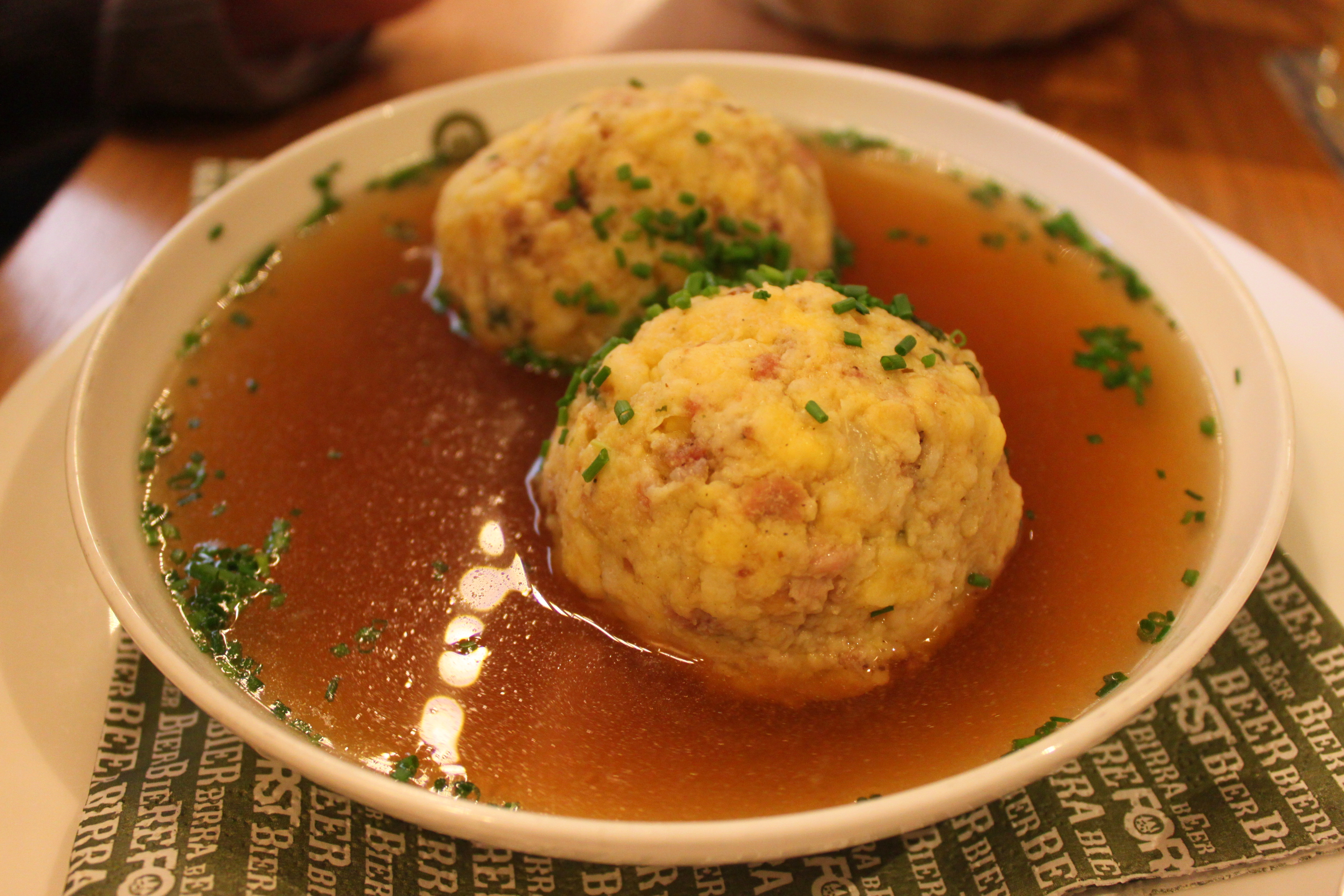
Traditional speck knödel soup. The cuisine of South Tyrol combines culinary influences from Italy and the Mediterranean with a strong alpine regional and Austrian influence.

The cuisine of South Tyrol—the northern half of the Trentino-Alto Adige region—combines culinary influences from Italy and the Mediterranean with a strong alpine regional and Austrian influence. Before the Council of Trent in the middle of the 16th century, the region was known for the simplicity of its peasant cuisine. When the prelates of the Catholic Church established there, they brought the art of fine cooking with them. Later, also influences from the Republic of Venice and the Austrian Habsburg Empire came in.

The most renowned local product is traditional speck juniper-flavoured prosciutto which, as speck Alto Adige, is regulated by the European Union under the PGI status. Goulash, knödel, apple strudel, kaiserschmarrn, krapfen, rösti, spätzle, and rye bread are regular dishes, along with potatoes, dumpling, homemade sauerkraut, and lard. Since the 20th century the cuisine has come under the influence of other Italian regions, so that various pizza and pasta dishes have become staples. This fusion has led to the creation of dishes such as pasta with speck cream sauce and baked apple rings. The territory of Bolzano is also reputed for its Müller-Thurgau white wines.

The cuisine of the Trentino subregion leans more towards Veneto. It is influenced by its geographical position which ranges from isolated Alpine valleys to the southern prealpine lakes. The cuisine is characterised by its peasant dishes and especially the wide presence of soups. Trentino produces various types of sausages, polenta, yogurt, cheese, gnocchi, buckwheat, potato cake, funnel cake, and freshwater fish. Typical dishes from Trentino include zuppa d'orzo (barley soup), canederli (bread dumplings), strangolapreti (spinach gnocchi), smacafam (savory Carnival pie), panada (bread soup), brö brusà (toasted soup), tortel di patate (potato pancakes), and risotto with Teroldego. Trentino's protected products include its Non Valley apples.

=== Tuscany ===
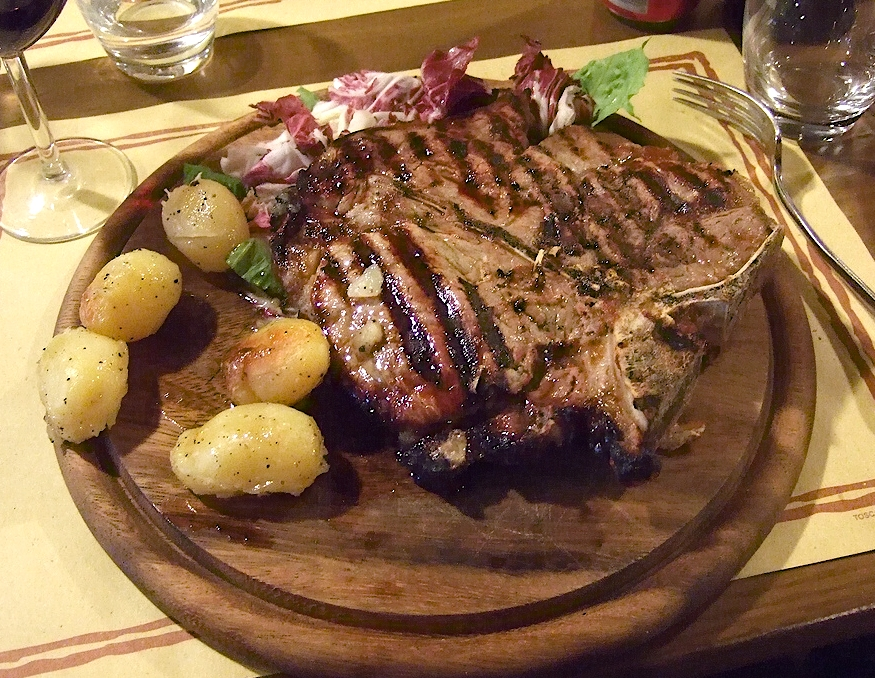
Bistecca alla fiorentina

Tuscan cuisine is celebrated for its simplicity and focus on fresh ingredients such as olive oil, legumes, and meats. Simplicity is central to this cuisine.

Some of Tuscany's classic dishes are rooted in cucina povera ('cuisine of the poor'), a cuisine that emphasises seasonal ingredients and straightforward flavours over complex sauces and spices. One example is ribollita, a notable soup whose name literally means 'reboiled'. Ribollita was originally made by reheating (i.e. reboiling) the leftover minestrone or vegetable soup from the previous day. There are many variations, but ingredients often include leftover bread, cannellini beans, and inexpensive vegetables such as carrot, cabbage, beans, silverbeet, cavolo nero, onion, and olive oil.

Another of the cuisine's simple staples is the lampredotto, made from tripe. The classic preparation of the sandwich requires boiling the tripe with carrots, celery, tomato, and salt. Then, it is served with a sauce of parsley, garlic, capers, and oil. The sandwich is held together with michetta bread.

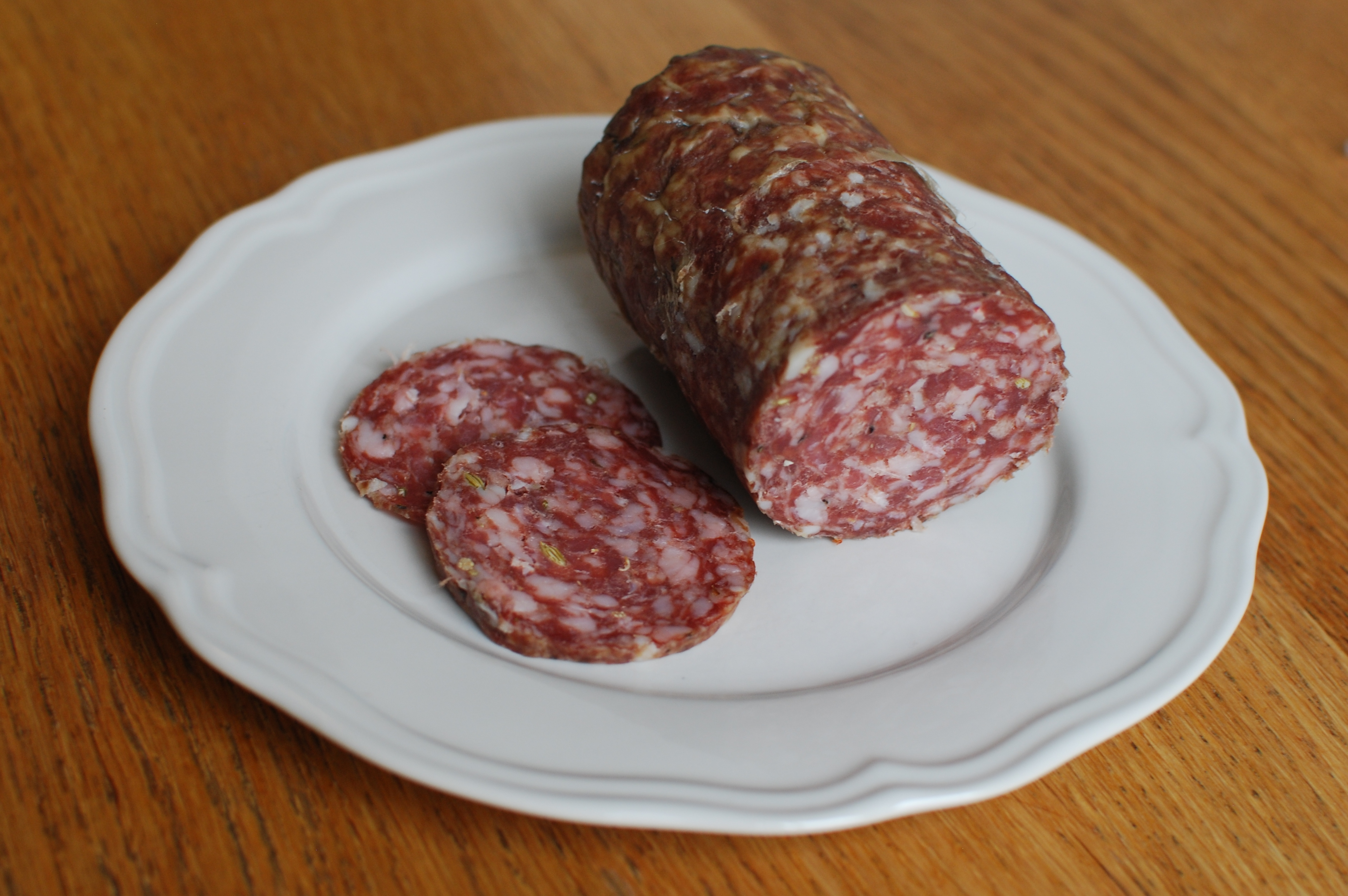
Finocchiona, a classic Tuscan salami

Tuscany has a few key pastas originating from the region or used frequently in local cooking. These include tortelli, gnudi, pappardelle, orecchiette, and pici.

High-quality ingredients, specific to the region, are essential to Tuscan cooking. The region has 32 PDO and PGI quality agrifood products. These ingredients are showcased in the English chef Normal Russell's 2023 cookbook, Brutto. These include white truffles from San Miniato which begin to appear and are harvested in September and December, as well as other truffle varieties, including the Marzuolo truffle, known as Bianchetto, the prized summer black truffle.

Pork is also wildly produced in the region. The region is well-known also for its rich game meat, especially wild boar, hare, fallow deer, roe deer, and pheasant that often are used to prepare pappardelle dishes. Maiale ubriaco (lit. 'drunken pork') is another regional preparation in which pork is braised in Chianti wine and often paired with Tuscan kale. Lardo is a salume of cured fatback, served as thin slices or as a paste; a famous variety is lardo di Colonnata.

Regional desserts include cantucci (oblong-shaped almond biscuits), castagnaccio (a chestnut flour cake), pan di ramerino (a sweet bread containing raisins and rosemary), panforte (prepared with honey, fruits, and nuts), ricciarelli (biscuits made using an almond base with sugar, honey, and egg white), necci (galettes made with chestnut flour), and cavallucci (pastry made with almonds, candied fruits, coriander, flour, and honey).

Well-known regional wines include Brunello di Montalcino, Carmignano, Chianti, Morellino di Scansano, Parrina, Sassicaia, and Vernaccia di San Gimignano.

=== Umbria ===
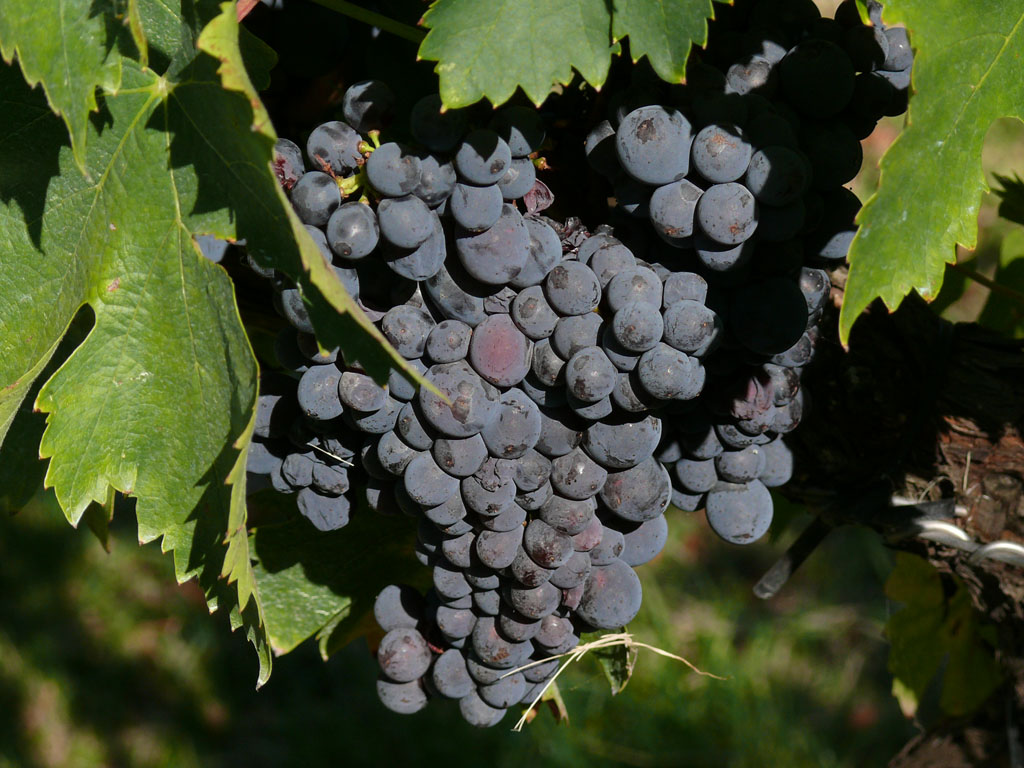
A varietal Sagrantino indigenous to the region of Umbria

Many Umbrian dishes are prepared by boiling or roasting with local olive oil and herbs. Vegetable dishes are popular in the spring and summer, while fall and winter sees meat from hunting and black truffles from Norcia. Meat dishes include the traditional wild boar sausages, pheasants, geese, pigeons, frogs, and snails.

Castelluccio is known for its lentils. Spoleto and Monteleone are known for spelt. Freshwater fish include lasca, trout, freshwater perch, grayling, eel, barbel, whitefish, and tench. Orvieto and Sagrantino di Montefalco are important regional wines.

=== Veneto ===
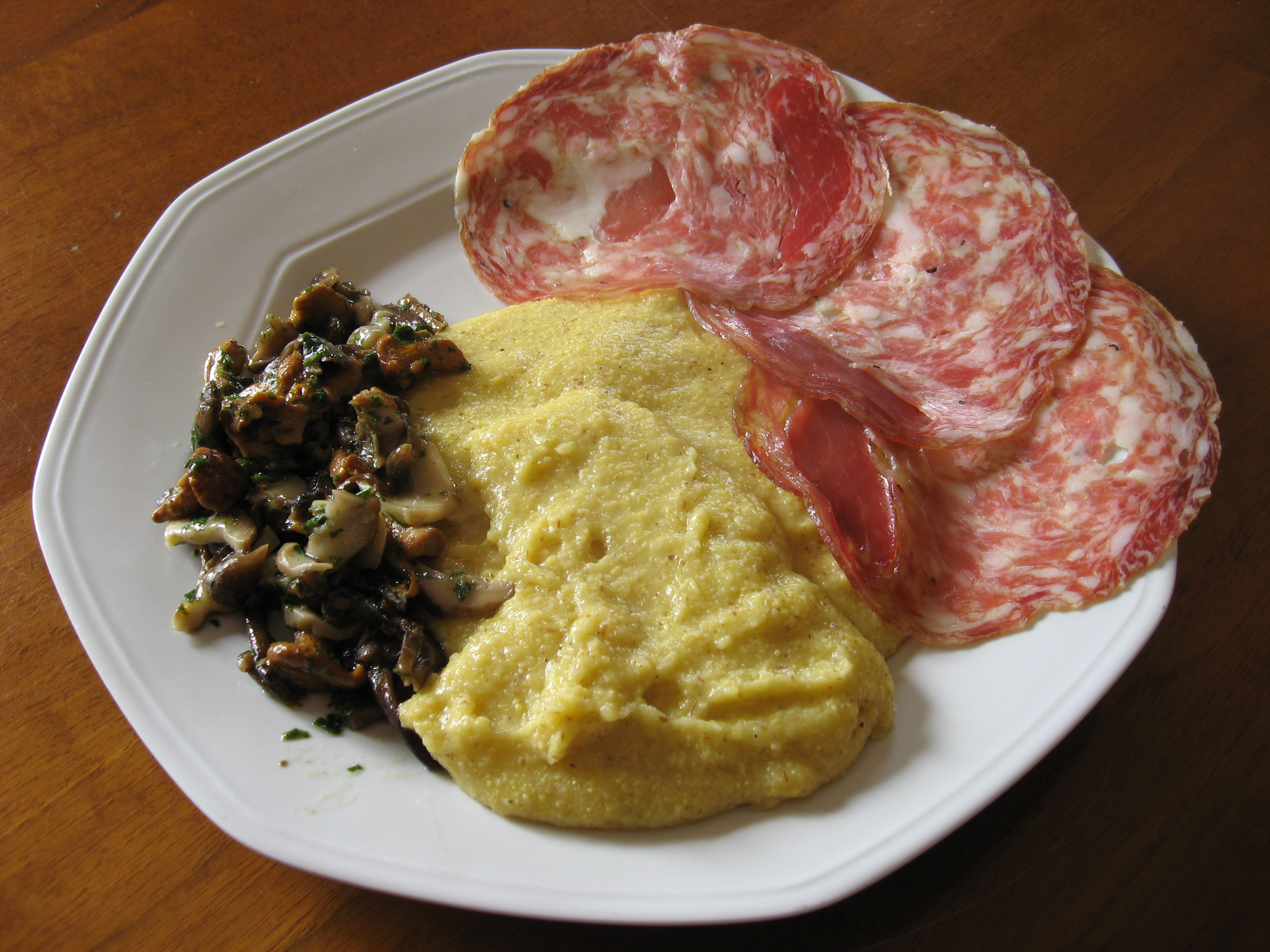
Polenta served with sopressa and mushrooms, a traditional peasant food of Veneto

Venetian cuisine may be divided into three main categories, based on geography: the coastal areas, the plains, and the mountains. Each one (especially the plains) can have many local cuisines, each city with its own dishes.

Venice and many surrounding parts of Veneto are known for risotto, a dish whose ingredients can highly vary upon different areas. Fish and seafood are added in regions closer to the coast while pumpkin, asparagus, radicchio, and frog legs appear farther away from the Adriatic Sea.

Made from finely ground maize meal, polenta is a traditional, rural food typical of Veneto and most of northern Italy. It may be included in stirred dishes and baked dishes. Polenta can be served with various cheese, stockfish or meat dishes. Some polenta dishes include porcini, rapini, or other vegetables or meats, such as small songbirds in the case of the Venetian and Lombard dish polenta e osei, or sausages. In some areas of Veneto it can be also made of a particular variety of cornmeal, named biancoperla, so that the colour of polenta is white and not yellow (the so-called polenta bianca).

Beans, peas, and other legumes are seen in these areas with pasta e fagioli (lit. 'beans and pasta') and risi e bisi (lit. 'rice and peas'). Venice features heavy dishes using exotic spices and sauces. Ingredients such as stockfish or simple marinated anchovies are found here as well.

Less fish and more meat is eaten away from the coast. Other typical products are sausages such as sopressa, garlic salami, Piave cheese, and Asiago cheese. High-quality vegetables are prized, such as red radicchio from Treviso and white asparagus from Bassano del Grappa. Perhaps the most popular dish of Venice is fegato alla veneziana, thinly sliced veal liver sautéed with onions.

Squid and cuttlefish are common ingredients, as is squid ink, called nero di seppia. Among the regional desserts there is the famous tiramisu, baicoli (biscuits made with butter and vanilla), and nougat.

The most celebrated Venetian wines include Bardolino, Prosecco, Soave, Amarone, and Valpolicella DOC wines.

== Meal structure ==
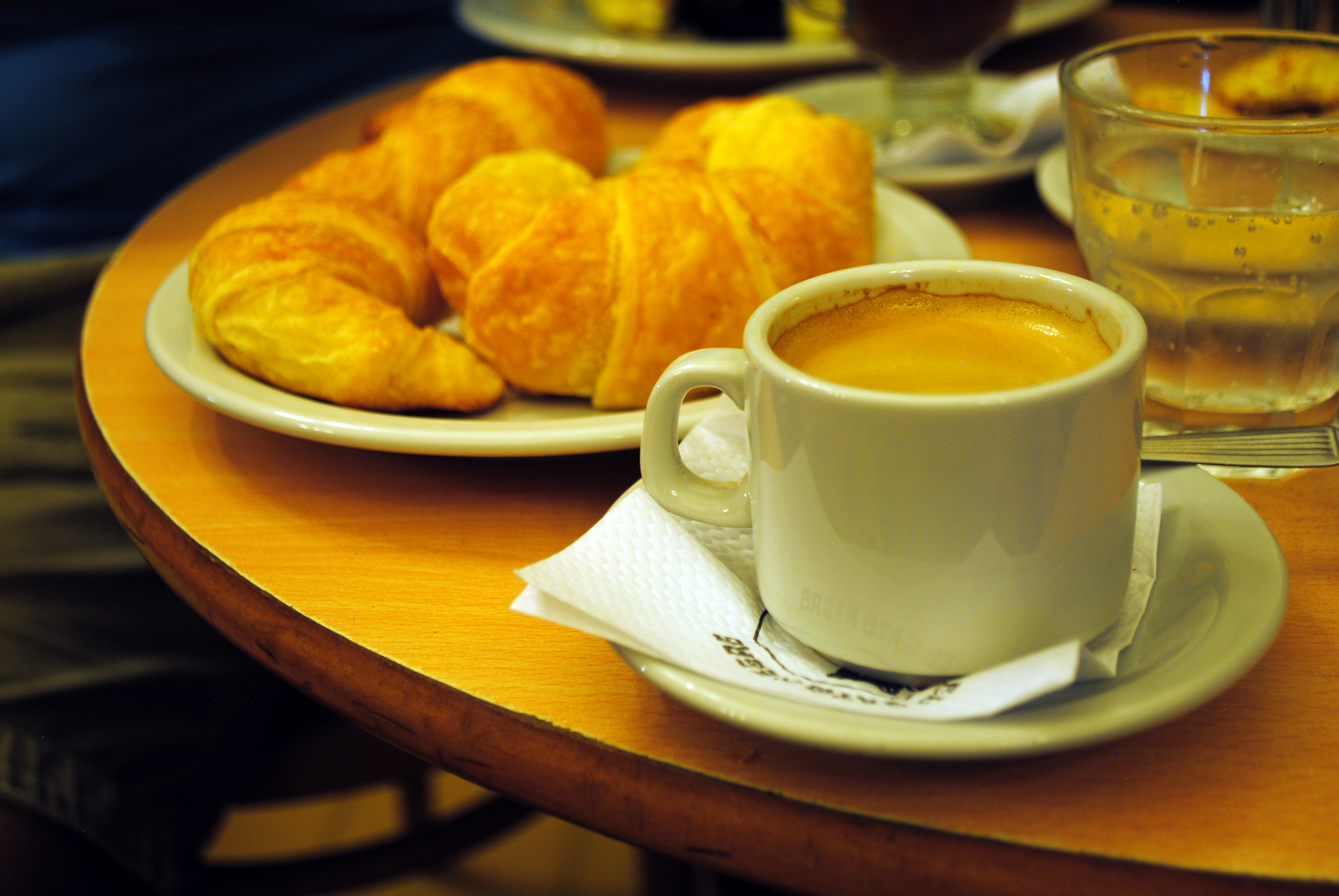
A typical Italian breakfast (Italian: colazione), consisting of cappuccino and cornetto

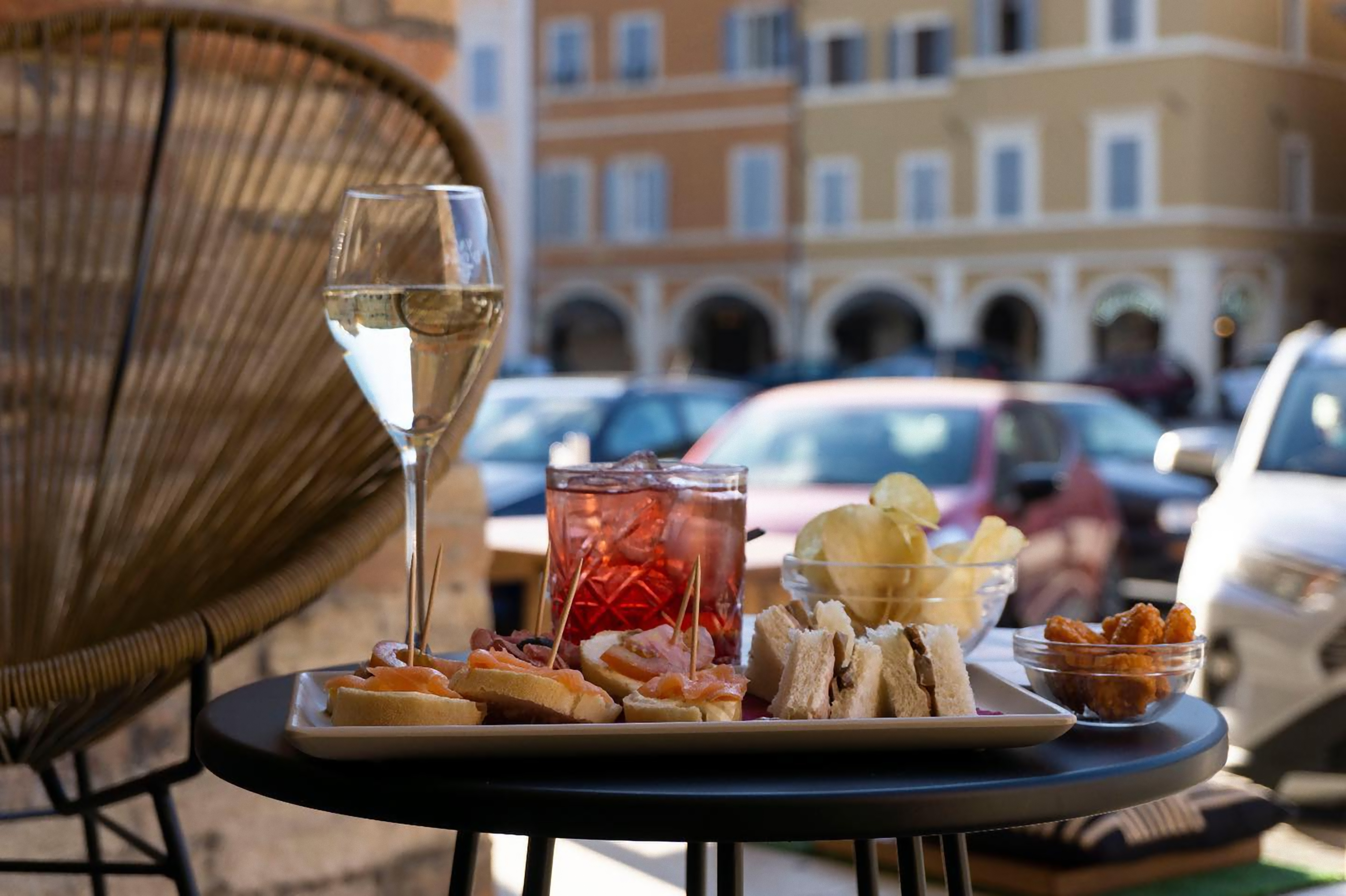
A classic Italian aperitivo

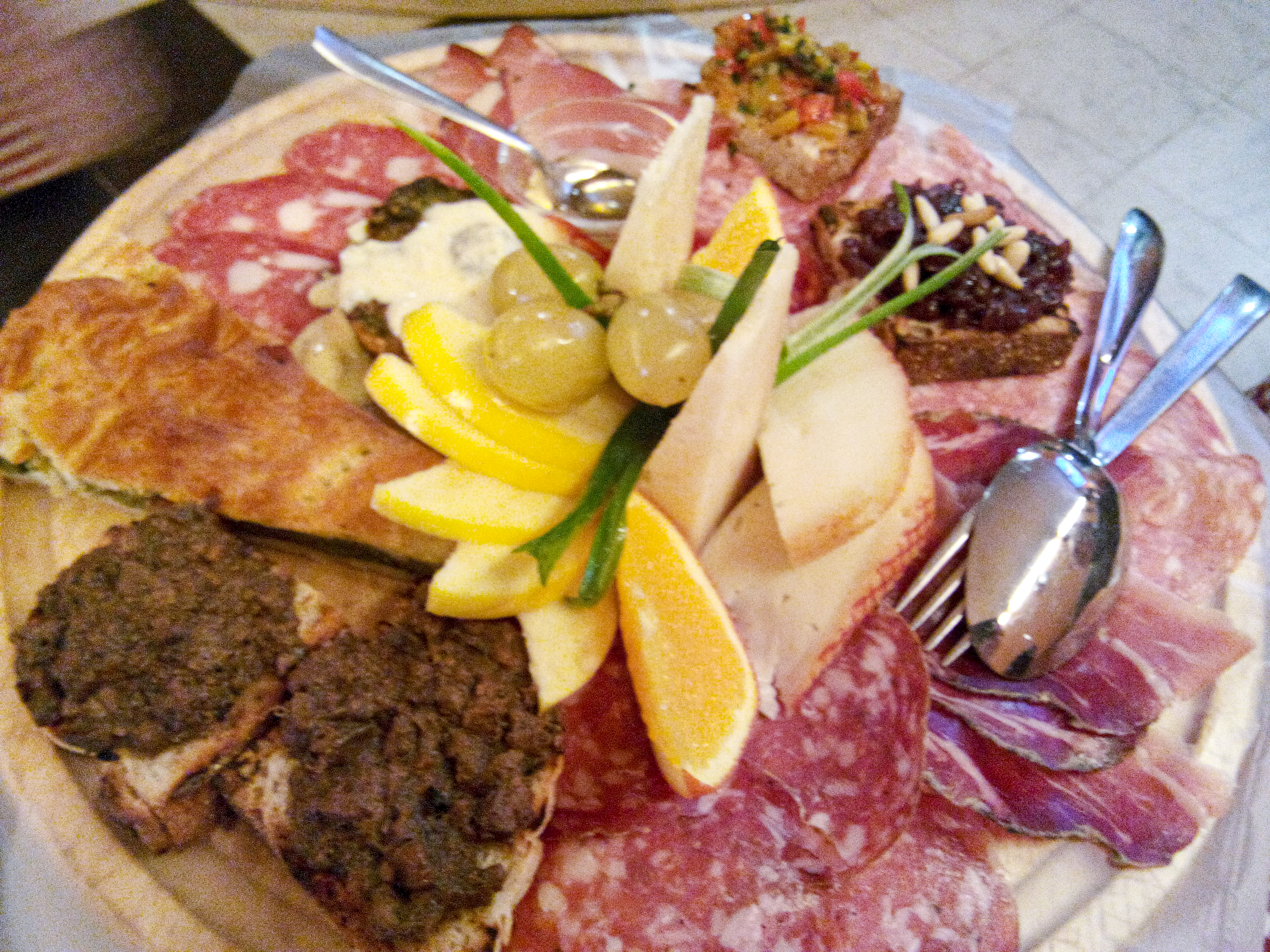
An Italian-style antipasto

Italian meal structure is typical of the European Mediterranean region and differs from North, Central, and Eastern European meal structure, although it still often consists of breakfast (Italian: colazione), lunch (Italian: pranzo), and supper (Italian: cena). However, much less emphasis is placed on breakfast, and breakfast itself is often skipped or involves lighter meal portions than are seen in non-Mediterranean Western countries. Late-morning and mid-afternoon snacks, called merenda, are also often included in this meal structure.

Traditional meals in Italy typically contained four or five courses. Especially on weekends, meals are often seen as a time to spend with family and friends rather than simply for sustenance; thus, meals tend to be longer than in other cultures. According to a dataset of OECD countries, Italians ranked third highest among countries surveyed on time spent eating and drinking, averaging 114 minutes per day. During holidays such as Christmas and New Year's Eve, feasts can last for hours.

Today, full-course meals are mainly reserved for special events such as weddings, while everyday meals include only a first or second course (sometimes both), a side dish, and coffee. The primo (first course) is usually a filling dish, such as risotto or pasta, with sauces made from meat, vegetables or seafood. Whole pieces of meat such as sausages, meatballs, and poultry are eaten in the secondo (second course). Italian cuisine has some single-course meals (Italian: piatto unico) combining starches and proteins. Most regions in Italy serve bread at the table, placing it in either a basket or directly on the table to be eaten alongside both the first and second courses. Bread is consumed alongside the other food, and is often used at the end of the meal to wipe the remaining sauce or broth from the dish. The expression fare la scarpetta is used to encourage a diner to use the bread to absorb the remaining food on the plate.

Meal stage	Description
Aperitivo	Apéritif usually enjoyed as an appetiser before a large meal; they may be Campari, Martini, Cinzano, Prosecco, Aperol, Spritz, Vermouth, Negroni, etc.
Antipasto	lit. 'before (the) meal', hot or cold, usually consists of cheese, prosciutto, sliced sausage, marinated vegetables or fish, bruschetta, and bread appetisers.
Primo	"First course", usually consists of a hot dish such as pasta (most frequently), risotto, gnocchi or soup with a sauce, vegetarian, meat or fish sugo or ragù as a sauce. The primo is the most frequent course, with the others often seen as somewhat optional. This course is the main source of carbohydrates of the meal.
Secondo	"Second course", the main dish, usually fish or meat with potatoes. Traditionally, veal, pork, and chicken are most commonly used, at least in the north, although beef has become more popular since World War II, and wild game meat is also found, particularly in Tuscany. Fish is also very popular, especially in the south.
Contorno	"Side dish". It may be a salad or cooked vegetables. A traditional menu features salad along with the main course.
Formaggio e frutta	"Cheese and fruits", the first dessert. Local cheeses may be part of the antipasto or contorno as well. Cheese is often eaten the last before fruit, after secondo or contorno.
Dolce	"Sweet", such as cakes (e.g. tiramisu), biscuits or ice cream.
Caffè	lit. 'coffee'.
Digestivo	"Digestives", liquors, and liqueurs (grappa, amaro, limoncello, sambuca, nocino, etc., sometimes referred to as ammazzacaffè, 'coffee-killer', since they would "kill" or "remove" the taste of coffee).

== Food establishments ==
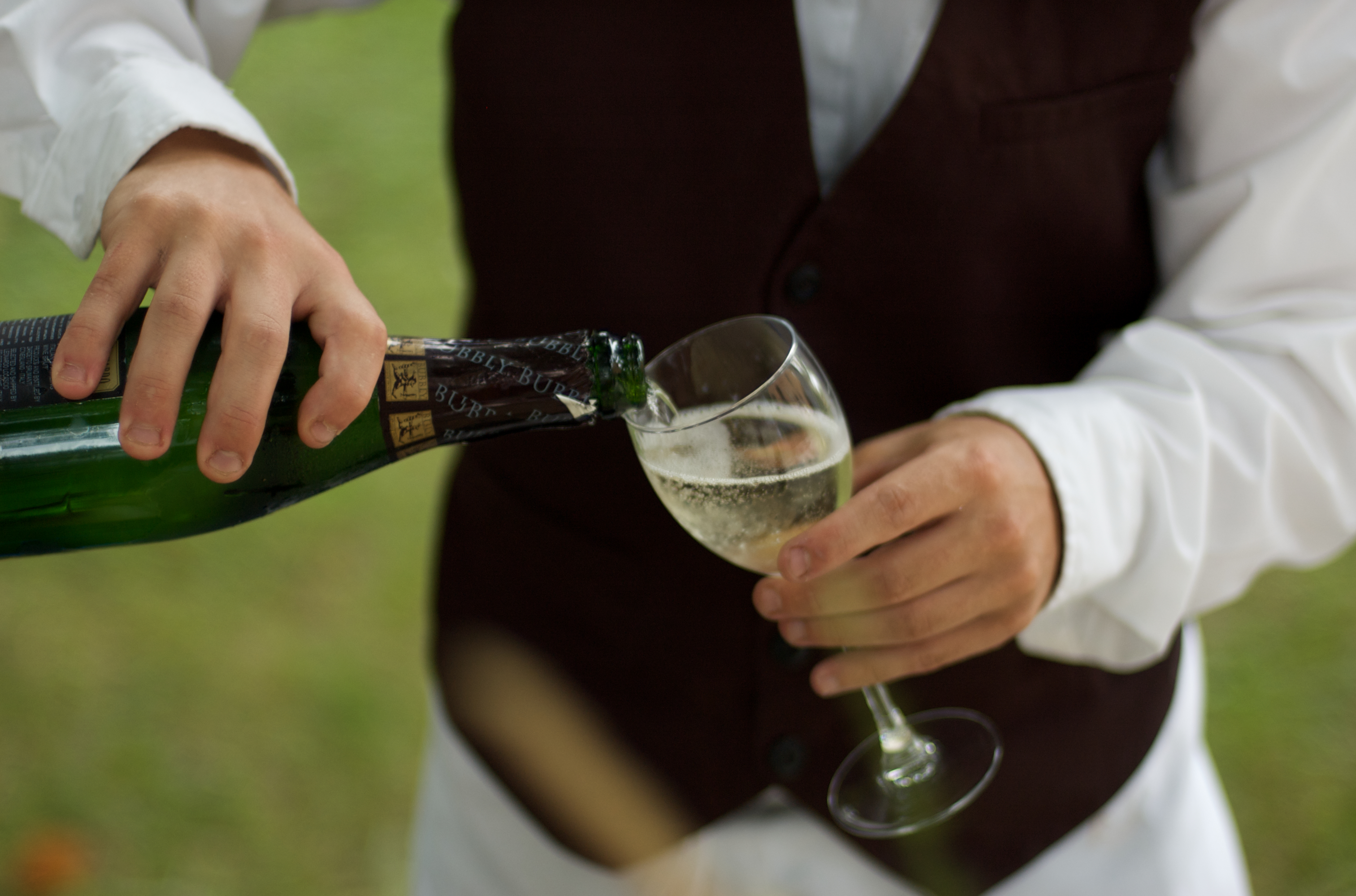
Waiter pouring Prosecco

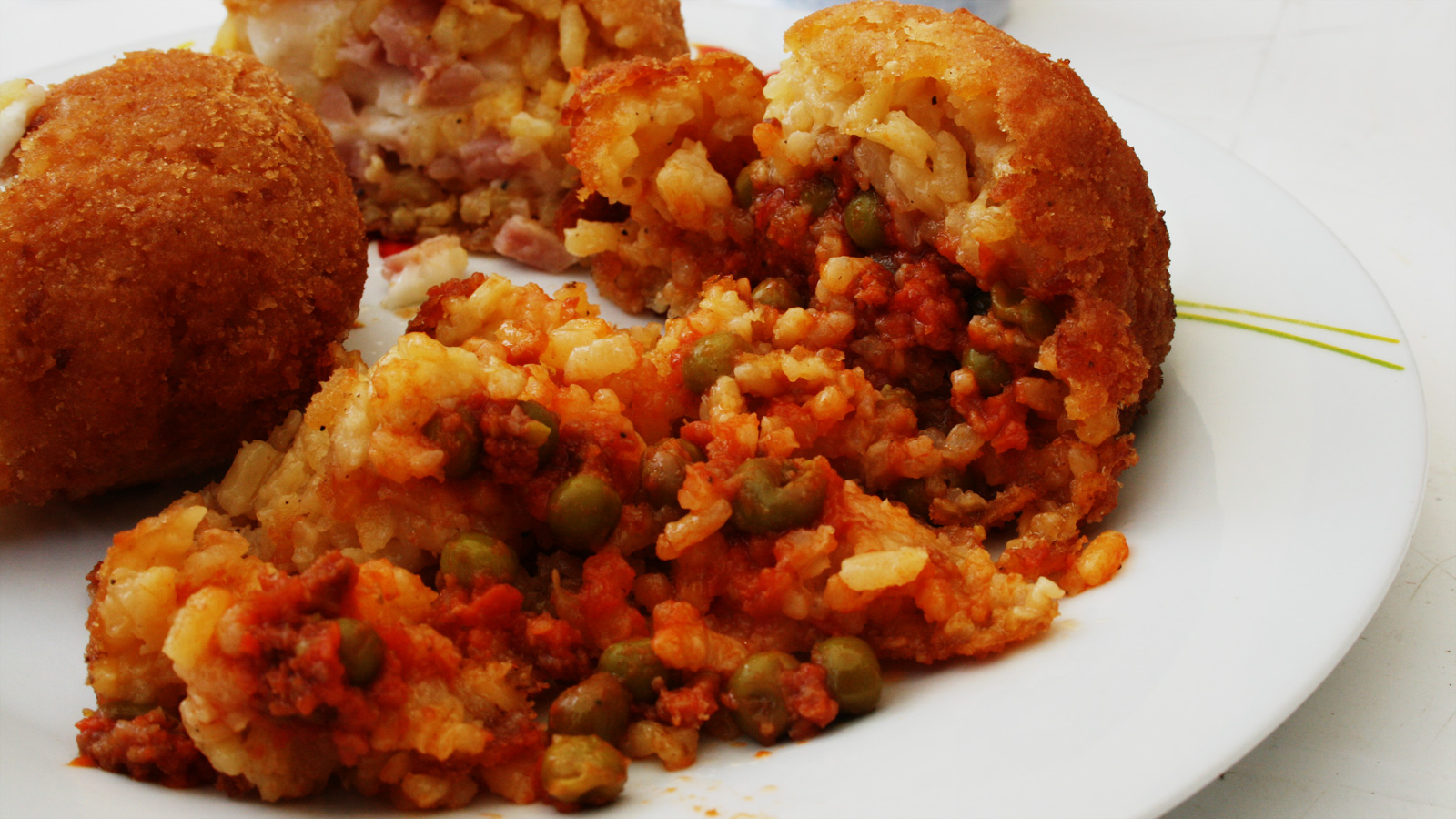
Arancini

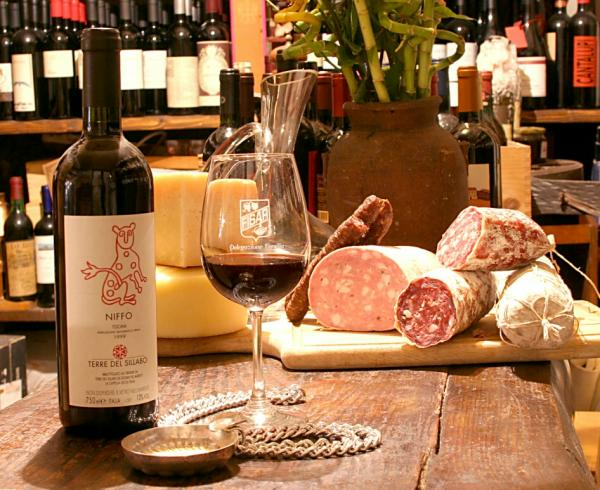
Italian wine and salumi

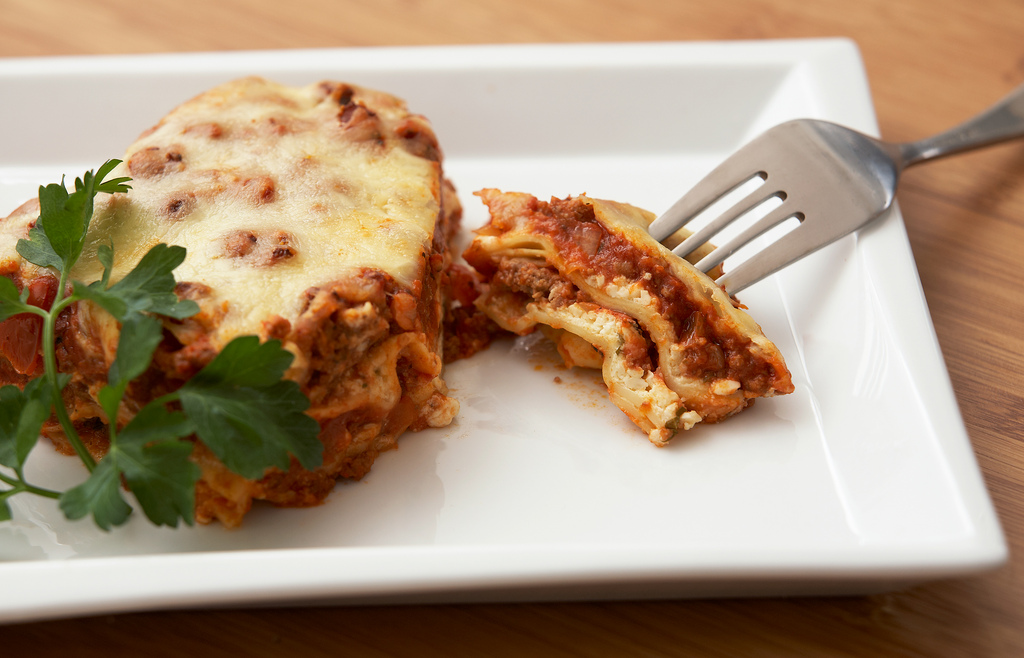
Baked lasagna with ragù

Each type of establishment has a defined role and traditionally sticks to it. Italy is home to 395 Michelin star-rated restaurants.

Establishment	Description
Agriturismo	Working farms that offer accommodations and meals. Sometimes meals are served to guests only. According to Italian law, they can only serve locally made products (except drinks). Marked by a green and gold sign with a knife and fork.
Bar/caffè	Locations which serve coffee, soft drinks, juice, and alcohol. Hours are generally from 6 am to 10 pm. Foods may include cornetti and other sweet breads (often called brioche in northern Italy), panini, tramezzini (sandwiches), and spuntini (snacks such as olives and potato crisps).
Caffetteria	Locations where coffee and similar drinks are consumed, and desserts can also be eaten.
Birreria	A bar that offers beer; found in central and northern regions of Italy.
Bruschetteria	Specialises in bruschetta, although other dishes may also be offered.
Enoteca	Place where wines are sold or offered for tasting, displayed to the public on the basis of criteria that facilitate their choice.
Fiaschetteria	Locations which serve wine in fiaschi and bottles, although other dishes may also be offered.
Formaggeria	A shop serving cheese.
Frasca	Friulian wine producers that open for the evening and may offer food along with their wines.
Gelateria	A shop where the customer can get gelato to go, or sit down and eat it in a cup or a cone. Bigger ice desserts, coffee or liquors may also be ordered.
Locanda	Locations where it is possible to consume food and where one can be accommodated.
Osteria	Focused on simple food of the region, often having no written menu. Many are open only at night, but some are open for lunch. The name has become fashionable for upscale restaurants with a rustic regional style.
Panificio or panetteria	A shop serving flour-based food baked in an oven such as bread, biscuits, cakes, pastries, and pies.
Paninoteca or panineria	Sandwich shop open during the day.
Pasticceria	A shop serving a variety of pastries, confectioneries, biscuits, and cakes.
Pastificio	A shop serving artisanal pasta.
Piadineria	Specialises in piadina, although other dishes may also be offered.
Pizzeria	Specialises in pizza, often with wood-fired ovens.
Polenteria	Serving polenta; uncommon, and found only in northern regions.
Ristorante	Often offers upscale cuisine and printed menus.
Rosticceria	Fast food restaurant, offering local dishes such as cotoletta alla milanese, roasted meat (usually pork or chicken), supplì, and arancini even as take-away.
Sagra	Popular festival, which takes place in a town or in a district to celebrate an event, or an agro-food product, where it is possible to consume food.
Salumeria	A shop serving salumi and cheeses.
Spaghetteria	Originating in Naples, offering pasta dishes and other main courses.
Tavola calda	lit. 'hot table', offers pre-made regional dishes. Most open at 11 am and close late.
Trattoria	A dining establishment, often family-run, with inexpensive prices and an informal atmosphere.

Food establishments

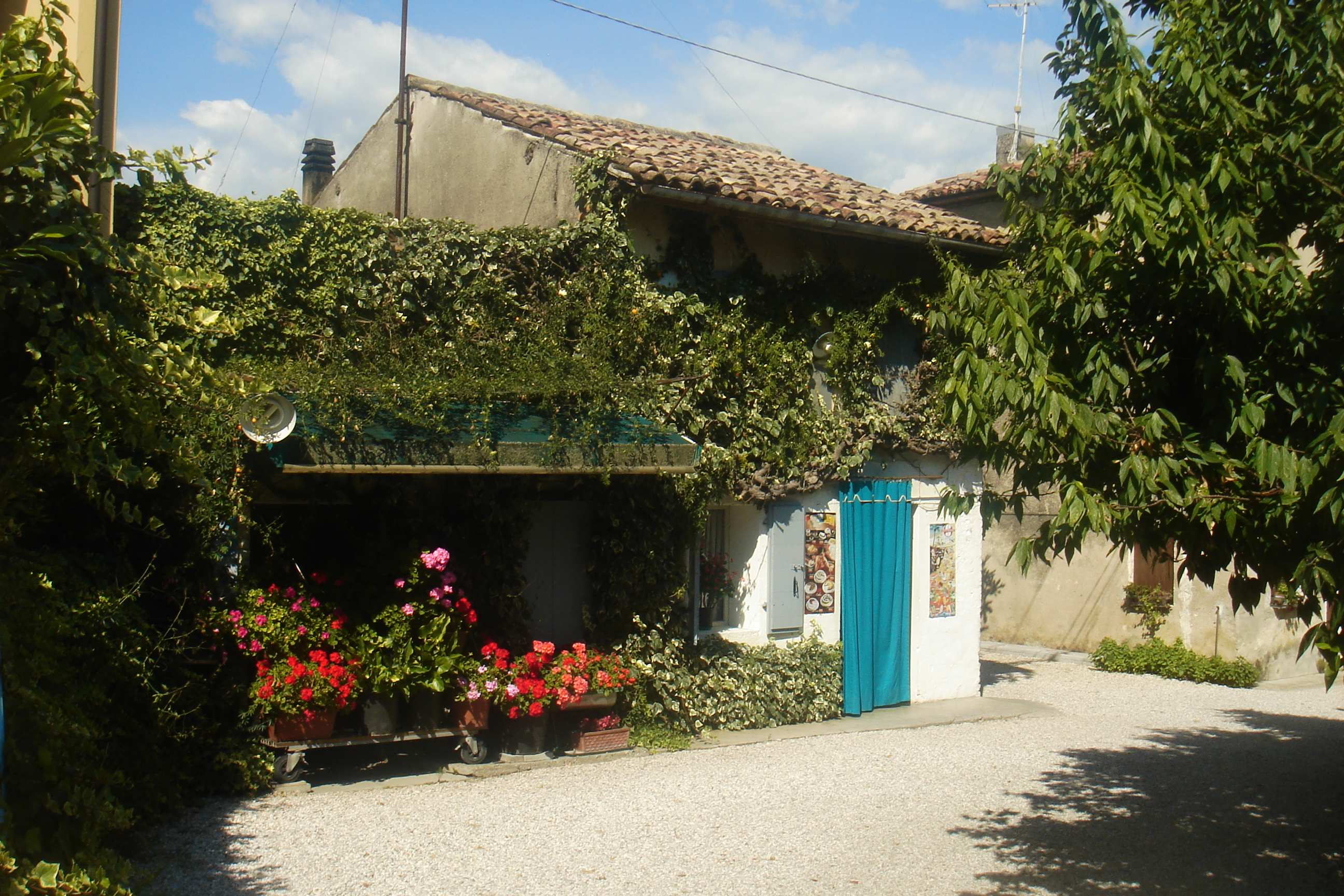
The garden at an osteria in Castello Roganzuolo, Veneto, Italy

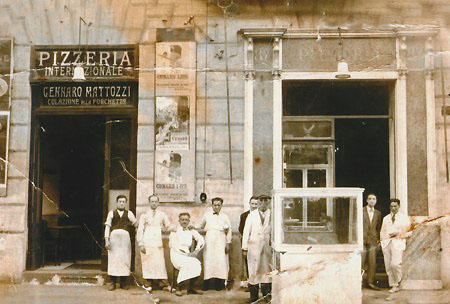
A pizzeria in Naples, Italy, c. 1910

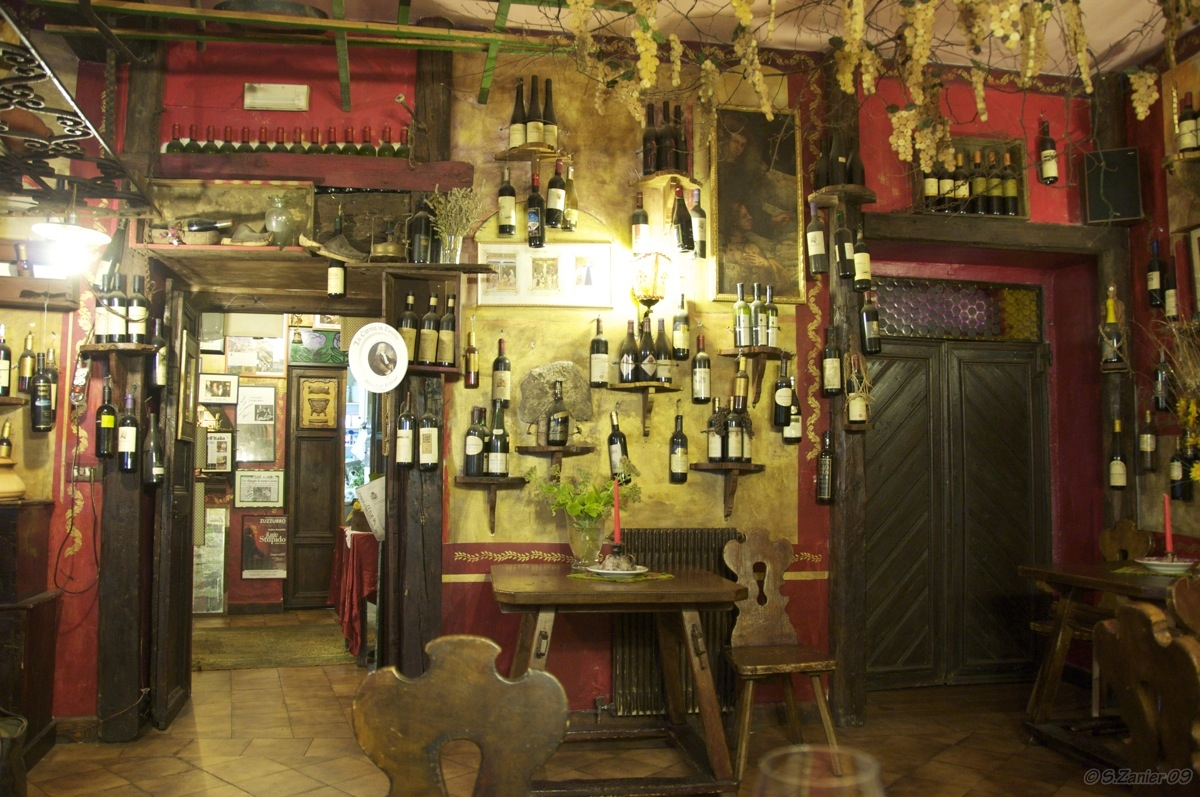
Interior of a trattoria in Tolmezzo, Friuli, Italy

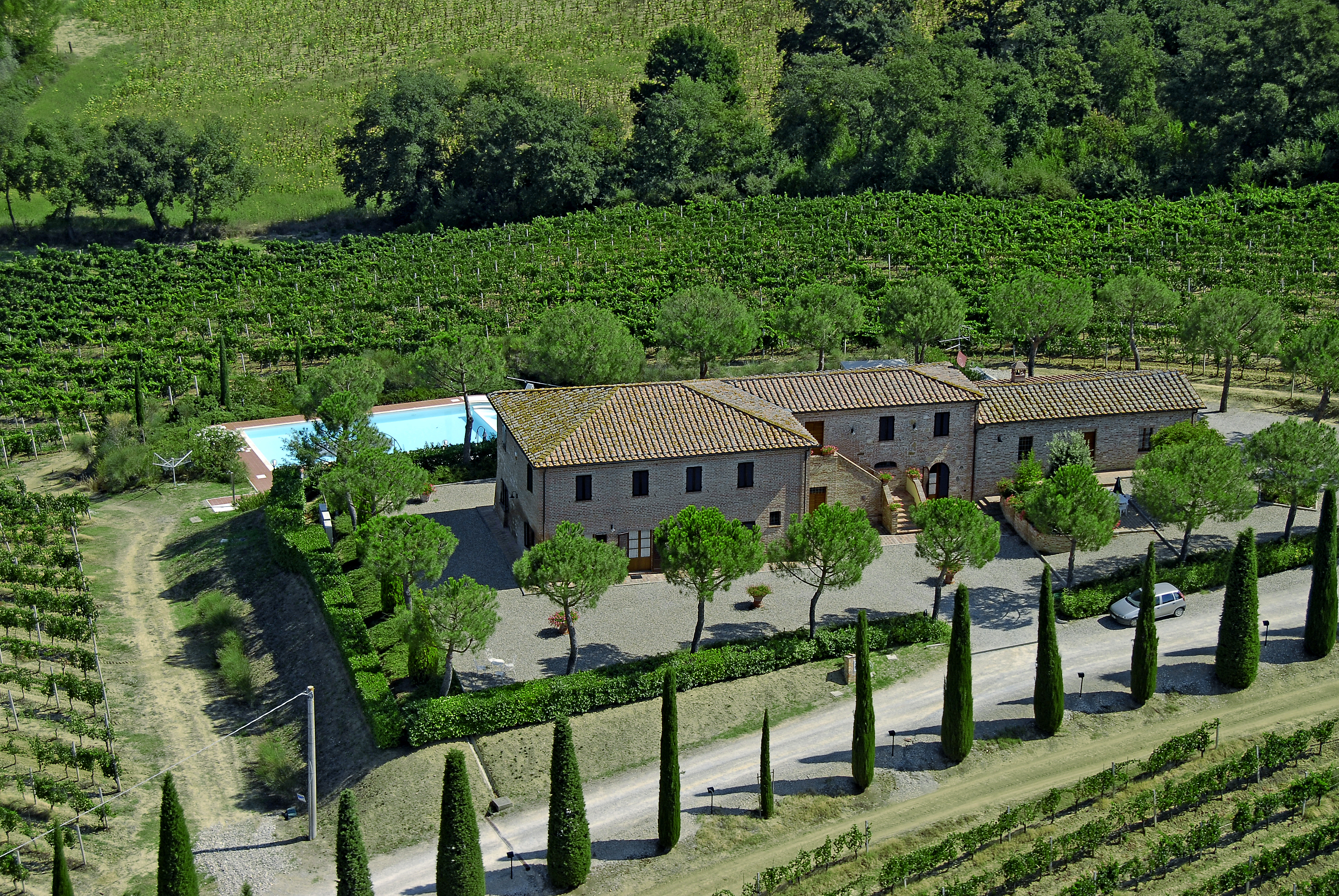
An agriturismo in Montepulciano, Tuscany, Italy

== Drinks ==
=== Coffee ===
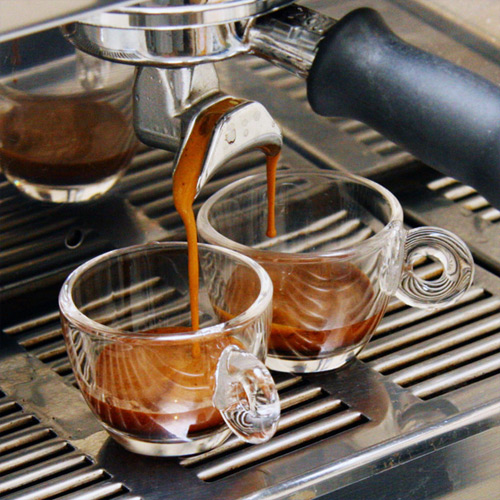
Espresso is a coffee brewed by forcing a small amount of nearly boiling water under pressure through finely ground coffee beans. The term espresso comes from the Italian esprimere, which means 'to express', and refers to the process by which hot water is forced under pressure through ground coffee.

Italian style coffee (Italian: caffè), also known as espresso, is made from a blend of coffee beans. Espresso beans are roasted medium to medium dark in the north, and darker as one moves south.

A common misconception is that espresso has more caffeine than other coffee; in fact, the opposite is true. The longer roasting period extracts more caffeine. The modern espresso machine, invented in 1937 by Achille Gaggia, uses a pump and pressure system with water heated to 90 to 95 °C (194 to 203 °F) and forced at high pressure through a few grams of finely ground coffee in 25–30 seconds, resulting in about 25 millilitres (0.85 fl oz, two tablespoons) of liquid.

Home coffee makers are simpler but work under the same principle. La napoletana is a four-part stove-top unit with grounds loosely placed inside a filter; the kettle portion is filled with water and once boiling, the unit is inverted to drip through the grounds. The moka per il caffè is a three-part stove-top unit that is placed on the stovetop with loosely packed grounds in a strainer; the water rises from steam pressure and is forced through the grounds into the top portion. In both cases, the water passes through the grounds just once.

Espresso is usually served in a demitasse cup. Caffè macchiato is topped with a bit of steamed milk or foam; ristretto is made with less water, and is stronger; cappuccino is mixed or topped with steamed, mostly frothy, milk. It is generally considered a morning beverage, and usually is not taken after a meal; caffè latte is equal parts espresso and steamed milk, similar to café au lait, and is typically served in a large cup. Latte macchiato (spotted milk) is a glass of warm milk with a bit of coffee and caffè corretto is "corrected" with a few drops of an alcoholic beverage such as grappa or brandy.

The bicerin is also an Italian coffee from Turin. It is a mixture of cappuccino and traditional hot chocolate, as it consists of a mix of coffee and drinking chocolate, and with a small addition of milk. It is quite thick and often whipped cream/foam with chocolate powder and sugar is added on top.

=== Alcoholic beverages ===
==== Wine ====
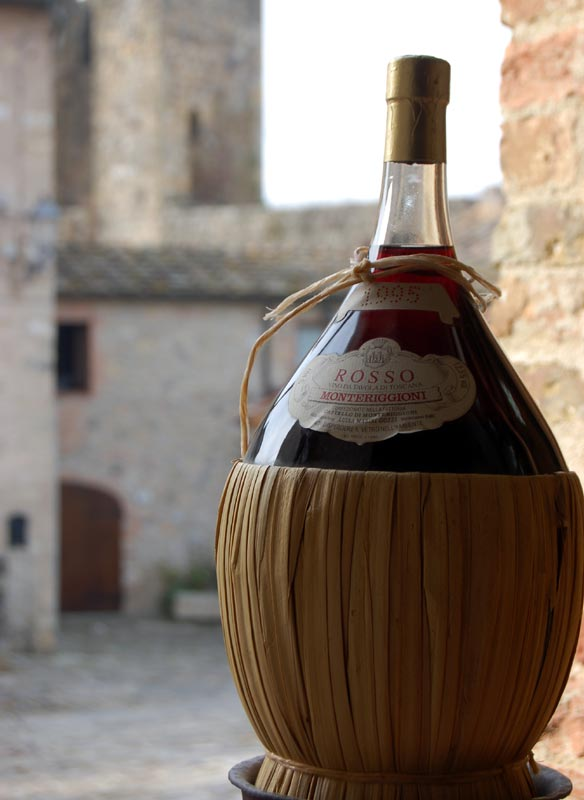
Tuscan Chianti in a traditional fiasco

Italy is the world's largest producer of wine, as well as the country with the widest variety of indigenous grapevine varieties in the world. In 1996 only about a quarter of this wine was put into bottles for individual sale. Two-thirds was bulk wine used for blending in France and Germany. The wine distilled into spirits in Italy exceeded the production of wine in the entirety of the New World. There are twenty separate wine regions. The Italian wine industry is among the most varied in the world due to hundreds of indigenous grape varieties grown throughout Italy. Some of the most iconic red wines include Barolo, Barbaresco, Brunello di Montalcino, and Amarone.

The Italian government passed the denominazione di origine controllata (DOC) law in 1963 to regulate place of origin, quality, production method, and type of grape. The designation indicazione geografica tipica (IGT) is a less restrictive designation to help a wine maker graduate to the DOC level. In 1980, the government created the denominazione di origine controllata e garantita (DOCG), reserved for only the best wines.

In Italy water and wine are commonly consumed in meals. It is extremely uncommon for meals to be served with any other drink, alcoholic, or otherwise.

==== Beer ====
Italy is considered to be part of the wine belt of Europe. Nevertheless, beer, particularly mass-produced pale lagers, are common in the country. It is traditionally considered to be an ideal accompaniment to pizza; since the 1970s, beer has spread from pizzerias and has become much more popular for drinking in other situations. Among many popular brands, the most notable Italian breweries are Peroni and Moretti.

==== Other ====
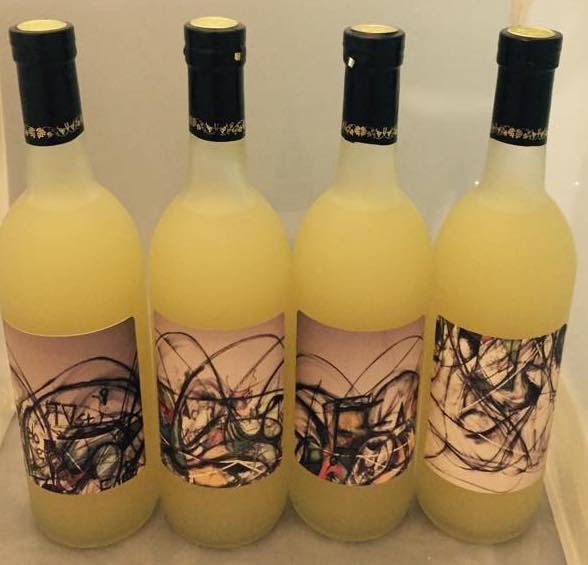
Bottles of limoncello

There are also several other popular alcoholic drinks in Italy. Limoncello, a traditional lemon liqueur from Campania (Sorrento, Amalfi, and the Gulf of Naples) is the second most popular liqueur in Italy after Campari. Made from lemon, it is usually consumed in very small proportions, served chilled in small glasses or cups.

Amaro Averna is a common Sicilian digestif, made with herbs, which is usually drunk after heavy meals. Mirto, an herbal distillate made from the berries (red mirto) and leaves (white mirto) of the myrtle bush, is popular in Sardinia and other regions. Another well-known digestif is Amaro Lucano from Basilicata.

Grappa is the typical alcoholic drink of northern Italy, generally associated with the culture of the Alps and of the Po Valley. The most famous grappas are distilled in Friuli-Venezia Giulia, Veneto, Piedmont, and Trentino. The three most notable and recognisable Italian apéritifs are Martini, Vermouth, and Campari. A sparkling drink which is becoming internationally popular as a less expensive substitute for French champagne is Prosecco, from the Veneto region.

== Desserts ==
From the Italian perspective, biscuits and candy belong to the same category of sweets. Traditional candies include candied fruits, torrone, and nut brittles, all of which are still popular in the modern era. In medieval times, northern Italy became so famous for the quality of its stiff fruit pastes (similar to marmalade or conserves, except stiff enough to mold into shapes) that "Paste of Genoa" became a generic name for high-quality fruit conserves. Italy is famous for artisanal gelato (the Italian ice cream) and has become widespread with the ice cream cone, covering 55% of the Italian market.

Silver-coated almond dragées, which are called confetti in Italian, are thrown at weddings (white coating) and baptisms (blue or pink coating, according to the sex of the newborn baby), or graduations (red coating), often wrapped in a small tulle bag as a gift to the guests. The idea of including a romantic note with candy may have begun with Italian dragées, no later than the early 19th century, and is carried on with the multilingual love notes included in boxes of Italy's most famous chocolate, Baci by Perugina in Milan. The most significant chocolate style is a combination of hazelnuts and milk chocolate, which is featured in gianduja pastes such as Nutella, which is made by Ferrero SpA in Alba, Piedmont, as well as Perugnia's Baci and many other chocolate confections.

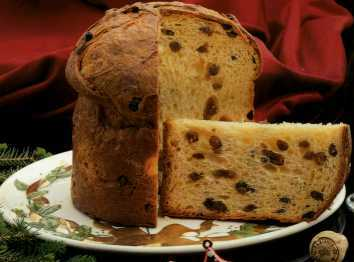
Panettone is a traditional Christmas cake.

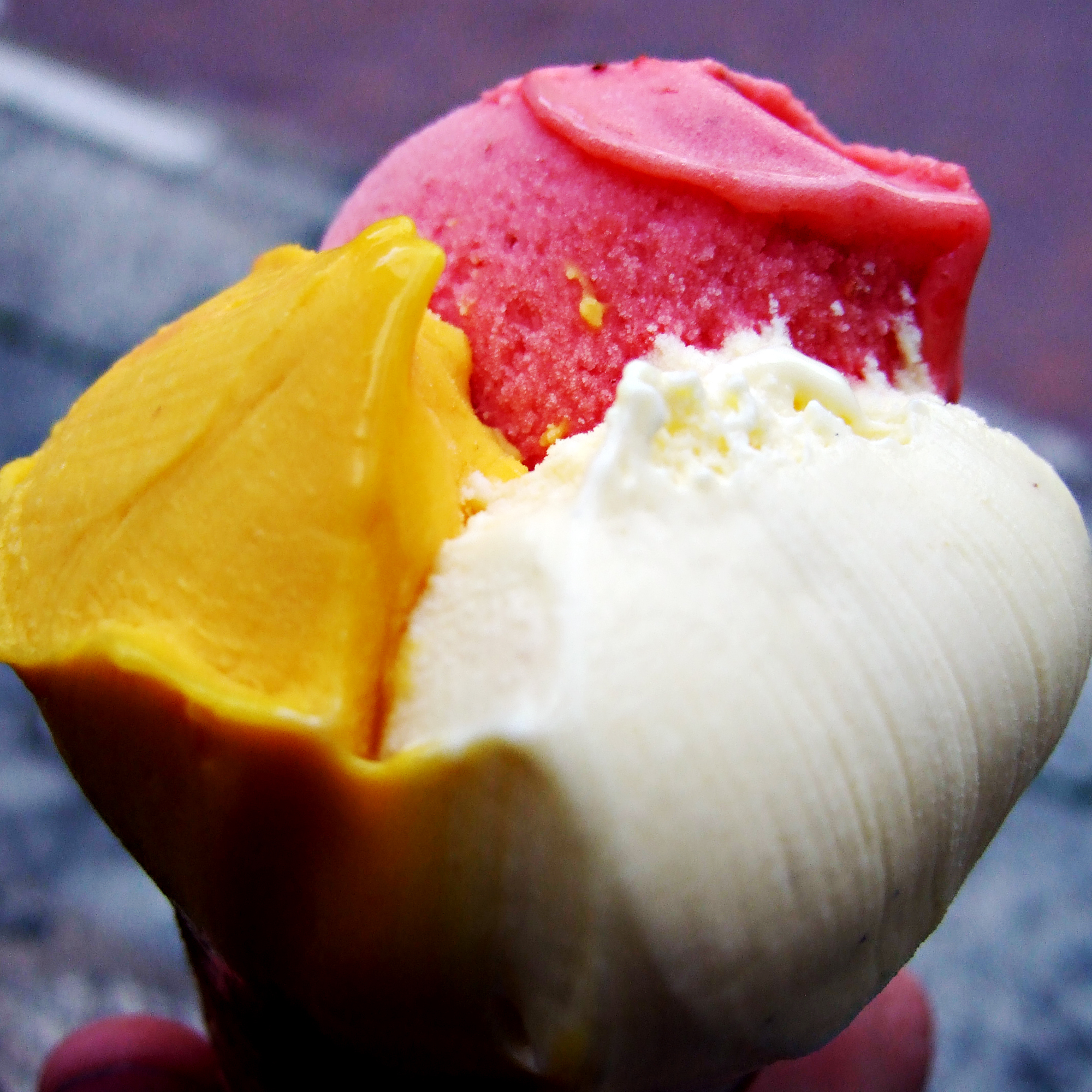
Gelato is Italian ice cream.

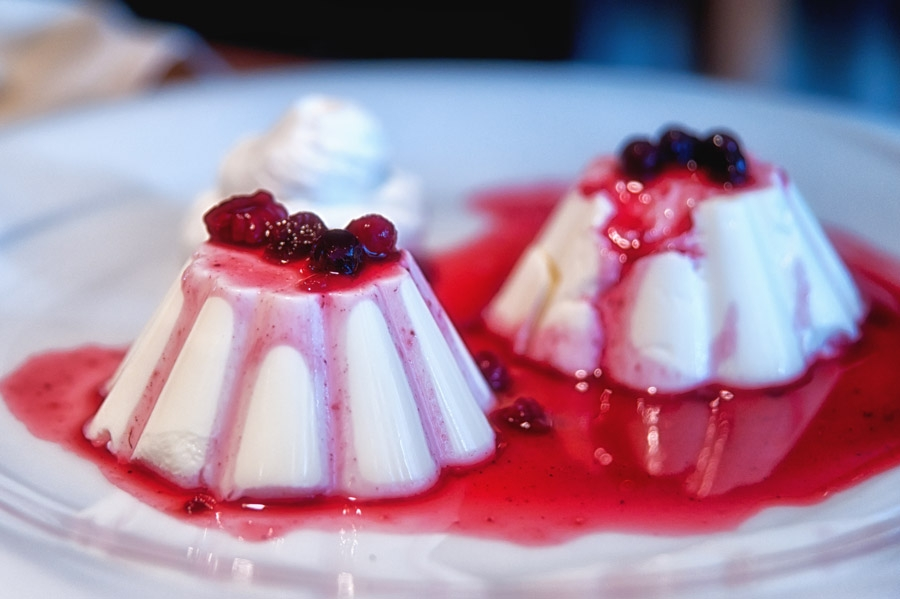
Panna cotta with garnish

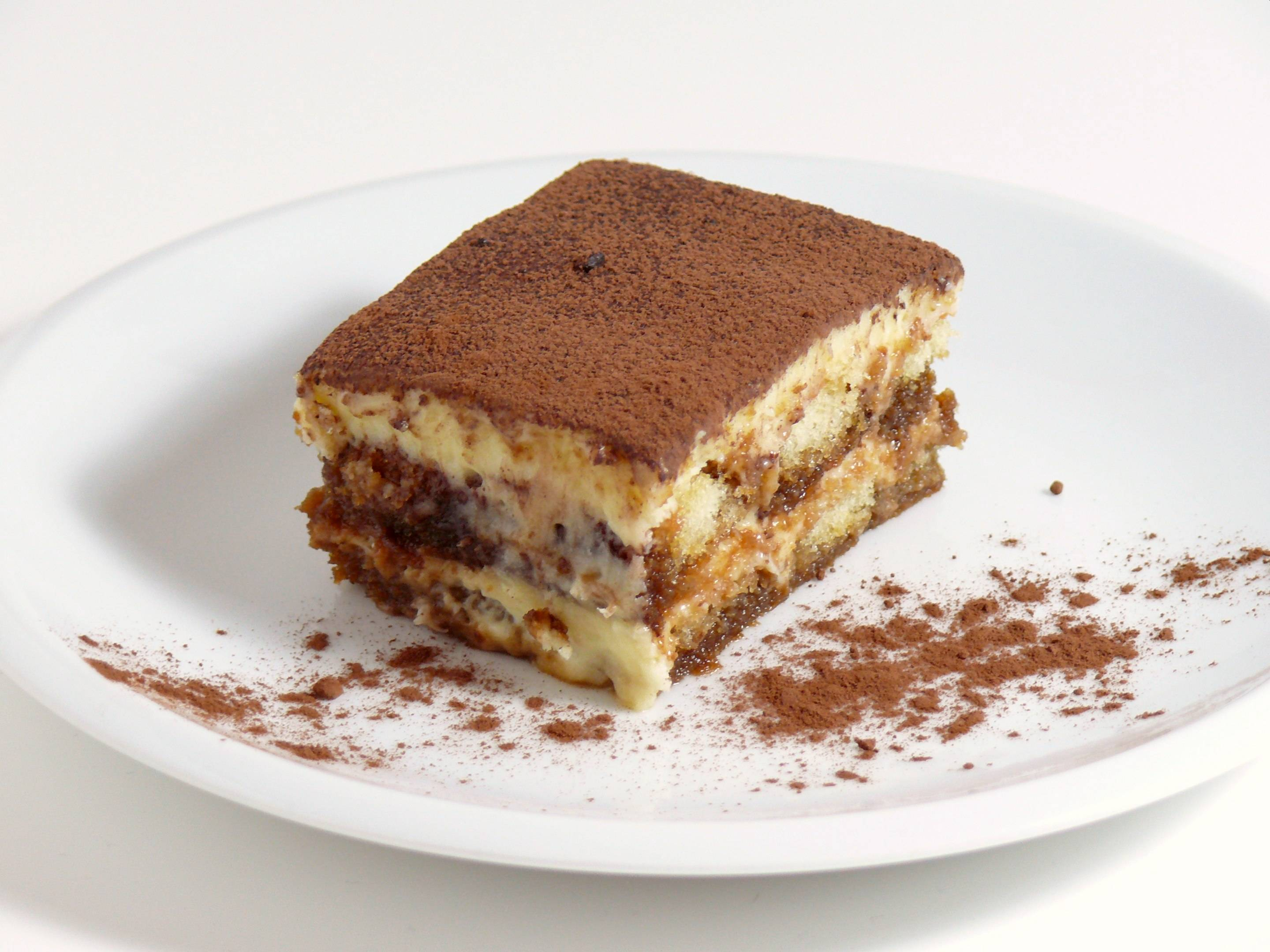
Tiramisu with cocoa powder garnish

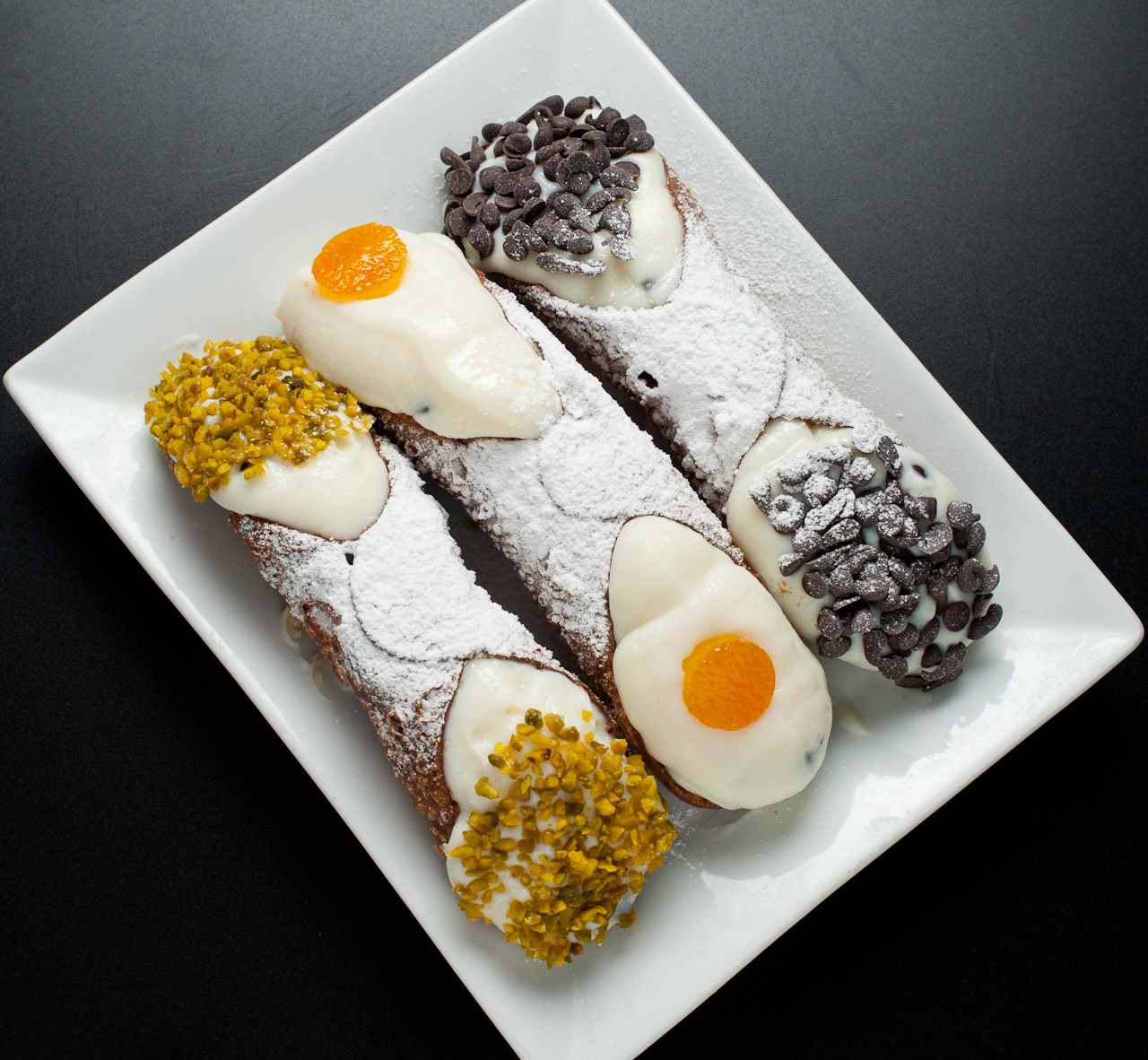
Cannoli with pistachio, candied fruit, and chocolate chips

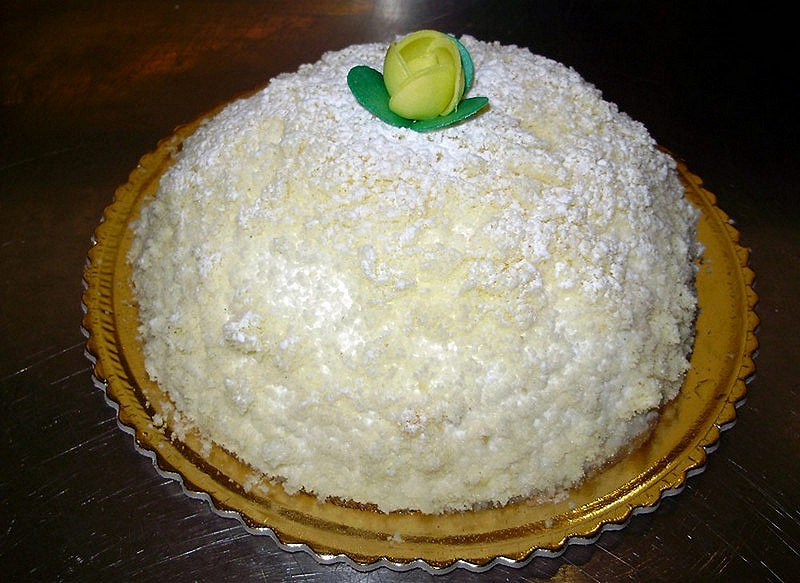
Torta mimosa

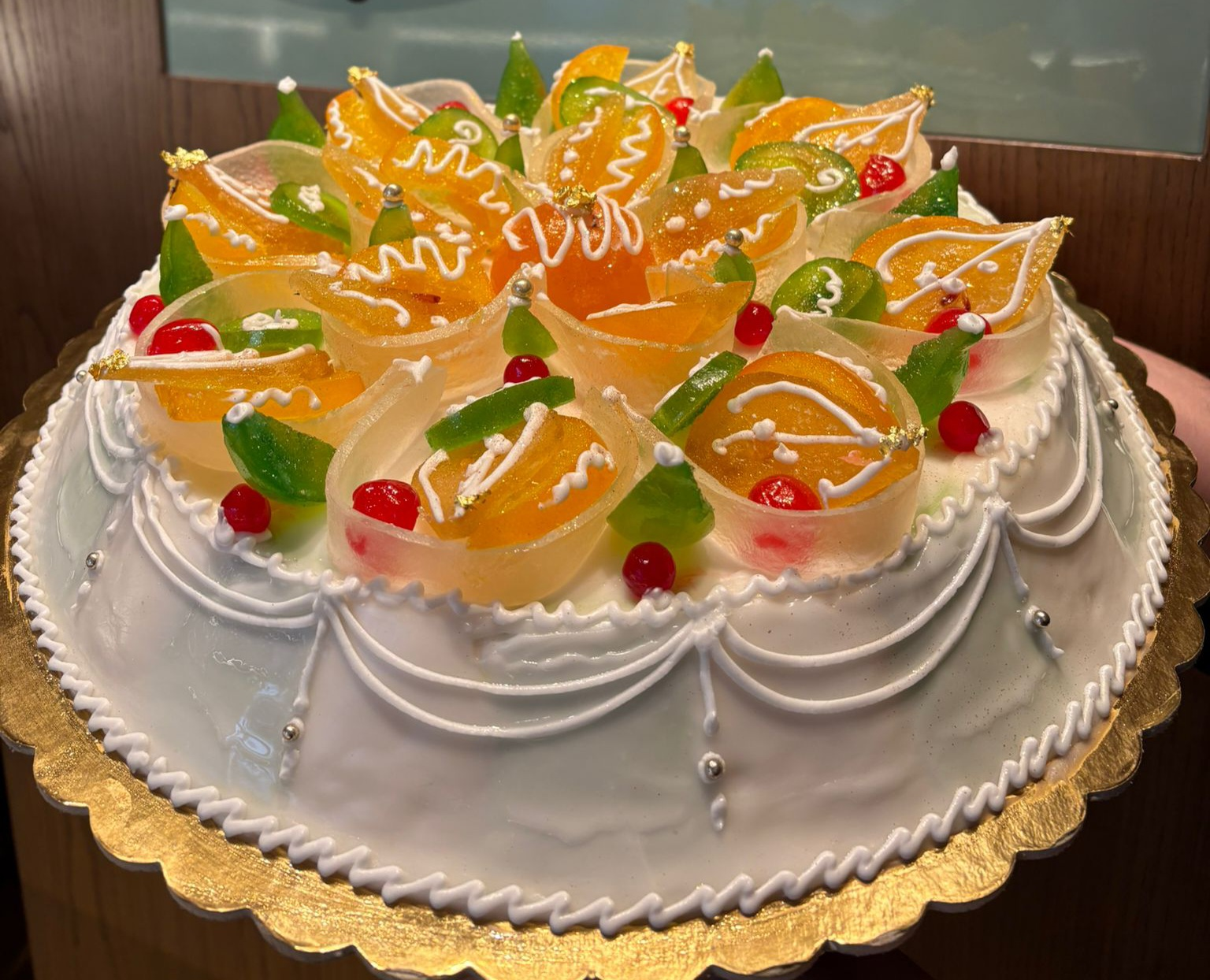
Cassata marzipan cake

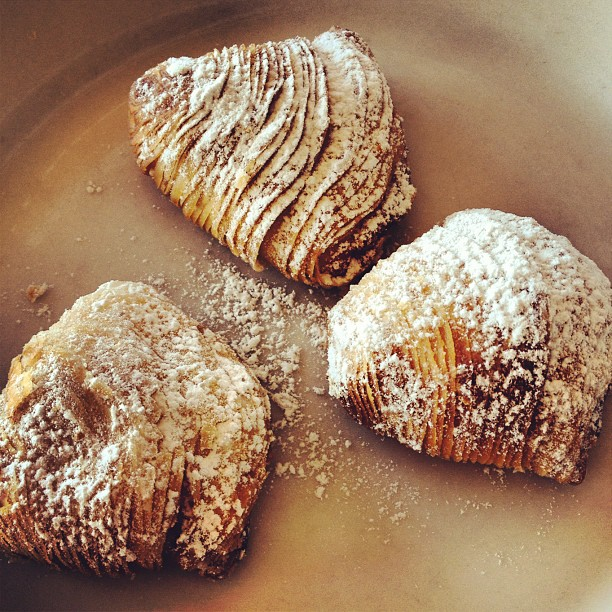
Sfogliatelle with custard filling

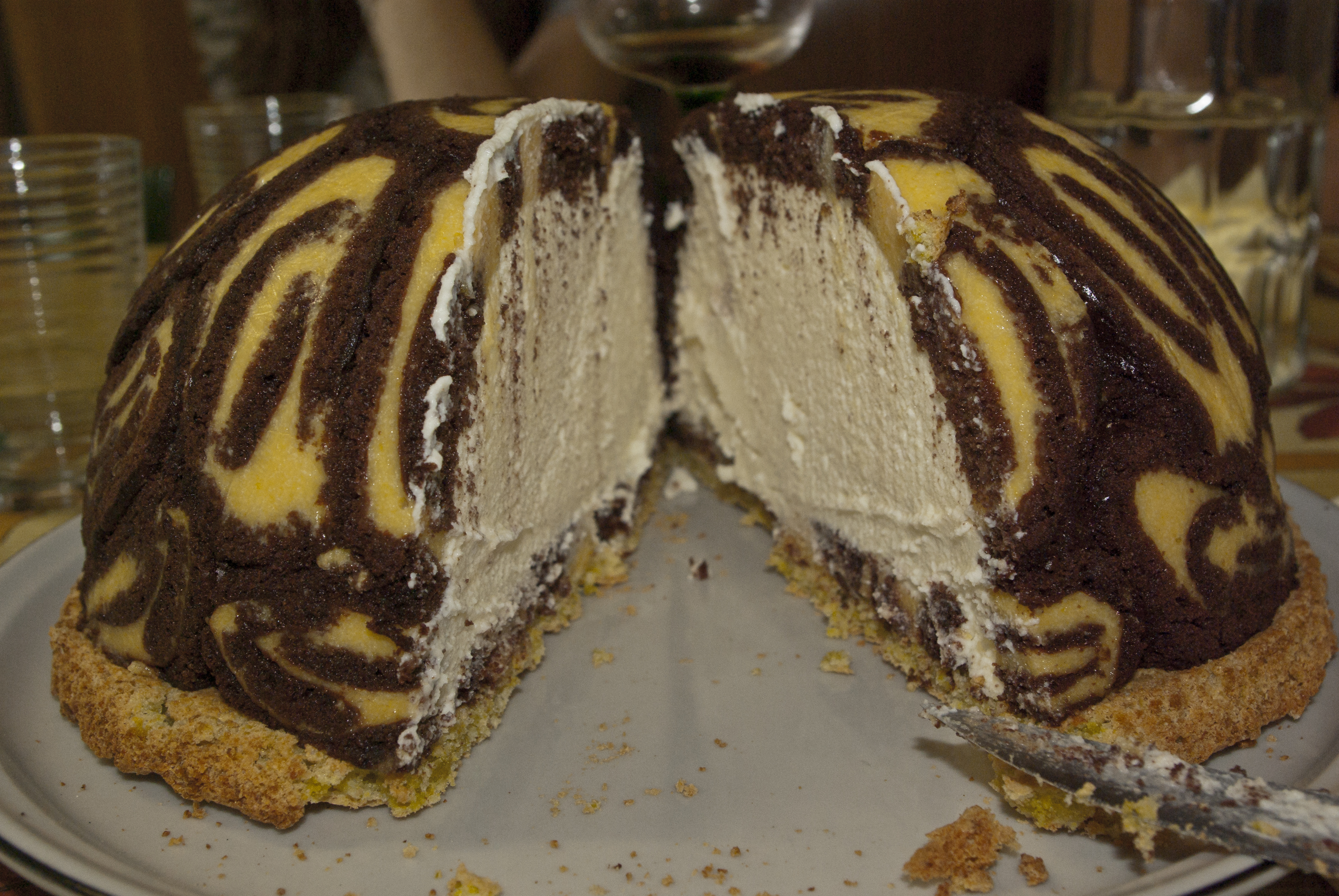
Zuccotto

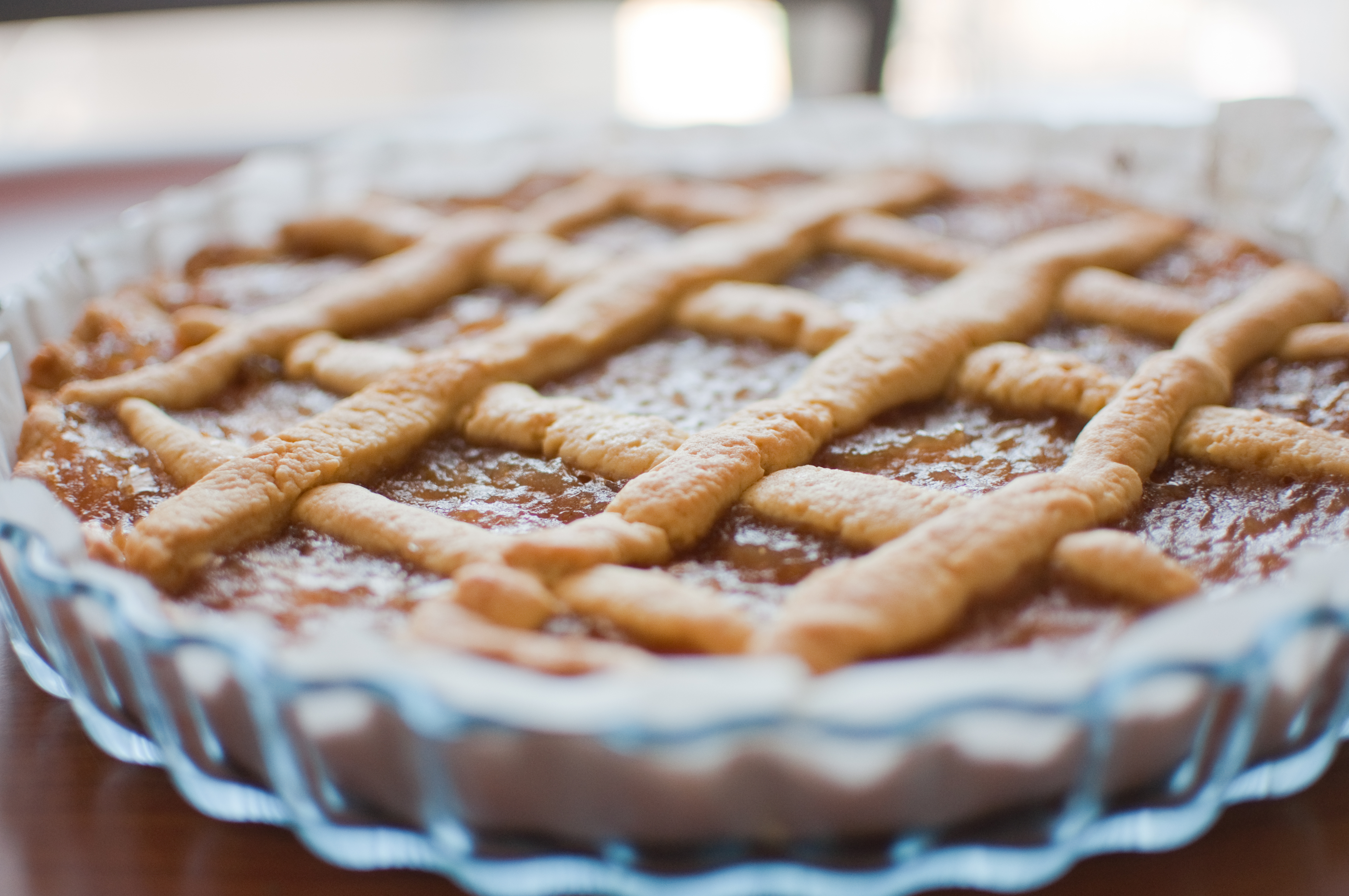
Crostata

== Holiday cuisine ==
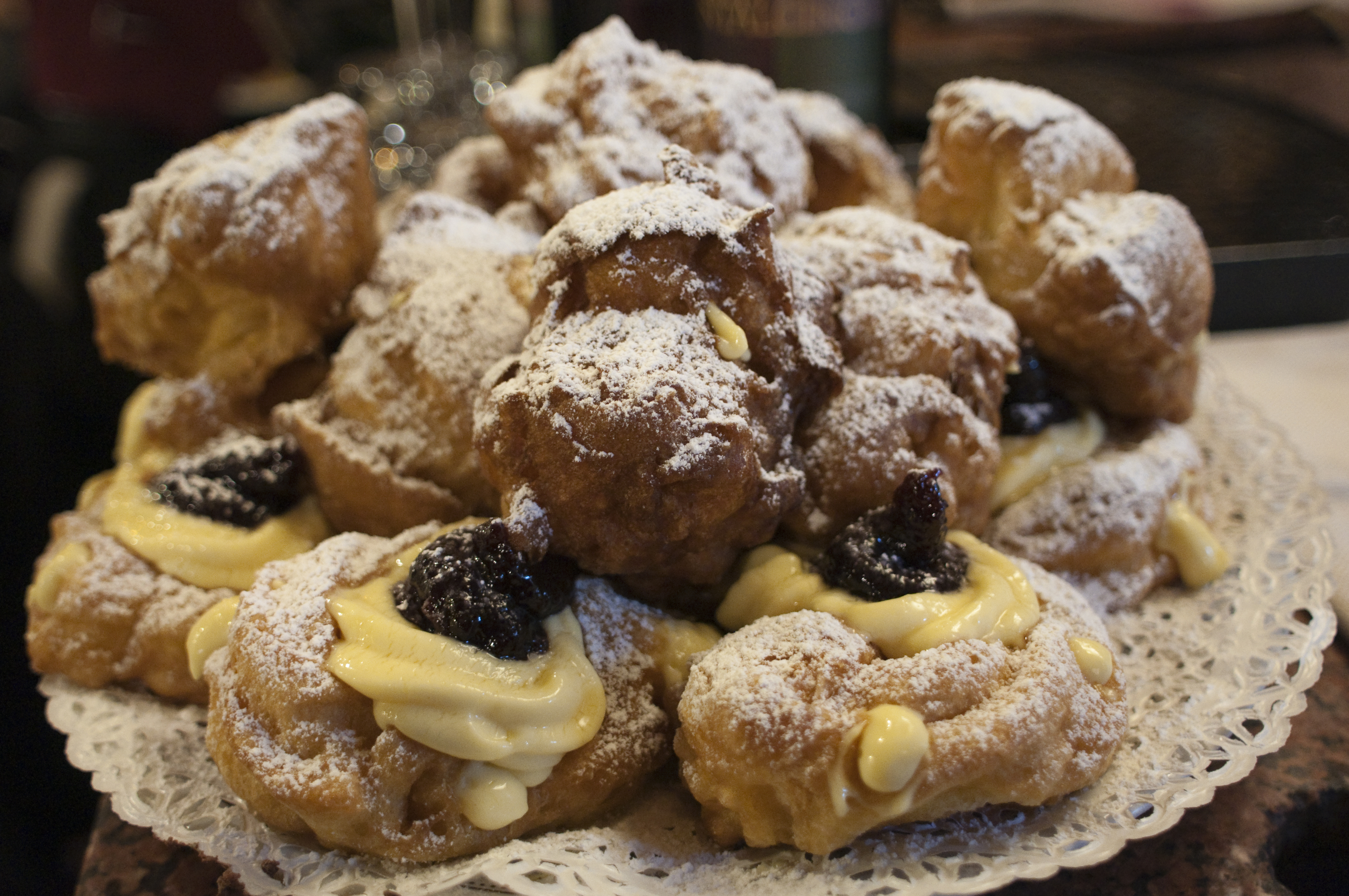
Zeppole

Every region has its own holiday recipes. During Festa di San Giuseppe ('Saint Joseph's Day') on 19 March, Sicilians give thanks to Saint Joseph for preventing a famine during the Middle Ages. The fava bean saved the population from starvation, and is a traditional part of St. Joseph's Day altars and traditions. Other customs celebrating this festival include wearing red clothing and eating zeppole.

On Easter Sunday, lamb (called abbacchio in central Italy) is served throughout Italy. The common cake for Easter Day is the colomba pasquale (lit. 'Easter dove'), which is often simply known as "Italian Easter Cake" abroad. It represents a dove, and is topped with almonds and pearl sugar.

On Christmas Eve a symbolic fast is observed with the cena di magro, a meatless meal, following traditional Catholic fasting practice. It is an elaborate and rich family dinner, based on fish and seafood. Typical cakes of the Christmas season are panettone and pandoro.

== International ==
=== Africa ===
==== Former Italian colonies ====
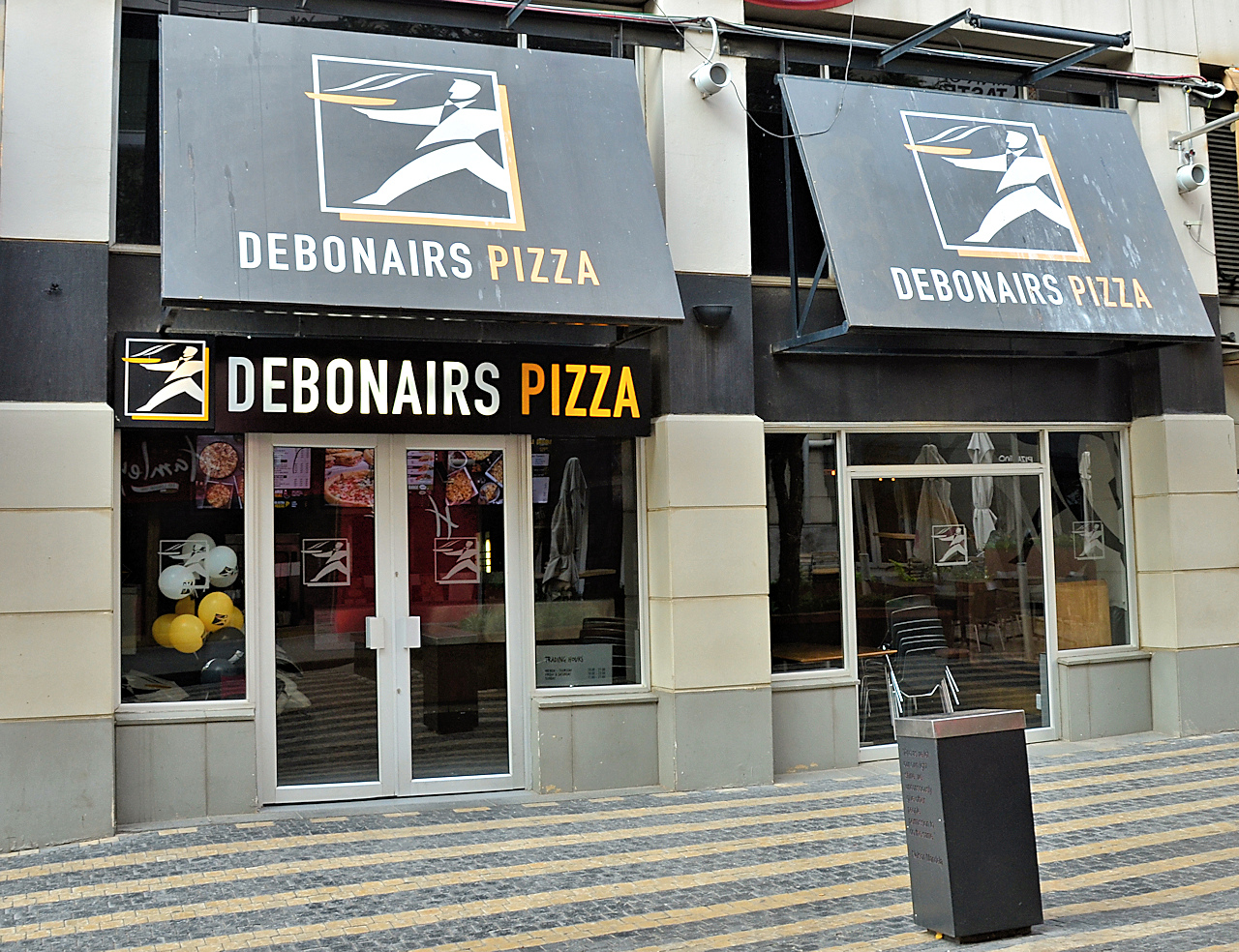
A pizzeria in Rosebank, Gauteng, South Africa

Due to several Italian colonies established in Africa, mainly in Ethiopia, Eritrea, Libya, and Somalia (except the northern part, which was under British rule), there is a considerable Italian influence on the cuisines of these nations.

==== South Africa ====
All major cities and towns in South Africa have substantial populations of Italian South Africans. Italian foods, such as prosciutto and cheeses, are imported, and some are also made locally. There is a wide range of Italian restaurants in South African cities, as well as pizzerias. The production of good quality olive oil is on the rise in South Africa, especially in the drier south-western parts where there is a more Mediterranean-type of rainfall pattern. Some oils have won top international awards.

=== Europe ===
==== Croatia ====
Italian cuisine includes some dishes that Dalmatian Italians and Istrian Italians brought with them following the Istrian–Dalmatian exodus, such as scampi alla busara, brudet, and Istrian jota.

==== France ====
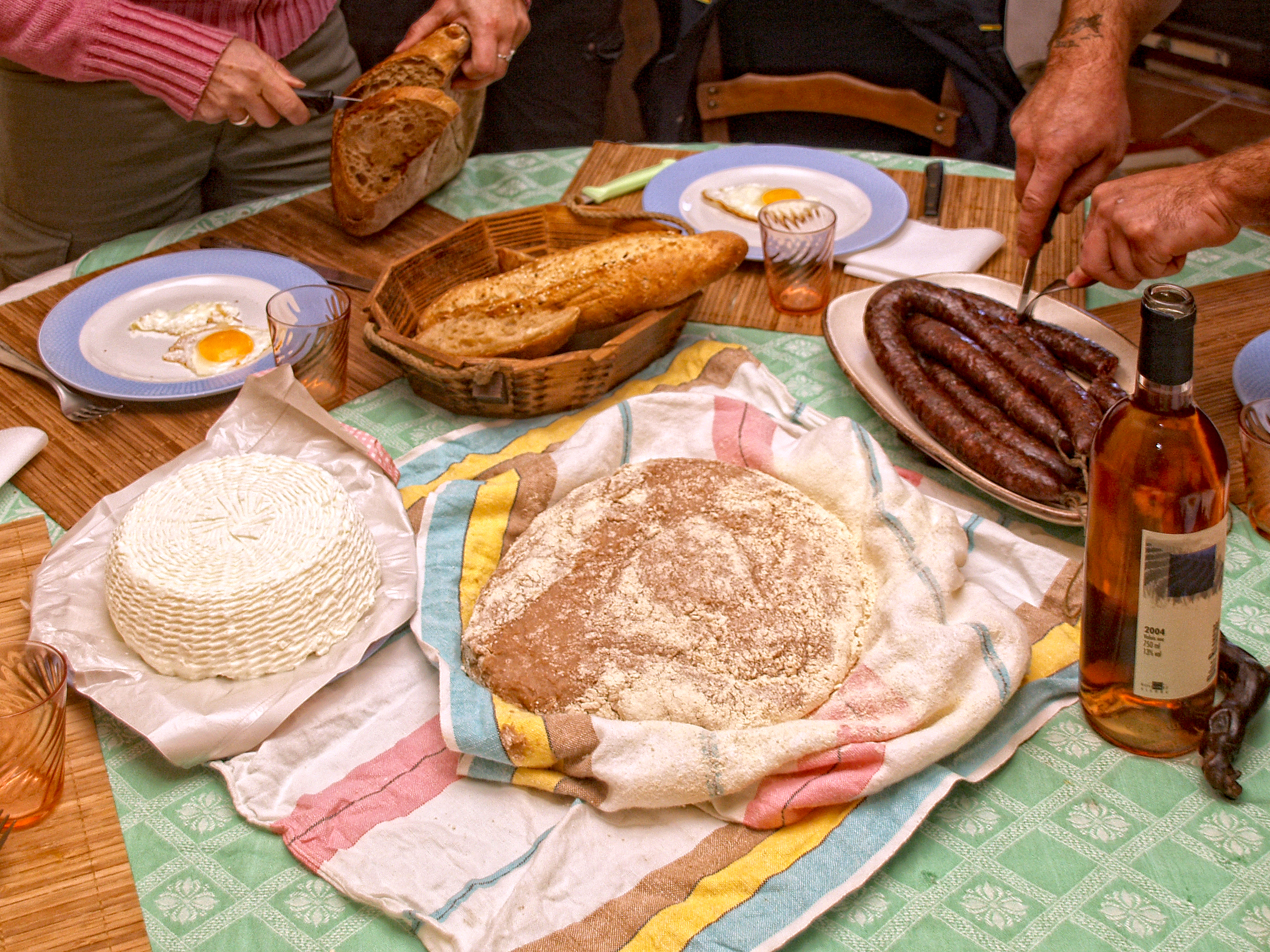
A traditional Corsican meal with (from left to right): brocciu, pulenda, and figatellu

In France the cuisine of Corsica has much in common with the Italian cuisine, since the island was, from the Early Middle Ages until 1768, a Pisan possession followed by a Genoese possession. The cuisine of the County of Nice was also influenced by Italian cuisine due to its proximity to Italy and the fact that the County of Nice belonged to the Kingdom of Piedmont-Sardinia until 1860, when it was annexed by France.

==== Malta ====
Maltese cuisine, given the proximity of Malta to Italy, shows strong Italian influences as well as influences from Spanish, French, Provençal, and other Mediterranean cuisines, with some later British culinary influence.

==== Monaco ====
Monégasque cuisine has undergone significant influences from Italian cuisine (especially Ligurian cuisine), given Monaco's proximity to Italian and French cuisine.

==== San Marino ====
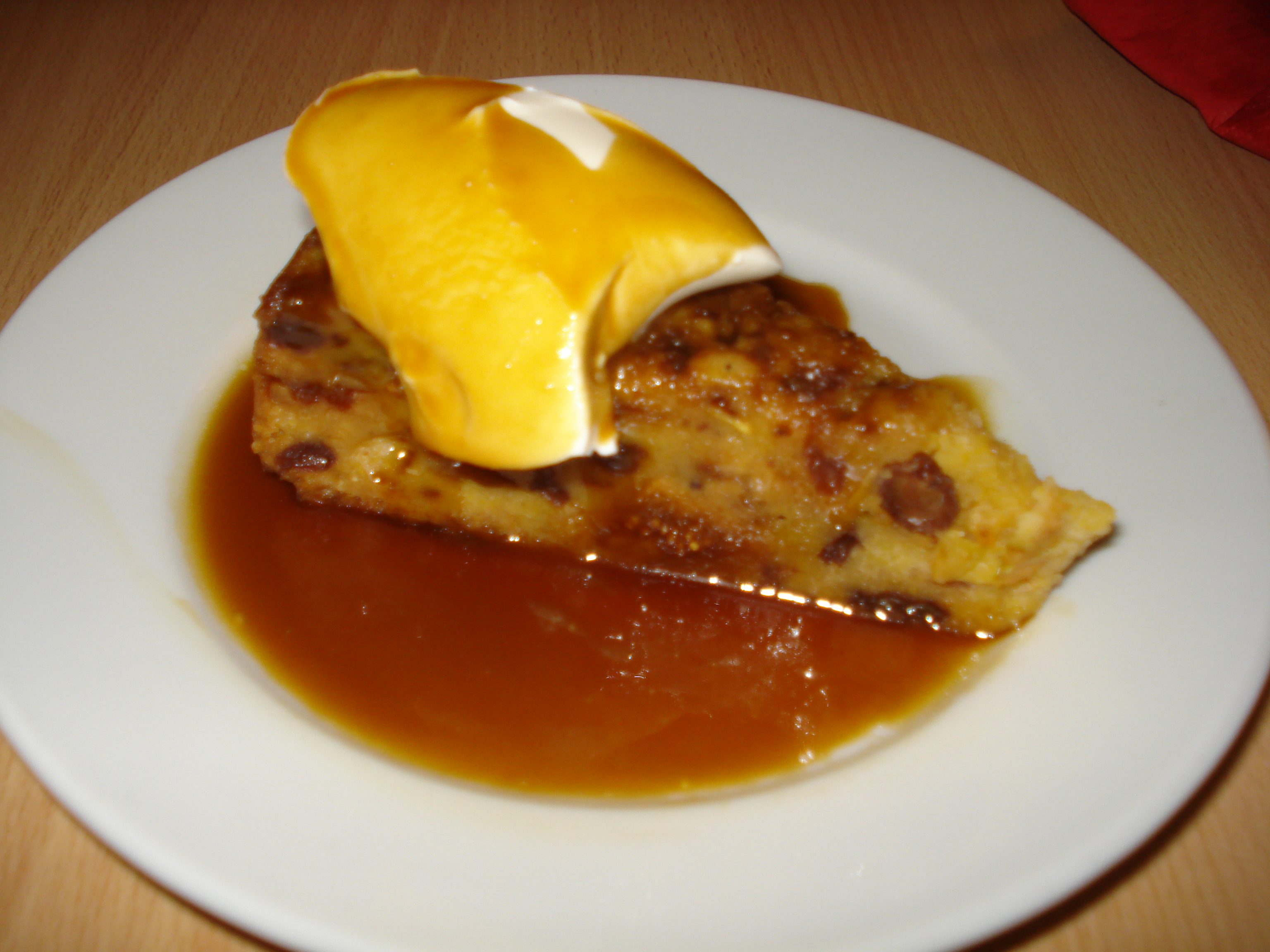
Bustrengo, a traditional Christmas dish in the Republic of San Marino

Sammarinese cuisine is strongly similar to Italian cuisine, especially that of the adjoining Emilia-Romagna and Marche regions. San Marino's primary agricultural products are cheese, wine, and livestock, and cheesemaking is a primary economic activity in San Marino.

==== Slovenia ====
Given the proximity of Slovenia to Italy, Slovenian cuisine was influenced by Italian cuisine. Slovenian dishes of Italian origin are njoki (similar to Italian gnocchi), rizota (the Slovenian version of risotto), and zilkrofi (similar to Italian ravioli).

==== Switzerland ====
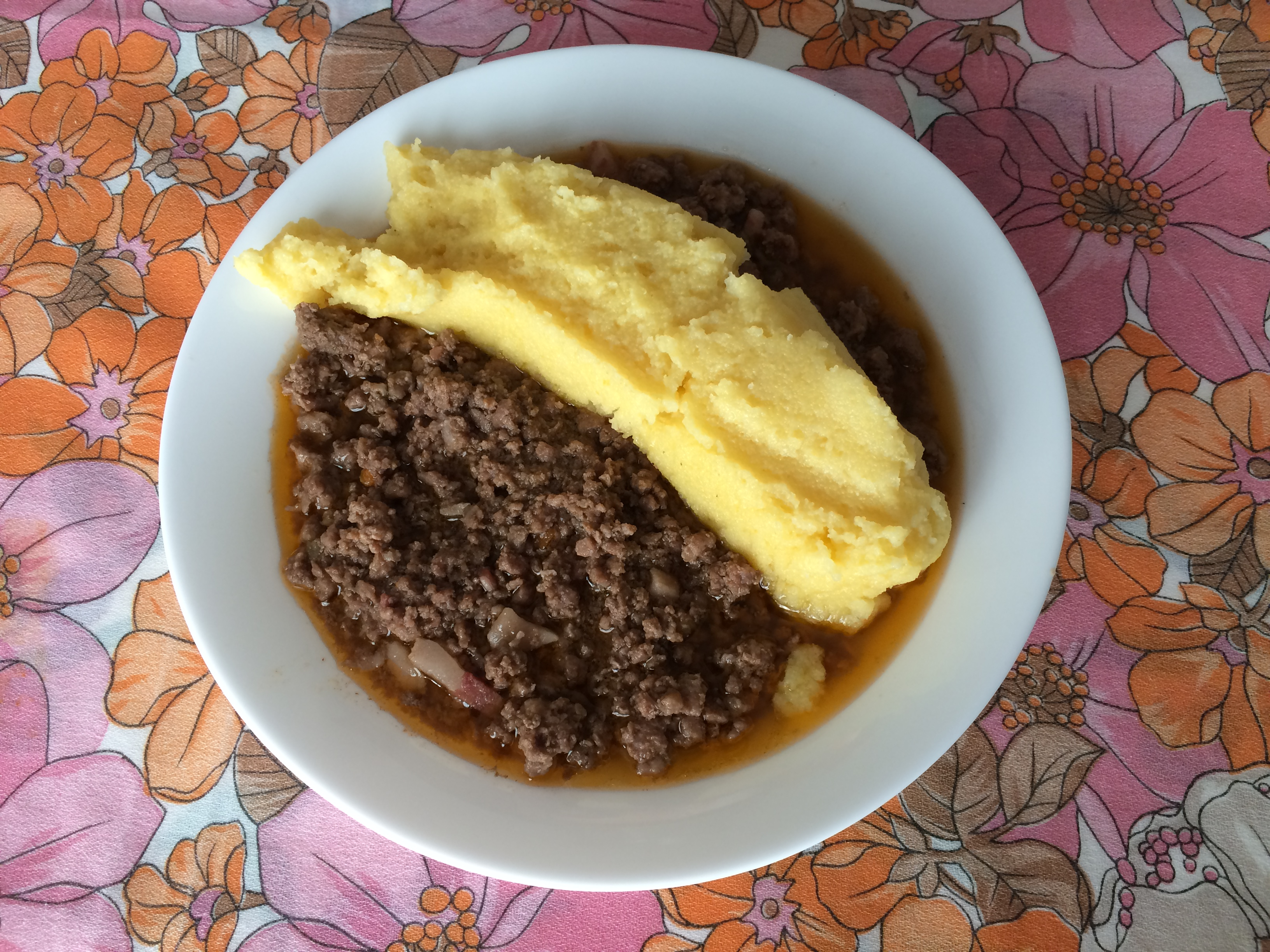
Bruscitti served with polenta porridge

The cuisine of the Canton of Ticino is greatly influenced by Italian cuisine and above all by Lombard cuisine due to the centuries-old domination of the Duchy of Milan and the economic and linguistic ties with Lombardy. The Italian-speaking part of Switzerland essentially coincides with Ticino, but also with the southern valleys of Grisons.

Popular dishes are polenta and risotto, often accompanied by luganighe and luganighetta, a type of Italian artisan sausage, or other regional cured meats, such as salami, coppa, and prosciutto. Risotto, in particular, is another common dish from Ticino.

Pizzoccheri is originated in Valtellina, a valley in the northern Italian region of Lombardy. They are also popular in Val Poschiavo, a side valley of Valtellina which belongs to the Swiss canton of Grisons. Bruscitti are an Italian single-course meal of the Lombard cuisine (Italy), of the Piedmontese cuisine (Italy), and of the cuisine of lower Ticino (Switzerland), based on finely chopped beef cooked for a long time. This dish is completed with the addition of polenta, risotto alla milanese or purée.

=== North and Central America ===
==== United States ====
Much of Italian-American cuisine is based on Italian cuisine, Americanized to reflect ingredients and conditions found in the United States. Italian Americans often identify foods with their regional heritage. Southern Italy staples include dry pasta, tomato sauce, and olive oil, whereas northern Italian staples include foods such as risotto, white sauce, and polenta.

Pizza arrived in the United States in the early 20th century along with waves of Italian immigrants who settled primarily in the large cities of the Northeast. It got a boost both in popularity and regional spread after soldiers stationed in Italy returned from World War II.

==== Mexico ====
Throughout the country the torta de milanesa is a common item offered at food carts and stalls. It is a sandwich made from locally baked bread and contains a breaded, pan-fried cutlet of pork or beef.

=== South America ===
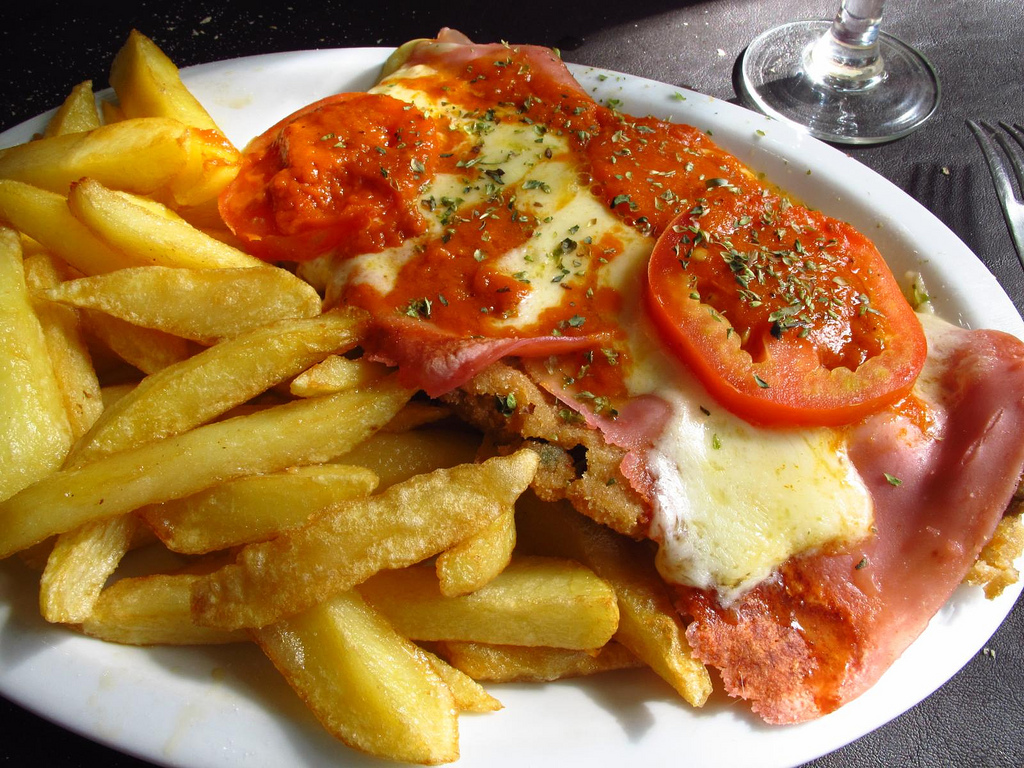
Milanesa a la napolitana with French fries, an Italian-inspired dish based on the original cotoletta alla milanese from Milan, Italy, common in South America

==== Argentina ====
Due to large Italian immigration to Argentina, Italian food and drink is heavily featured in Argentine cuisine. An example could be milanesa (the name comes from the original cotoletta alla milanese from Milan, Italy). There are several other Italian-Argentine dishes, such as sorrentinos and Argentine gnocchi.

==== Brazil ====
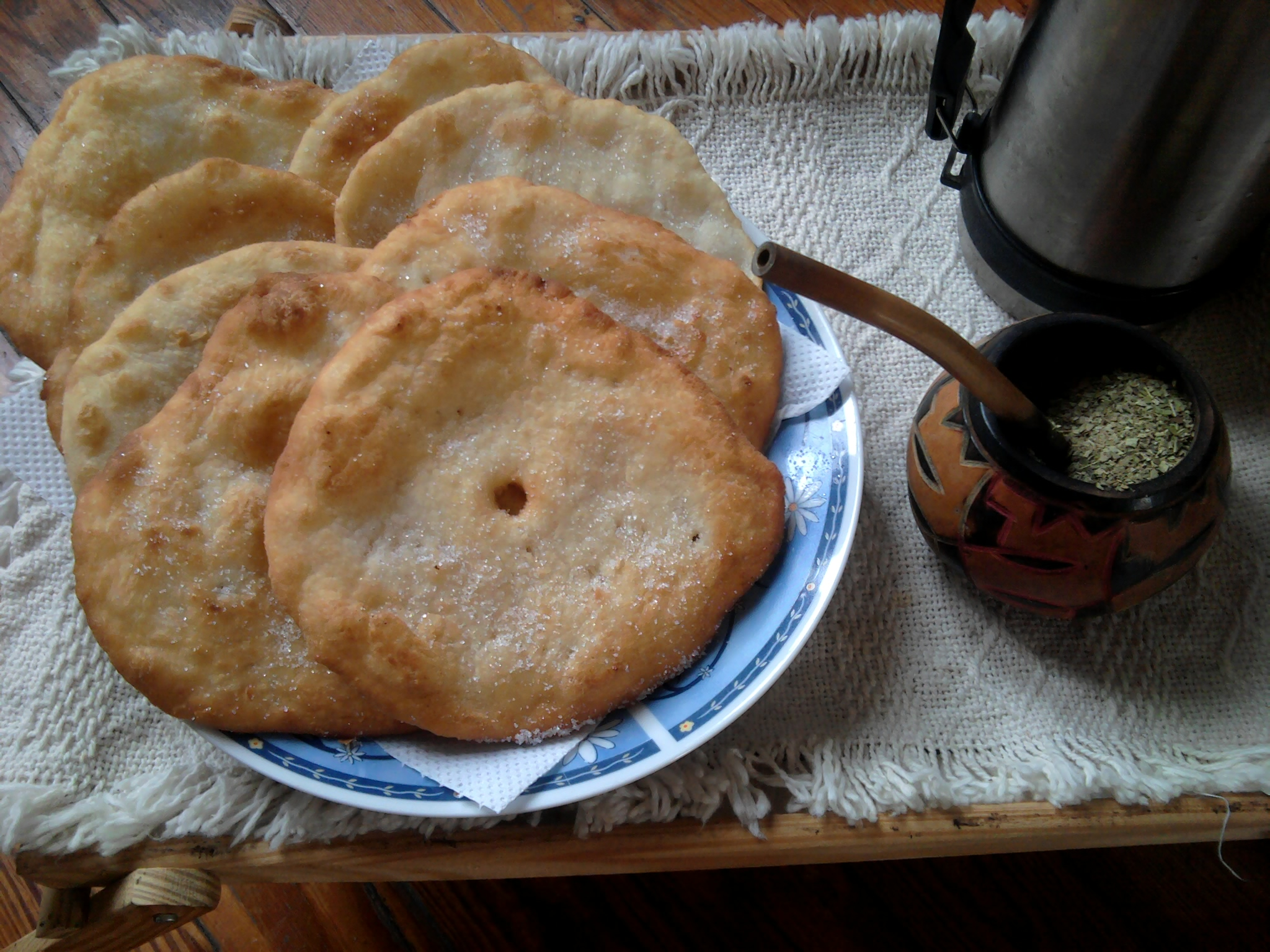
Uruguayan torta frita, which derives from Italian gnocco fritto

Italian cuisine is popular in Brazil, due to great immigration there in the late 1800s and early 1900s. Due to the huge Italian community, São Paulo is the place where this cuisine is most appreciated. The city has also developed its particular variety of pizza, different from both Neapolitan and American varieties, and it is largely popular on weekend dinners.

==== Uruguay ====
The conspicuous Italian immigration in Uruguay has strongly influenced Uruguayan cuisine, with a vast number of dishes deriving from Italian cuisine, with dishes from all Italian regions. In addition to the extensive use of pasta, including tallarines (Italian tagliatelle), raviolesi (Italian ravioli), capeletis (Italian cappelletti), and tortelines (Italian tortellini), they are part of the Uruguayan cuisine baña cauda (Italian bagna càuda), boloñesa (Italian ragù), cazuela de mondongo (Italian trippa alla milanese), pesto, and torta frita (Italian gnocco fritto).

==== Venezuela ====
Venezuelan cuisine is influenced by its European (Italian, Spanish, Portuguese, and French), West African, and indigenous traditions. Examples of Venezuelan dishes influenced by Italian cuisine, thanks to Italian immigration in this country, is pasticho (from the Italian pasticcio), which is the Venezuelan version of lasagna, and Pan Chabata bread, corresponding to the Italian ciabatta.

==== "Gnocchi del 29" ====
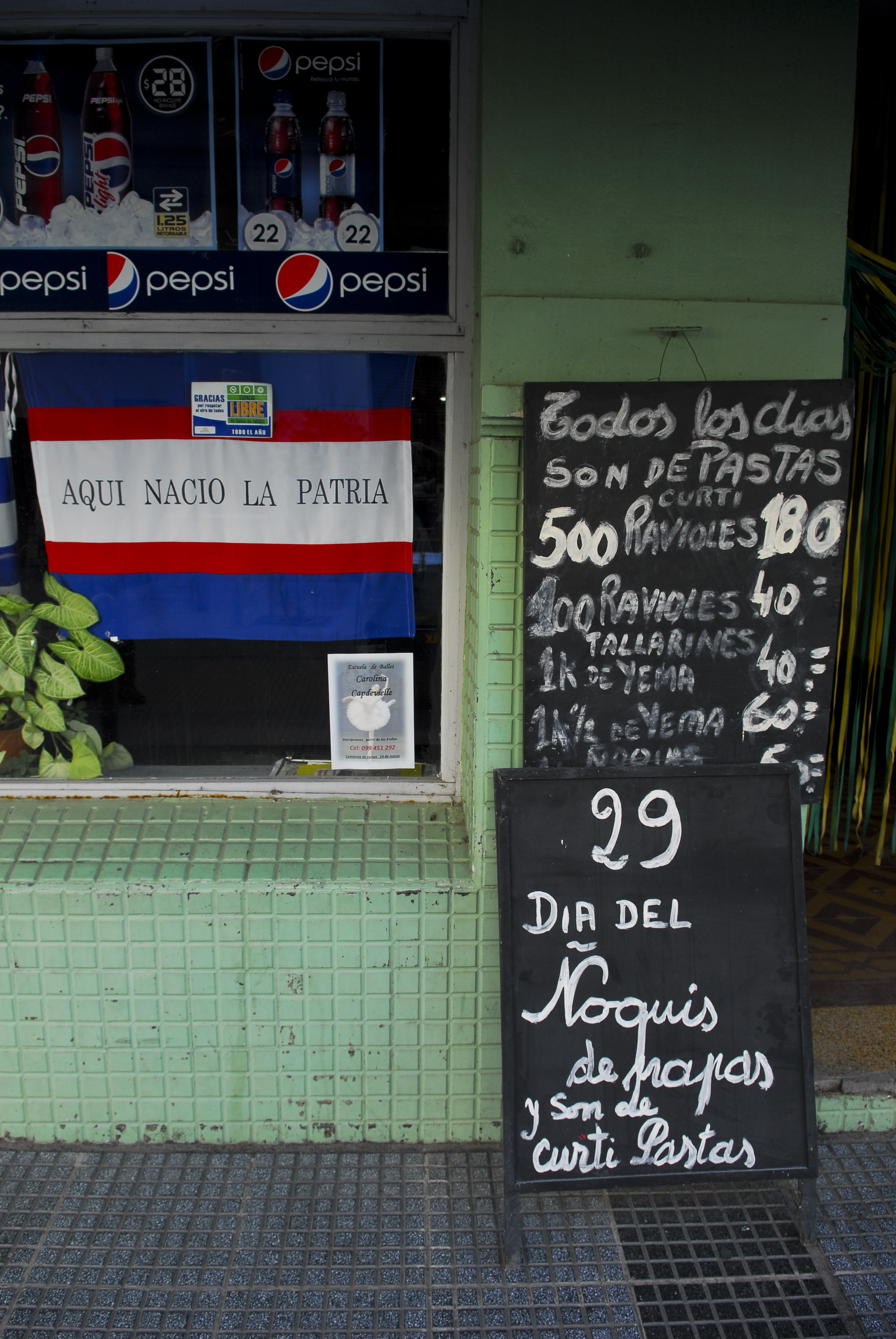
Billboard in front of a grocery store announcing "Gnocchi del 29" in the Soriano Department, Uruguay

The "gnocchi of 29" is a widespread custom in some South American countries of eating a plate of gnocchi on the 29th of each month. The custom is widespread especially in the states of the Southern Cone such as Brazil, Argentina, Paraguay, and Uruguay; these countries being recipients of a considerable Italian immigration between the end of the 19th century and the beginning of the 20th century. There is a ritual that accompanies lunch with gnocchi, namely putting money under the plate which symbolises the desire for new gifts. It is also customary to leave a banknote or coin under the plate to attract luck and prosperity to the dinner.

The tradition of serving gnocchi on the 29th of each month stems from a legend based on the story of Saint Pantaleon, a young doctor from Nicomedia who, after converting to Christianity, made a pilgrimage through northern Italy. There Pantaleon practiced miraculous cures for which he was canonized. According to legend, on one occasion when he asked Venetian peasants for bread, they invited him to share their poor table. In gratitude, Pantaleon announced a year of excellent fishing and excellent harvests. That episode occurred on 29 July, and for this reason that day is remembered with a simple meal represented by gnocchi.

=== Oceania ===
The conspicuous Italian immigration in Australia has strongly influenced Australian cuisine. Chicken parmigiana, based on a combination of the Italian parmigiana di melanzane with a cotoletta, was known in Australia by the 1950s. In 1952, the first espresso machines began to appear in Sydney (probably the first in Australia) and a plethora of fine Italian coffee houses were emerging in other Australian cities, such as Melbourne.

The Italian community in New Zealand, although much smaller than in Australia, still proved influential to the local food culture by combining imported Italian ingredients and techniques with local produce.

== See also ==
- Il cucchiaio d'argento – an Italian cookbook
- Il talismano della felicità by Ada Boni – an Italian cookbook
- Italian meal structure
- List of Italian foods and drinks
- List of Italian soups
- List of Italian cheeses
- List of Italian DOP cheeses
- List of Italian restaurants
- Italian wine
- Sammarinese cuisine
