= Abruzzese cuisine =

Culinary tradition of Abruzzo

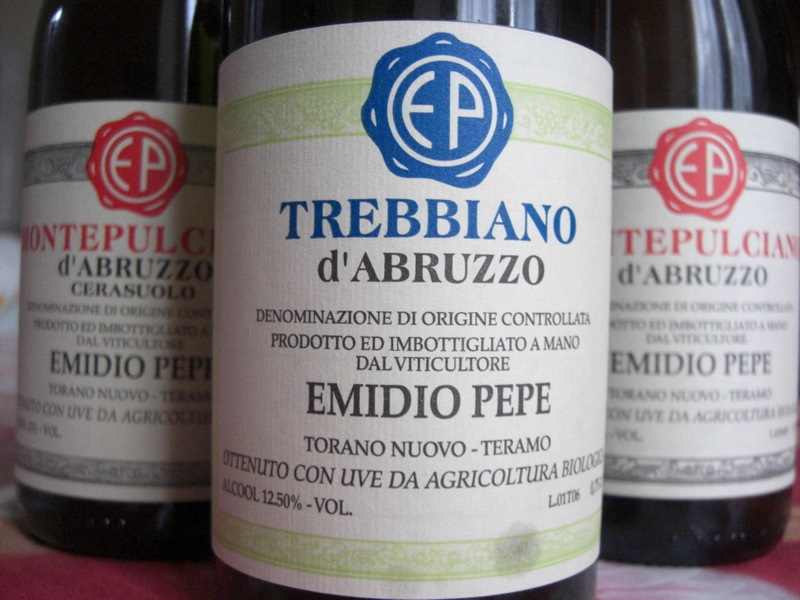
Montepulciano DOCG and Trebbiano d'Abruzzo DOC are considered amongst the world's finest wines.

Cuisine of Abruzzo is eclectic, drawing on pastoral, mountain, and coastal cuisine. Staples of Abruzzo cuisine include bread, pasta, meat, fish, cheese, and wine. The isolation which has characterized the region for centuries has ensured the independence of its culinary tradition from those of nearby regions. Local cuisine was widely appreciated in a 2013 survey among foreign tourists.

== Overview ==
Pasta, meat, and vegetables are central to the cuisine of Abruzzo. Chili peppers (Italian: peperoncini) are typical of Abruzzo, where they are called diavoletti (lit. 'little devils') for their spicy heat. Due to the long history of shepherding in Abruzzo, lamb dishes are common. Lamb meat is often paired with pasta. Mushrooms (usually wild mushrooms), rosemary, and garlic are also extensively used in Abruzzese cuisine.

Best-known is the extra virgin olive oil produced in the local farms on the hills of the region, marked by the quality level DOP . Wines such as Montepulciano DOCG and Trebbiano d'Abruzzo DOC also very notable. In 2012, a bottle of Trebbiano d'Abruzzo Colline Teramane ranked No. 1 in the top 50 Italian wine award. Centerbe is a strong (72% alcohol), spicy herbal liqueur drunk by the locals. Another liqueur is genziana, a soft distillate of gentian roots.

The best-known dish from Abruzzo is arrosticini, little pieces of castrated lamb on a wooden stick and cooked on coals. The chitarra (lit. 'guitar') is a variety of egg pasta, with a square cross section about 2–3 mm thick. In the province of Teramo, famous local dishes include the virtù soup (made with legumes, vegetables, and pork meat), the timballo (pasta sheets filled with meat, vegetables or rice), and the mazzarelle (lamb intestines filled with garlic, marjoram, lettuce, and various spices). The popularity of saffron, grown in the province of L'Aquila, has waned in recent years.

Seafood is also an important part of Abruzzo cuisine, with fish products such as brodetti (Brodetto alla vastese), scapece alla vastese, baccalà all'abruzzese, cozze allo zafferano, classic cooked mussels prepared with parsley, onion, bay leaf, white wine, and olive oil, and seasoned with L'Aquila saffron sauce, and coregone di Campotosto, typical lake fish.

== Ingredients ==
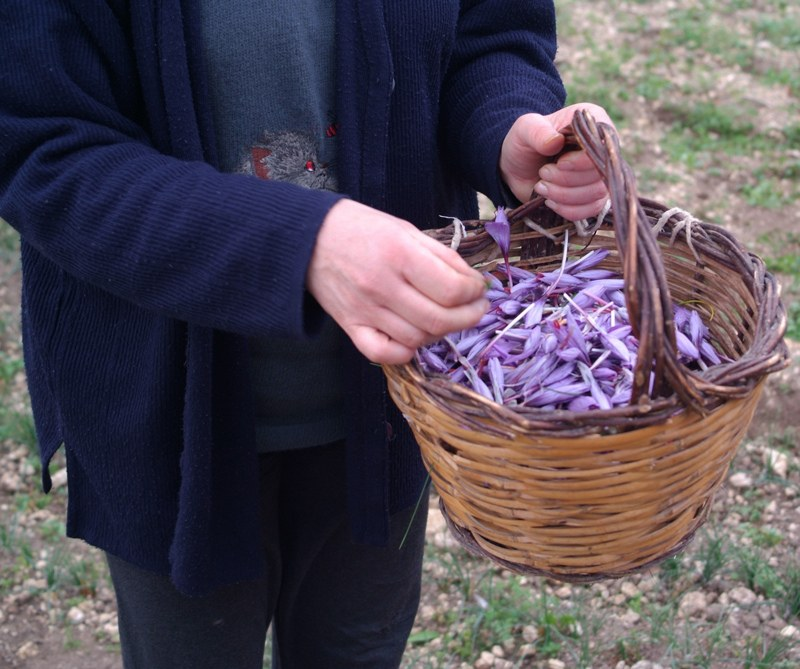
L'Aquila saffron

Abruzzese cuisine is known for the following ingredients:

- L'Aquila saffron, cultivated primarily in Navelli and L'Aquila
- Olive oil, produced in Colline Teramane (the Teramo hills), marked by the quality level DOP and considered some of Italy's best
- Liquorice of Atri, primarily produced in Abruzzo
- Lamb and mutton and goat meat, especially in the mountains. Sheep's milk (or ricotta) is an important source of Abruzzese cheese, and sheep intestines are used as sausage casing or for stuffed meat rolls. "Mountain goat" or chamois meat is also occasionally consumed in Abruzzo in mountainous areas.
- Truffles and mushrooms, particularly wild mushrooms from the forests and hills
- Red Sulmona Garlic, typical zone red garlic
- Rosemary
- Diavoletto d'Abruzzo, hot chili pepper, or peperoncini, regionally known as diavolilli, are very common in Abruzzese cuisine and often used to add spice or "heat" to dishes.
- Basil
- Vegetables, such as lentils, chickpeas, grasspeas and other legumes; as well as artichoke, eggplant, rapini, and cauliflower
- Fish, in the coast zone and lakes.

== Dishes ==
=== Starters ===
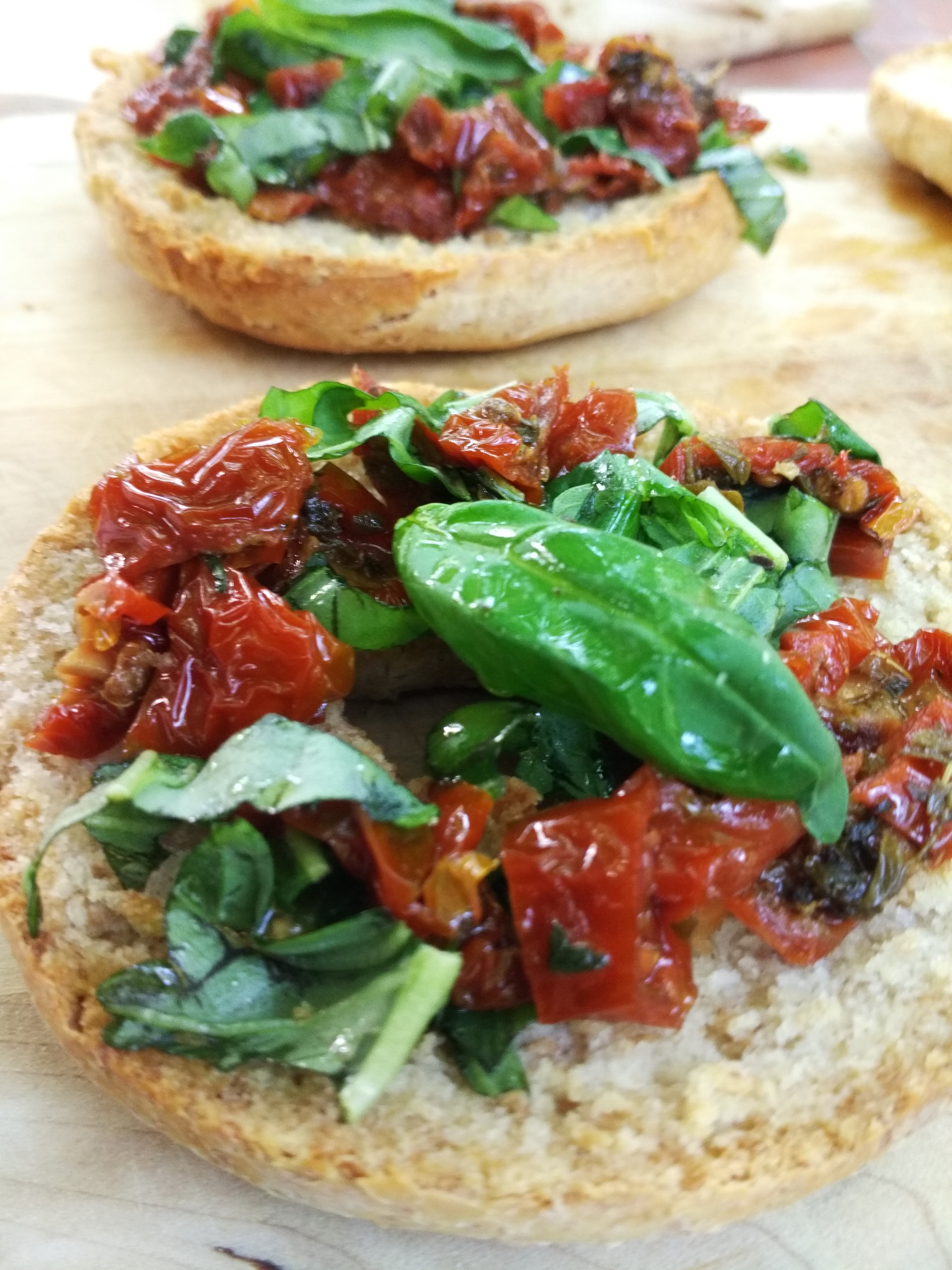
Bruschetta with chopped tomatoes and basil

Abruzzese starters (Italian: antipasti) include:

- Bruschetta: bread spread with salt and oil, sausage, or vegetables such as tomato or zucchini with mozzarella
- Antipasto di fegatini: appetizer from Teramo consisting of chicken livers, onion, peppers, vinegar, sugar, dry wine, pepper, salt and oil
- Mussels of Vasto: mussels stuffed with a mixture of breadcrumbs, garlic and parsley, olive oil, lemon juice, and tomato sauce
- Mussels with saffron: steamed mussels prepared with parsley, onion, bay leaf, white wine, olive oil, and saffron sauce
- Baccalà or "salt cod": cod cooked in a pan with potatoes, tomatoes, oil, garlic, parsley, onion, red pepper, salt, and black olives
- Salsa all'aquilana: beef marrow with saffron, eggs, cream and butter
- Ancient Abruzzo sauce: it is a sauce made with parsley, basil, sage, celery, rosemary, carrots and salt; it is used as a condiment for meats, roasts, sauces and soups.
- Orange appetizer: they are slices of oranges with anchovy fillets, extra-virgin olive oil and salt.
- Spur anchovies: anchovies fried with flour, eggs, oil, white vinegar, parsley and salt.
- Cazzimperio: Abruzzo version of the classic pinzimonio with caciocavallo cheese, whole milk, butter, egg yolks, flour, salt, pepper, slices of stale bread.
- Pizza con le sfrigole: it is a white pizza with mass dough, lard, salt and precisely the "sfrigole", or the crunchy flakes of fat and connective tissues that remained in the pan when lard was once prepared at home.
- Sulmona garlic-flavoured bruschetta: classic bruschetta spread with garlic, salt and oil.
- Liver sausage bruschetta: classic bruschetta with liver sausages, homemade bread, oil and salt to taste.
- Marinara appetizer: mixed fish appetizer with squid, clams and scampi dressed with a sauce made up of anchovies, tuna, capers, vinegar, garlic, and parsley.
- Crostini alla chietina: homemade triangular slices of bread dipped in beaten egg and fried in a pan, preferably with olive oil, garnished with anchovies, capers and butter.
- L'Aquila sauce: mixture of ox marrow with saffron from Abruzzo, eggs, cooking cream, butter.
- Baked chickpea croquettes: these are croquettes made with chickpeas, water, tomato, carrots, chilli pepper, bay leaf, onion, garlic, salt, chopped parsley and oil.

=== Pasta ===
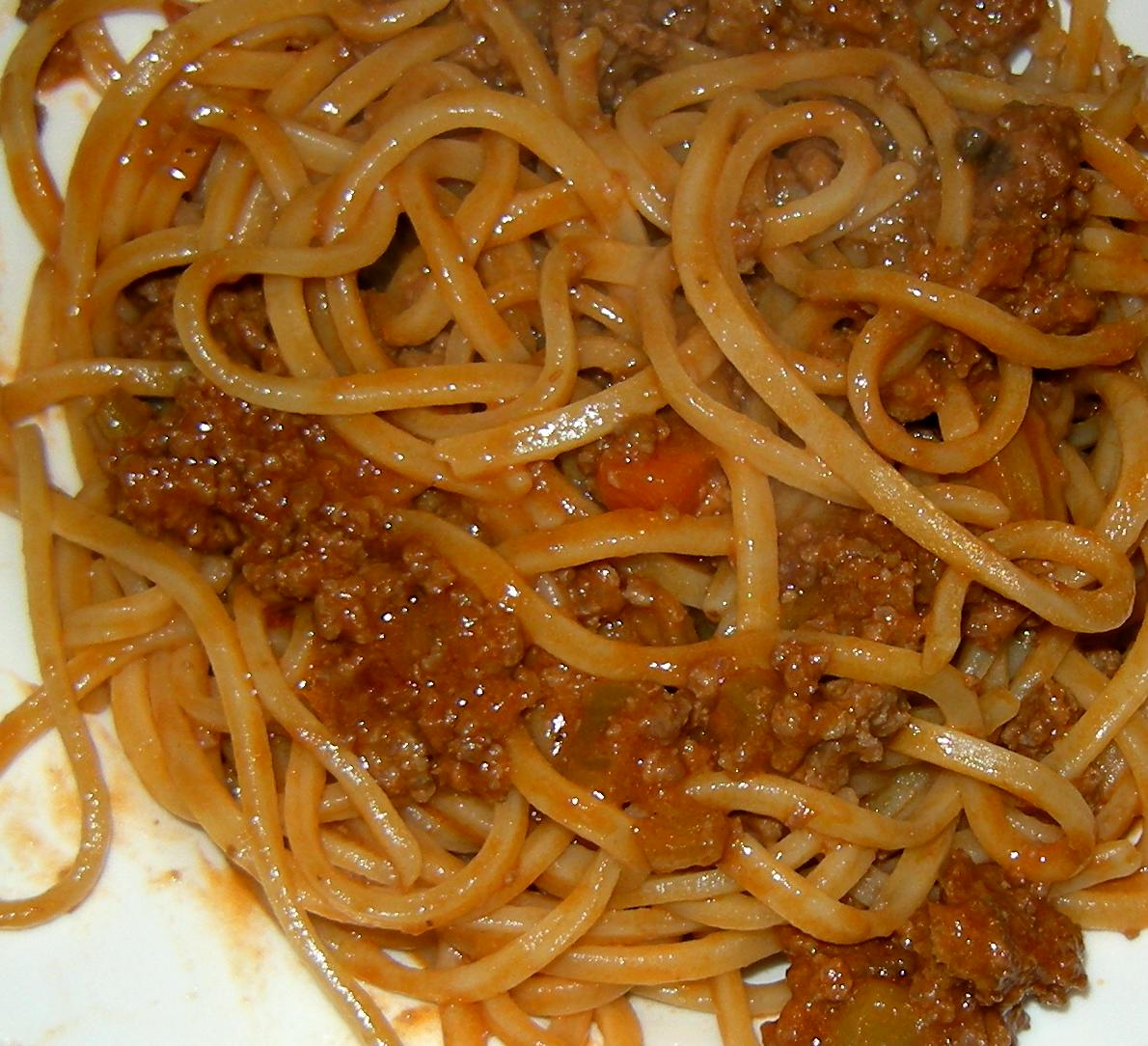
Maccheroni alla chitarra

Popular pasta dishes are:

- Maccheroni alla chitarra. The pasta is prepared by pressing dough through a chitarra, creating long, thin noodles similar to spaghetti. It is served with a tomato-based sauce, often flavored with chili peppers, pork, goose or lamb
- Sagne e fagioli (flavored with tomatoes, garlic, oil, and peperoncini)
- Gnocchi carrati, flavored with bacon and pecorino cheese
- Pastuccia (polenta with sausage, eggs, and cheese)
- Maccheroni alla molinara: are an uneven type of thick, hand-made pasta or spaghetti, 4-6mm, using just flour, semolina and water. Often served with tomato sauce and chili peppers (or peperoncini)
- Fettuccine all'abruzzese: pasta with bacon, pecorino and Parmesan
- Amatriciana sauce: it is a condiment originating from the Amatrice area which until 1927 was included in the province of L'Aquila, which subsequently became a typical dish of Roman cuisine and widespread throughout the Sabine area of Abruzzo and especially in L'Aquila and Cicolano. The main ingredients are bacon, pecorino and tomato.
- Rintrocele o Rintrocilo o i'ntrucioloni: rintrocele is a long pasta (poor dough without eggs, only durum wheat and water) typical of the Lanciano area. Generally it is made with sheep's sauce or with the typical lamb sauce.
- Pasta allo sparone: sparone in dialect means "rag"; in fact this fresh pasta (filled with spinach, ricotta and grated cheese) is cooked all wrapped up in a white cloth. After boiling, the sparone is removed and the pasta is cut into rounds and seasoned with tomato sauce, then browned in the oven.
- Maltagliati or tajulini: pasta to be accompanied, for example, with bean soup.
- Pasta alla mugnaia: egg pasta resulting from a mix of flours, which is characterized by its elongated and irregular shape and particular consistency, usually seasoned with a very rich meat sauce. It is typical of Elice where the homonymous festival is also celebrated every year.

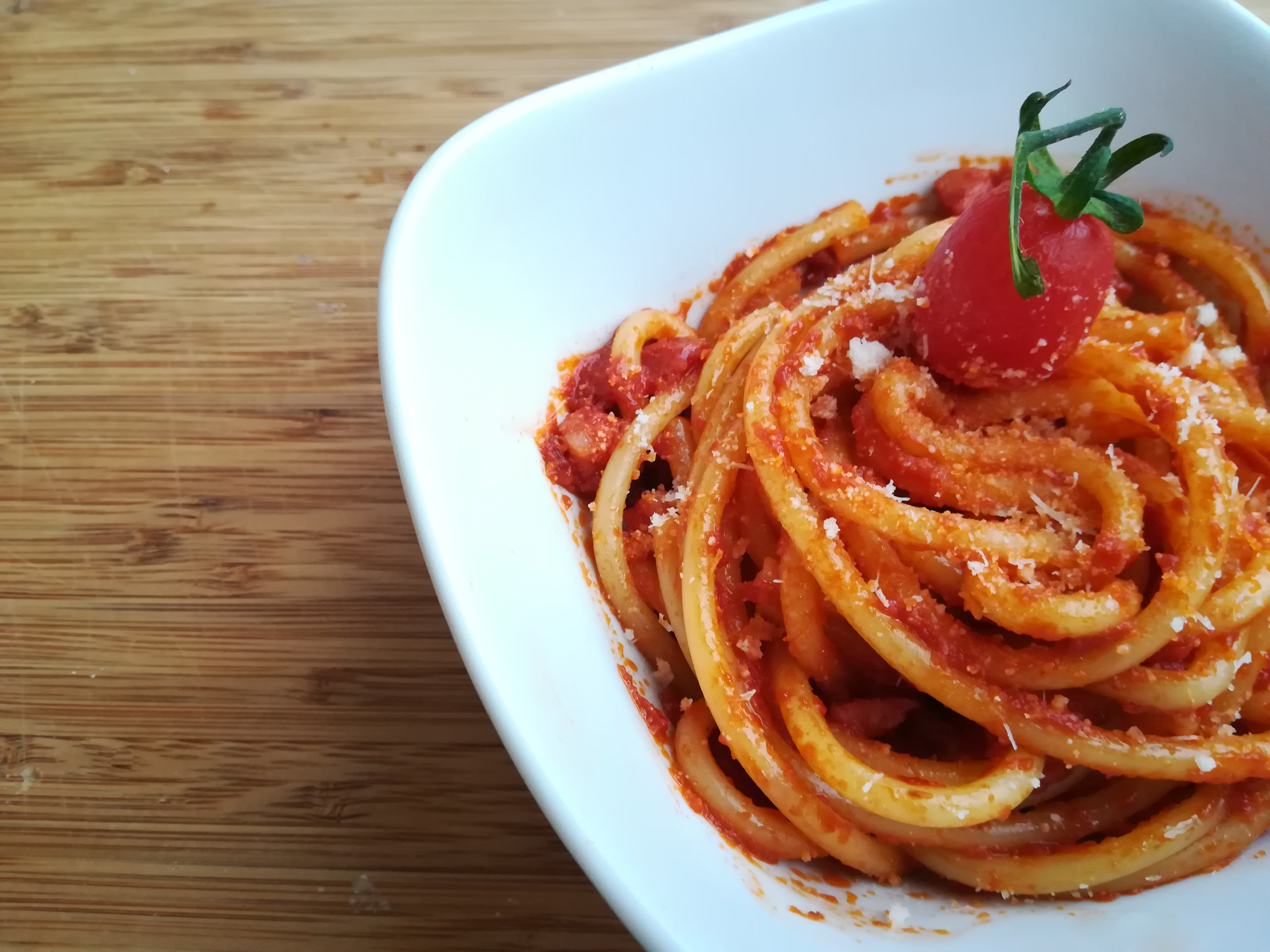
Bucatini with amatriciana sauce. It is a condiment originating from the Amatrice area which until 1927 was included in the province of L'Aquila, which subsequently became a typical dish of Roman cuisine.

- Sagne e fagioli (fasciule): pasta made with water, salt and flour, with a characteristic strip shape, accompanied by a tomato sauce and very moist beans.
- Ceppe: homemade pasta. It is formed from egg-free dough, and has the characteristic shape obtained by passing a strip of dough about 3-4 centimeters long and 1 centimeter wide around a log. It is excellent with wild boar meat ragù. Typical of the Civitella del Tronto area, in the Teramo area.
- Ndurciulline: this pasta is characteristic of the area crossed by the ancient L'Aquila-Foggia sheep track, also called Tratturo Magno, in the section between Lanciano and Cupello. It is a fresh handmade pasta, made from durum wheat semolina and soft wheat flour, of an opaque ivory color, cut into long thin spaghetti with a rectangular section. To be able to fully enjoy the 'ndurcciullune they must be seasoned with a sauce based on sheep (with which rolls are prepared with a filling made up of chopped aromatic herbs, garlic, parsley, pork bacon or lard) tomato pieces, extra virgin olive oil and various aromatic spices. This dish was born from the encounter between the peasant culture and the pastoral one, which took place during the transhumance.

=== Meat ===
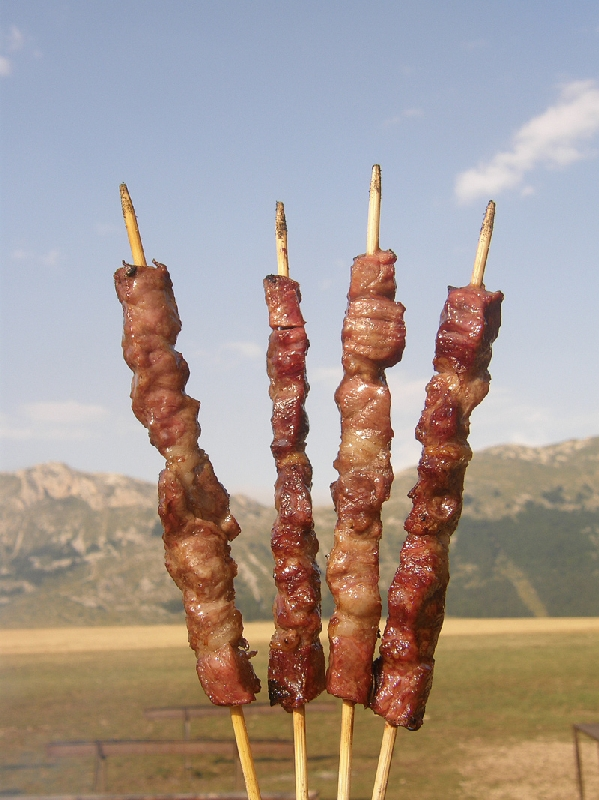
Arrosticini

- The region features several types of roast lamb and sheep, including:
  - Arrosticini: skewered lamb or sheep
  - Pecora alla callara: lamb or sheep stuffed with mountain herbs and cooked in a copper pot
  - Lamb cooked whole in a bread oven
  - Agnello cacio e ovo: a lamb-based fricassee
  - Mazzerelle: lamb intestines stuffed with lamb, garlic, marjoram, lettuce, and various spices
- Non-sheep meat dishes
  - Le virtù: a soup from Teramo with legumes, vegetables and pork, usually eaten in the spring at celebrations
  - Timballo abruzzese: lasagna-like dish with pasta sheets (scrippelle) layered with meat, vegetables and rice; often served for Christmas and Easter
  - Porchetta abruzzese: moist boneless-pork roast, slow-roasted with rosemary, garlic, and black pepper or chili pepper, sometimes along with other spices. It was brought by Abruzzese immigrants to the northeastern United States (particularly Philadelphia), where it is known as "Italian roast pork" or "roast pork".
  - Turkey alla canzanese: typical dish of Canzano, a small town near Teramo, the turkey is served cold, together with the jelly obtained by letting the cooking broth rest and cool.
  - 'Ndocca 'ndocca: it is the classic poor peasant dish in which all the parts of the pig are used (ears, snout, rind, feet, ribs) which cannot become hams or cured meats. Typical of the Teramo area.
  - Coratella: animal entrails where parts such as heart, liver and lungs, kidneys, spleen, windpipe and sweetbreads are used (sometimes uses sheep)

=== Seafood ===
Seafood also plays an important role in the cuisine of Abruzzo, especially areas near the coast. The main fish dishes of Abruzzo are:

- Brodetto: a fish broth from Vasto, Giulianova and Pescara, is cooked in an earthenware pot and flavored with tomatoes, herbs, and peperoncino.
- Scapece alla vastese (marinated fish), from Vasto; it is the only dish in Abruzzo to use saffron, one of the region's most important products. The fish (often skate) is cut into pieces, floured and browned in a frying pan. The vinegar-based marinade can preserve the fish for 20 to 30 days in wooden containers which are passed from generation to generation.
- Baccalà all'abruzzese: another seafood dish of region: is a cod cooked in a pan with potatoes, tomatoes, oil, garlic, parsley, onion, red pepper, salt, and black olives.
- Coregone di Campotosto: typical fish product of Lake Campotosto, it is cooked roasted on the grill and then marinated in a preparation of vinegar and with oil and chilli pepper.

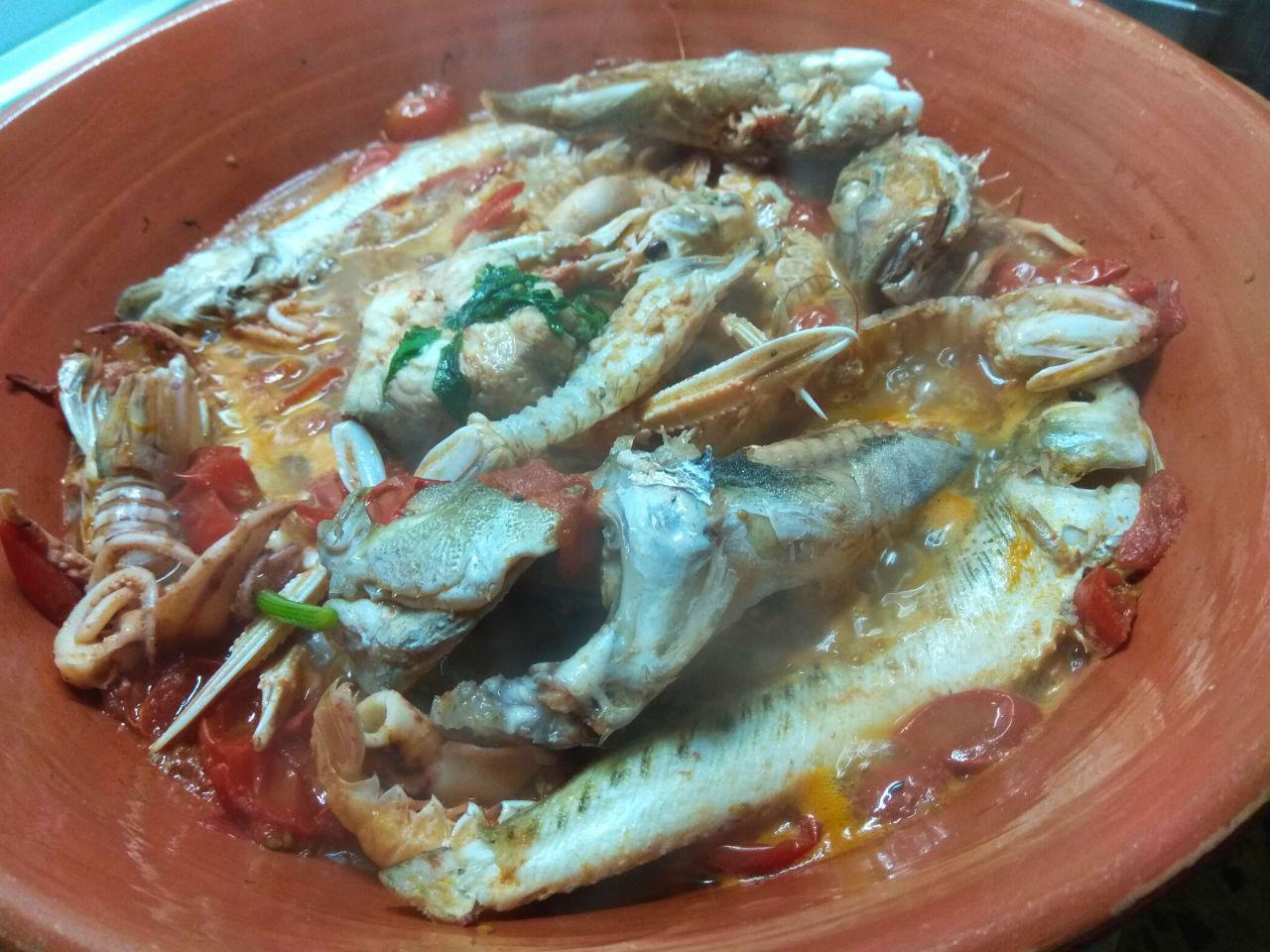
Brodetto alla vastese

- Mussels with saffron: classic cooked mussels prepared with parsley, onion, bay leaf, white wine, olive oil and seasoned with L'Aquila saffron sauce
- Marinated anchovies: they are seasoned anchovies marinated with garlic, parsley, oregano, lemon, oil, salt, pepper.
- Marinara appetizer: mixed fish appetizer with squid, clams and scampi seasoned with a sauce composed of anchovies, tuna, capers, vinegar, garlic, and parsley.
- Raw squid: typical of Pescara, they are squid boiled in vinegar, and then seasoned with chopped garlic sauce, extra virgin olive oil, lemon juice, salt and hot pepper.
- Vastese-style mussels: stuffed mussels with a mixture of breadcrumbs, minced garlic and parsley, oil, a few drops of lemon and a little tomato sauce.
- Appetizer alla giuliese: mixed fish with minced garlic, parsley, lemon juice, oil and salt and green sauce made with tuna, anchovies, capers, green peppers, oil and vinegar.
- Crudo di calamaretti: typical of Pescara, they are baby squid boiled in vinegar, and then seasoned with minced garlic sauce, extra virgin olive oil, lemon juice, salt and hot pepper.
- Marinara appetizer: mixed fish appetizer with squid, clams and scampi seasoned with a sauce composed of anchovies, tuna, capers, vinegar, garlic, and parsley.
- Crostini alla chietina: homemade triangular slices of bread dipped in beaten egg and fried in a pan, preferably with olive oil garnished with anchovies, capers and butter.
- Marinated anchovies: they are seasoned anchovies marinated with garlic, parsley, oregano, lemon, oil, salt, pepper.
- Pasta with scampi or paste nghe l'aragustine: typical dish of the stretch of coast between Pescara and Vasto. Adriatic scampi, tomato, garlic and parsley. A light sauce is prepared with which Spaghetti alla Chitarra or Rintrocilo are seasoned.
- Pasta alla chitarra con i pelosi: another dish of Abruzzo's seafood cuisine made with large hairy crabs (genus Pilumnus hirtellus) found on the cliffs between Pescara and Vasto. The almost disappearance of these crabs has prohibited their capture, but they can still be tasted in some restaurants on the coast (if you know the cook). The shell is browned in oil and the peeled tomatoes are poured.

=== Vegetables ===
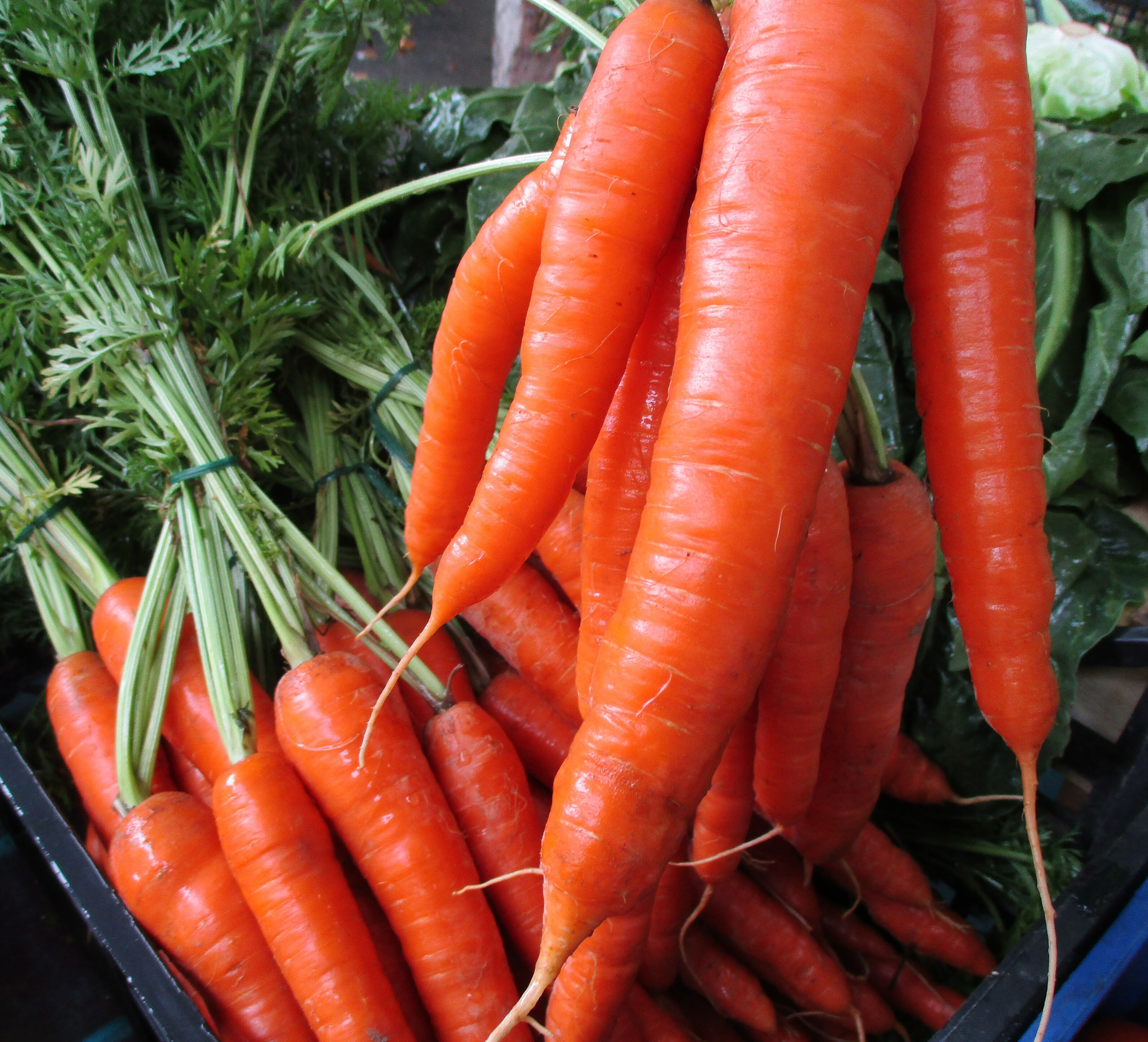
Fucino carrot

Among the vegetables and legumes of Abruzzo, the following deserve a mention:

- L'Aquila saffron, cultivated primarily in Navelli and L'Aquila
- Liquorice of Atri, primarily produced in Abruzzo
- Truffles and mushrooms, particularly wild mushrooms from the forests and hills
- Red Sulmona Garlic, typical zone red garlic
- Diavoletto d'Abruzzo, hot chili pepper, or peperoncini, regionally known as diavolilli, are very common in Abruzzese cuisine and often used to add spice or "heat" to dishes.
- Beefsteak tomato: typical tomato of Abruzzo region.
- Fucino carrot: is a carrot from Fucino Lake.

=== Breads and pizzas ===
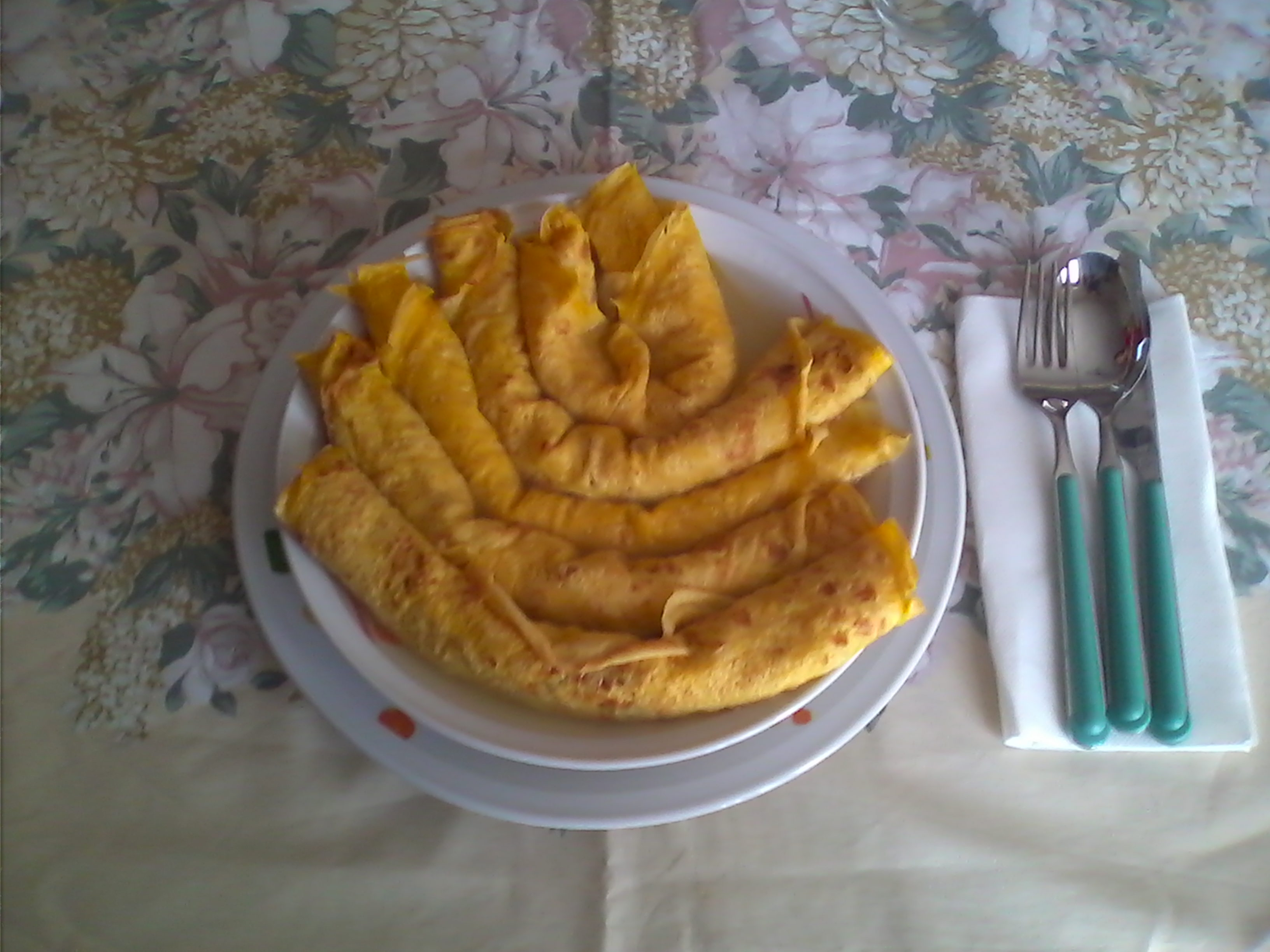
Scrippelle

- Pane di mais (lit. 'cornbread'): primarily loaves and oval, an Easter variant adds boiled potatoes, olive oil, eggs and milk.
- Bread of Senator Cappelli: primarily in the province of Chieti, it has made a comeback.
- Bread ear, named for its ear-like appearance
- Scrippelle: a rustic pancake-like dish from Teramo, similar to a French-style crêpe and served mbusse (in broth) or part of a soufflé with ragù and stuffed with chicken liver, meatballs, hard-boiled eggs, and cheese
- Pane parruozzo
- Pane casareccio aquilano
- Pane con le patate
- Pane di Solina, pagnotte di Solina
- Pane nobile di Guardiagrele
- Panonta: it is mainly composed of bread greased with bacon frying oil (as an alternative to bacon you can use pork cheek), melted lard or lard, or fried golden brown (with egg) and with cod, flamed with wine white or sometimes with vinegar (the recipe varies from town to town).

Rustic pizzas are also common:

- Pizza di Pasqua (lit. 'Easter pizza'), a rustic pizza with cheese and pepper from the Teramo area
- Pizza fritta (lit. 'fried pizza'), shallow-fried pizza
- Fiadone, from Chieti; a dough of risen eggs and cheese, baked in a thin pastry shell
- Pizza scima

=== Salumi ===
Salumi (sing.: salume) is an Italian term describing the preparation of cured meat products made predominantly from pork.

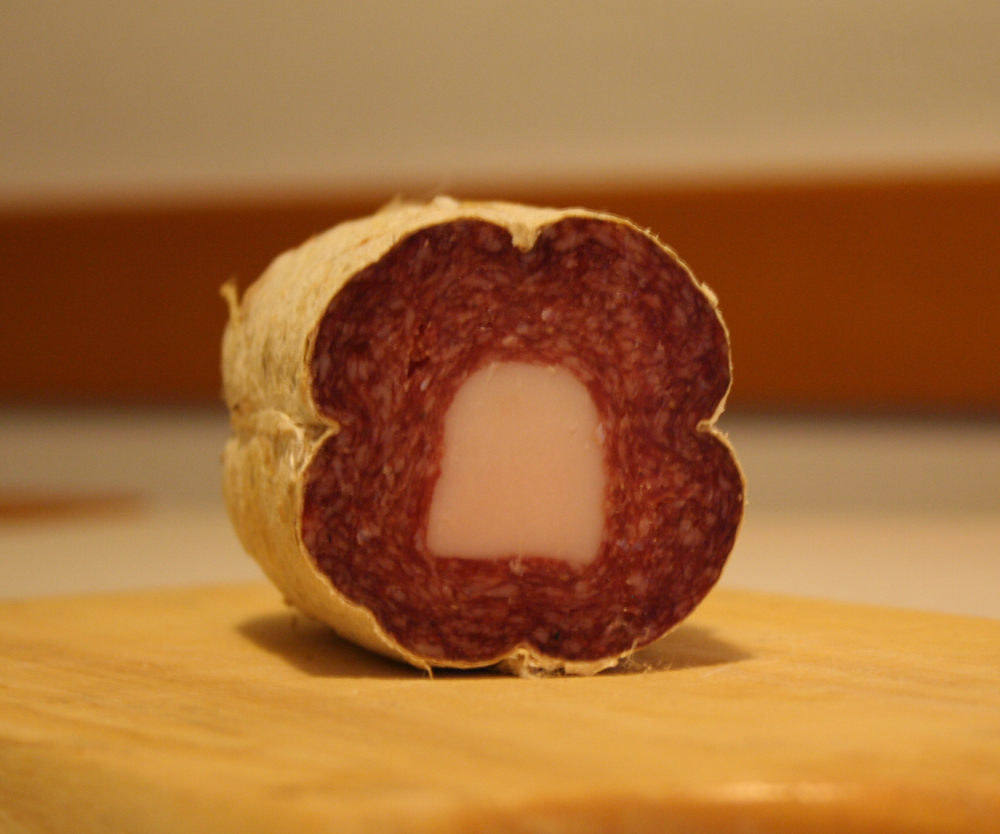
Mortadella di Campotosto

Spreadable sausage flavored with nutmeg and liver sausage with garlic and spices are hallmarks of Teramo cuisine. Ventricina from the Vasto area is made with large pieces of fat and lean pork, pressed and seasoned with powdered sweet peppers and fennel and encased in dried pig stomach.

Mortadella di Campotosto (well known in Abruzzo) is an oval, dark-red mortadella with a white column of fat and containing chili pepper. It is generally sold in pairs, tied together. Another name for the mortadella is coglioni di mulo ("donkey's balls"). It is made from shoulder and loin meat, prosciutto trimmings and fat. It is 80 percent lean meat; 25 percent is prosciutto (ham), and 20 percent is pancetta. The meat is minced and mixed with salt, pepper and white wine.

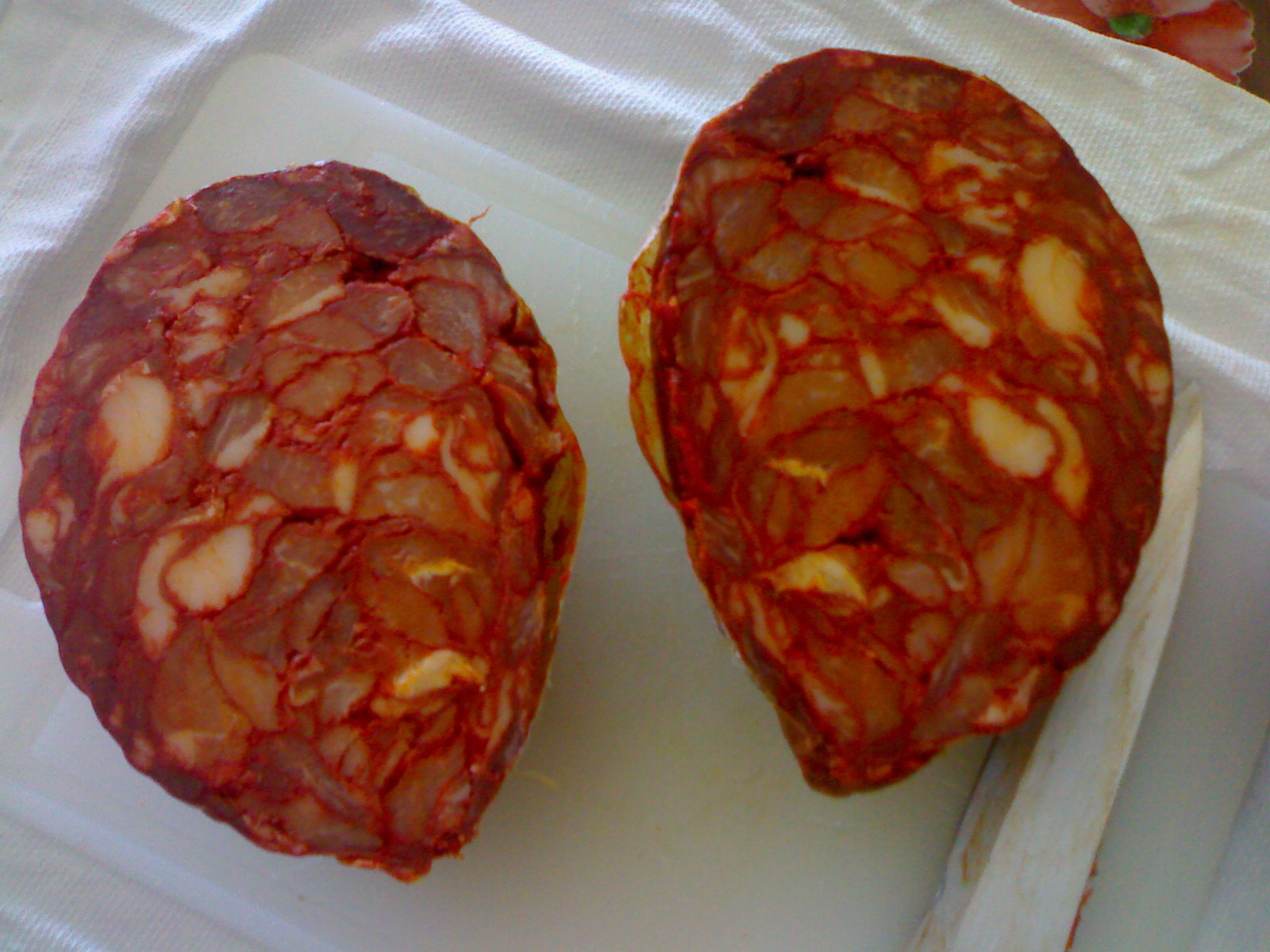
Ventricina vastese

Other salumi of this region are:

- Aquila salami
- Abruzzo salami
- Annoia
- Horseshoe-shaped liver salami in grape syrup (salamella di fegato al vino cotto)
- Teramo Nnuje salami (Nnuje teramana)
- Soppressata charcuterie
- Frentano sausage (salsicciotto frentano)
- Pennapiedimonte sausage
- Prosciuttello salami
- Cured pork (lonza)
- Cured pork head (coppa di testa)
- Pork sausage preserved in oli or lard (salsiccia di maiale sott'olio o sotto strutto)
- Teramo Ventricina charcuterie (Ventricina teramana)

=== Cheeses ===
The region's principal cheeses are:

- White cow cheese, a soft cheese made from cow's milk
- Caciocavallo abruzzese, a soft, slightly elastic dairy product made from raw, whole cow's milk with rennet and salt
- Caciofiore aquilano, made from raw whole sheep's milk, rennet, artichokes and saffron (which gives it its characteristic yellow color)
- Caciotta vaccination frentana, a half-cooked, semi-hard cheese made from raw whole cow's milk, rennet and salt
- Canestrato of Castel del Monte, a hard cheese made from raw whole sheep's milk, with rennet and salt

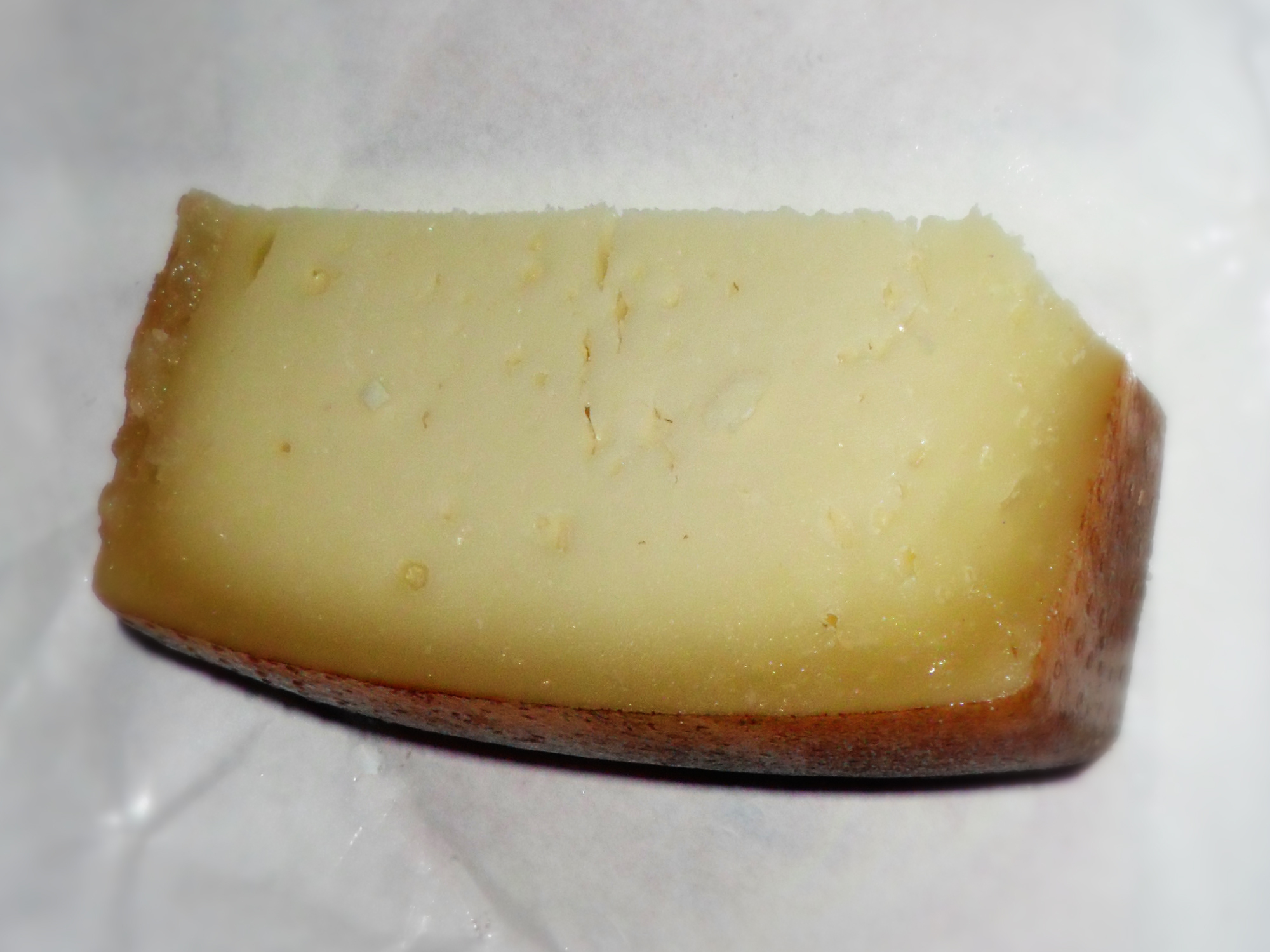
Caprino abruzzese

- Caprino abruzzese, made from raw whole goat milk (sometimes with sheep's milk), curd, and salt
- Cheese and curd stazzo, cheese and byproducts obtained from the processing of raw milk from sheep, cattle and goats
- Junket vaccination or Abruzzo sprisciocca, a soft fresh cheese made from raw whole cow's milk, rennet, and salt
- Pecorino d'Abruzzo: one of Abruzzo's flagship products—a mild, semi-hard (or hard) cheese with holes, made from raw whole sheep's milk, rennet, and salt
- Pecorino di Atri, a compact, semi-cooked cheese made from sheep's milk, rennet and salt
- Pecorino di Farindola, cheese made from sheep's milk and pork rennet (a special type of rennet, made by filling a dried pork stomach with vinegar and white wine for forty days)
- Ricotta, made from the remnants of the coagulation of raw whole sheep's milk, heated after filtration
- Scamorza d'Abruzzo, a stretched curd cheese made from cow's milk, rennet (liquid or powder) and salt

Atri and Rivisondoli are known for their cheeses. Mozzarella (fresh or seasoned) is typically made from ewe's milk; many lesser-known cheeses are found throughout Abruzzo and Molise.

=== Desserts and sweets ===
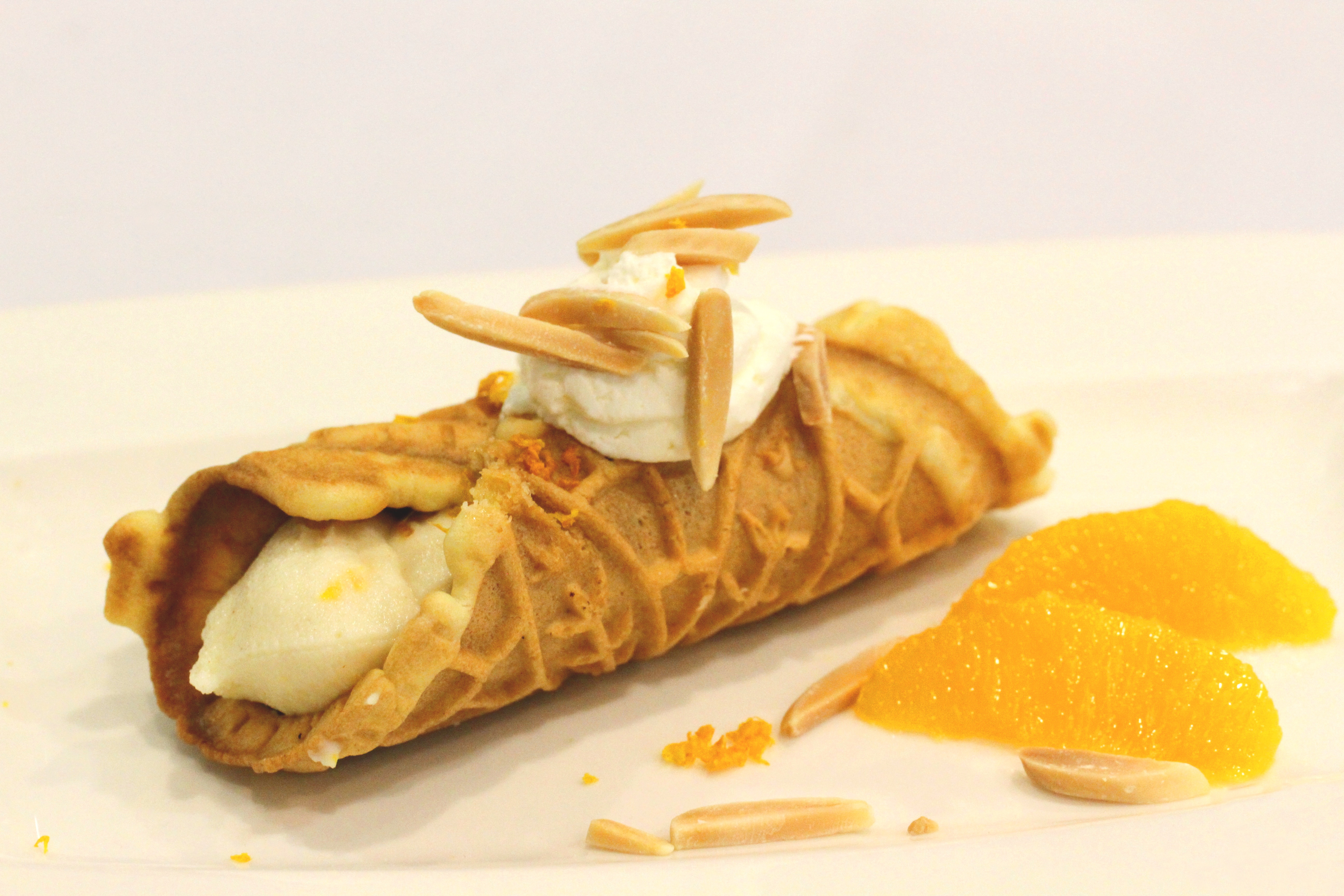
Pizzelle shaped into a cannoli and filled with an orange-almond creme

Abruzzo's sweets are well-known:

- Confetti di Sulmona: sugar-coated almonds from Sulmona
- Torrone Nurzia: chocolate nougat from L'Aquila
- Parrozzo: a cake-like treat made from crushed almonds and coated in chocolate
- Pizzelle (also known as ferratelle): a waffle cookie, often flavored with anise
- Croccante: a type of nougat made from almonds and caramelized sugar, often flavored with lemon
- Calgionetti, cagionetti, caggiunitti, caviciunette: Christmas fritters, sometimes filled with chestnuts or chickpeas and flavored with chocolate or cocoa
- Bocconotti: stuffed sweets often served for Christmas
- Zeppole di San Giuseppe: fried or baked pastries made for Saint Joseph's Day
- Sise delle monache: two layers of sponge cake filled with custard, produced in the town of Guardiagrele in the province of Chieti

=== Fruits ===
The region's principal fruits are:

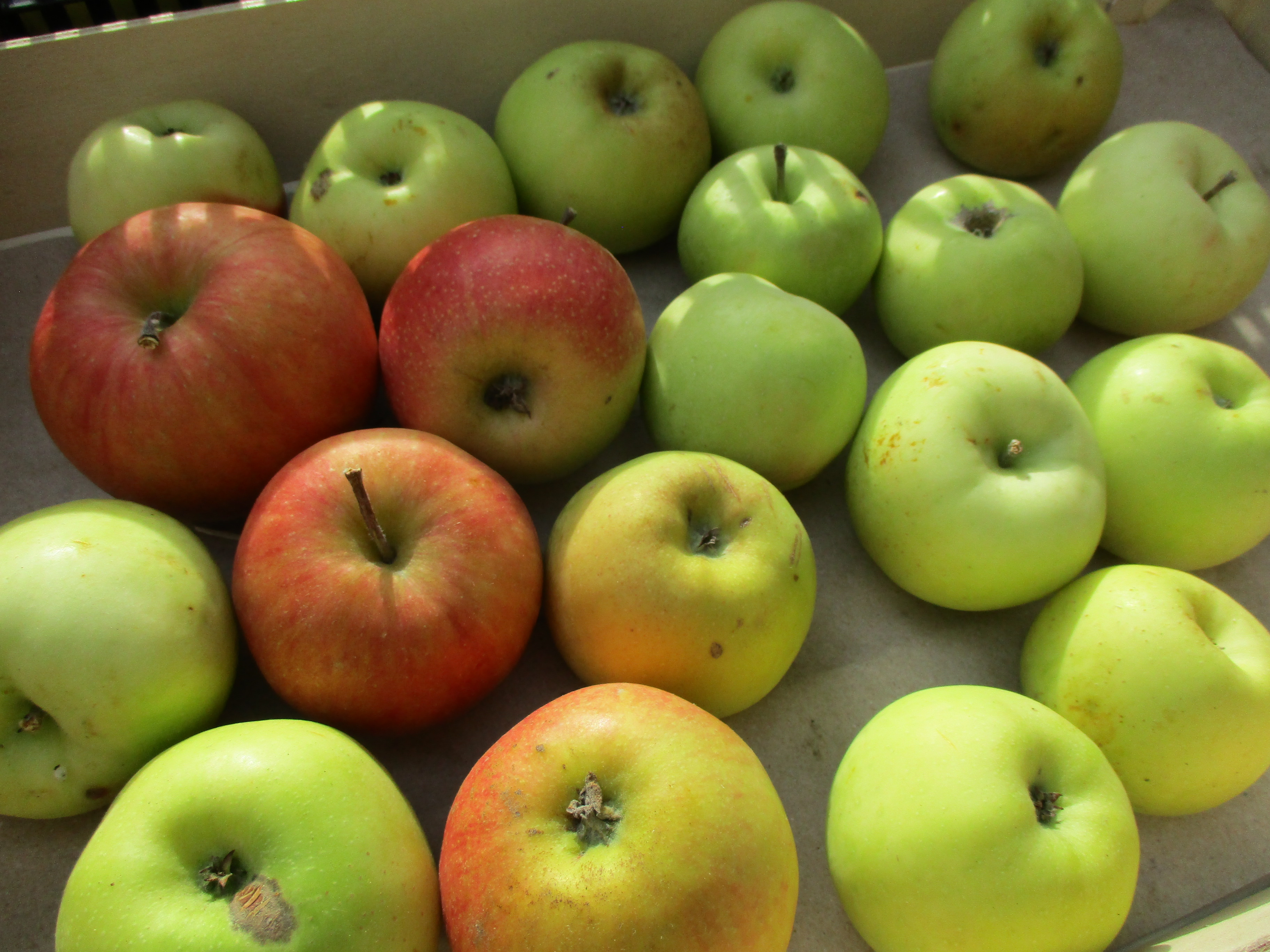
Mela della valle giovenco

- Agrumi della costa dei trabocchi: coastal citrus (particularly oranges), used for jam and limoncello
- Castagna roscetta della Valle Roveto and Marrone di Valle Castellana: types of chestnut
- Ciliege di Raiano e di Giuliano Teatino: a local cherry
- Mandorle di Navelli: almonds from the town of Navelli
- Mela della Valle Giovenco: apples from the region
- Uva di Tollo e Ortona: table grapes, also used for jam

=== Olive oil ===
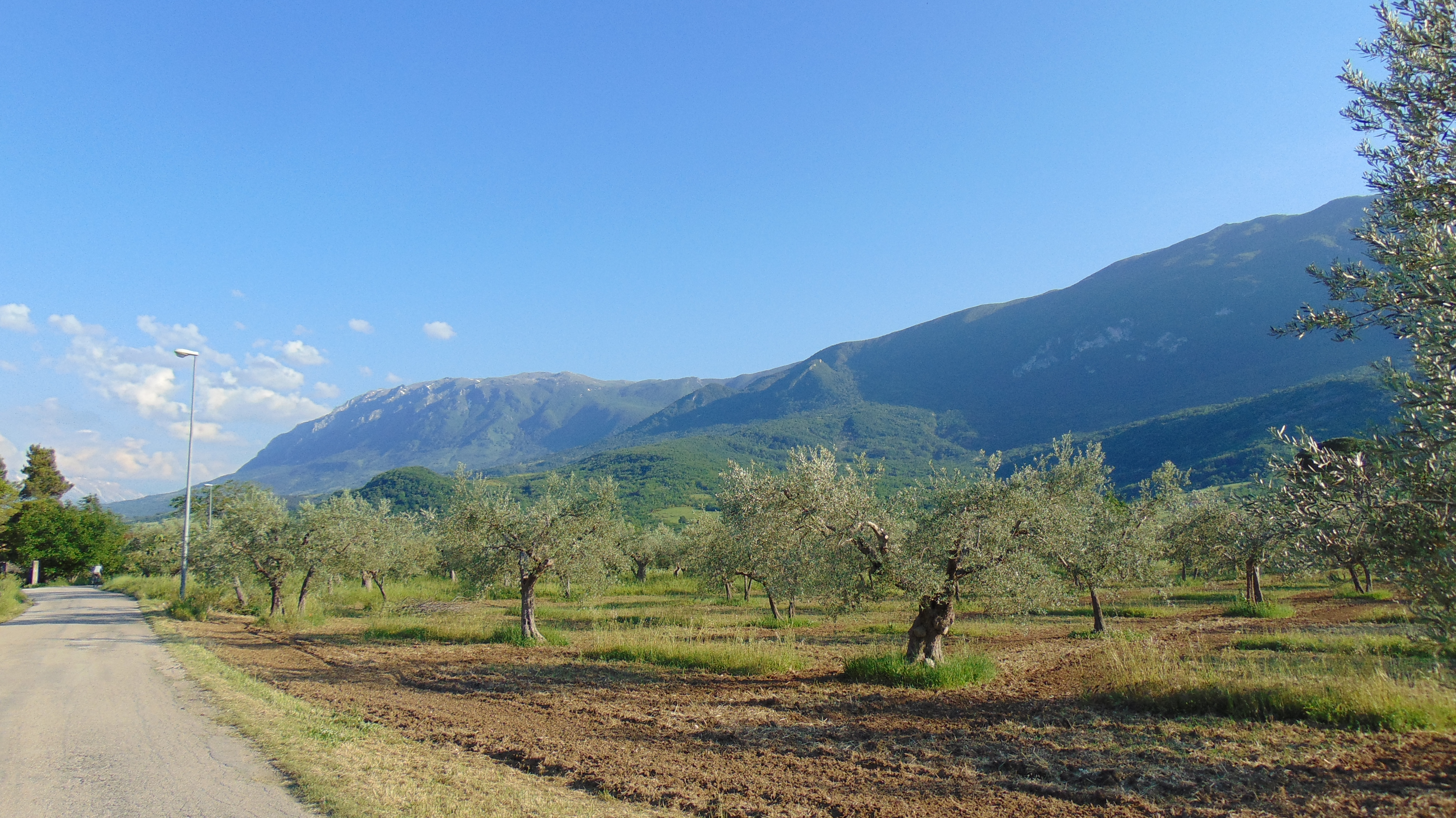
Olive trees in Tocco da Casauria

The use of oil in regional mountain and sea dishes is important; among the most common oil products we find the Aprutino Pescarese, the Pretuziano delle Colline Teramane, l'Olio extra vergine di oliva delle Valli Aquilane and Colline Teatine.

The list of Abruzzo olive cultivars:

- Castiglionese
- Dritta
- Gentile di Chieti
- Intosso
- Monicella
- Carpinetana
- Morella
- Nebbio di Chieti
- Raja
- Toccolana
- Tortiglione
- Crognalegna
- Gentile del L'Aquila (Rusticana del L'Aquila)

=== Wines and liquors ===
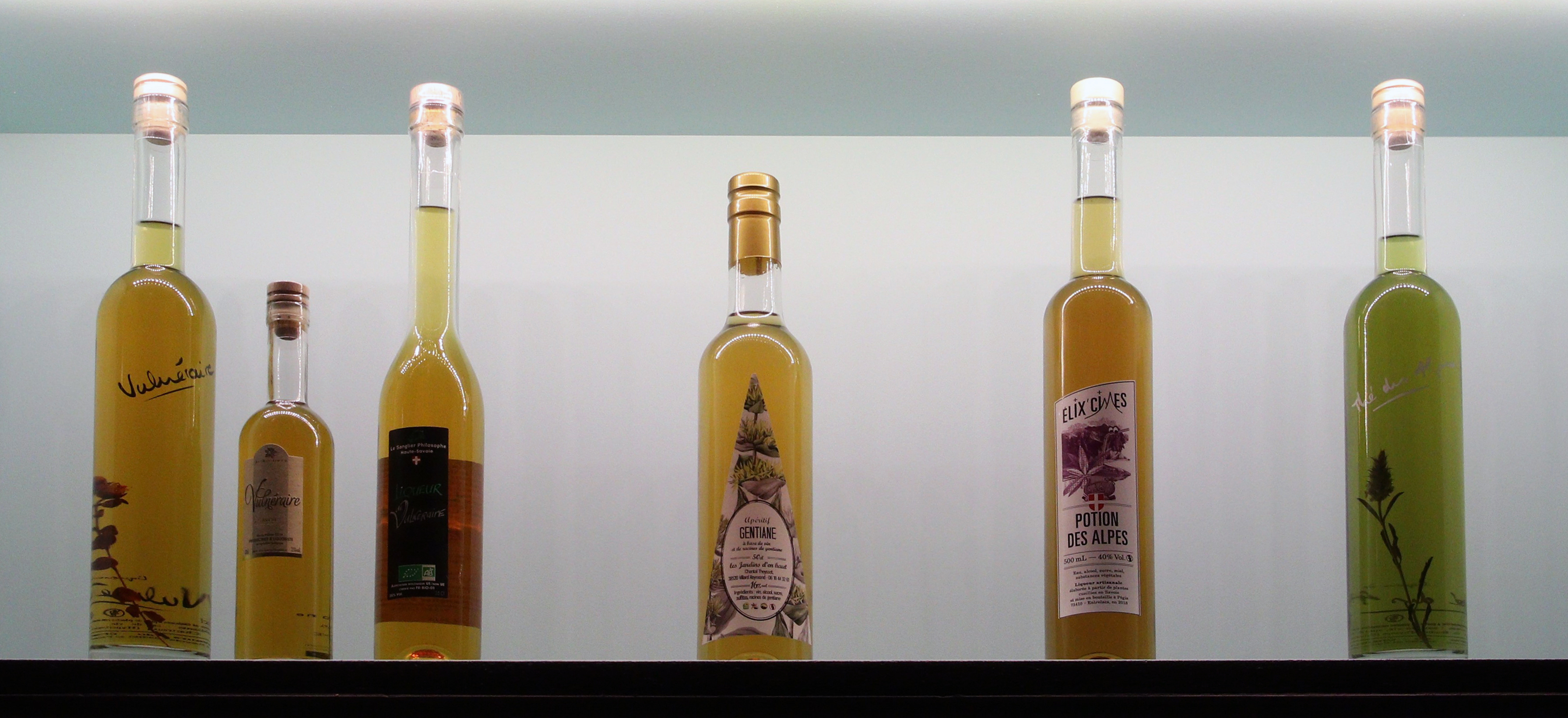
Genziana liqueur

Renowned wines like Montepulciano DOCG, Terre Tollesi DOCG, Terre di Casauria DOCG, Trebbiano d'Abruzzo DOC and Controguerra DOC are judged to be amongst the world's finest. In 2012, a bottle of Trebbiano d'Abruzzo ranked No. 1 in the top 50 Italian wine awards.

The region's principal wines are:

- Montepulciano d'Abruzzo (red)
- Cerasuolo d'Abruzzo the region's Rosé wine
- Terre Tollesi, another DOCG wine
- Terre di Casauria DOCG is a DOCG wine produced in a small area of the province of Pescara.
- Trebbiano d'Abruzzo, the region's wine white. In 2012, Trebbiano d'Abruzzo topped 50 Italian wines. Other wines are Montonico, Pecorino, Passerina, and Controguerra.

Liqueurs include:

- Genziana liqueur, a liqueur made from gentian root
- Centerba, an aromatic liqueur made from infused herbs
- Aurum, brandy-based Pescara liquor with a 40-percent alcohol content, infused with oranges
- Ratafia, black-cherry liqueur and wine (primarily Montepulciano d'Abruzzo)
- Amaro abruzzese, made of herbs, roots, and an infusion of fresh citrus fruits

IGT wines are Alto Tirino, Colli Aprutini, Colli del Sangro, Colline Frentane, Colline Pescaresi, Colline Teatine, Del Vastese (or Histonium), Terre di Chieti, and Valle Peligna.

== See also ==
- Italian cuisine
- Apulian cuisine
- Arbëreshë cuisine
- Emilian cuisine
- Cuisine of Liguria
- Lombard cuisine
- Cuisine of Mantua
- Cuisine of Basilicata
- Neapolitan cuisine
- Piedmontese cuisine
- Roman cuisine
- Cuisine of Sardinia
- Sicilian cuisine
- Tuscan cuisine
- Venetian cuisine

== Bibliography ==
- Piras, Claudia; Medagliani, Eugenio (2000). Culinaria Italy. Könemann Verlagsgesellschaft mbh. ISBN 3-8290-2901-2.
- Teresa, Anna. "Food and Memories of Abruzzo: Italy's Pastoral Land" (Wiley, 2004)
