= Gentian liqueur =

Alcoholic drink

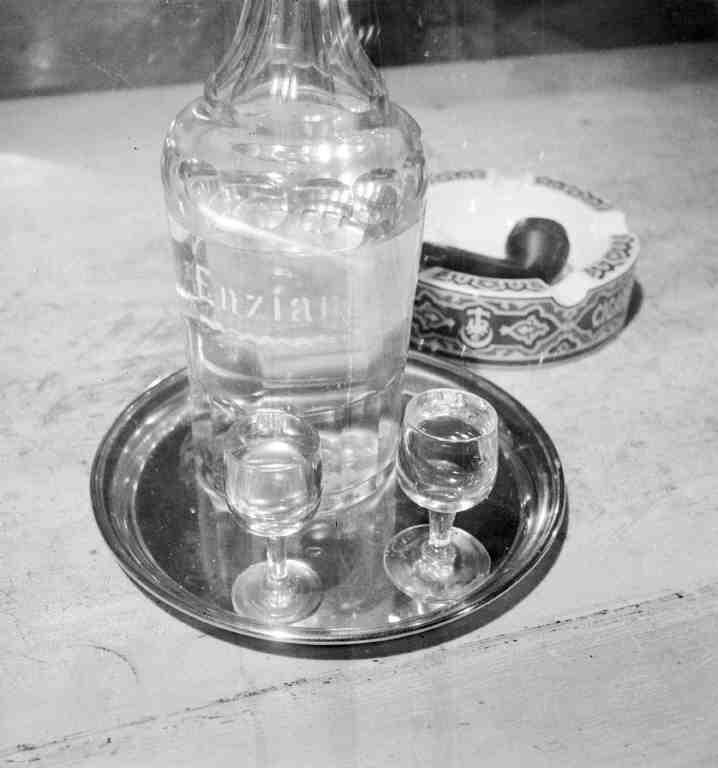
Gentian schnapps in a glass bottle

Gentian liqueur (also known as Enzian, Gentian schnapps, or simply Gentian) is a clear liqueur produced using the roots of the gentian plant.

It is typical of several regions of Italy, but especially Trentino and Alto Adige, as well as of parts of France, where it is called liqueur de gentiane, which is produced by distilling a maceration of the roots of the gentian.

The name genziana is also used for a digestif, typical of the Abruzzo region, in central Italy. It is also made with the roots of the gentian, but by steeping them in white wine, with no distillation.

== Production ==
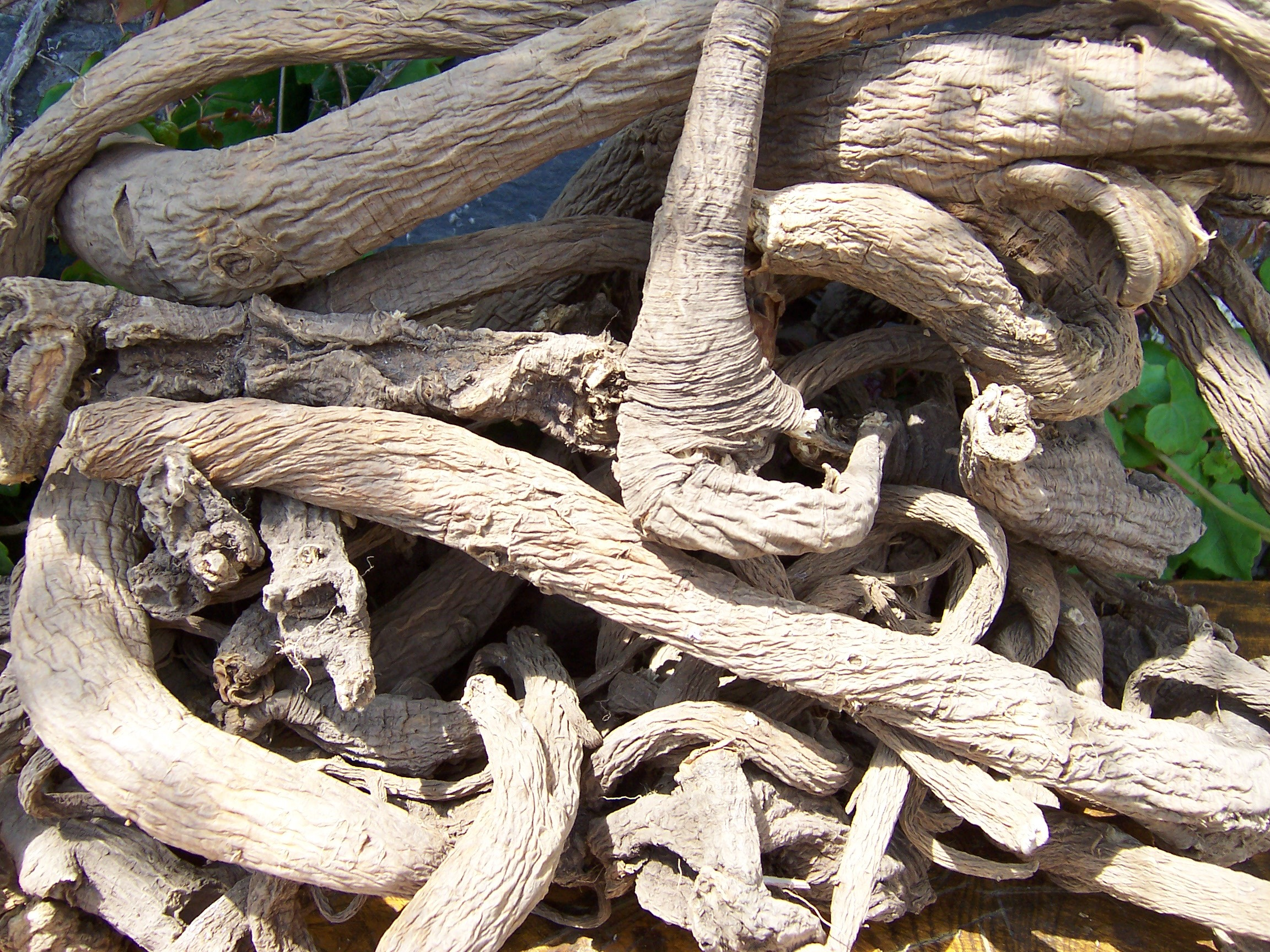
Dried gentian roots, which are used in production

Gentian liqueur is produced from the maceration of the root of the gentian plant in alcohol, followed by distillation. Additional ingredients, such as other herbs and botanicals, are typically added after distillation. The resulting liqueur can be sweetened with the addition of sugar.

Yellow gentian (Gentiana lutea), one species in the genus Gentiana, is most commonly used. Less commonly, the roots from other species of Gentiana are used, such as the purple gentian, Hungarian gentian, or spotted gentian.

In Europe, the harvesting of gentian root from the wild is strictly controlled; as a result, most gentian used for production of the spirit are cultivated for the purpose.

== Properties ==
The taste of gentian liqueur has an element of bitterness that comes from the gentian root, of which the primary characteristics are "a dusty earthiness, dry floral notes, and vegetal character", according to Jérôme Corneille, production director of Salers gentian aperitif. The taste is also described as "grassy and vegetal; not horribly bitter", but having a "signature tangy aspect".

Its alcohol content by volume typically ranges from 15 to 20 percent.

Its color ranges from colorless or pale straw, to a bright, clear yellow.

== History ==
Gentian liqueur origins are disputed, with the first mentions of production being from the 1600's in Bavaria, Germany. In Germany, the liqueur is referred to as "Enzian" (the German word for 'gentian'). Enzianbrennerei Grassl in Berchtesgaden, Bavaria has produced distilled gentian liquors since 1692, and is Germany's oldest gentian distillery. However, it was popularized in the French Alps, in the modern-day Auvergne-Rhône-Alpes region. Mentions of "gentian" as an alcoholic beverage first appeared in writing in this region around the late 18th century, but gentian liqueurs did not rise to prominence until the late 19th century, after the invention of the continuous still allowed for the creation of neutral spirits, into which botanicals such as gentian could be infused. These liqueurs were first sold as medicinal bitter tonics, but gained popularity as aperitifs.

== As a spirit ==
"Gentian" can refer to a specific type of spirit made by the distillation of a fermentation product of gentian roots (with or without added neutral spirits), with no other added flavors. As a pure distillation product, this form of gentian is classified as a spirit. The EU regulates its alcoholic strength, specifying it must comprise at least 37.5 percent alcohol by volume.

== See also ==
- Genziana liqueur
- Angostura bitters – which contain gentian
- Suze – a French brand of bitters apéritif flavored with gentian
