= Mazzarelle =

Italian lamb dish

- Place of origin: Italy
- Region or state: Abruzzo
- Main ingredients: Lamb

Mazzarelle are rolls of lamb offal wrapped in endive leaves tied with casings of the same lamb, typical of the Abruzzo tradition, widespread in the mountains, particularly in the Teramo area. They are a prodotto agroalimentare tradizionale (PAT) by the Ministry of Agricultural, Food and Forestry Policies.

== See also ==
- Cuisine of Abruzzo
- List of lamb dishes
- Arrosticini
