= Cozze allo zafferano =

Italian dish

- Place of origin: Italy
- Region or state: Abruzzo
- Main ingredients: Mussels, L'Aquila saffron

Cozze allo zafferano is a traditional dish from Abruzzo, Italy. It is made with classic cooked mussels prepared with parsley, onion, bay leaf, white wine, and olive oil and seasoned with L'Aquila saffron sauce.

Although saffron is cultivated in Abruzzo, it is not a typical ingredient in the cuisine; this dish is "one of the rare examples", according to Anna Theresa Callen.

== See also ==
- Cuisine of Abruzzo
- List of fish dishes
