= Baccalà all'abruzzese =

Italian dish

- Course: Secondo (Italian course)
- Place of origin: Italy
- Region or state: Abruzzo
- Main ingredients: Baccalà, potatoes, tomatoes, oil, garlic, parsley, onion, red pepper, salt, black olives

Baccalà all'abruzzese is a traditional Abruzzo dish made with baccalà, potatoes, tomatoes, oil, garlic, parsley, onion, red pepper, salt and black olives.

== See also ==
- Cuisine of Abruzzo
- List of fish dishes
