= Brudet =

Fish stew from Croatia

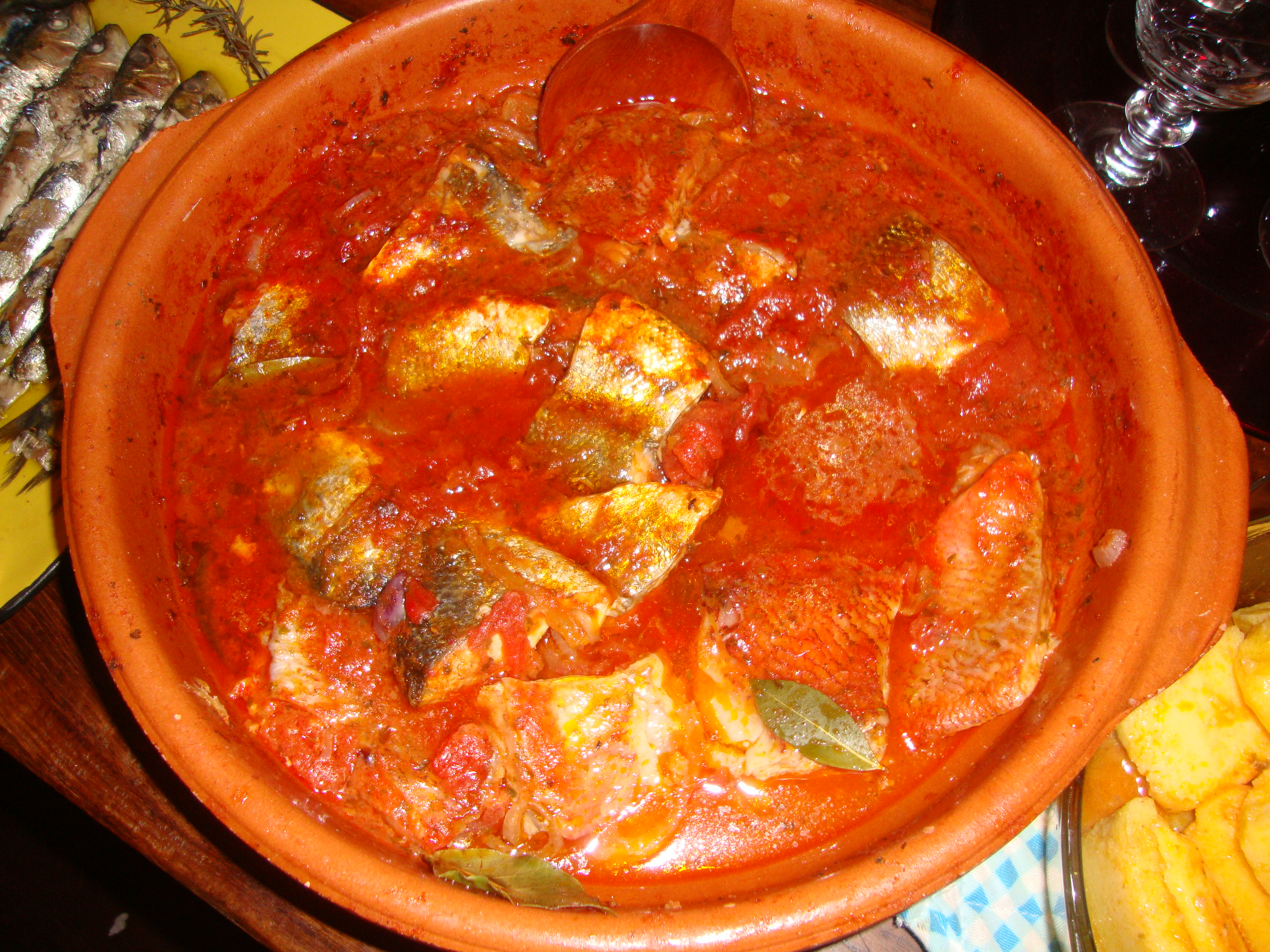
- Alternative names: Brodet, brodetto
- Type: Stew
- Course: Main
- Region or state: Dalmatia; Kvarner Gulf; Istria; Montenegrin Littoral; Italian coast of Adriatic Sea
- Main ingredients: Fish

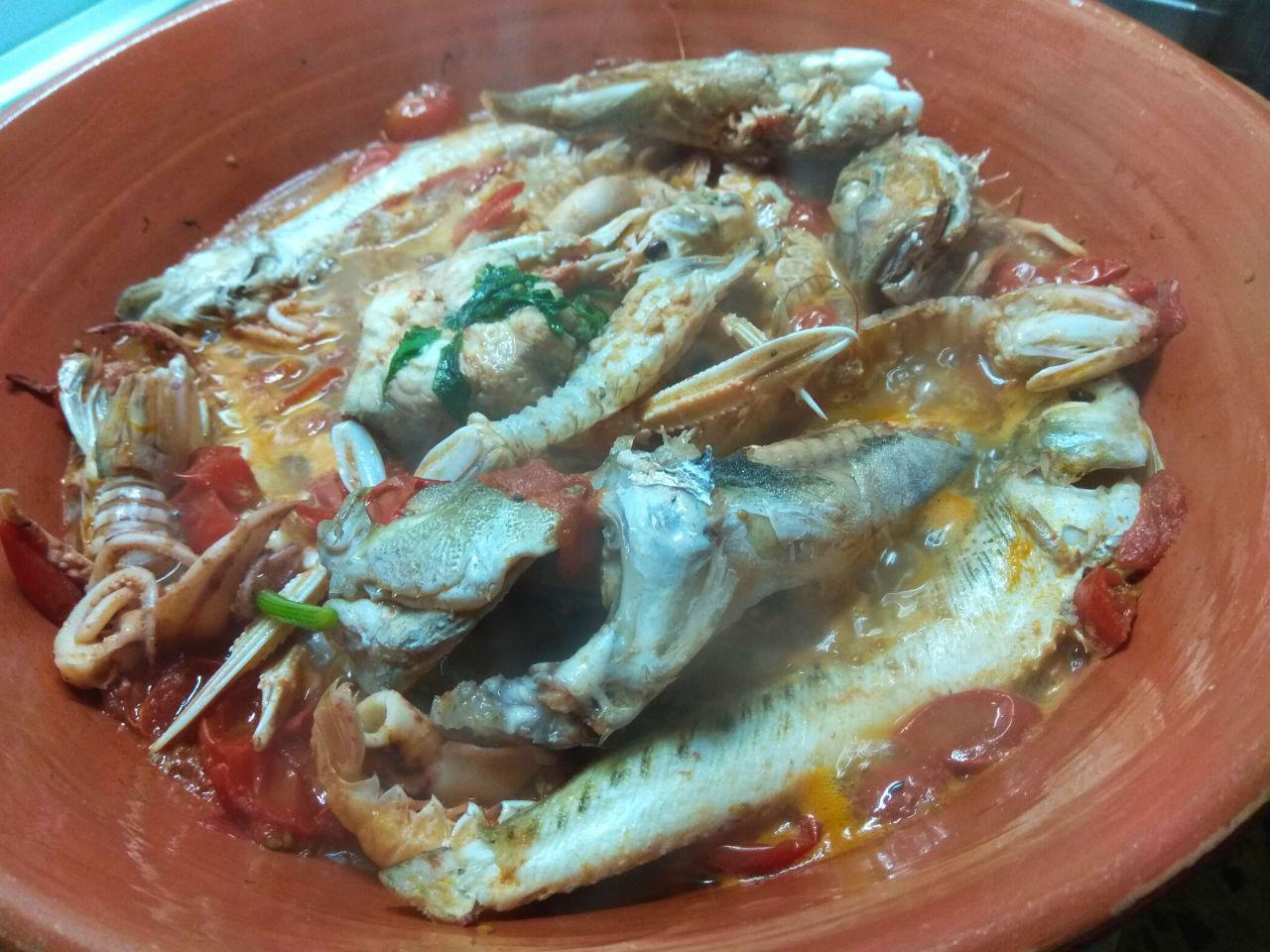
Brodetto alla vastese, from Vasto, Abruzzo, Italy

Brudet or brodet is a fish stew made in the Croatian regions of Dalmatia, Kvarner, and Istria, as well as along the coast of Montenegro. Brodetto di pesce, or simply brodetto (broeto in Venetian language, brudèt in Romagnol dialect, el brudèt in Fanese, el brudettu in Portorecanatese, lu vrëdètte in Sambenedettese, lu vredòtte in Giulianova dialect, u' Bredette in Termolese, lu vrudàtte in Vastese dialect), is the signature dish of almost all Italian Adriatic coastal cities (famous are fish stews from Venetian Lagoon, Romagna, Marche, Abruzzo, and Molise). It consists of several types of fish stewed with spices, vegetables, and red or white wine, or even vinegar. The most important aspect of brodetto is its simplicity of preparation and the fact that it is typically prepared in a single pot. It is usually served with polenta or toasted bread, which soaks up the fish broth, while other recipes serve it with potatoes or bread. Brodetto can significantly vary in style, composition, and flavour, depending upon the types of ingredients and cooking styles used.

== Similar dishes ==
A similar dish from Corfu is known as bourdeto. The name derives from the Venetian word brodetto, reflecting the island's centuries of Venetian rule, during which the dish was adapted into local Greek cuisine with the addition of paprika and hot red pepper.

== See also ==
Media related to Brodetto at Wikimedia Commons

- List of stews
