= Bourdeto =

Fish dish from Corfu

- Alternative names: Μπουρδέτο, Μπουργέτο
- Place of origin: Greece
- Region or state: Corfu
- Main ingredients: Fish
- Ingredients generally used: Red pepper
- Variations: Brudet

Bourdeto (Greek: Μπουρδέτο) is a fish dish from Corfu. It comes from the Venetian word brodetto, which means 'broth'. It is fish cooked with onion, and red sweet and hot spicy pepper. The best fish for bourdeto is scorpion fish. One can also find the same dish containing fillet of a bigger kind of fish. In Patras and Western Greece, the dish is also called "bourgeto"/"bourjeto". In Zakynthos meat is used, instead of fish.

== See also ==
- Brudet
