= Torrone Nurzia =

Type of nougat from Abruzzo, Italy

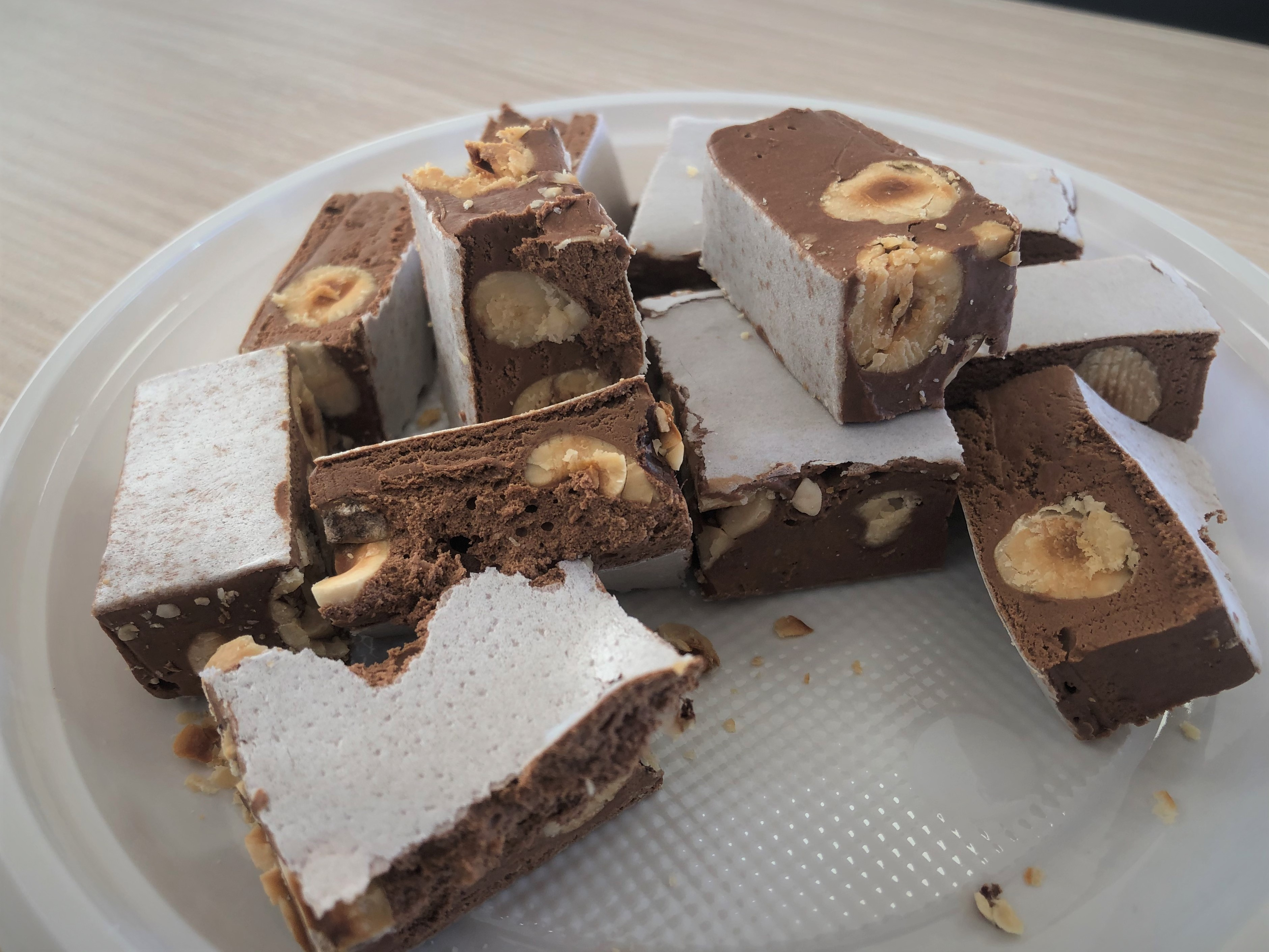
Torrone Nurzia

Torrone Nurzia, also called torrone tenero al cioccolato aquilano, is a type of nougat originating in the Abruzzo region of Italy. Conceived by pastry chef Ulisse Nurzia and produced in L'Aquila since the 19th century, it is considered an Italian excellence and is listed as a prodotto agroalimentare tradizionale (PAT) by the Ministry of Agricultural, Food and Forestry Policies.

== See also ==
- Cuisine of Abruzzo
- List of Italian desserts and pastries
- Torrone
