= Liquorice of Atri =

Italian agri-food product

The Licorice of Atri is an Italian agri-food product grown in Atri in Abruzzo with licorice fresh or dried and its extract.

== History ==
Licorice of Atri has been cultivated in Abruzzo since Roman times, and in the Middle Ages the friars already used it by extracting the juice; the region Abruzzo is after Calabria for licorice production. Famous in Italy are the licorice trunks of the candy Tabù produced by the company R. De Rosa founded in 1836 in Atri in Abruzzo.

== Production ==
Atri's licorice is marketed in the following forms:

- wheel
- sticks
- minnows
- filled sugared almonds
- candy

== See also ==
- Cuisine of Abruzzo
