= Scapece alla vastese =

Italian dish

- Place of origin: Italy
- Region or state: Abruzzo
- Main ingredients: Escabeche, saffron

Scapece alla vastese is a traditional dish from the Abruzzo region of Italy. In its preparation mackerel and oily fish are used; then, once fried, the fish is immersed in vinegar and saffron which gives it the intense yellow color that characterizes it.

== See also ==
- Cuisine of Abruzzo
- List of fish dishes
