= Pecora alla callara =

Italian skewered lamb dish

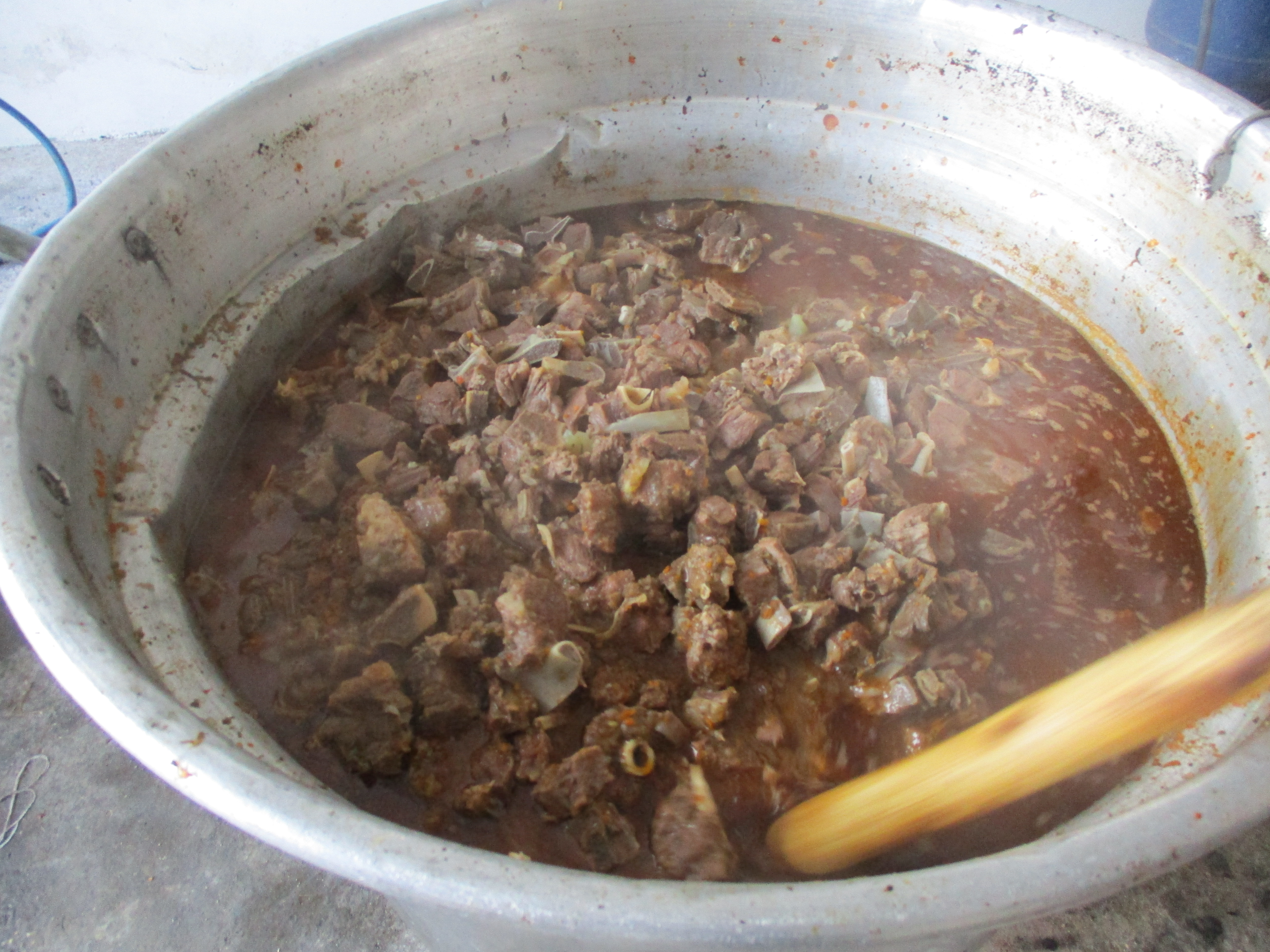
- Course: Secondo (Italian course)
- Place of origin: Italy
- Region or state: Abruzzo
- Main ingredients: Lamb

Pecora alla callara (in the Teramo area), pecora alla cottora, pecora cutturo (in the L'Aquila area) or pecora ajo cotturo (in the Marsican area) is an ancient lamb recipe typical of the Abruzzo tradition, widespread above all in the mountains, particularly in the Marsican area, in the L'Aquila basin, and in the Monti della Laga area.

Being a poor and typical dish of the mountains and open places, during cooking various aromatic herbs are added that the shepherds had at their disposal – thyme, laurel, rosemary, onion, garlic, carrot, celery, juniper berries, pepper, and chilli pepper. It is cooked from four to six hours.

== See also ==
Media related to Pecora alla cottora at Wikimedia Commons

- Cuisine of Abruzzo
- List of lamb dishes
