= Coregone di Campotosto =

Traditional Italian fish dish

- Place of origin: Italy
- Region or state: Abruzzo
- Main ingredients: Coregonus lavaretus, oil, chilli pepper

Coregone di Campotosto is a traditional fish dish from the Abruzzo region of Italy, typical of Lake Campotosto, this fish of subalpine origin that has found an ideal habitat in this lake. Thanks also to the very clean waters and selected nutrients, the quality of the whitefish meat is excellent and lends itself very well to the different ways of preparation. The fish is cooked roasted on the grill and then marinated in a preparation of vinegar and with oil and chilli pepper.

== See also ==
- Cuisine of Abruzzo
- List of fish dishes
- Campotosto
