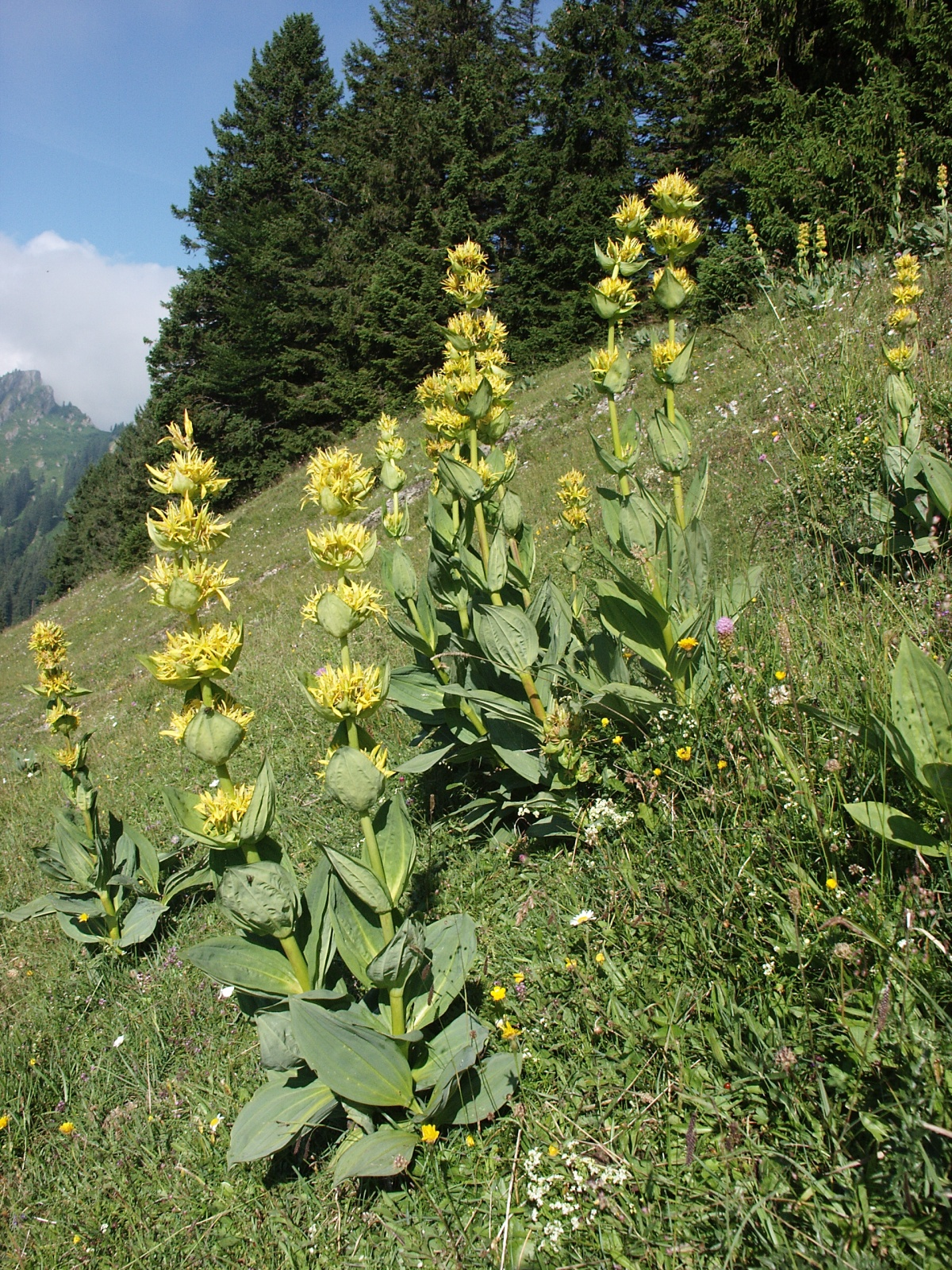
- Gentiana lutea in the Allgäuer Alpen, Germany

Conservation status
- Least Concern (IUCN 3.1)

Scientific classification
- Kingdom: Plantae
- Clade: Tracheophytes
- Clade: Angiosperms
- Clade: Eudicots
- Clade: Asterids
- Order: Gentianales
- Family: Gentianaceae
- Genus: Gentiana
- Species: G. lutea

Binomial name
- Gentiana lutea L.

= Gentiana lutea =

Species of plant

Gentiana lutea, the great yellow gentian, is a species of gentian native to the mountains of central and southern Europe, including the Alps, the Carpathians (where scarce), the Pyrenees, the Apennines, and the mountains of the Balkan Peninsula. It is the type species of the genus Gentiana.

== Description ==
Gentiana lutea is a herbaceous perennial plant, growing to 1–2 m (3.3–6.6 ft) tall, with broad lanceolate to elliptic glabrous leaves 10–30 cm (4–12 in) long and 4–15 cm (2–6 in) broad, borne in opposite pairs. The flowers are yellow, 18–24 mm long, with the corolla separated nearly to the base into 5–7 narrow petals; they are produced in whorls of 3–10 together on the upper part of the stem. Flowering is from June to August. It grows in grassy alpine and sub-alpine pastures, usually on calcareous soils, at altitudes of up to 2500 m.

== Uses ==
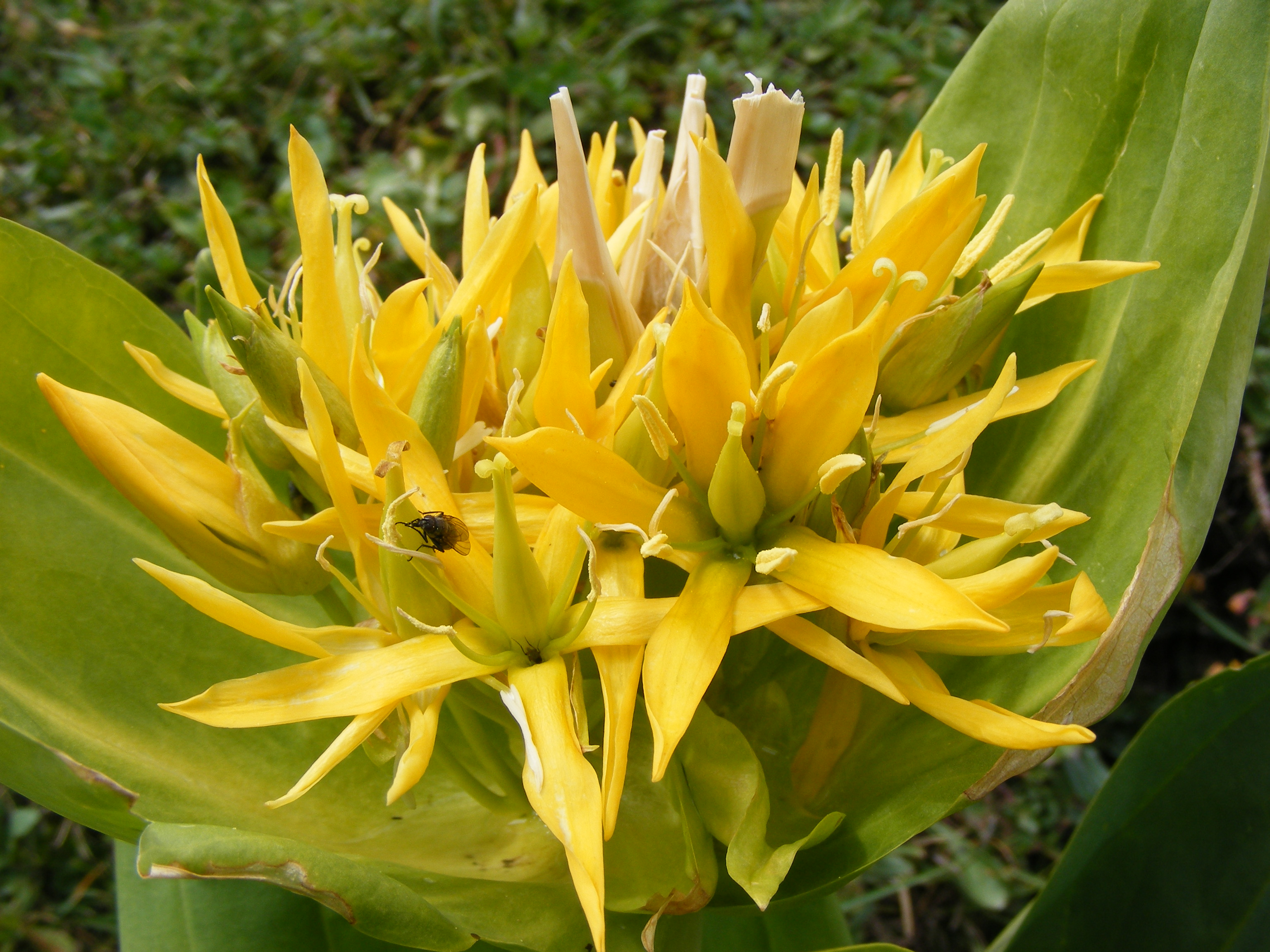
Close-up of the flowers; Salvan, Switzerland

Gentiana lutea is remarkable for the intense bitterness of the root and every part of the herbage. Gentian was used occasionally in brewing.

Gentian root has a long history of use as a herbal bitter and is an ingredient of many proprietary medicines. The parts used include the dried, underground parts of the plant. The root is long and thick, usually about 30 cm (12 in) long and 2.5 cm (1 in) diameter, but sometimes 90 cm or more long and 5 cm in diameter, yellowish-brown in colour and very bitter in taste. The rhizome and roots are collected in autumn and dried. Caution should be exercised as to its use because it is endangered in some regions, although the species as a whole is not threatened. The related species Centaurium erythraea shares many of its constituents and actions.

The name is a tribute to Gentius, an Illyrian king who was thought to have found out that the herb had tonic properties.

In veterinary pharmacopeia in the 1860s, gentian root or gentian radix was considered useful as a stomachic.

Extracts of gentian root can be found in several liqueurs. It is used in France to produce a number of bitter liqueurs (genziana liqueurs), including Salers in the Cantal, and a Limousin specialty liqueur and aperitif called Avèze. The plants are now cultivated in the Auvergne area in view of their protected status, and they are no longer harvested from the wild in the Auvergne mountains.

The European Gentian Association in Lausanne has the objective to develop the knowledge and uses of yellow gentian and other species of Gentianaceae.

Gentiana lutea is depicted on the reverse of the Albanian 2000 lek banknote, issued in 2008. The note depicts King Gentius on its obverse.

=== Chemical constituents ===
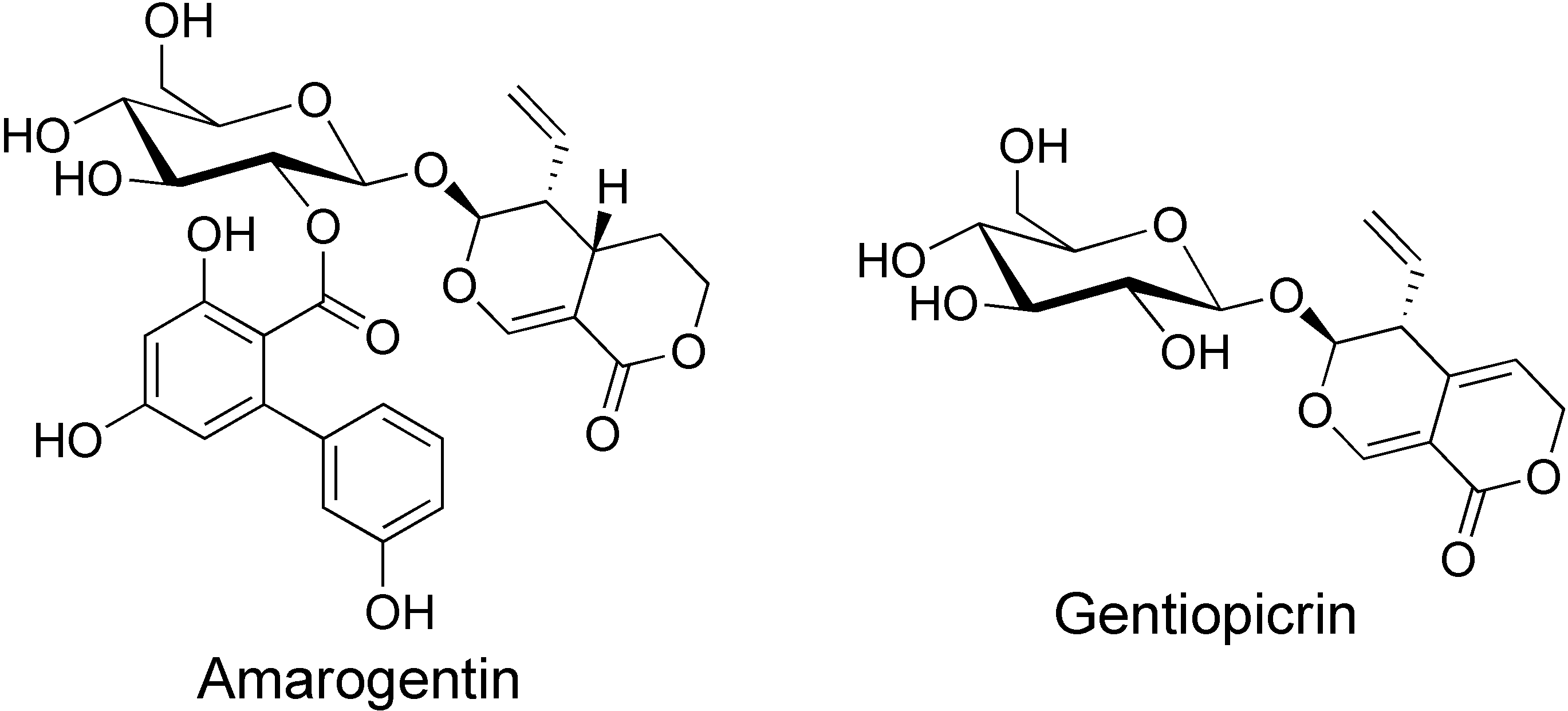
Amarogentin and gentiopicrin, the bitter glycosides from gentian root

The bitter principles of gentian root are secoiridoid glycosides amarogentin and gentiopicrin. The former is one of the most bitter natural compounds known and is used as a scientific basis for measuring bitterness.
