= Arrosticini =

Italian skewered lamb dish

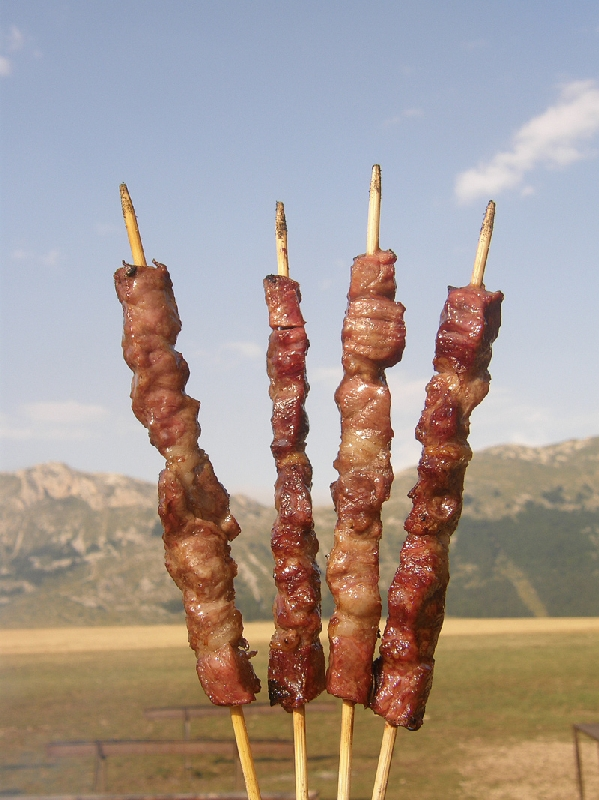
- Type: Snack, street food
- Course: Secondo (Italian course)
- Place of origin: Italy
- Region or state: Abruzzo
- Main ingredients: Mutton or lamb

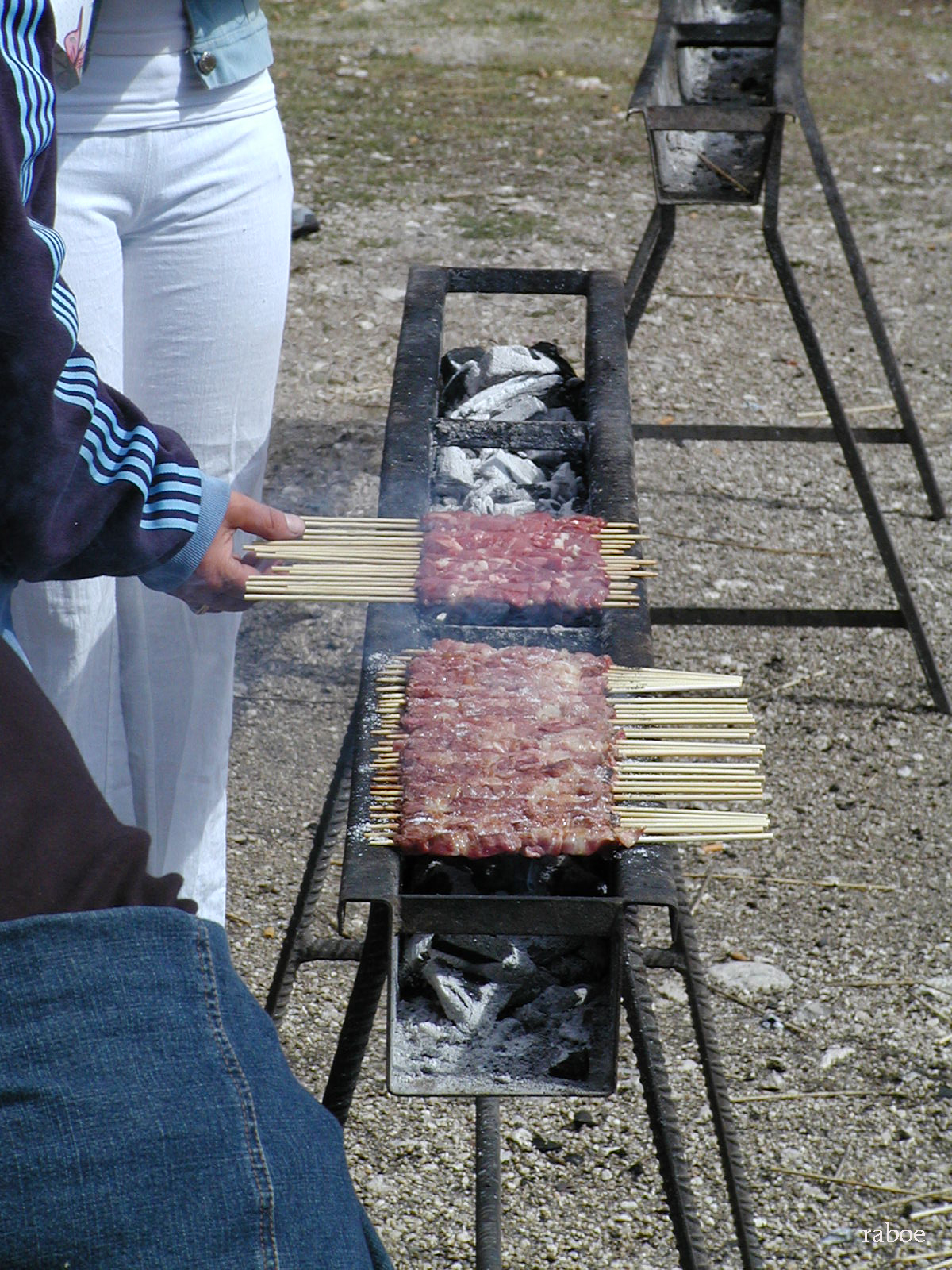
Arrosticini being cooked on a furnacella

Arrosticini is a class of traditional dishes of skewered grilled meat characteristic of Abruzzo cuisine. They are typically made from mutton or lamb cut in chunks and pierced by a skewer. Arrosticini are cooked on a brazier with a typically elongated shape, called furnacella, which resembles a gutter. It is listed as a prodotto agroalimentare tradizionale (PAT) by the Italian Ministry of Agricultural, Food and Forestry Policies.

They are part of the local shepherding tradition, as it entails the consumption of mutton or sheep meat. Although their preparation became widespread throughout the region, they are originally from the area located south-east of the Gran Sasso d'Italia mountain between the provinces of L'Aquila, Teramo, and Pescara.

== History ==
Arrosticini belong to the culinary tradition of settled pastoralism and transhumance, a practice that was very common in the region of Abruzzo until the beginning of agricultural mechanisation in the 20th century. Legend has it that the dish was invented in 1830 by two shepherds who, trying to minimise food waste, cut up sheep meat into small pieces, making sure to also get the meat around the bones. They then stacked them on skewers made with sticks from local plants and cooked them on a brazier. Although this cooking method was meant to make meat scraps more appetising, it soon became used for other cuts of meat.

== See also ==
Media related to Arrosticini at Wikimedia Commons

- List of lamb dishes
- Chuan (food)
