= Genziana liqueur =

Liqueur from Italy

Genziana
- Type: Amaro
- Origin: Italy
- Alcohol by volume: ~30%

Genziana liqueur (Italian: liquore di genziana), or simply genziana, is a liqueur typical of several regions of Italy, especially Abruzzo (as well as of parts of France, where it is called liqueur de gentiane), which is produced by distilling a maceration of the roots of the Gentiana (Gentiana lutea).

The name genziana is also used for a digestif, typical of the Abruzzo region of Italy. It is also produced from the roots of the gentian but by steeping them in white wine rather than by any process involving distillation.

== See also ==
- Gentian liqueur
