= Diavoletto d'Abruzzo =

Variety of chili pepper

- Species: Capsicum annuum
- Origin: Italy, Abruzzo
- Heat: Medium
- Scoville scale: 10000 SHU

The Diavoletto d'Abruzzo or lazzaretto abruzzese is a variety of chili recognized among the Traditional agri-food products of Italy, in particular region Abruzzo.

== History ==
It was probably imported by Christopher Columbus from his return shipments around 1514.

== Description ==
It belongs to the Solanaceae family, and the fruit of the plant has an elongated shape, small or medium-small in size, with variable coloring and with the well-defined organoleptic qualities of spicy acrid.

== Cultivation ==
Growing is very easy: it loves warm temperatures and survives well even in winter if properly maintained in a heated greenhouse. It can be germinated around March or April, preferably using the Scottex method, and then brought outdoors once temperatures stabilize. It requires a very large pot or, if planted in the ground, plenty of space between plants to allow the roots to expand and make it sufficiently resistant. Regular watering is recommended, and the soil doesn't require much nutrients. To prevent pest infestation, it's recommended to plant it alongside tomato or sweet pepper plants.

== Use ==
In Abruzzo cuisine it is used in both land and sea dishes, and is also preserved in oil.

== See also ==
- List of Capsicum cultivars
