= Red Sulmona Garlic =

Type of garlic

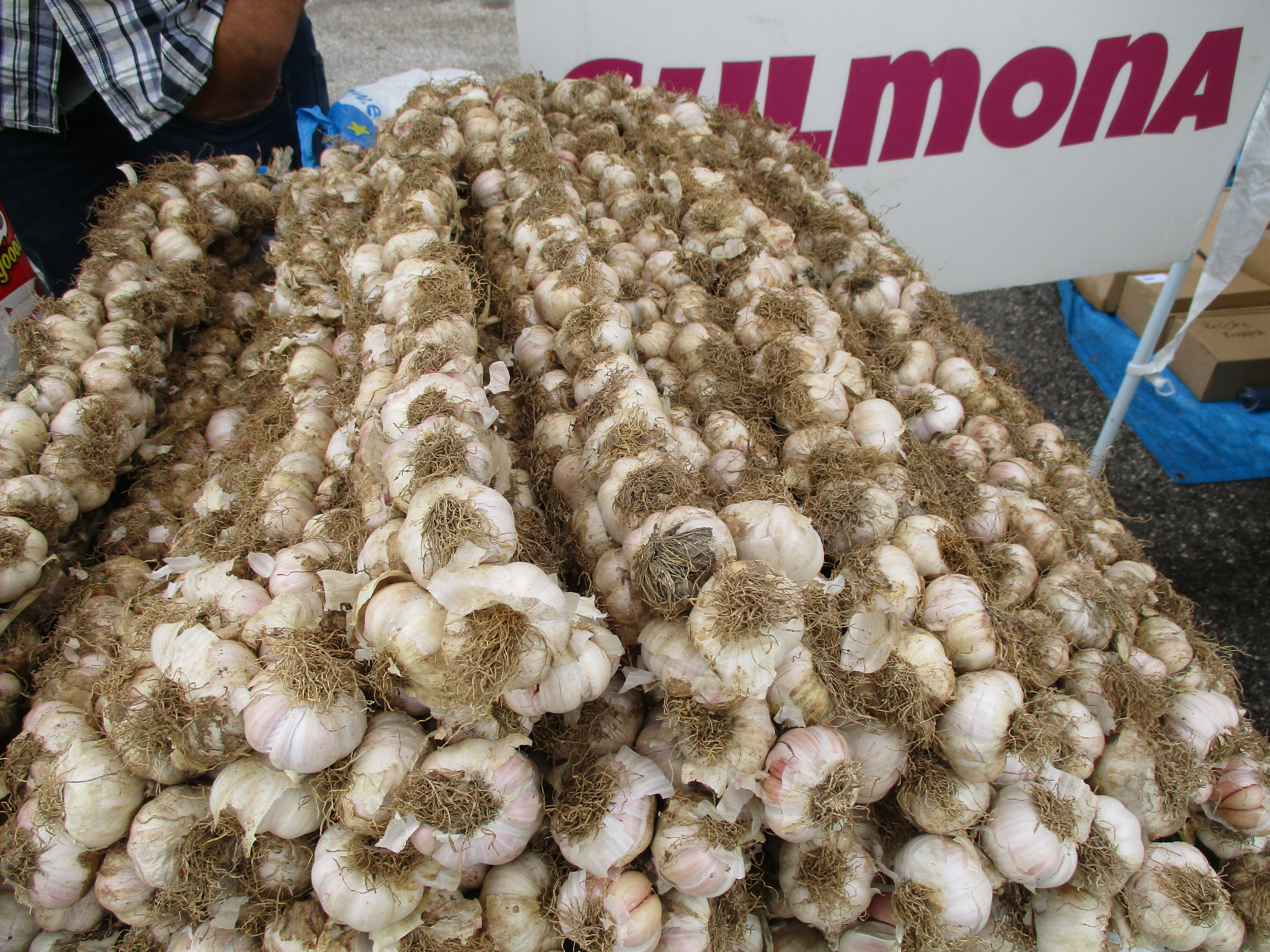
Red Sulmona Garlic

The Red Sulmona Garlic (Red Sulmona Garlic), also known as 'Aglio rosso di Sulmona, is a Abruzzese variety of garlic; it is listed as a traditional Italian food product (P.A.T.) by the Ministry of Agricultural, Food and Forestry Policies.

Red Sulmona garlic is grown on the Conca di Sulmona plateau, in the Valle Peligna area, in the province of L'Aquila. An all-Abruzzo excellence, which is grown in the autumn months, between November and December, and which is harvested during the summer, between June and July.
