= L'Aquila saffron =

Saffron product of Abruzzo, Italy

L'Aquila saffron (Italian: Zafferano dell'Aquila) is a saffron product of cuisine of Abruzzo, Italy. It is traditionally cultivated in Navelli plateau and in Subequana Valley, in the Park Municipalities of Fagnano Alto, Fontecchio, Molina Aterno, Tione degli Abruzzi. Saffron was introduced in Italy from Spain in 13th century by a friar Dominican belonging to the Santucci family of Navelli. The production in the Navelli Plain is favored by the karst of the soil, which avoids the stagnation of water which is unfavorable to the growth of the plant.

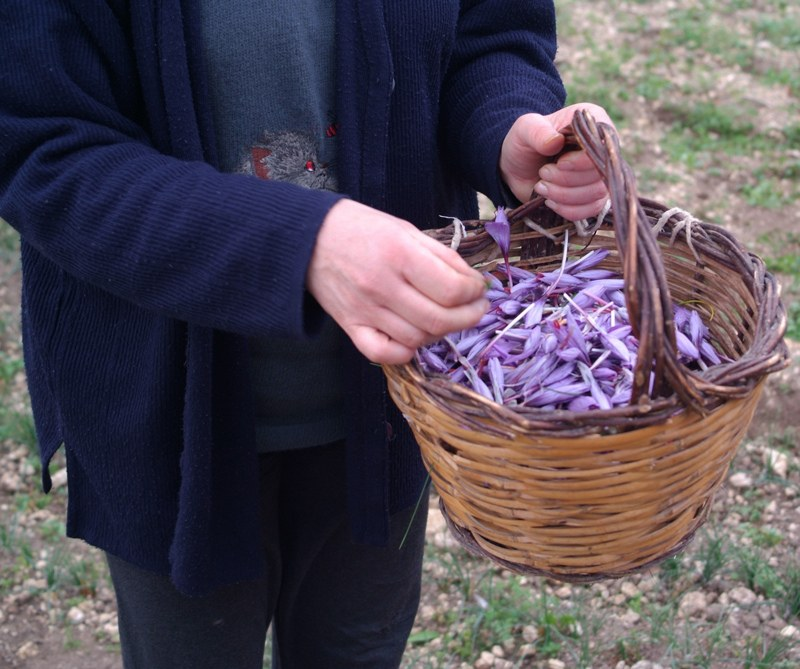
l'Aquila saffron

Under its Italian name "Zafferano dell'Aquila" the product is registered as a Protected Designation of Origin since February 4, 2005, while the establishment of the Consortium for the Protection of Zafferano dell'Aquila dates back to May 13, 2005. The name may only be used if it is produced according its specifications within the municipalities Barisciano, Caporciano, Fagnano Alto, Fontecchio, L'Aquila, Molina Aterno, Navelli, Poggio Picenze, Prata d'Ansidonia, San Demetrio nei Vestini, S. Pio delle Camere, Tione degli Abruzzi or Villa S. Angelo at an altitude of 350 -1000 metres above sea level.. It is included in the Slow Food movement Ark of Taste, an international catalogue of endangered heritage foods.

== Production ==
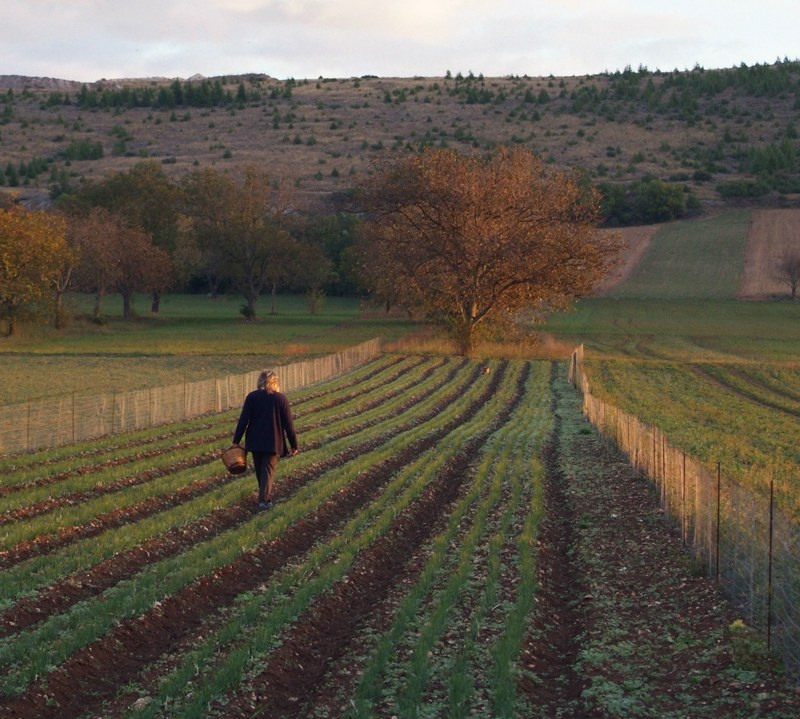
Saffron fields in Navelli, Abruzzo, Italy

The soil is prepared in spring with a 'plowing at a depth of 30 cm, with the simultaneous fertilization through about 30 t / ha of manure, being then prohibited the use of any fertilizer during the vegetative cycle. The surface is subsequently refined and leveled and 2 or 4 grooves are prepared at a distance of about 20 cm to accommodate the bulbs.

After a subsequent Milling of the soil, in August the bulbs are transplanted, with a density of about 10 t / ha, corresponding to about 600 000 bulbs. The soil is not irrigated and the bulbs are buried on the row in contact and at a depth of about 10 cm.

The first leaves filiform sprout with the first rains of September, with a development up to 40 cm. The flowers have six petals of a pinkish-purple color, with three scarlet red filaments representing the female part and three yellow anthers representing the male part.

The flowers are harvested around the second fortnight of October before they hatch at dawn. At their withering once they are brought indoors, the stigmas are removed which, placed on a sieve, are placed on the embers of wood of almond or oak for the toasting.

After roasting, the weight of the stigmas is reduced to one sixth of the initial weight, with 5–10% residual moisture, and from these the powder is prepared by grinding. The production of one kilogram of saffron requires about 200,000 flowers.

== Culinary use ==
Saffron in Abruzzo cuisine is used above all for fish dishes such as scapece alla vastese and saffron mussels; moreover in the region it is also used to produce the liqueur Liquore allo zafferano.

== L'Aquila saffron in culture ==
One legend wants the introduction of saffron due to Pontius Pilate whose residence in villas in the area would be testified by as many legends and actual archaeological finds.

=== Philately ===
In 2008, an Italian stamp, polychrome and serrated, worth €0.60, was issued featuring L'Aquila saffron and its PDO classification.

=== Cinema ===
Aquila saffron is mentioned in animated film Ratatouille (2007) by Pixar; in the scene, present both in the original English language edition (as L'Aquila saffron), in French (as Safran de l'Aquilà) and in Italian, where the product is characterized as "excellent".

== See also ==
- Cuisine of Abruzzo
