= Brodetto alla vastese =

Fish stew from Italia

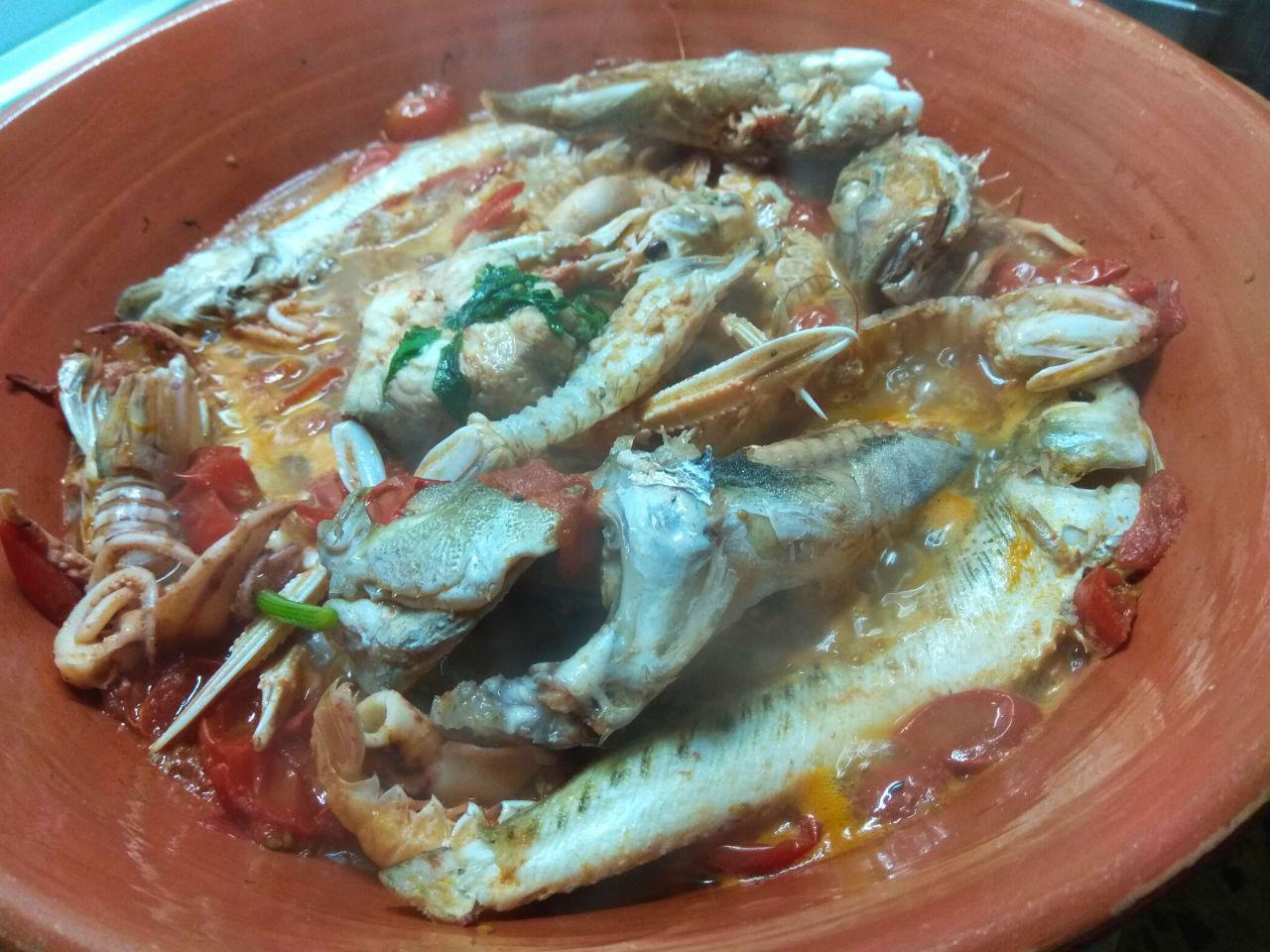
- Type: Stew
- Course: Main
- Region or state: Italy; Abruzzo
- Main ingredients: Fish, cherry tomatoes, garlic, peppers, parsley, oil, salt

Brodetto alla vastese is a fish stew made in Abruzzo region of Italy; Brodetto alla Vastese was born in the 19th century with the arrival in kitchens of the tomato, imported from the Americas.

== Ingredients ==
It's made with fish (cuttlefish, sole, cod, red mullet, weever, gurnard, monkfish, scorpionfish, skate, cod, clams, and mussels) cherry tomatoes, garlic, peppers, parsley, oil, salt

Unlike other fish broths typical of the Adriatic Sea, Vasto's brodetto doesn't use fried ingredients, nor does it contain water, broth, or vinegar, making it easier to prepare. Another difference is that the fish is cooked whole, not in pieces (except for some types that must be sliced, but only for space reasons), and potatoes are never added.

== See also ==
Media related to Brodetto at Wikimedia Commons

- List of stews
