= Cuisine of Sardinia =

Cuisine originating from the island of Sardinia

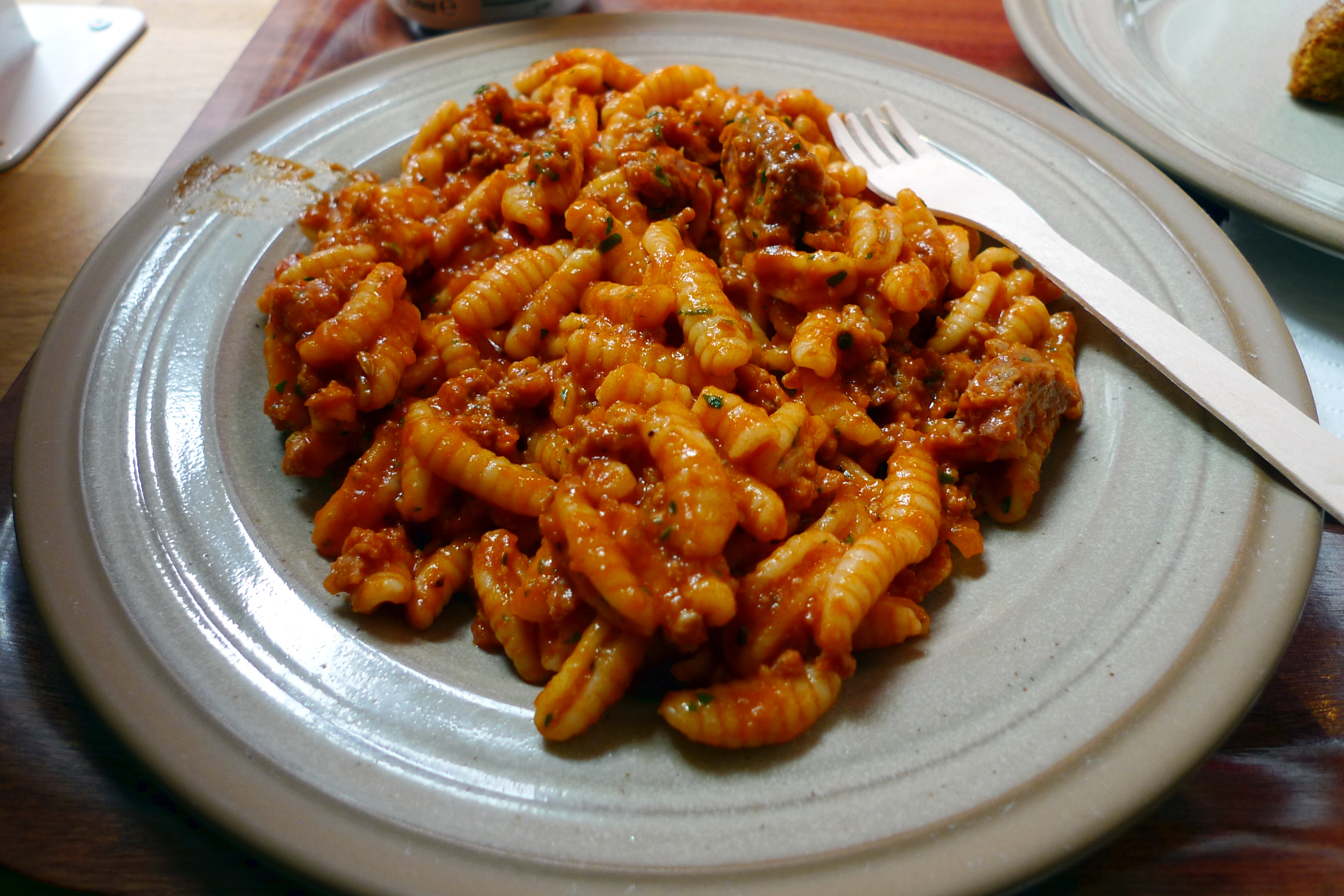
Malloreddus pasta, with sausage meat and sauce

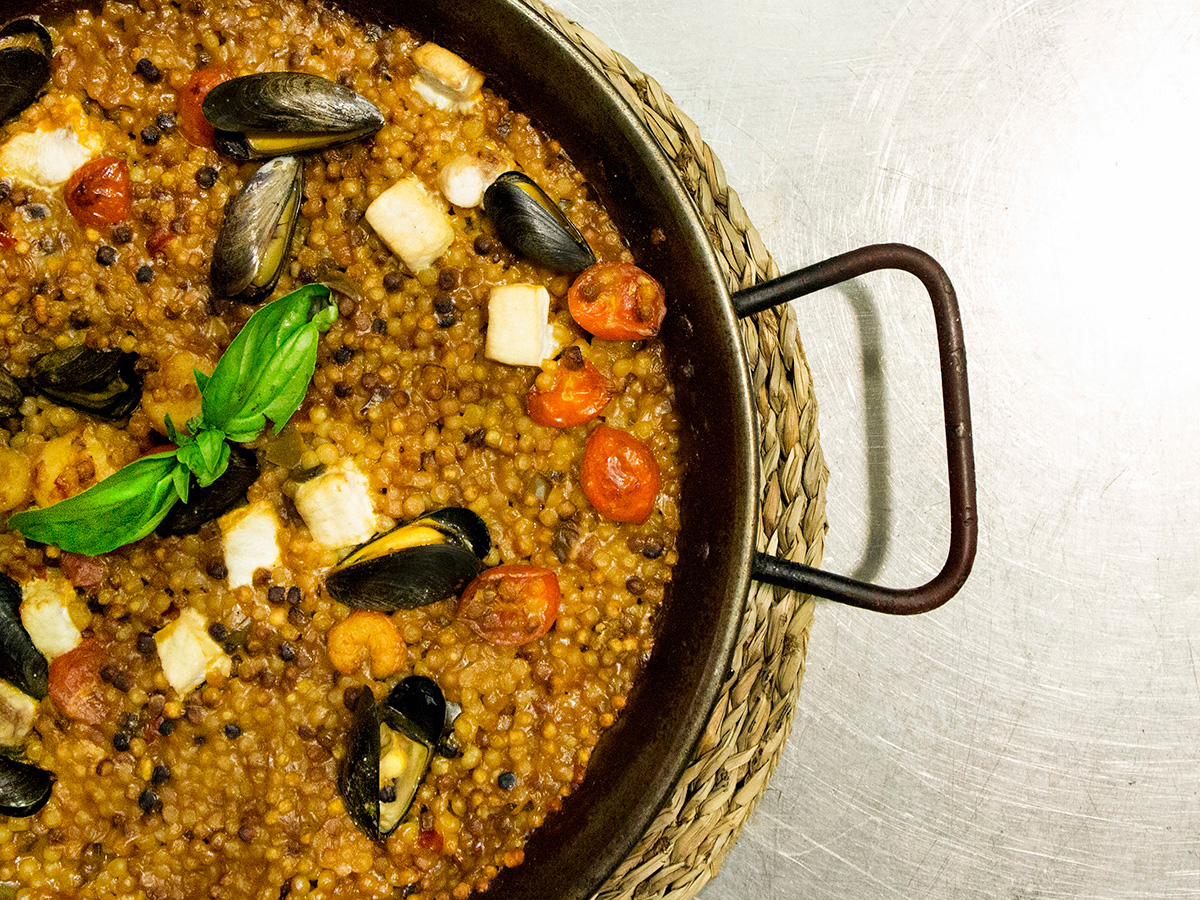
Fregula, a type of semolina pasta. A typical preparation of fregula is to simmer it in a tomato-based sauce with clams.

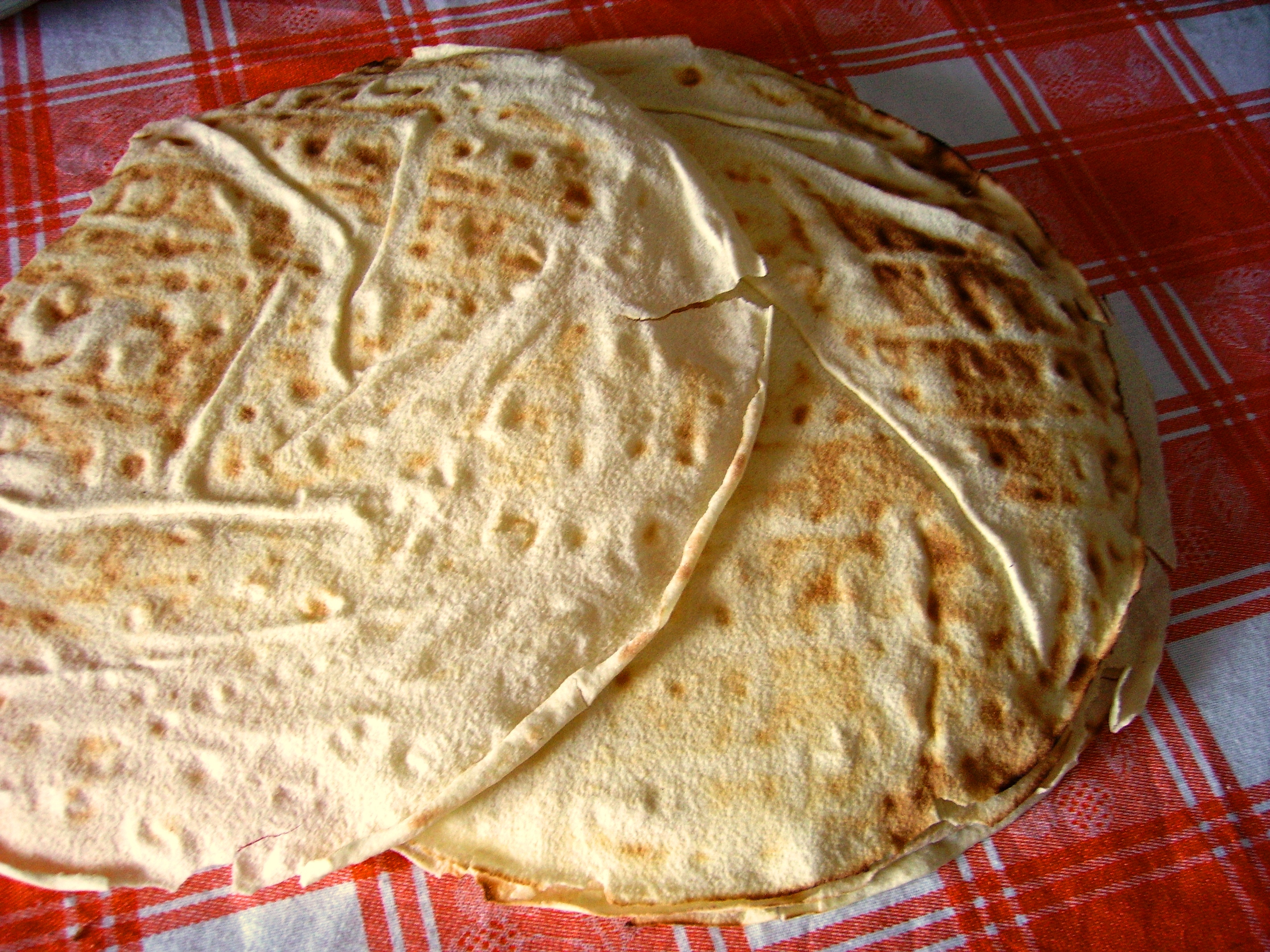
Traditional carasau bread

The cuisine of Sardinia is the traditional cuisine of the island of Sardinia. It is characterised by its variety and by the fact of having been enriched through a number of interactions with the other Mediterranean cultures while retaining its own identity.

Sardinia's food culture is strictly divided into food from the land and food from the sea, reflecting the island's history and geography. Sardinian cuisine is considered part of the Mediterranean diet, a nutritional model that was proclaimed by UNESCO as an intangible cultural heritage.

== Overview ==
Suckling pig and wild boar are roasted on the spit or boiled in stews of beans and vegetables, thickened with bread. Herbs such as mint and myrtle are widely used in the regional cuisine. Sardinia also has many special types of bread, made dry, which keeps longer than high-moisture breads. Malloreddus is a typical pasta of the region.

Also baked are carasau bread, civraxu bread, coccoi a pitzus, a highly decorative bread, and pistocu bread, made with flour and water only, originally meant for herders, but often served at home with tomatoes, basil, oregano, garlic, and a strong cheese. Rock lobster, scampi, squid, tuna, and sardines are the predominant seafoods.

Casu martzu is a sheep's cheese produced in Sardinia, but is of questionable legality due to hygiene concerns.

== Seafood ==
- Typical dishes of Cagliari are the fregula cun còciula ("fregula with clams"); the còciula e cotza a sa schiscionera ("clams and mussels cooked in a pan"), and then the burrida a sa casteddaja (based on dogfish, vinegar and walnuts), the cassòla, a soup combining various kinds of fish, crustaceans and mollusks; s'aligusta a sa casteddaja ("Cagliaritan-style lobster"); the common spaghitus with clams and butàriga, and the spaghitus cun arritzonis, that is sea urchin spaghetti with artichoke or wild asparagus.
- The cuisine typical of the Oristano area and the Cabras ponds, but even Bosa, often includes eels. A typical product is bottarga, salted and cured roe, usually from mullet. It can be served alone or used to dress pasta. Another traditional product is sa merca, made up of slices of boiled and salted mullet being wrapped in a sack aromatized with a marsh herb, the zibba (obione in Italian). A variety of the burrida (dogfish) can also be tasted.
- Along the Sulcis coastline are some of the most ancient tuna fisheries of the Mediterranean. The local cuisine is influenced by Genoa, and is strongly based on bluefin tuna fishing and related products, like bottarga di tonno, the tuna heart, the musciame (until 1979 made with dolphin meat), the buzzonaglia, the lattume and the Tabarchin cascà, a variety of the couscous dressed with vegetables.
- The cuisine of Alghero reflects the Catalan influence permeating the town, which can be seen from the Catalan way in which the lobster is prepared, which is boiled with tomato, celery and onion and accompanied by a sauce of lemon, olive oil, salt and pepper.
- Towards Santa Teresa and the Maddalena archipelago, octopus salads are a typical specialty, while in Olbia there are dishes based on mussels and clams. From both the north and the south of the island are the so-called ortziadas or bultigghjata, floured and fried sea anemones.

== First courses ==
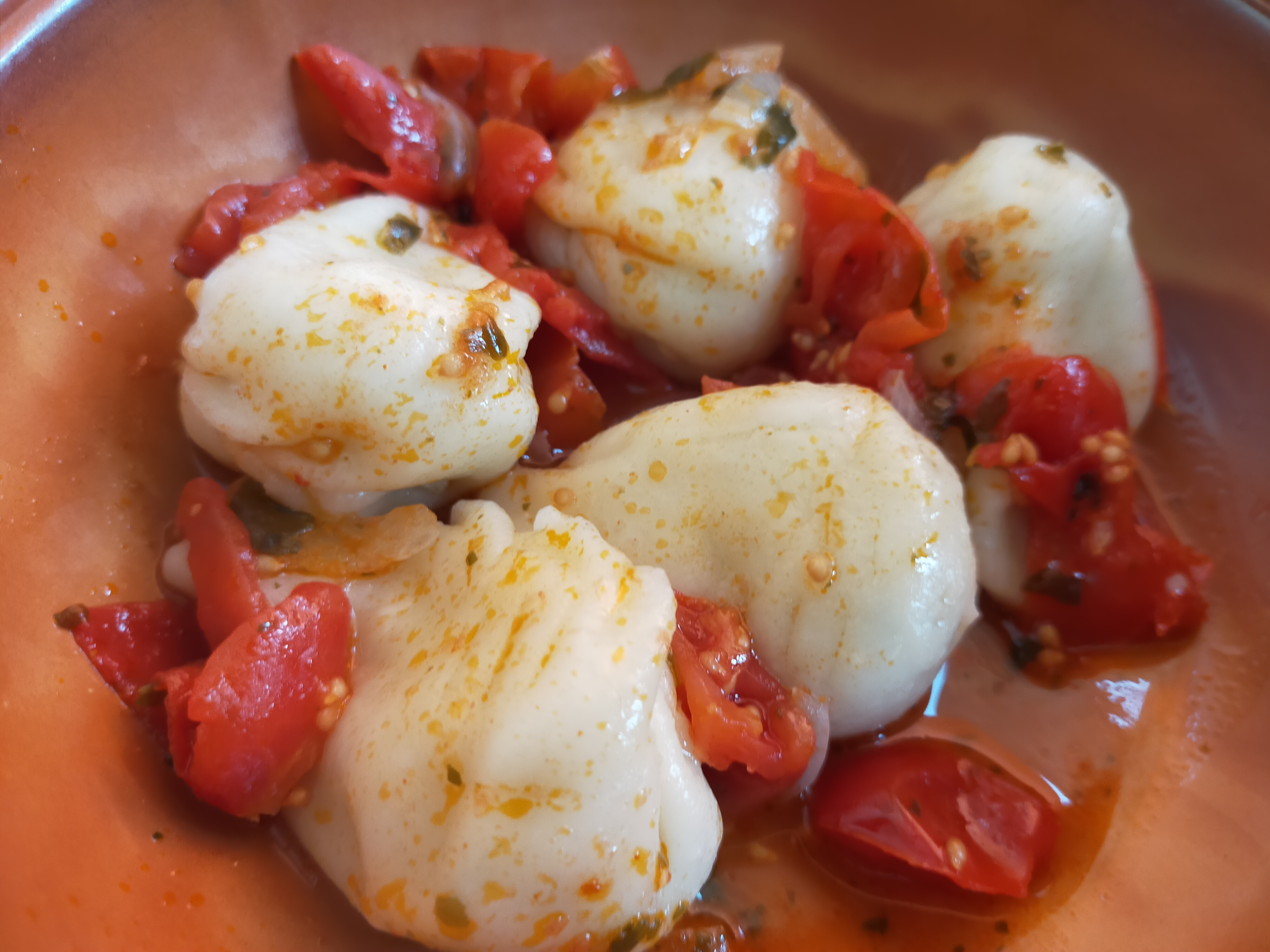
Culurgiones

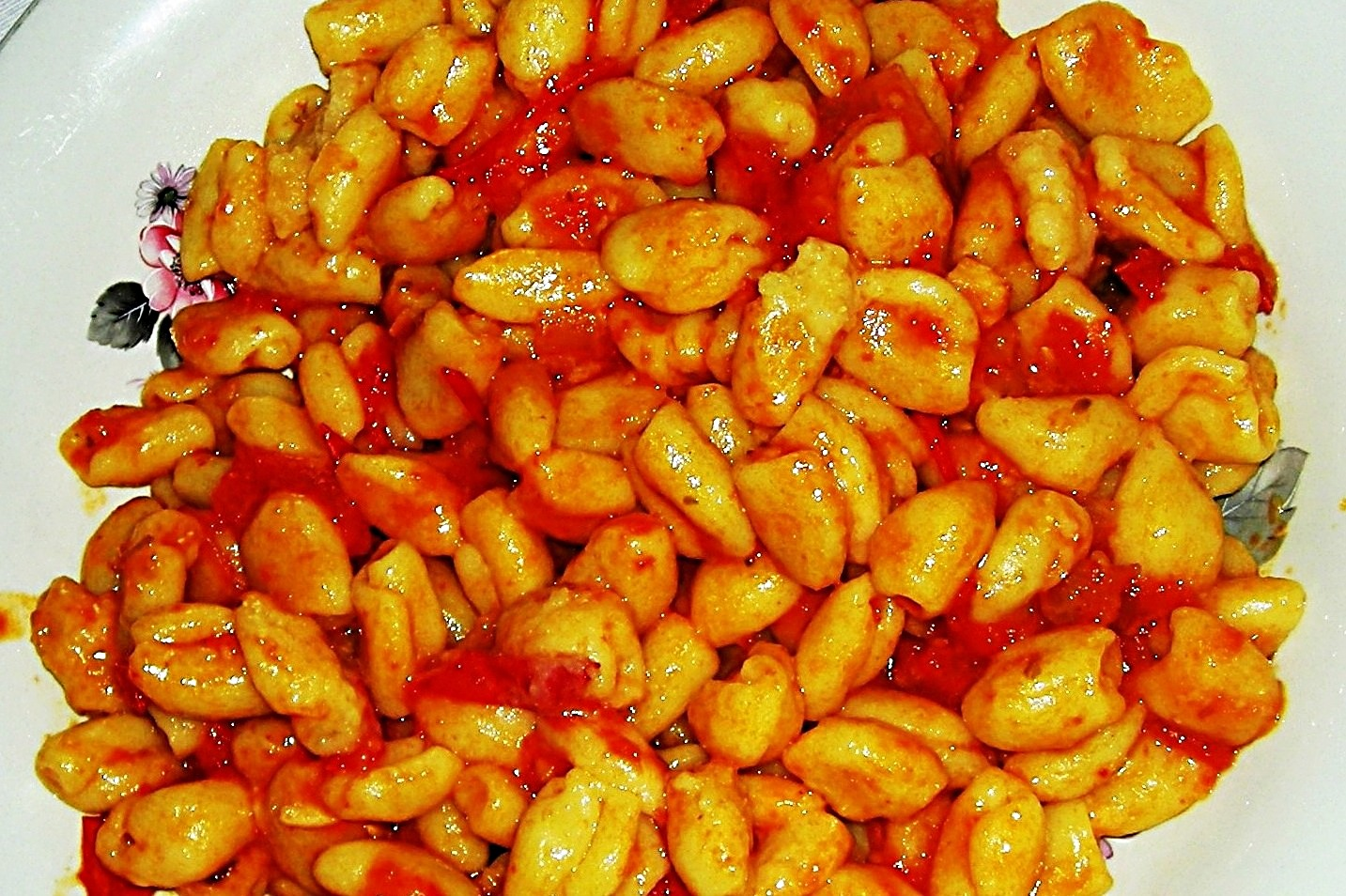
Macarrones cravàos, o de punzu

- The malloreddus are tapered-shaped durum wheat semolina pasta traditionally flavored with saffron. They are usually seasoned with campidano or sausage sauce, but among the typical recipes there is the variant with casu furriau that is with melted cheese and saffron. They are also known as cigiones in Sassari and Cravaos in Nuoro, and – in Italian – gnocchetti sardi;
- The culurgiones is a fresh durum wheat dumplings filled with ricotta and mint, or with a filling based on potato, fresh cheese and mint.
- Lorighittas is a type of pasta prepared since ancient times in Morgongiori, a small town in the middle of the island, weaving a double strand of pasta.
- Macarrones de busa is a sort of bucatini made with a special elongated iron.
- Macarrones furriaos are dumplings topped with very fresh pecorino cheese, melted together with the bran to form a sort of cream.
- Macarrones cravàos, o de punzu or macarrones de ùngia in Gallurese called chiusòni or ciusòni, are particular small dumplings of durum wheat semolina in the form of small cylinders of 3–4 cm in size, spread all over the island but in particular in Gallura;
- The fregula is a particular dry pasta made from durum wheat semolina, worked in small lumps and used for typical dishes such as fregula with clams or fregula with sauce. It is also used to make soups with meat broths;
- Gallurese soup or suppa cuatta is a dish consisting of Sardinian bread, casizolu, spices and pecorino cheese, all softened with broth and cooked in the oven;
- Typical of the Sassarese is the fabadda (favata), traditionally prepared during the carnival period, which consists of a soup made with dried beans, cabbage, fennel, pork rind and pork.
- Panada is an empanada made with puff pastry and stuffed with lamb (or eels), potatoes, and dried tomatoes; it is prepared in all the island, being nowadays a specialty of various towns such as Assemini, Oschiri, Berchidda, Pattada, and Cuglieri.
- Pane frattau or pane carasau is a toasted bread soaked in the broth, arranged in layers interspersed with grated pecorino and tomato sauce and with a poached egg on top.
- The soup and 'merca is made with su succu, a particular type of pasta similar to tagliolini, with tomatoes, zucchini, potatoes (depending on the variants), with the final addition of curdled sheep's milk (frue);
- Filindeu is a pasta that is made only in Nuoro, made with the finest semolina, woven in a particular way and served with sheep's broth and plenty of fresh cheese.
- Su succu is a first dish typical of Busachi, prepared with very thin tagliolini, or angel hair, cooked in sheep's broth, flavored with saffron in stigmas, and seasoned with fresh, acidulous pecorino.

== Second courses ==
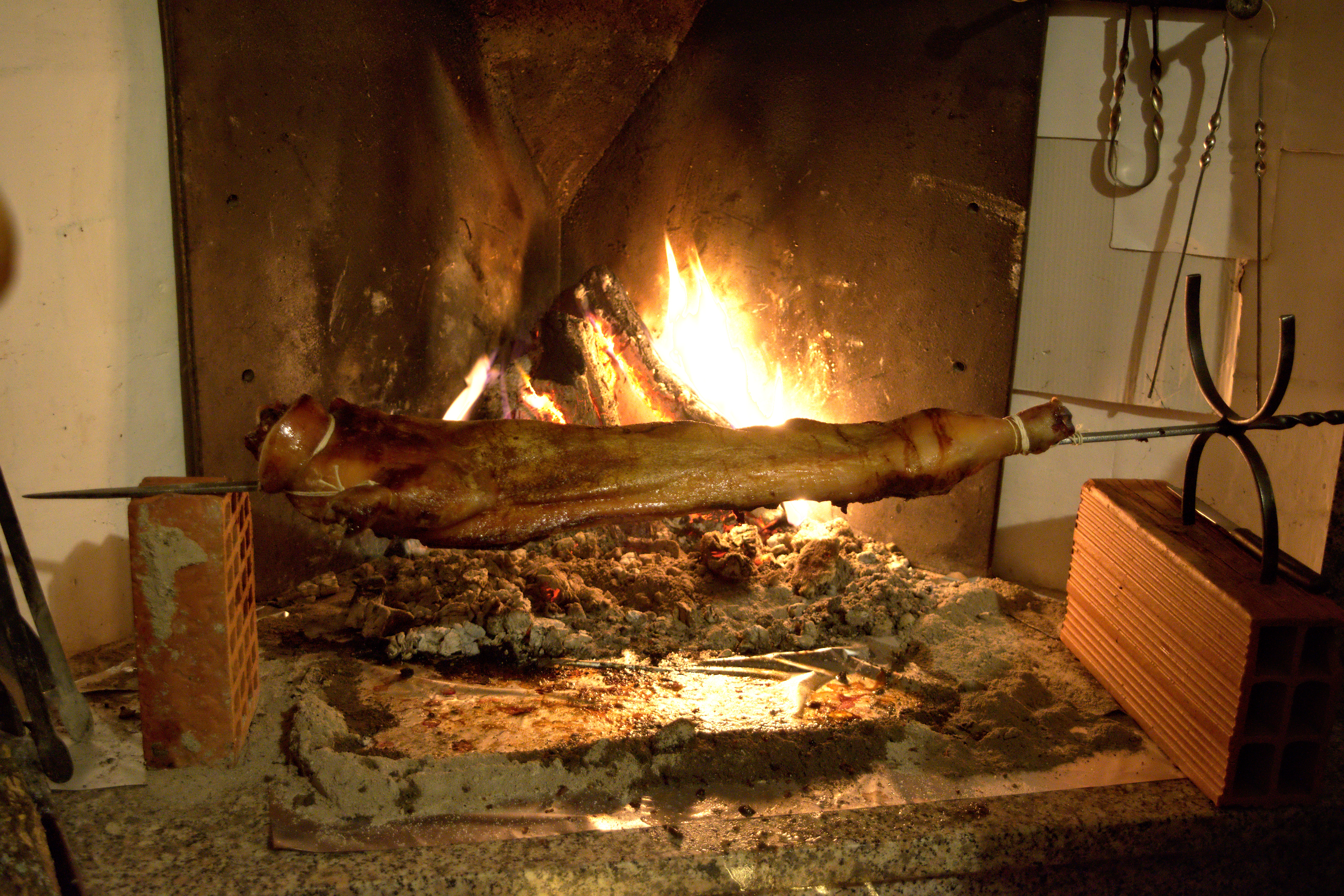
Porcetto

- Porchetta or porcetto, in Sardinian porceddu or porcheddu, the suckling pig of about 4 – 5 kg or twenty days, cooked slowly on a spit, on grills and flavored after cooking with myrtle or rosemary. This roast is a classic of Sardinian pastoral cuisine;
- roast suckling lamb, weighing a maximum of 7 kg, white flesh and soft and intense flavor is a tradition among the oldest of the island, always a land of shepherds of which this dish was one of the most typical habits food. Lamb meat also forms the basis of various typical Panadas;
- roast baby goat is a particularly sought after dish. The kid is roasted slowly on a spit. Normally the only seasoning is the fine salt, which is given during cooking.

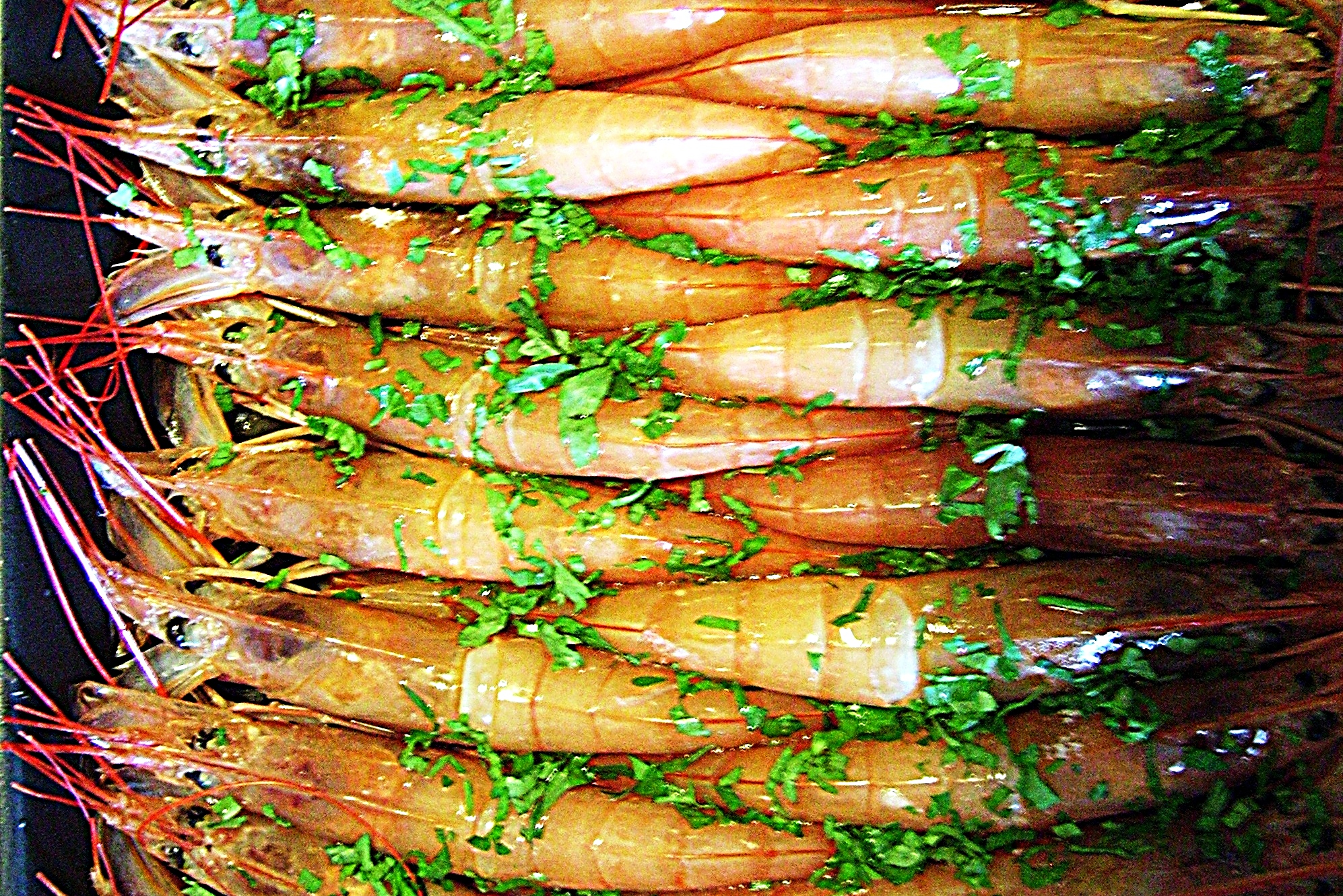
Carabineros prawns with Vernaccia.

- wild boar meat cooked with the carraxu method (cooking in an underground hole). This particular cooking consists in filling the embers hole to heat the walls; Once the ash has been removed, the branches of myrtle and thyme are spread out on the bottom, laying the wild boar on top of it and then covering it with other branches; then closes the hole with the earth and lights up on it a fire. It is also cooked in sweet and sour, cutting the meat into small pieces and browning it in chopped onion, parsley, myrtle and thyme and then adding vinegar and tomato sauce;

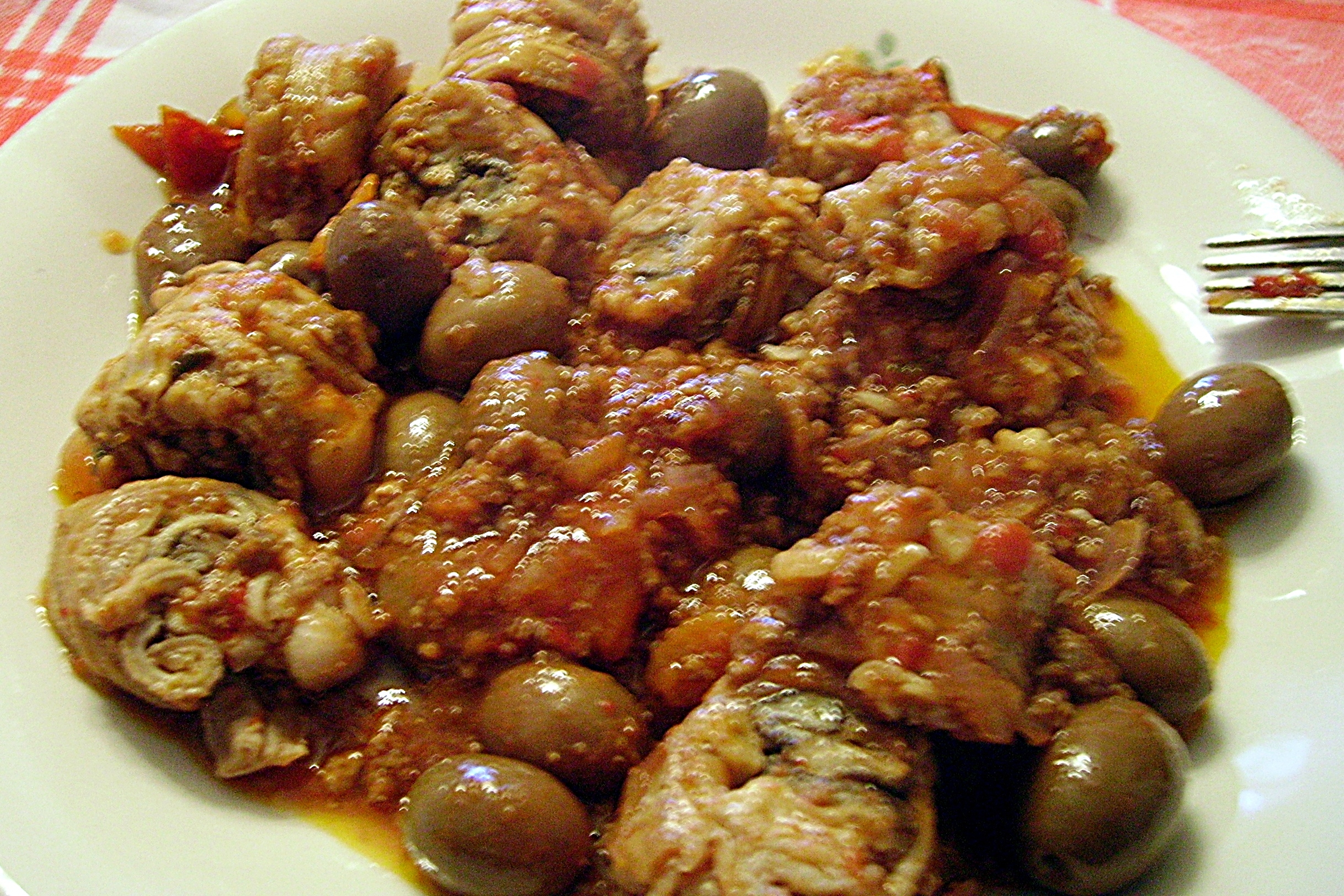
Stewed Cordula with olives

- Cordula or Cordedda consists of intestines of braided kid or lamb cooked and wrapped around a spit or cooking it in a pan with peas (cordula cun pisurci) or other variants;
- the trattalia or Tattaliu, based on lamb or goat's breast, is cooked roasted with a spit, piercing alternating pieces of liver, heart, sweetbreads, and lung that must first be partially cooked, wrapped with peritoneum and tied with all the neatly cleaned, or in a pan with peas or artichokes;
- the Zurrette or "sambene" is a dish prepared with sheep's blood seasoned with animal fat (obtained by frying a beat of "tripe" tramacuo – the omentum of the sheep – in extra virgin olive oil), onion, thyme snake and mint (puleu, wild mint), grated pecorino and shredded carasau bread, cooked inside the animal's stomach, by boiling or, rarely, on the embers.
- the Berbeche in coat or the boiled sheep with onions and potatoes, served with carasau bread soaked in the cooking broth.
- i Pillonis de tàccula is a dish based on game, mainly thrushes (durduros) and merlons (meurra) boiled, salted and flavored with myrtle leaves;
- the zimino or ziminu cooked in a grabiglia or veal entrails such as the parasangu (diaphragm), the cannaculu (intestine), heart, kidneys, liver and spleen, cooked in a grill on the grill is a traditional sassarese dish.
- le Mungetas or snails (also called snails), in their various sizes ranging from the minudda ciuta (Theba pisana) boiled with potatoes, to the thick ciogas (Eobania vermiculata) prepared with a spicy sauce or with garlic and parsley, to the coir (Cornu aspersum) that are served filled with a mixture of cheese, eggs, parsley and breadcrumbs, to the Mungetas cooked in a pan with garlic, oil, parsley and breadcrumbs. As well as a typical dish from Ossi and Sassari, they are present as a specialty in Gesico nel Medio Campidano.
- Su Ghisadu typical logudorese dish of sheep's meat or wild pork roasted over low heat with tomato, bay leaf, garlic and parsley; the sauce is an excellent condiment for gnocchetti "cicciones" or ravioli "colunzones".
- The small spit ispinada where sheep meat is stuffed into softer cuts, alternating with parts of the back fat.

== Liqueurs ==
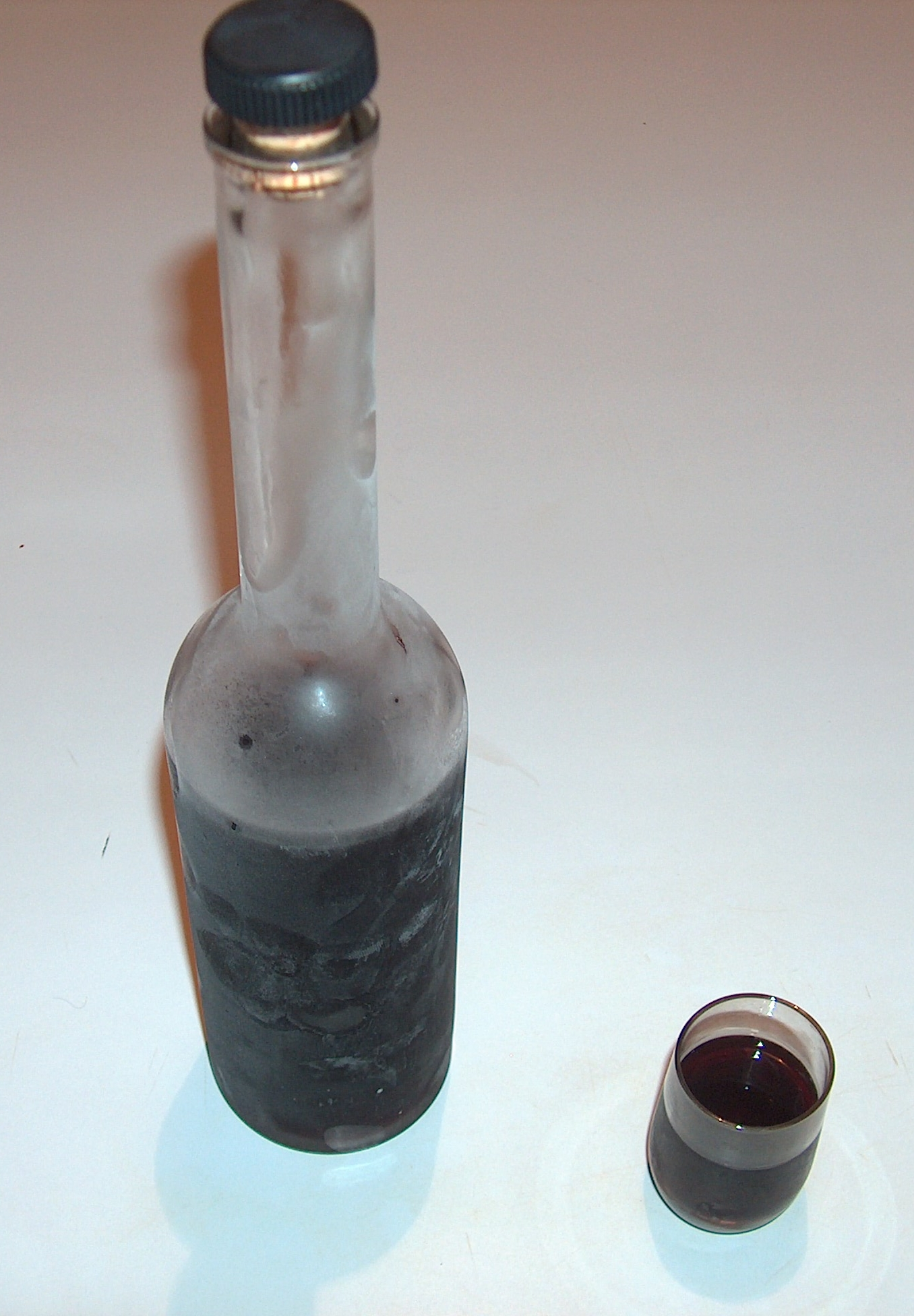
Homemade Sardinian mirto

Mirto is a popular liqueur in the Mediterranean islands of Sardinia, Corsica and Capraia. It is obtained from the myrtle plant through the alcoholic maceration of the berries or a compound of berries and leaves. Myrtle grows freely in Sardinia, where the liqueur was consumed as part of a local niche market, in two varieties: the one with black berries and the other one with the white ones; legend has it that, long ago, Sardinian bandits introduced this particular usage of the plant to the nearby island of Corsica, where the liqueur has also been considered a traditional drink since then.

== Sweets ==
Even desserts, like the other products of Sardinian gastronomy, vary considerably from region to region. Here are the most known ones:

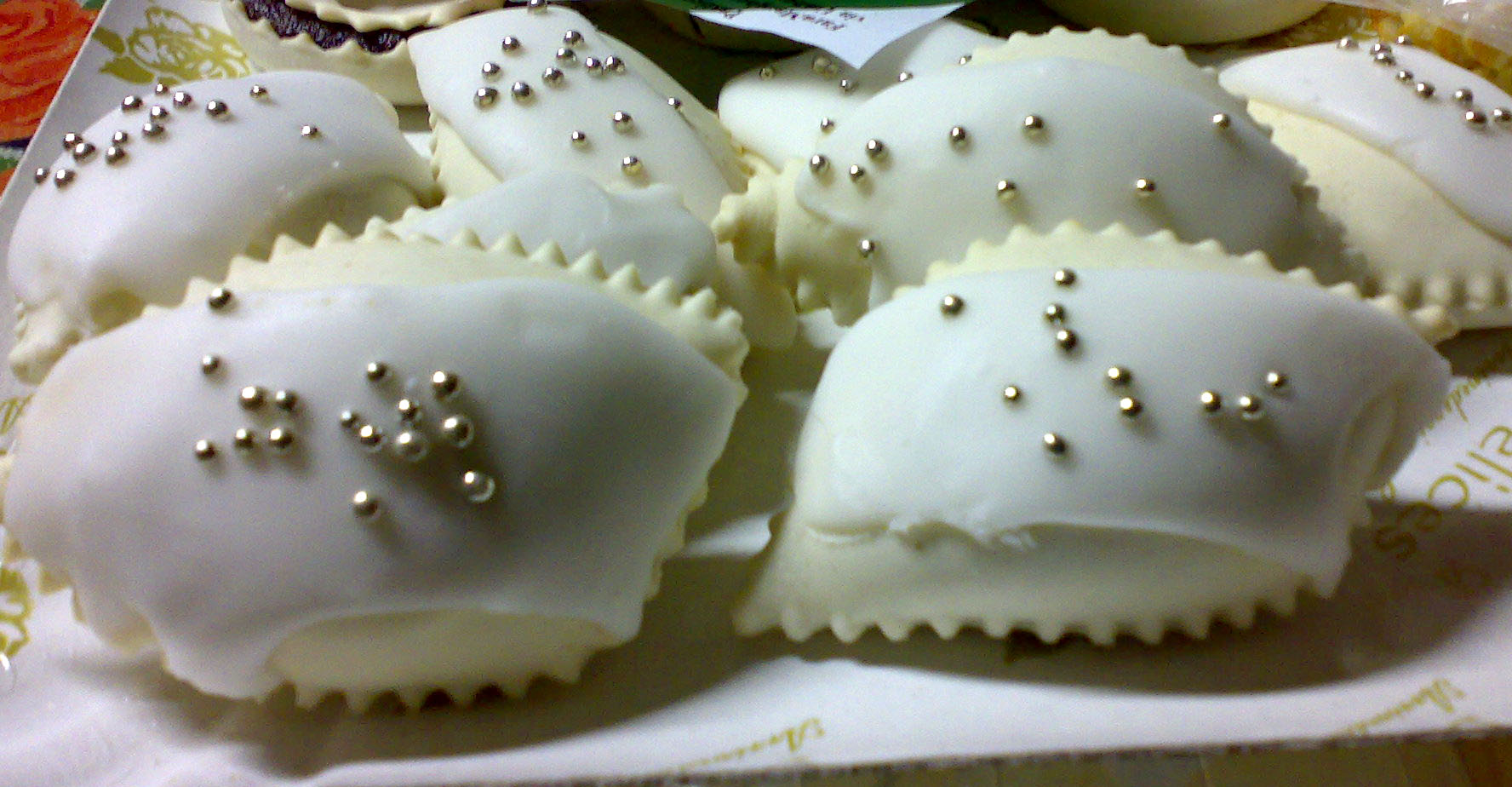
Copuletas, typical dessert from Ozieri

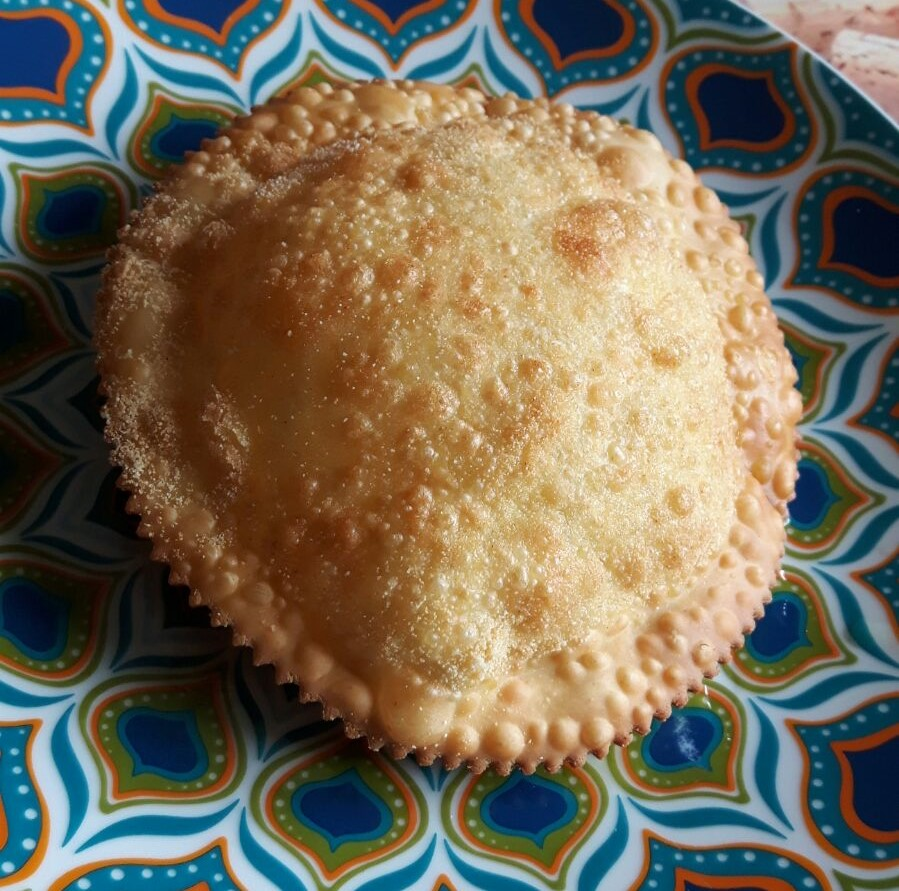
Seadas, a Sardinian savoury dessert which can be served with sweet toppings.

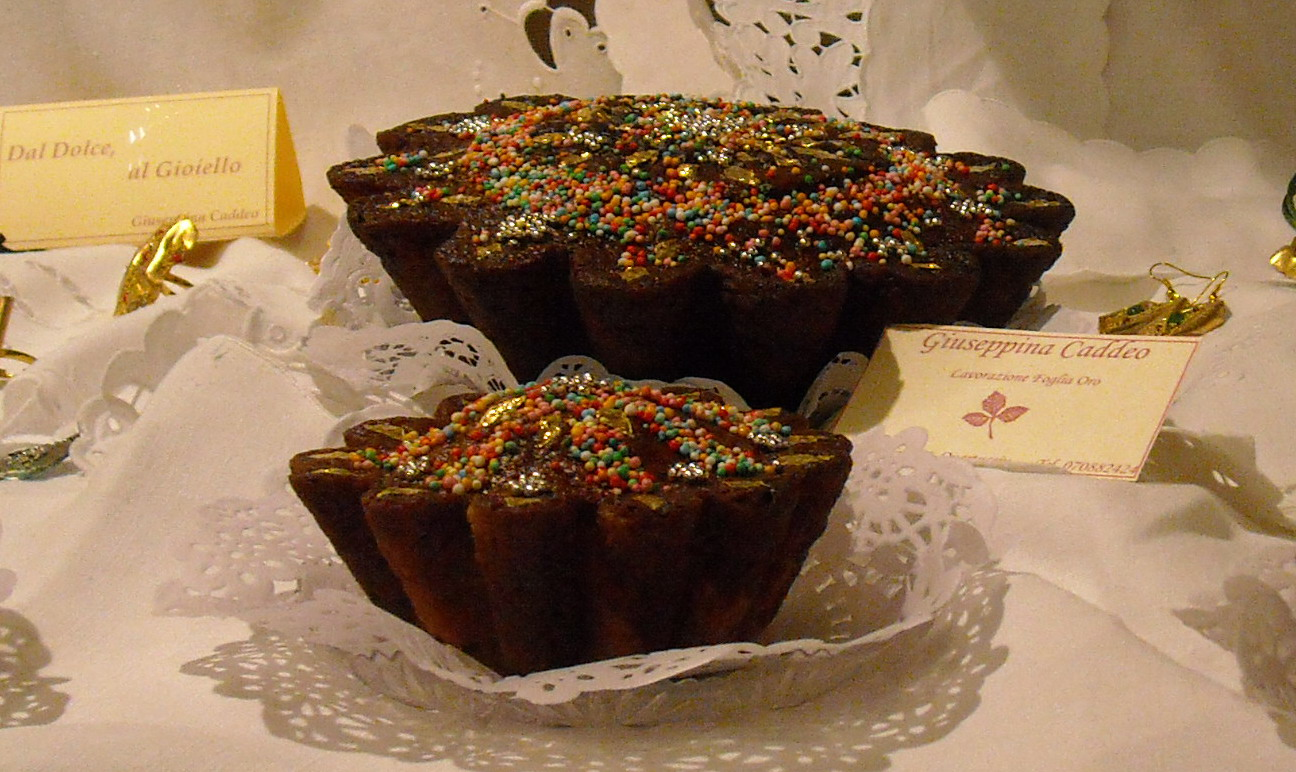
Pan 'e Saba

- the Seadas or Sebadas, are discs of thin dough that enclose a filling of fresh, slightly sour pecorino cheese, melted with semolina, or fresh cow, and flavored with lemon, fried and covered with melted honey, preferably bitter (like that of corbezzolo);
- the Casadinas, typical of Logudoro and Barbagia, are filled pasta pies with a low layer of lemon-flavored fresh cheese. Their traduction for Italians is Formaggelle; they are also widespread in the variant with ricotta and take the name of Regotinas or in Italian Ricottelle.
- the Pàrdulas are very similar to the Casadinas but the filling is based on ricotta, they have a domed appearance, are softer than casadinas and are covered with powdered or granulated sugar. They are typical of Campidano.
- Aranzada is a common dessert in the Baronies and in the Nuoro area. It is prepared with candied orange peel in honey and toasted almonds, rhomboidal in shape and presented on an orange leaf;
- the Pabassinas, Papassinos or Pabassinus, in Italian Papassini, are spread all over the territory and are prepared with semolina, walnuts, raisins, almonds or hazelnuts;
- the Cattas, Frigjolas or Frisolas or Frisjoli longhi are prepared mainly during the carnival and are made with flour, potatoes, water, sugar, anise and grated orange peel, fried in the form of long cords;
- the Orilletas are a dessert prepared with flour dough and eggs. After frying they are immersed in a hot syrup of honey and water;
- the Copulettas are a double disk of thin shortcrust pastry filled with sapa or cooked honey. They are mainly spread in the Goceano and in Ozieri;
- the Gueffus or Guelfos, in Italian Sospiri, balls made of ground almonds, sugar and lemon. They are typical of Ozieri and packed with small sheets of colored paper;
- Candelaus are desserts prepared in the most varied forms and prepared with a dough of almond paste that incorporates a mixture of fresh almonds, flavored with orange blossom water and glazed;
- the Pistocus finis, in Italian Biscotti di Fonni, also called the 'Sardinian Ladyfinger Biscuits';
- the Tziliccas, Tiriccas or Caschettas, with a horseshoe, crescent or heart shape. They consist of an external part of short pastry and a filling that depending on the area can be either sapa and walnuts, or honey and saffron;
- the Is Angules are a sweet typical of the Ortueri area, with a round shape, amber-colored, decorated with drawings made with the momperiglia with the shapes of flowers, fruit or animals;
- the Bianchinos, Bianchittus or Bianchittos, are meringues, prepared with whipped egg whites, of pyramidal shape and of very friable structure, often garnished with almonds;
- the Cruxoneddus de mèndula or Culurgioneddos de mèndula are raviolini made with puff pastry filled with almonds, fried and dusted with powdered sugar. They are also found stuffed with custard, ricotta or sapa cream;
- Amarettos, also called Marigosos, are sweet macaroons prepared with ingredients based on sweet almonds (about 70%) and bitter almonds (30%), sugar, egg white and lemon peel;
- the Bucconettes, typical of the Barbì of Belvì, are prepared with toasted and chopped hazelnuts, grated zest of lemon and orange, mixed, shaped into balls and cooked in honey syrup and sugar, wrapped in tinfoil and then in sheets of colored paper;
- the Abbamele is one of the oldest gastronomic products of the rural culture of Sardinia, made of honey. It is also called "decoction of honey" or "honey and pollen" or "honey sapa" in other regions of Italy;
- the Pane 'e saba, a typical winter sweet from barbaricino oven, prepared with the saba;
- the nougat of Tonara, as well as those of Pattada, Ozieri and Orgosolo, has an ivory color because it is prepared with honey from the Mediterranean;
- the Rujolos are ricotta balls and grated orange or lemon peel then dipped in a hot solution of water and honey (to grind);
- Gatò de mèndula is a crunchy of toasted almonds and flavored with orange peel;
- Mandagadas are also known as Tritzas, Acciuleddi. They are desserts made of a braided and honey-impregnated dough. They are prepared with durum wheat flour, eggs and Sardinian honey;
- the Mustatzolos, or Mustaciolus, as the Papassinos are lozenge-shaped and flavored with lemon, cinnamon and glazed in the upper part;
- the Papai-biancu, typical in the city of Alghero with the name of Manjar blanc in Catalan, is prepared with cream of milk, starch and lemon peel.
- the Pistoccheddus de capa, a dessert originally from the village of Serrenti, a hard golden-shaped biscuit shaped according to animal shapes and covered with icing "sa cappa", silver little devils and gilded friezes.

== Bread ==
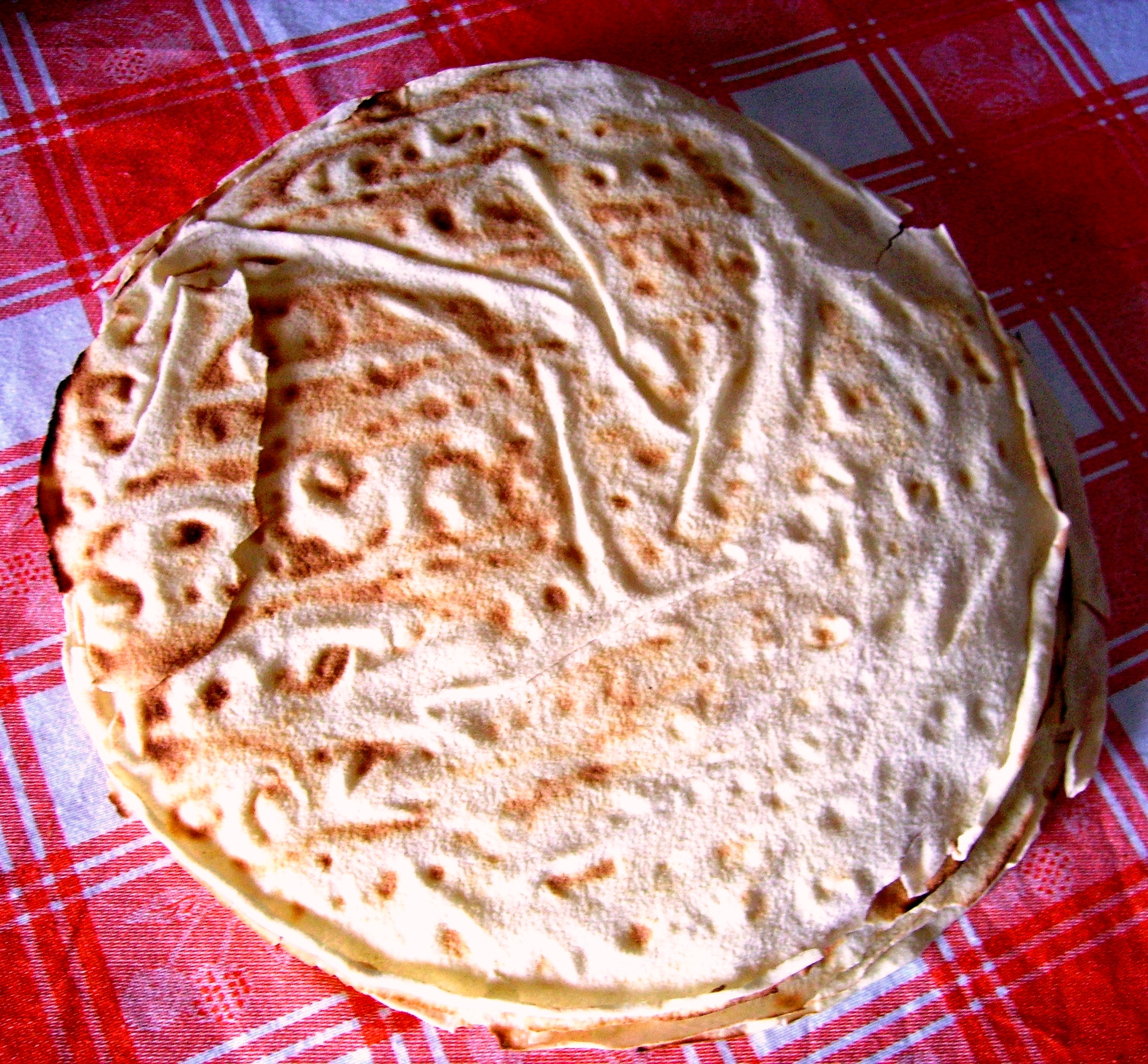
Carasau bread

- Pane carasau is a bread with the shape of thin, very crunchy discs obtained through a double cooking in a wood oven; it can be consumed dry even after many days or slightly wet and rolled up; guttiau bread is a preparation of the same carasau bread that is heated in the oven with a little oil and salt;
- the Pistocu is produced mainly in Ogliastra. It is prepared in the same way as carasau, but has a more consistent thickness and is preferred to consume it moist;
- the Civraxu or Civargiu is a large loaf typical of Campidano and southern Sardinia in general;
- the Cocoi a pitzus is a type of decorated bread, once produced for the great occasions, today always present;
- the Modditzosu (from "modditzi", the common mastic in the Mediterranean stain that provides the scented wood used for cooking) is circular in shape and very soft, also produced with the addition of potatoes, mainly in the area of Dorgali but widespread on all the regional territory;
- the Tzichi, typical of Bonorva;
- the Spianada, of circular and soft shape, characteristic of the nuorese, was once prepared during the monthly bread making of Pane carasau and consumed in the following days.

== Wine ==
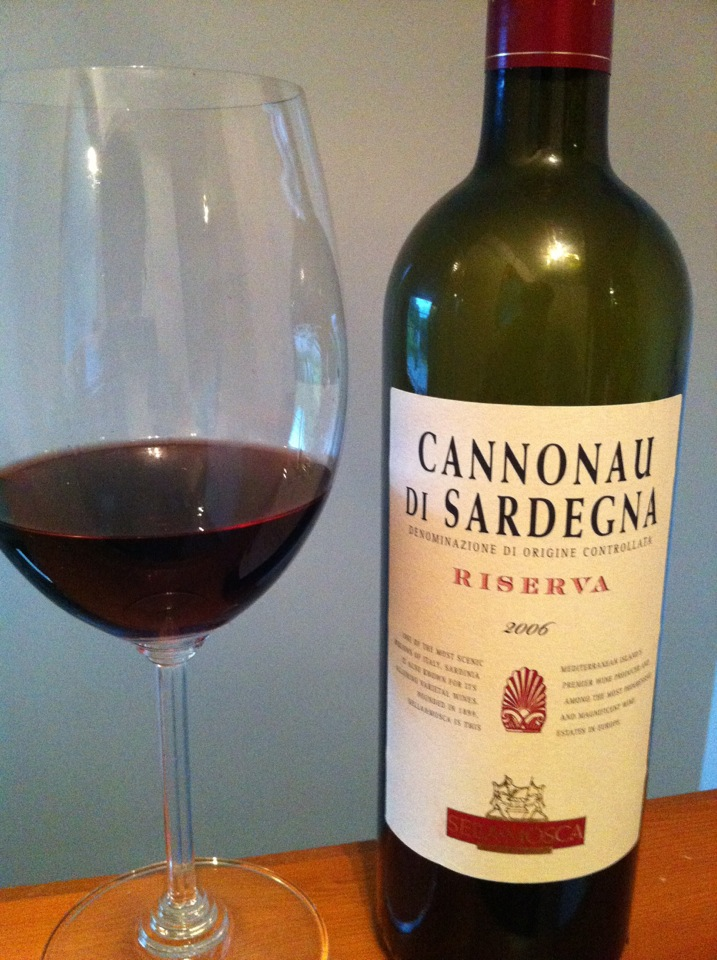
Cannonau wine

Several vineyards are present in every corner across the island, from the Campidanese and coastal plains to the hilly and mountainous highlands. The particular composition of the soil and the sunny climate allows for high-quality production. The long winemaking tradition has its roots in the Nuraghic past, and from then on it did not suffer any interruptions since the island never fell under Arab rule, and thus the Islamic prohibition on alcohol did not affect Sardinia at all; on the contrary, winemaking saw a major increase in the Byzantine and the Judgedoms period. Today, there are 15 IGT, 19 DOC and 1 Docg wines on the island.

Cannonau (or Cannonao) is a typical Sardinian red wine, rich in phenols, made from Grenache grapes, suited to drinking with a red-meat meal.

== Cheese ==
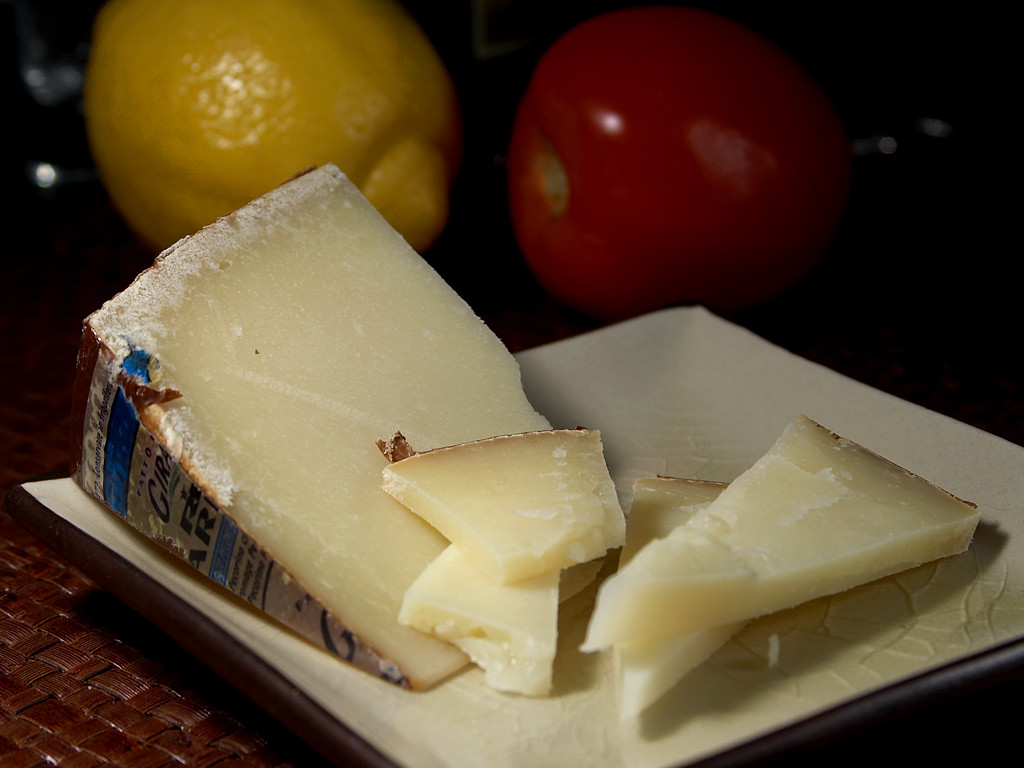
Pecorino sardo cheese

- Pecorino sardo is a firm cheese from Sardinia made from sheep milk, specifically from the milk of the local Sarda sheep. It was awarded denominazione d'origine (DO) status in 1991 and granted protected designation of origin (PDO) protection in 1996, the year in which this European Union certification scheme was introduced. There are two varieties: pecorino sardo dolce, aged for 20–60 days; and pecorino sardo maturo, which is aged more than 2 months. Pecorino sardo is an uncooked hard cheese, made from fresh whole sheep's milk curdled using calf's rennet. The mixture is salted and poured into moulds. The dolce weights 1.0-2.3 kilograms, while the maturo weighs 1.7-4.0 kilograms. The rind varies from deep yellow to dark brown in colour and encases a paste that varies from white to straw-yellow. The sharpness of the flavour depends on the length of maturation.
- Casu martzu, sometimes spelled casu marzu, and also called casu modde, casu cundídu and casu fràzigu in Sardinian, is a traditional Sardinian sheep milk cheese that contains live insect larvae (maggots). Casu martzu goes beyond typical fermentation to a stage of decomposition, brought about by the digestive action of the larvae of the cheese fly of the Piophilidae family. These larvae are deliberately introduced to the cheese, promoting an advanced level of fermentation and breaking down of the cheese's fats. The texture of the cheese becomes very soft, with some liquid (called làgrima, Sardinian for "teardrop") seeping out. The larvae themselves appear as translucent white worms, roughly 8 mm (5/16 in) long.

== See also ==
- Italian cuisine
- Abruzzese cuisine
- Apulian cuisine
- Arbëreshë cuisine
- Emilian cuisine
- Cuisine of Liguria
- Lombard cuisine
- Cuisine of Mantua
- Cuisine of Basilicata
- Neapolitan cuisine
- Piedmontese cuisine
- Roman cuisine
- Sicilian cuisine
- Tuscan cuisine
- Venetian cuisine

== Bibliography ==
- Costantina Frau, Mandigos e usanzias in Sardinna, CUEC, 2000
- Alessandro Molinari Pradelli, La cucina sarda, Newton Compton Editore, 2002, ISBN 88-8289-684-6.
- Pietro Oliva, Maria Giovanna Poli, Cucina sarda, Giunti Editore, 2004, ISBN 88-440-2875-1.
- AA.VV, Anna Pau e Paolo Piquereddu, Pani, tradizione e prospettive della panificazione in Sardegna, Nuoro, Edizioni Ilisso, 2005, ISBN 88-89188-54-5.
- Laura Rangoni, La cucina sarda di mare, Edizioni Newton Compton, 2007, ISBN 88-541-0872-3.
- Bonoreddu Colomo, Cianedda Pala, Sa Cuchina sarda, Guida alla gastronomia isolana (three volumes), Editrice Archivio Fotografico Sardo, 2013.
- Costantina Frau, Alimentos Sardos in dies de festa, 70 ricette tradizionali delle antiche feste, Archivio Fotografico Sardo, 2014.
- Antonella Serrenti – Susanna Trossero, Il pane carasau. Storie e ricette di un'antica tradizione isolana, Perugia, Graphe.it edizioni, 2014, ISBN 978-88-97010-62-3.
- Guigoni A., Cibo identitario della Sardegna, ISRE, 2019.
- Piras, Claudia; Medagliani, Eugenio (2000). Culinaria Italy. Könemann Verlagsgesellschaft mbh. ISBN 3-8290-2901-2.
