= Regional Italian =

Regional varieties of the Italian language

Regional Italian (Italian: italiano regionale, pronounced [itaˈljaːno redʒoˈnaːle]) is any regional (Note: "Regional" in the broad sense of the word; not to be confused with the Italian endonym regione, for Italy's administrative units.) variety of the Italian language.

Such vernacular varieties and standard Italian exist along a sociolect continuum, and are not to be confused with the local non-immigrant languages of Italy (Note: Notwithstanding their linguistic status, most of the actual languages of Italy (with particular reference to the non-recognised ones) are called "dialects" (dialetti) by the general population.) that predate the national tongue or any regional variety thereof. Among these languages, the various Tuscan, Corsican and some Central Italian lects are, to some extent, the closest ones to standard Italian in terms of linguistic features, since the latter is based on a somewhat polished form of Florentine.

The various forms of Regional Italian have phonological, morphological, syntactic, prosodic and lexical features which originate from the underlying substrate of the original language of the locale.

== Regional Italian and the languages of Italy ==
The difference between Regional Italian and the actual languages of Italy, often imprecisely referred to as dialects, is exemplified by the following: in Venetian, the language spoken in Veneto, "we are arriving" would be translated into sémo drio rivàr, which is quite distinct from the Standard Italian stiamo arrivando. In the regional Italian of Veneto, the same expression would be stémo rivando or siamo dietro ad arrivare. The same relationship holds throughout the rest of Italy: the local version of standard Italian is usually influenced by the underlying local language, which can be very different from Italian with regard to phonology, morphology, syntax, and vocabulary. Anyone who knows Standard Italian well can usually understand Regional Italian quite well, while not managing to grasp the regional languages.

== Origin ==
Many contemporary Italian regions already had different substrates before the conquest of Italy and the islands by the ancient Romans: Northern Italy had a Ligurian, Venetic, Rhaetic and Celtic substrate in the areas once known as Cisalpine Gaul ("Gaul on this side of the Alps"); Central Italy had an Umbrian and Etruscan substrate; Southern Italy and Sicily had an Oscan and Italic-Greek substrate respectively; and finally, Sardinia had an indigenous (Nuragic) and Punic substrate. These languages in their respective territories contributed in creolising Latin, the official language of the Roman Empire.

Even though the Sicilian School, using the Sicilian language, had been prominent earlier, by the 14th century the Tuscan dialect of Florence had gained prestige once Dante Alighieri, Francesco Petrarca (Petrarch) and Giovanni Boccaccio all wrote major works in it: the Divine Comedy, the Canzoniere and the Decameron. Italian, defined as such, began to spread and be used as a literary and prestigious means of expression across the whole peninsula, Sicily and Corsica in the late Middle Ages; on the other hand, it would be introduced to Sardinia by a specific order only in the second half of the 18th century (1760), when the island's ownership passed over to the House of Savoy. It was up to Pietro Bembo, a Venetian, to identify Florentine as the language for the peninsula in the Prose nelle quali si ragiona della volgar lingua (1525), in which he set up Petrarch as the perfect model. Italian, however, was a literary language and so was a written rather than spoken language, except in Tuscany and Corsica.

The popular diffusion of a unified Italian language was the main goal of Alessandro Manzoni, who advocated for a single national language mainly derived from "cultured" Florentine language. Having lived in Paris for many years, Manzoni had noticed that French (defined as the capital's dialect) was a very lively language, spoken by ordinary people in the city's streets. On the other hand, the only Italian city where even the commoners spoke something similar to literary Italian was Florence, so he thought that Italians should choose Florentine as the basis for the national language.

The Italian Peninsula's history of fragmentation and colonization by foreign powers (especially France, Spain and the Austrian Empire) between the fall of the Western Roman Empire and its unification in 1861 played a considerable role in further jeopardizing the linguistic situation. When the unification process took place, the newly founded country used Italian mainly as a literary language. Many Romance and non-Romance regional languages were spoken throughout the Italian Peninsula and the islands, each with their own local dialects.

Italian as a spoken language was born in two "linguistic labs" consisting of the metropolitan areas in Milan and Rome, which functioned as magnets for internal migration. Immigrants were only left with the national language as a lingua franca to communicate with both the locals and other immigrants. After unification, Italian started to be taught at primary schools and its use by ordinary people increased considerably, along with mass literacy. The regional varieties of Italian, as a product of standard Italian mixing with the regional languages, were also born.

The various regional languages would be retained by the population as their normal means of expression until the 1950s, when breakthroughs in literacy and the advent of TV broadcasting made Italian become more and more widespread, usually in its regional varieties.

== Characteristics of regional Italian ==
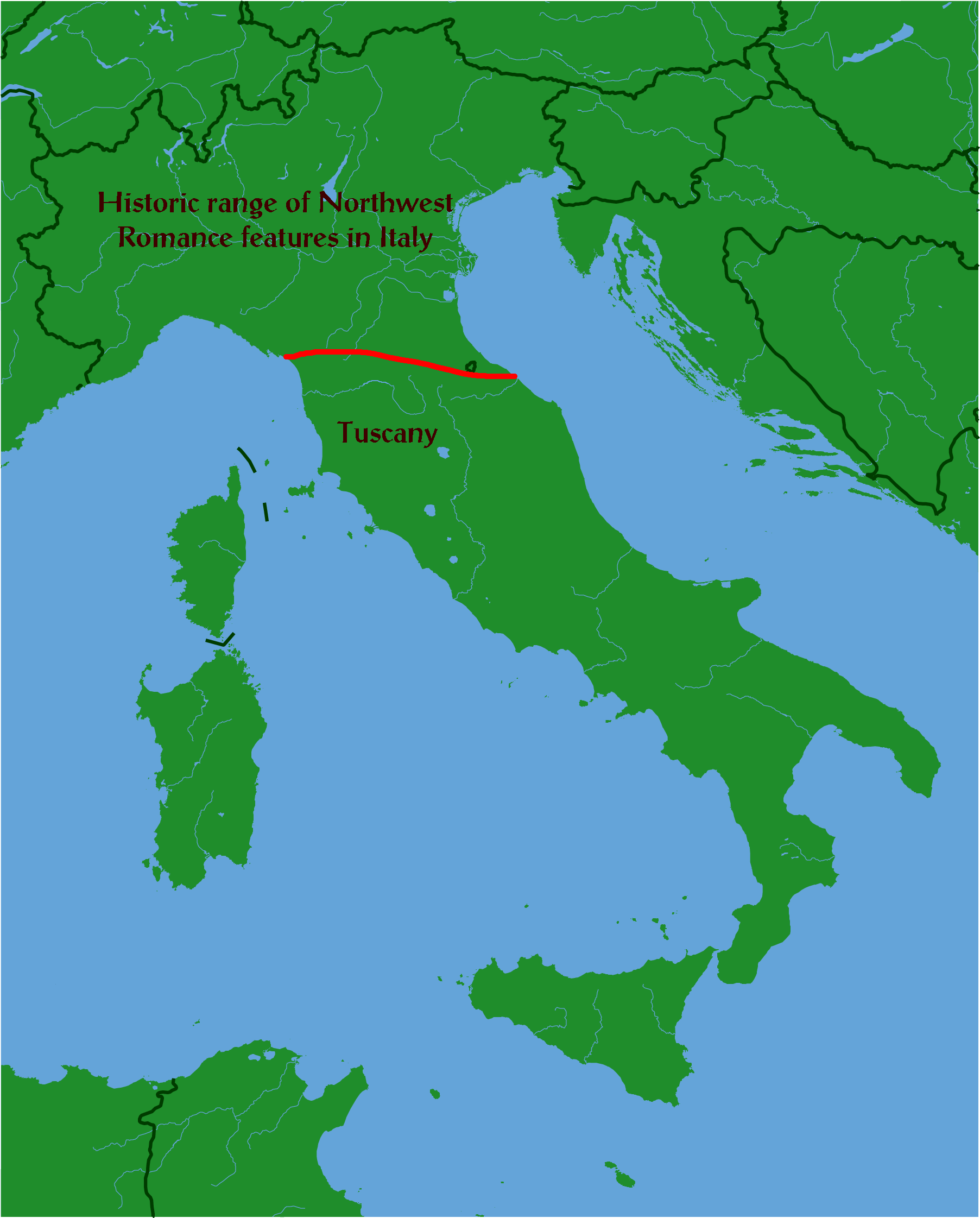
Rimini-La Spezia line

Establishing precise boundaries is very difficult in linguistics, and this operation at the limit can be accomplished for individual phenomena (such as the realization of a sound), but not for all of them: it is necessary to proceed in part by abstractions. In general, an isogloss is an imaginary line that marks the boundary of a linguistic phenomenon. The line traditionally referred to as La Spezia-Rimini (though it is currently moving to the Massa-Senigallia line) is an important isogloss for Southern Europe, which delimits a continuum of languages and dialects characterized by similar phenomena that differ from others for these same phenomena.

This imaginary line is used here to define not only a boundary between dialect groups, but also between Northern regional Italian on the one hand and Central and Southern regional Italian on the other. Other well-defined areas are the Tuscan, the Extreme Southern Italian (comprising the peninsular part of Calabria, Salento and Sicily), and finally the Sardinian ones.

Based on borders like La Spezia-Rimini, here are the most well-identified groups of regional Italian.

=== Northern Italy ===
Northern regional Italian is characterized by a different distribution of the open and closed e and o ([e, ɛ, o, ɔ]) compared to the Florentine model, particularly evident in Milan, where the open e is pronounced at the end of the word (perché [perˈkɛ]) or in a closed syllable (i.e. followed by a coda consonant: stesso [ˈstɛsso]) and the closed e in a non-final open syllable (i.e. not followed by a coda consonant: bene [ˈbeːne]). Except for the extreme Ligurian Levante, in Liguria, and especially in the capital, there is the opposite phenomenon: there is a tendency to close all the e even where the Italian standard does not exhibit it. In Genoa and Bologna for example the names Mattèo, Irène, Emanuèle and the name of the city itself are pronounced with the closed e; moreover, there is no difference in the pronunciation of the word pesca either to mean "peach" (standard [ˈpɛska]) and "fishing" (standard [ˈpeska]), both pronounced [ˈpeska].

There is also a strong tendency to pronounce all the e's before a nasal consonant as closed (usually when the nasal consonant is in the same syllable of the e) so that /ɛ/ becomes /e/. Sempre (always) is pronounced as [ˈsempre] in Northern Italy while the standard pronunciation is [ˈsɛmpre], The only exceptions being the words that end in -enne and -emme A characteristic of the North in opposition to the South is the almost always voiced ([z]) consonant in intervocalic position, whereas in the south it is always voiceless: [ˈkɔːza] vs. [ˈkɔːsa]. Also in opposition to the south, the north is characterized by the reduction of phonosyntactic doubling at the beginning of the word (after vowels) and the almost total abandonment of the preterite tense in verb forms as it is not present in the majority of Gallo-italic languages (they are replaced by the present perfect).

Sometimes, for older speakers, northern varieties lack geminated consonants (see gemination), especially in Veneto. The lack of the gemination standardly found in combinations of prepositions + articles (e.g. alla, dello, sull' etc.) is very widespread in casual speech, resulting in "sull'albero" sounding like [suˈlalbero] in contrast with the standard pronunciation [sulˈlalbero].

The consonants /ʃ, tʃ, dʒ/ are labialized in standard Italian ([ʃʷ, tʃʷ, dʒʷ]), but in northern varieties they're not.

Final N's (even though they're not usually found in words with an Italian origin) are usually pronounced as velars in northern varieties, so the typical Venetian surname "Martin" is pronounced as [marˈtiŋ] in Northern Italy but [marˈtin] in Central and Southern Italy.

In some cases, certain unstressed vowels may be pronounced more subtly or reduced in Northern Italian varieties compared to standard Italian. One example is the pronunciation of the suffix -ano for conjugating a first conjugation verb (-are) to a third plural person (they), which most of the time is phonetically realized as [-ɐno]

Widespread use of determiners before feminine names (la Giulia) is also noted in almost all the north while the determiner coupled with male names (il Carlo) is typical of the Po Valley.

In the northern vocabulary words like anguria (also common in Sardinia and Sicily), which means "watermelon", instead of cocomero, bologna for mortadella (but not everywhere), piuttosto che ("rather than") in the sense of "or" and not "instead", etc. are in use. The last, in particular, is a custom that has begun to spread also in other areas of Italy, stirring up linguistic concern, as it is used with a semantic sense in contrast to that of standard Italian.

=== Tuscany ===
In Tuscany and especially in Florence, the Tuscan gorgia is very well known. That is, the lenition of the occlusive consonants in the post-vocalic position, including at the beginning of the word if the previous word ends up by vowel: la casa "the house" [la ˈhaːsa], even to its total disappearance. Also phonological in nature are forms without the diphthong uo of Standard Italian (ova, scola, bona, foco instead of uova, scuola, buona, fuoco), while in the syntax a tripartite system of demonstrative adjectives is in use: questo ("this") to indicate something close to the speaker (first person), codesto (lost in other varieties) for something close to the contact person (second person), or quello "that" for something far from both (third person). A Tuscan stereotype is use of forms resembling the impersonal for the first person plural: (noi) si va instead of noi andiamo ("we are going"), past tense (noi) si è andati, and use of te rather than tu as second person singular subject pronoun: Te che fai stasera? rather than Tu che fai stasera? ("What are you doing tonight?"). Also typical of several areas including Tuscany is the use of the article before a female given name (la Elena, la Giulia); such use passed from Tuscany to other regions when used before the surname of well-known people, particularly of the past (il Manzoni). In the vocabulary there is the use of spenge instead of spegne ("extinguishes") or words like balocco instead of giocattolo ("toy"), busse instead of percosse or botte ("beatings"), rena instead of sabbia ("sand"), cencio instead of panno ("cloth").

The Tuscan historical dialects (including Corsican) belong to the same linguistic system as Italian, with few substantial morphological, syntactic or lexical differences compared to the standard language. As a result, unlike further from Tuscany in Italy, there are no major obstacles to mutual intelligibility of the local Romance languages and Regional Italian.

=== Central Italy, Southern Italy and Sicily ===
Central and Southern regional Italian is characterized by the usage of the affricate consonants in place of fricatives after nasal consonants (insolito [inˈtsɔːlito] instead of [inˈsɔːlito]), and by the doubling of the gs and bs (abile [ˈabbile] instead of [ˈaːbile], regina [redˈdʒiːna] instead of [reˈdʒiːna]). A popular trait in the everyday southern speech is the usage of the apocope of the final syllable of the words, (ma' for mamma "mom", professo' for professore "professor", compa' for compare "buddy, homie" etc.).

In continental Southern Italy there is a different distribution of closed and open vowels (The pronunciation "giòrno" with an open o is very widespread in Campania for example), while in Calabria, Salento and Sicily closed vowels are completely missing and speakers just pronounce open vowels ([ɛ, ɔ]), while in the other regions the discrepancies with the pronunciation Standards are minor (albeit relevant) and non-homogeneous; on the Adriatic side is more evident, as in certain areas of central-east Abruzzo (Chieti-Sulmona), largely in central-northern Apulia (Foggia-Bari-Taranto), and in eastern Basilicata (Matera) where it is present The so-called "syllabic isocronism": free syllable vowels are all pronounced closed and those in close syllables all open (see the well-known example un póco di pòllo instead of un pòco di póllo "a bit of chicken"); Even in the Teramo area (northern Abruzzo), and up to Pescara, the vowels are pronounced with a single open sound (for example dove volete andare stasera? [ˈdɔːvɛ vɔˈlɛːtɛ anˈdaːrɛ staˈsɛːra], Thus showing an inexplicable coincidence with the phonetic outcomes of Sicily and Calabria, although there is no direct link with them. As already mentioned here, the intervocalic s is always voiceless, and the use of the preterite is also frequent instead of the use of the present perfect. In continental southern Italy, from Rome down to Calabria, possessive pronouns often are placed after the noun: for example il libro mio instead of il mio libro ("my book").

Another characteristic of regional Italian varieties in central and southern Italy is deaffrication of /tʃ/ between vowels, both word-internally and across word boundaries. In almost all peninsular Italy from Tuscany to Sicily luce is pronounced [ˈluːʃe] rather than [ˈluːtʃe], la cena is pronounced [la ˈʃeːna] instead of [la ˈtʃeːna] as it is pronounced in northern Italy and in standard Italian.

=== Sardinia ===
Based on the significant linguistic distance between the Sardinian language (and any other traditionally spoken by the islanders) and Italian, the Sardinian-influenced Italian emerging from the contact between such languages is to be considered an ethnolect and sociolect of its own, as features divergent from Italian are local in origin, not attributable to more widespread Northern or Southern Italian varieties. While Sardinian phonetics and the introduction of Sardinian words in a full Italian conversation are prevalent, especially if they are Italianised in the process (e.g. tzurpu "blind" and scimpru "dumb" becoming ciurpo and scimpro), the regional Sardinian variety of Italian embracing the most diverging syntactic and morphological changes is situated at the low end of the diastratic spectrum, and its usage, though relatively common among the less educated, is not positively valued by either bilingual Sardinian speakers, who regard it as neither Sardinian nor Italian and nickname it italianu porcheddìnu ("piggy Italian", standing for "broken Italian"), or Italian monolinguals from Sardinia and other parts of the country.

Sardinianised Italian is marked by the prevalence, even in common speech, of the verb's inversion, following rules of Sardinian (and Latin) but not Italian, which uses a subject-verb-object structure. The (often auxiliary) verb usually ends up at the end of the sentence, especially in exclamatory and interrogative sentences (e.g. Uscendo stai?, literally "Going out are you?", from the Sardinian Essinde ses?, instead of Stai uscendo?; Studiando stavo! "Been studying have I!", from Istudiende fia!, instead of Stavo studiando!; Legna vi serve? "In need of some wood are you?" from Linna bos serbit?, instead of Avete bisogno di un po' di legna?). It is also common for interrogative sentences to use a pleonastic tutto "all", from the Sardinian totu, as in Cosa tutto hai visto? "What all have you seen?" from Ite totu as bidu? compared with the standard Italian Cosa hai visto?. The present continuous makes use of the verb essere "to be" as in English rather than stare (e.g. Sempre andando e venendo è! "Always walking up and down she/he is!" from Semper/Sempri andande e beninde est! compared with the standard Italian Sta sempre andando e venendo!): that is because the present continuous built with verb stare does not, in such regional variety, express the idea of an action ongoing at a certain point, but rather something that will take place in the very near future, almost on the point of happening (e.g. Sto andando a scuola with the meaning of "I'm about to go to school" rather than "Right now as we speak, I'm going to school"). It is also common to use antiphrastic formulas which are alien to Italian, by means of the particle già (Sard. jai / giai) which is similar to the German use of ja... schon especially for ironic purposes, in order to convey sardonic remarks (e.g. Già sei tutto studiato, tu! "You're so well educated!" from Jai ses totu istudiatu, tue! which roughly stands for "You are so ignorant and full of yourself!", or Già è poco bello! "He/It is not so beautiful!" from Jai est pacu bellu! meaning actually "He/It is so beautiful!"). One also needs to take into consideration the presence of a number of other Sardinian-specific idiomatic phrases being literally translated into Italian (like Cosa sembra? "What does it look like?" from Ite paret? meaning "How do you do?" compared to the standard Italian Come stai?, Mi dice sempre cosa! "She/He's always scolding me!" from the Sardinian Semper cosa mi narat! compared to the standard Italian Mi rimprovera sempre!, or again Non fa! "No chance!" from Non fachet! / Non fait! compared to standard Italian Non si può!), that would make little sense to an Italian speaker from another region.

As mentioned earlier, a significant number of Sardinian and other local loanwords (be they Italianised or not) are also present in regional varieties of Italian (e.g. porcetto from the Sardinian porcheddu / porceddu, scacciacqua from the Sardinian parabba / paracua "raincoat", continente "Mainland" and continentale "Mainlander" with reference to the rest of the country and its people as well, etc.).

Some words may even reflect ignorance of the original language on the speaker's part when referring to a singular noun in Italian with Sardinian plurals, due to a lack of understanding of how singular and plurals nouns are formed in Sardinian: common mistakes are "una seadas", "un tenores", etc.

Regarding phonology, the regional Italian spoken in Sardinia follows the same five-vowel system of the Sardinian language without length differentiation, rather than the standard Italian seven-vowel system. Metaphony has also been observed: tonic e and o ([e, o]) have a closed sound whenever they are followed by a closed vowel (i, u), and they have it open if they are followed by an open one (a, e, o). Hypercorrection is also common when applying the Italian rule of syntactic gemination; intervocalic t, p, v, c are usually elongated. Intervocalic /s/ voicing is the same as in Northern Italy, that is [z].

== See also ==
- Italian language
- Languages of Italy
- Standard language

== Bibliography ==
- Avolio, Francesco: Lingue e dialetti d'Italia, Rome: Carocci, 2009.
- Berruto, Gaetano: Sociolinguistica dell'italiano contemporaneo, Rome: Carocci, 2012.
- Bruni, Francesco: L'italiano nelle regioni, Turin: UTET, 1992.
- Canepari. Luciano. 1983. Italiano standard a pronunce regionali. Padova: CLEUP.
- Cardinaletti, Anna and Nicola Munaro, eds.: Italiano, italiani regionali e dialetti, Milan: Franco Angeli, 2009.
- Comrie, Bernard, Matthews, Stephen and Polinsky, Maria: The Atlas of Languages: The Origin and Development of Languages Throughout the World. Rev. ed., New York 2003.
- Cortelazzo, Manlio and Carla Marcato, Dizionario etimologico dei dialetti italiani, Turin: UTET libreria, 2005, ISBN 88-7750-039-5.
- Devoto, Giacomo and Gabriella Giacomelli: I dialetti delle regioni d'Italia, Florence: Sansoni Editore, 1971 (3rd edition, Tascabili Bompiani, 2002).
- Grassi, Corrado, Alberto A. Sobrero and Tullio Telmon: Fondamenti di dialettologia italiana, Bari: Laterza, 2012.
- Grimes, Barbara F. (ed.): Ethnologue: Languages of the World. Vol. 1, 2000.
- Hall, Robert A. Jr.: External History of the Romance Languages, New York: Elsevier, 1974.
- Haller, Hermann W.: The Hidden Italy: A Bilingual Edition of Italian Dialect Poetry, Detroit: Wayne State University Press, 1986.
- Loporcaro, Michele: Profilo linguistico dei dialetti italiani, Bari: Laterza, 2009.
- Maiden, Martin and Parry, Mair, eds.: The Dialects of Italy, London: Routledge, 1997.
- Maiden, Martin: A Linguistic History of Italian, London: Longman, 1995.
- Marcato, Carla: Dialetto, dialetti e italiano, Bologna: il Mulino, 2002.
- Rognoni, Andrea: Grammatica dei dialetti della Lombardia, Oscar Mondadori, 2005.
