= Filindeu =

Pasta from the Barbagia region of Sardinia

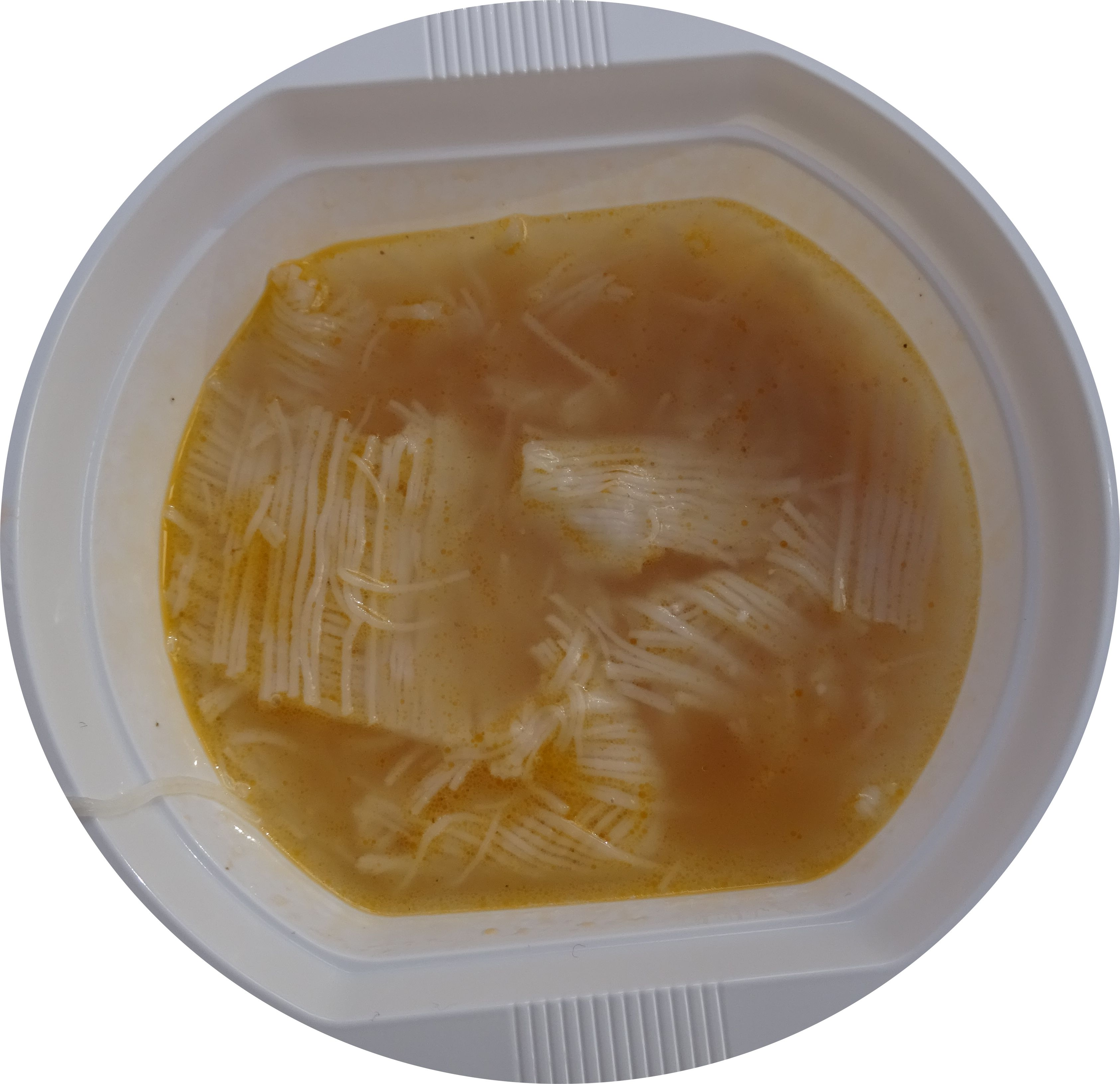
Filindeu in broth

Filindeu (Sardinian: su filindeu) is a rare type of pasta from the Barbagia region of Sardinia. It is made by pulling and folding semolina dough into very thin threads, which are laid in three layers on a tray called a fundu and dried to form textile-like sheets. The dried sheets are then broken into pieces and served in a mutton broth with pecorino sardo cheese. Filindeu is listed on the Ark of Taste.

== History ==
In the 17th century, a Nuorese person accused of banditry built a small church in Lula as an ex voto to Saint Francis of Assisi for having been cleared of all charges against him. For centuries since, on the nights of May 1 and October 4 (the feast day of Saint Francis in the General Roman Calendar), pilgrims have travelled there on foot from the Church of Our Lady of the Rosary in Nuoro. After a walk of several miles, the priors offer arriving pilgrims a dish of the filindeu and mutton soup.

The recipe and making of the pasta for the soup, which is exclusively done by hand, is passed from generation to generation by the women of Lula. In 2016, it was noted that there were only ten women who knew how to make the pasta. In 2026, the figure was reported as a "handful."

== See also ==
- Cuisine of Sardinia
