= Malloreddus =

Sardinian variety of pasta

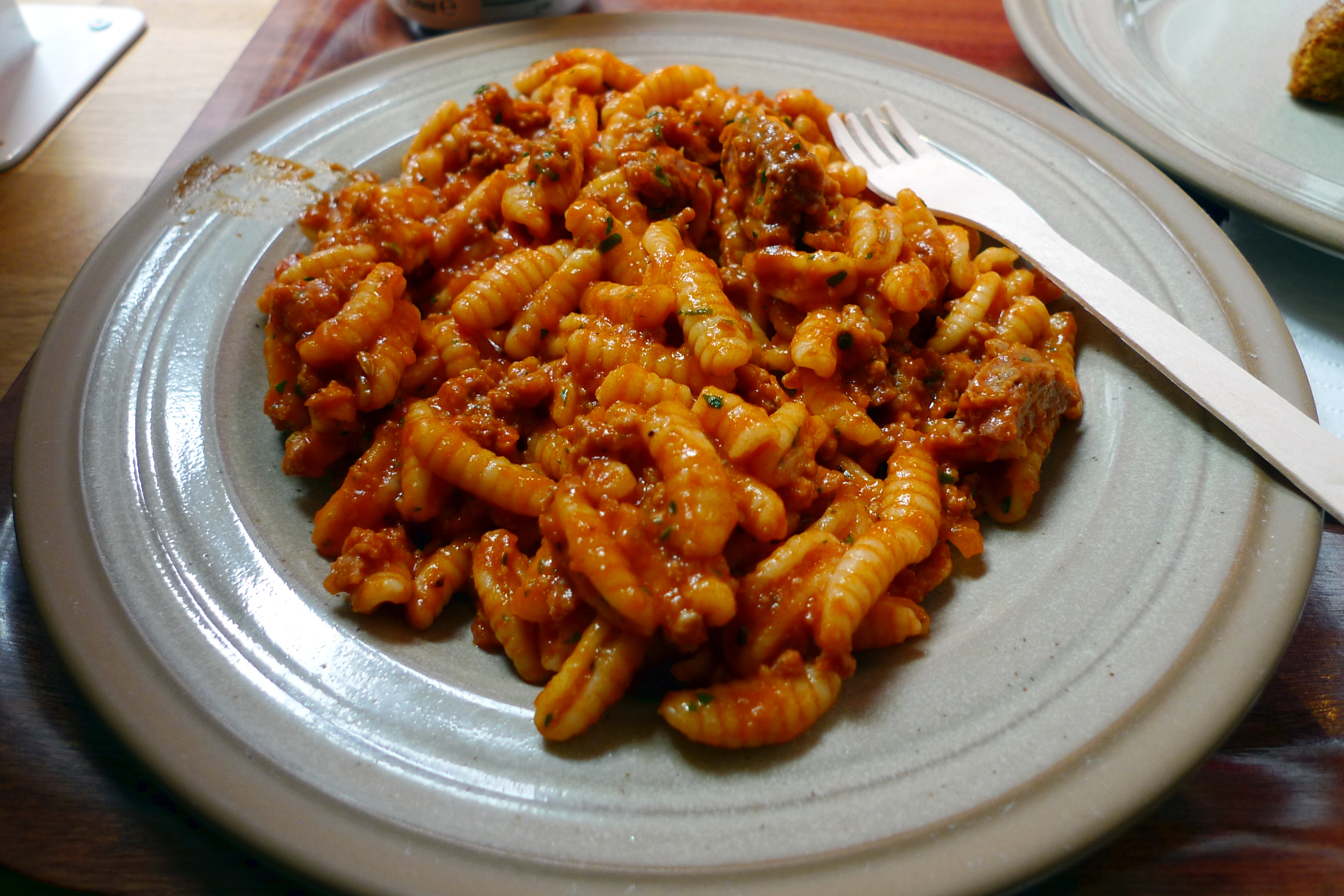
- Type: Pasta
- Place of origin: Italy
- Region or state: Sardinia

Malloreddus, sometimes Italianized as gnocchetti sardi, are a type of pasta typical of Sardinian cuisine. They have the shape of thin ribbed shells, about 2 cm (0.79 in) long, and are made of semolina flour and water.

Malloreddus are typical of the area of Medio Campidano (province of South Sardinia), but correspond to equivalent types of pasta, made with similar techniques, but in smaller sizes, in other parts of Sardinia and also known as macarrones de punzu, cigiones, macarones caidos and cravaos.

Cassulli from Carloforte (of Ligurian origin) can be reminiscent of malloreddus. Cassulli, in Sardinia, are found in the archipelago of Sulcis.

== Etymology ==
The term malloreddu (pl.: malloreddus) could derive from the Latin mallolus, which means 'trunk of dough', dumpling. A second possible etymology would make the name derive from a diminutive of the word malloru, which in Sardinian campidanese (southern and central-southern Sardinia) means 'bull'. Consequently, malloreddus means 'little calves'.

== History ==
Malloreddus have always been the most prepared traditional dish in Sardinia in all the most important occasions, both in festivals and village fairs, and during weddings. Since ancient times housewives have prepared this type of pasta. The origin is to be found in the millenary scheme of the peasant cultivation-alimentation in the Mediterranean area, mainly based on the cultivation of wheat.

The manual processing of malloreddus in the home was done by mixing durum wheat semolina with water, and rolled up strips of pasta about 15 cm (5.9 in) long, which were cut into cubes. Then the shape was obtained by pressing the cubes of dough against the end of a straw basket, called su ciuliri ('the sieve') in order to get them striped, or to have them smooth it was enough to simply press them against a wooden base. The result was a pot-bellied product that in the imagination of the agro-pastoral world took the form of small calves.

== Dishes with malloreddus ==
According to Vincenzo Buonassisi malloreddus are generally served with a meat sauce and can be made with saffron included in the dough. He also features meatless recipes of Malloreddus al burro e pecorino (Malloreddus with butter and pecorino) and Malloreddus al pecorino e pomodoro (Malloreddus with pecorino and tomatoes).

The classic dish of Sardinian cuisine is malloreddus alla campidanese. In this dish, a ragù is made by cutting Sardinian sausage into small pieces; the pieces are fried in oil with chopped onion, then boiled for about an hour with tomato sauce; a few strands of saffron are then added, ten minutes before the end of cooking. The boiled gnocchetti are seasoned with this sauce and grated pecorino sardo cheese. Originally saffron was used directly in the dough of malloreddus, now instead it is added at the end together with the sauce.

== See also ==
- List of pasta
