= Fregula =

Type of pasta from Sardinia

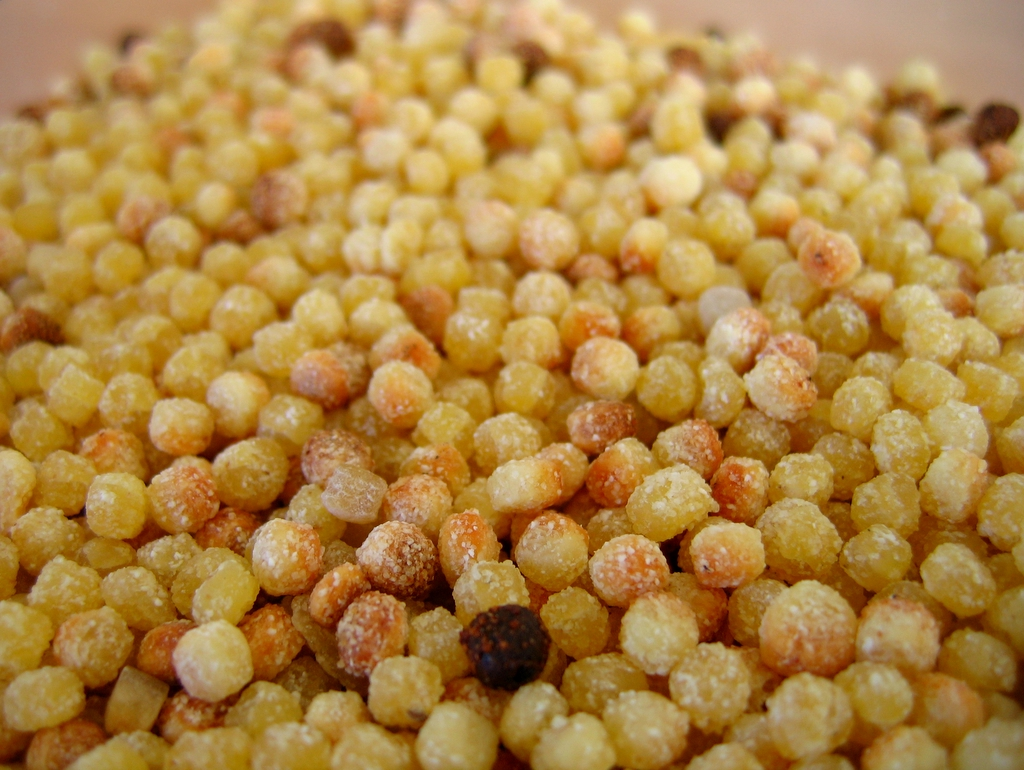
- Uncooked fregula
- Type: Pasta
- Place of origin: Sardinia
- Main ingredients: Semolina dough

Fregula (often written fregola) is a type of semolina pasta from the Sardinia region of Italy.

== Description ==
The first references to fregula date back to the 14th century. It is produced in varying sizes but typically consists of semolina dough that has been rolled into balls 2–3 mm in diameter and toasted in an oven. It is similar to acini di pepe and couscous though the physical form of the pasta is closer to maftoul as well as moghrabieh. As it dates back to the 14th century, it is currently unknown if the method was derived from North African couscous recipes brought to Sardinia by immigrants or if it was developed independently.

A typical preparation of fregula is to simmer it in a tomato-based sauce with clams.

== See also ==
- Cuisine of Sardinia
- List of pasta
- Orzo
