= Pane fratau =

Sardinian dish

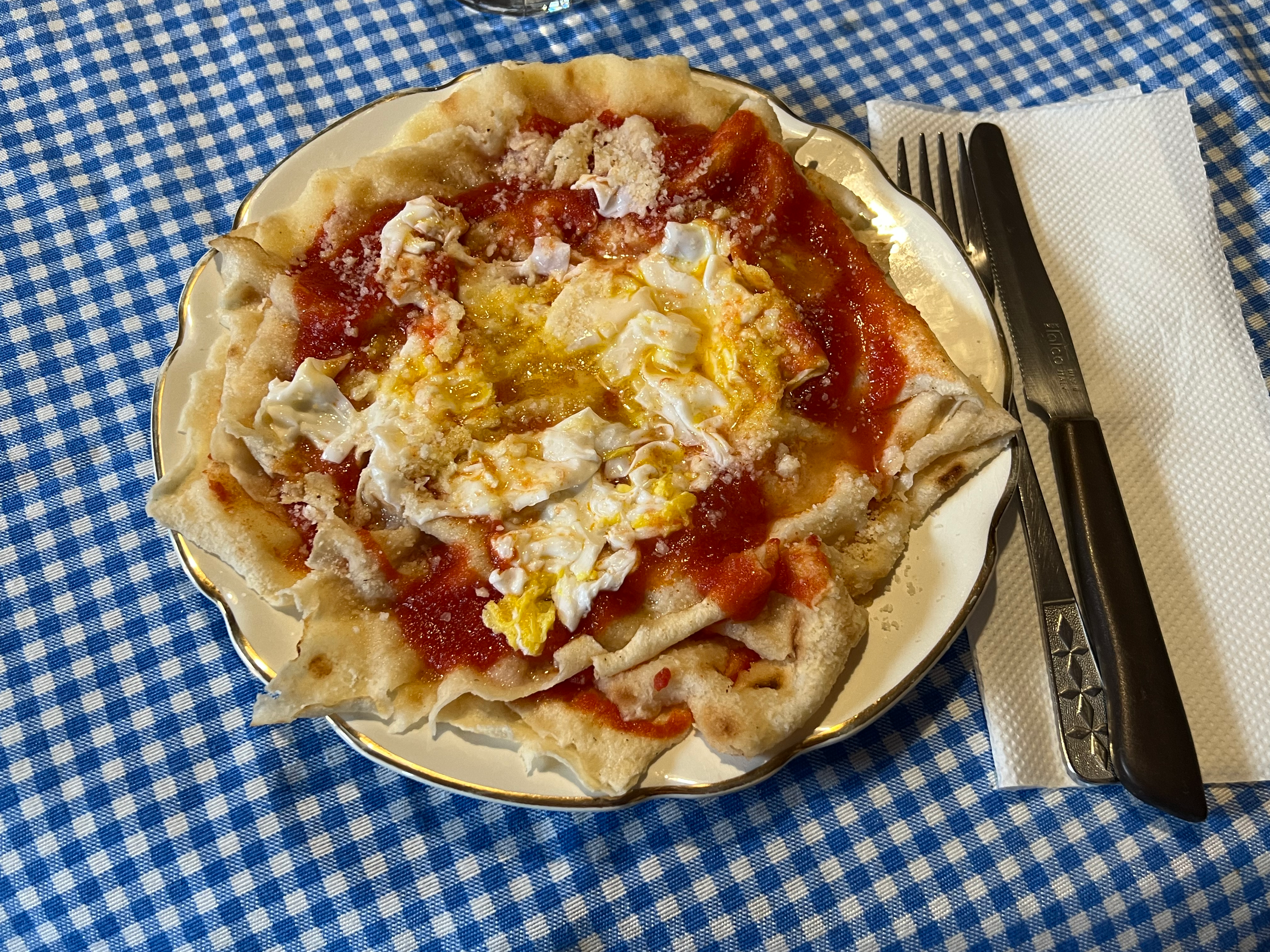
- Place of origin: Italy
- Region or state: Barbagia, Sardinia
- Main ingredients: Pane carasau, tomato, pecorino, egg, olive oil

Pane fratau (often transcribed with the misspelling of the double T, frattau) is a traditional dish from the region of Barbagia, in the central part of the Italian island of Sardinia. The name in Sardinian language literally means 'shredded bread', in reference to the main ingredient being shards of pane carasau, the crispbread commonly consumed by shepherds in the region. Originally a frugal food part of the island's rural tradition, the dish has been later popularized, becoming a staple in the island.

== Origin ==
According to a legend, the dish was invented by two women in occasion of the visit to the island of king Umberto I of Italy. In reality, food preparations based on bread or bread crumbs soaked in water combined with oil, eggs, or cheese are documented since ancient Rome and through the Middle Ages. In Sardinia, pane carasau was carried by farmers and shepherds in a bag and consumed during the day, and the dish was a traditional way to consume shreds of the bread that would remain inside the bag. In the 19th century, pane fratau is mentioned by Grazia Deledda in her writings.

== Preparation ==
The dish consists of alternating layers of pane carasau (usually soaked in water, broth or tomato sauce), topped with grated pecorino cheese and poached egg. The yolk of the egg should be liquid, and it is typically spread over the top of the bread before consuming it.

== See also ==
- Pane carasau
