= Pane carasau =

Thin, crisp flatbread from Sardinia

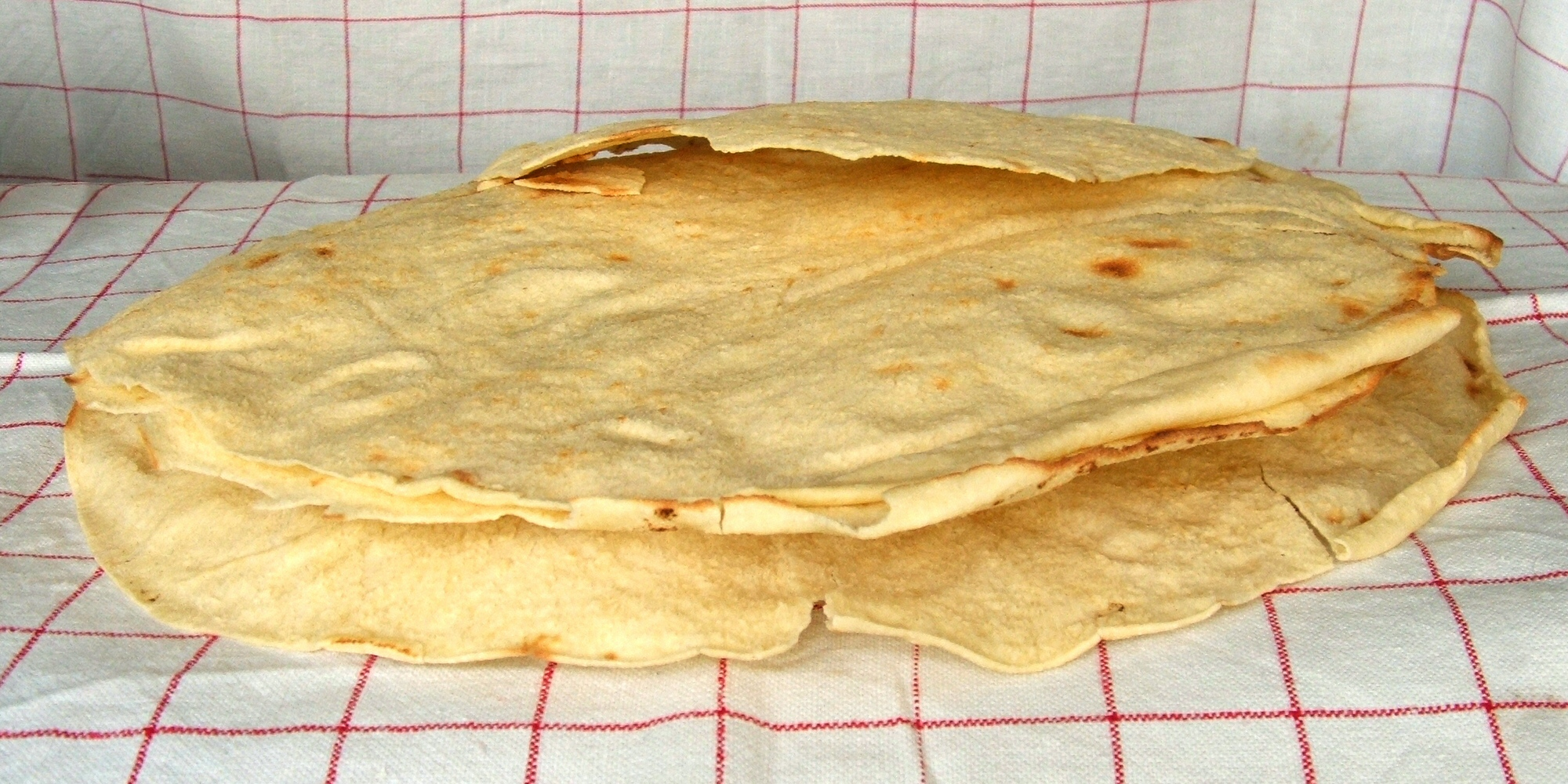
- Type: Flatbread
- Place of origin: Italy
- Region or state: Sardinia
- Main ingredients: Durum wheat flour, salt, yeast, water

Pane carasau (Sardinian: [ˈpanɛ ɣaɾaˈzau]; Italian: [ˈpaːne karaˈza.u]; 'toasted bread' in Sardinian, from the past participle of the verb carasare, which means 'to toast') is a traditional flatbread from Sardinia. It is called carta da musica in Italian, meaning 'sheet music', in reference to its large and paper-thin shape, which is said to be so thin before cooking that a sheet of music can be read through it. It is typically paired with pecorino cheese and wine.

The bread is thin and crisp, usually in the form of a dish half a meter wide. It is made by taking baked flat bread (made of durum wheat flour, salt, yeast, and water), then separating it into two sheets which are baked again. The recipe is very ancient and was conceived for shepherds, who used to stay far from home for months at a time: pane carasau can last up to one year if it is kept dry. The bread can be eaten either dry or wet (with water, wine, or sauces). A similar, yeast-free bread, with added seasoning, is known as pane guttiau ('dripped bread').

Remains of the bread were found in archeological excavations of nuraghes (traditional Sardinian stone buildings) and it was therefore already eaten on the island prior to 1000 BCE.

Pane carasau is the main ingredient of pane fratau, a traditional dish from the central part of Sardinia.

== See also ==
- Pane fratau
