= Seada =

Sardinian savoury dessert

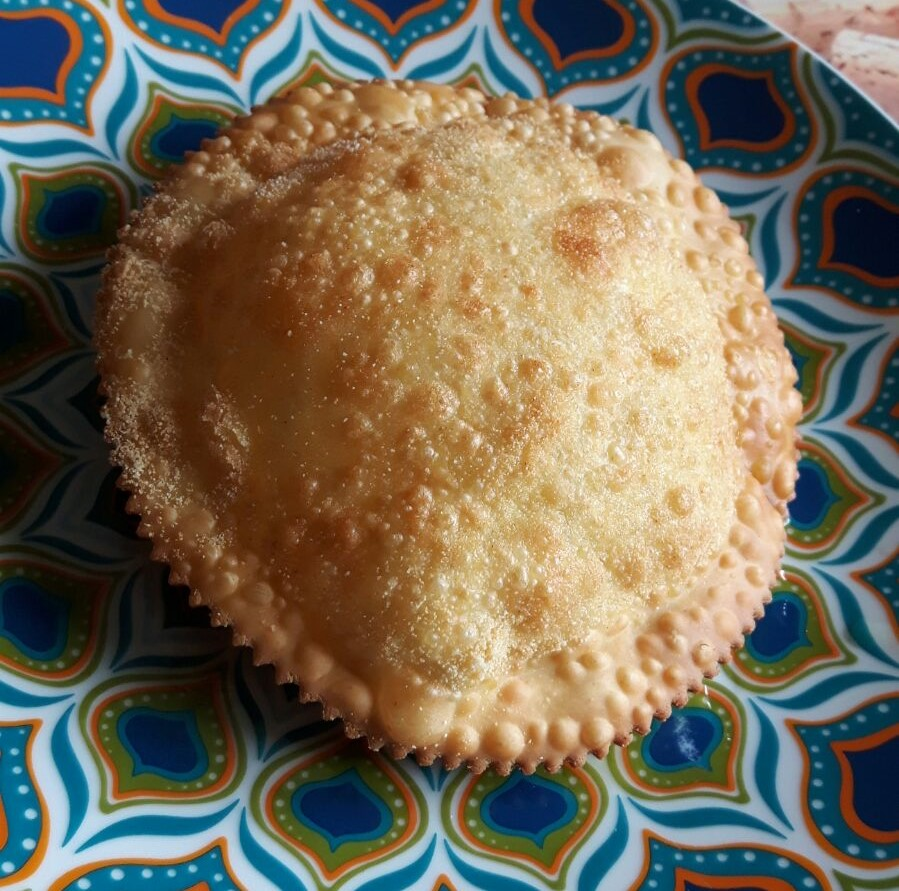
- Course: Dessert
- Place of origin: Sardinia, Italy
- Main ingredients: Semolina, lard, pecorino sardo, olive oil, honey or sugar

Seada (more commonly known by its plural form, seadas) is a Sardinian savoury dessert which can be served with sweet toppings. It is prepared by deep-frying a large semolina and lard dumpling (usually between 8 and 10 cm in diameter) with a filling of soured pecorino sardo and lemon peel in olive oil, and is served covered with honey, sugar and, sometimes, salt.
