= List of Italian foods and drinks =

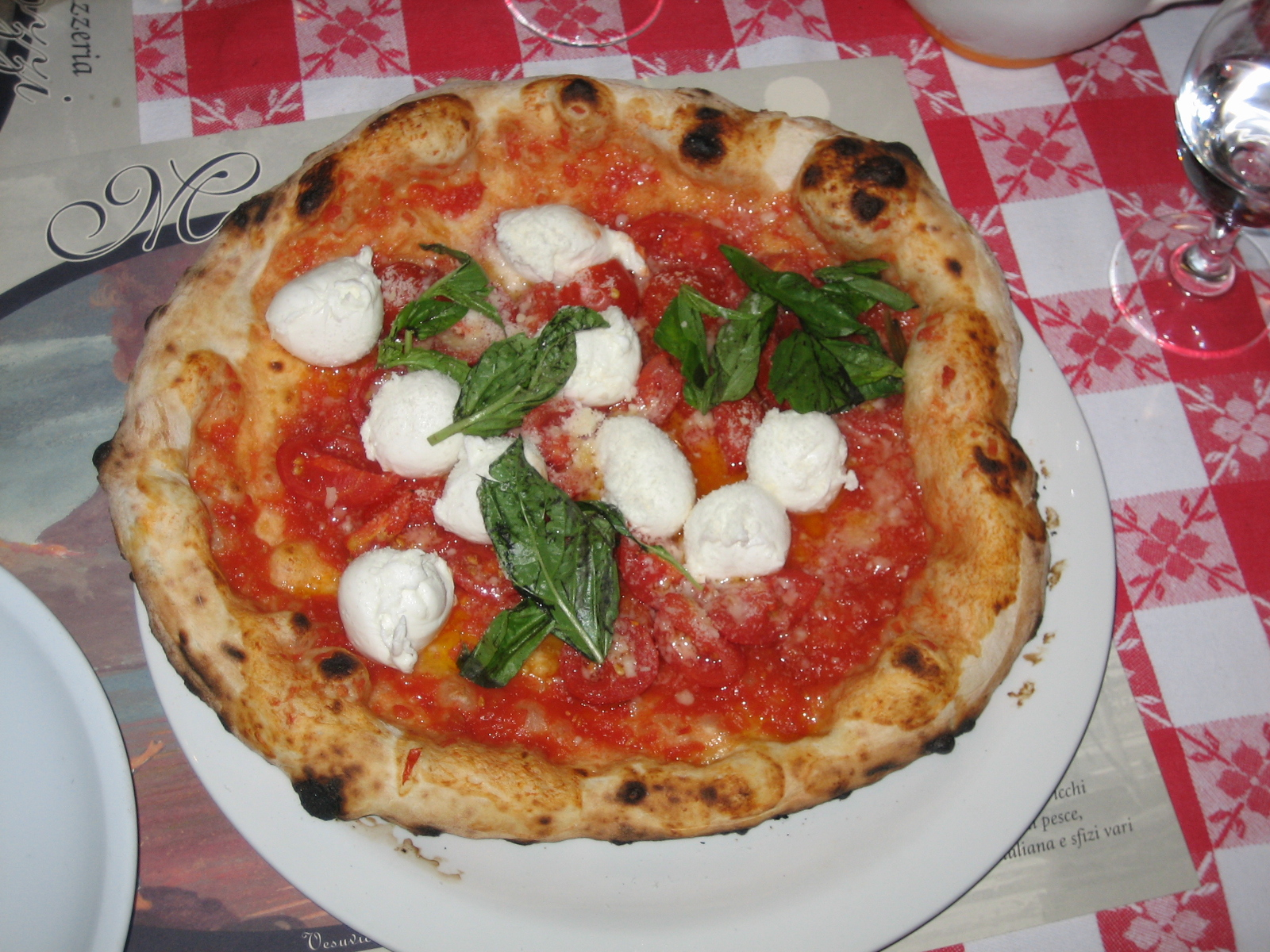
The ingredients of traditional pizza Margherita—tomatoes (red), mozzarella (white) and basil (green)—are held by popular legend to be inspired by the colours of the national flag of Italy.

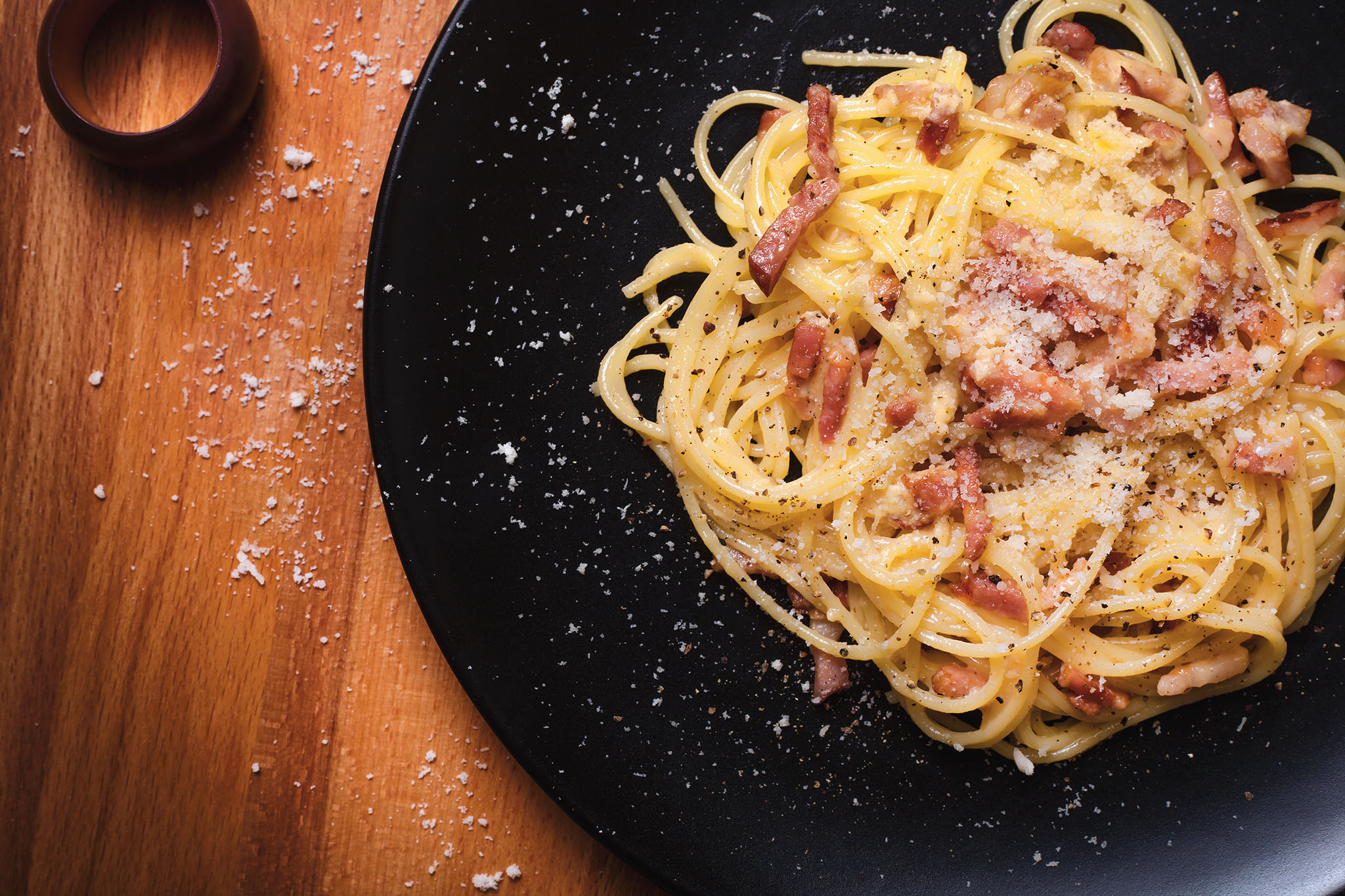
Spaghetti alla carbonara

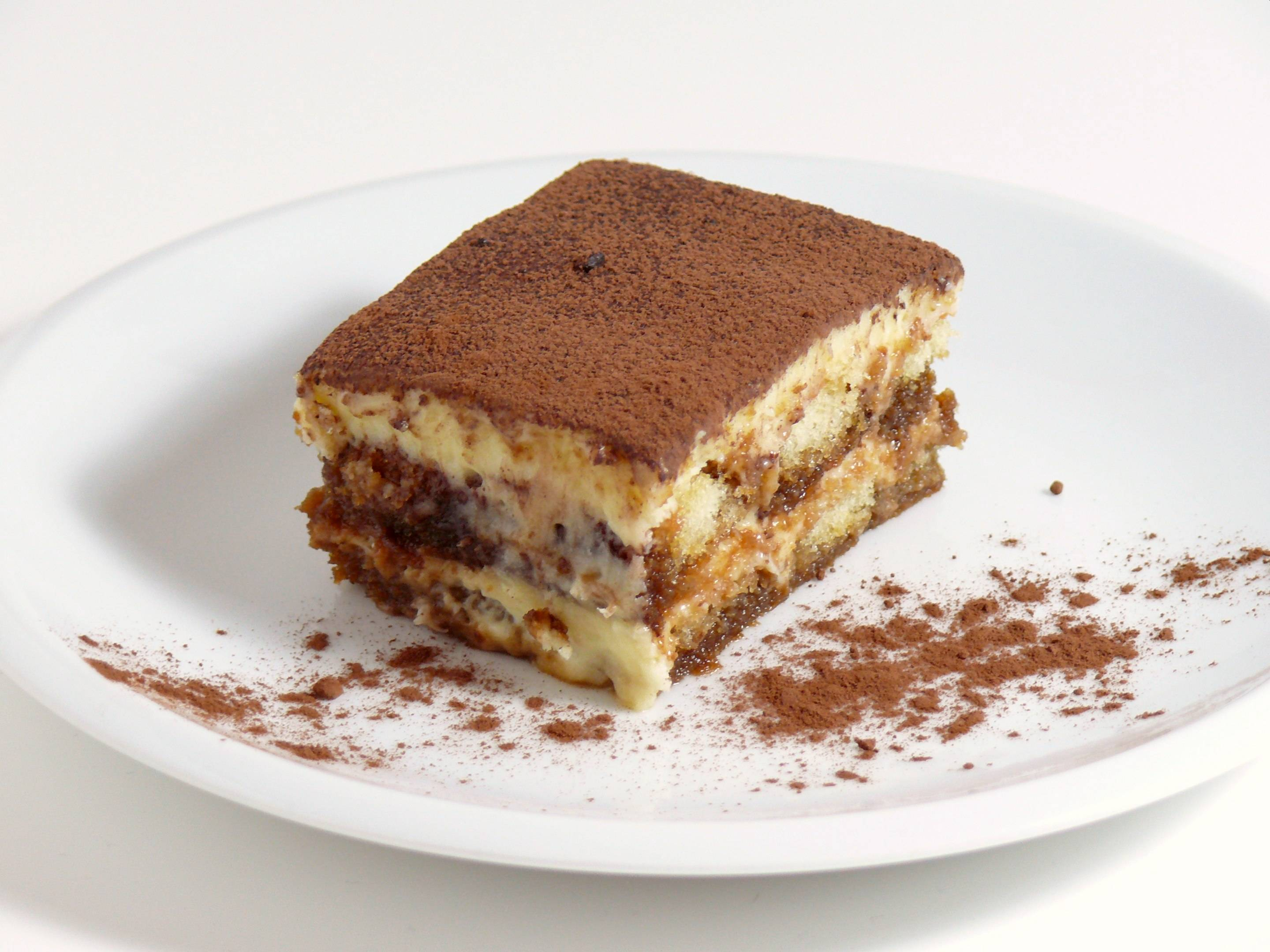
Tiramisu is an Italian dessert.

Italian cuisine has developed through centuries of social and political changes, with roots as far back as the 4th century BC. Italian cuisine has its origins in Etruscan, ancient Greek and ancient Roman cuisines. Significant changes occurred with the discovery of the New World and the introduction of potatoes, tomatoes, bell peppers and maize, now central to the cuisine, but not introduced in quantity until the 18th century.

Italian cuisine includes deeply rooted traditions common to the whole country, as well as all the regional gastronomies, different from each other, especially between the north, the centre, and the south of Italy, which are in continuous exchange. Many dishes that were once regional have proliferated with variations throughout the country. Italian cuisine offers an abundance of taste, and is one of the most popular and copied around the world. The most popular dishes and recipes, over the centuries, have often been created by ordinary people more so than by chefs, which is why many Italian recipes are suitable for home and daily cooking, respecting regional specificities.

As of 2026, Italy contains 394 Michelin star-rated restaurants. The Mediterranean diet forms the basis of Italian cuisine, rich in pasta, fish, fruits and vegetables. Cheese, cold cuts and wine are central to Italian cuisine, and along with pizza and coffee (especially espresso) form part of Italian gastronomic culture. Desserts have a long tradition of merging local flavours such as citrus fruits, pistachio and almonds with sweet cheeses such as mascarpone and ricotta or exotic tastes such as cocoa, vanilla and cinnamon. Gelato, tiramisu, and cassata are among the most famous examples of Italian desserts, cakes and patisserie. Italian cuisine relies heavily on traditional products; the country has a large number of traditional specialities protected under EU law. Italy is the world's largest producer of wine, as well as the country with the widest variety of indigenous grapevine varieties in the world.

== Foods and drinks ==
=== Soups, sauces and condiments ===
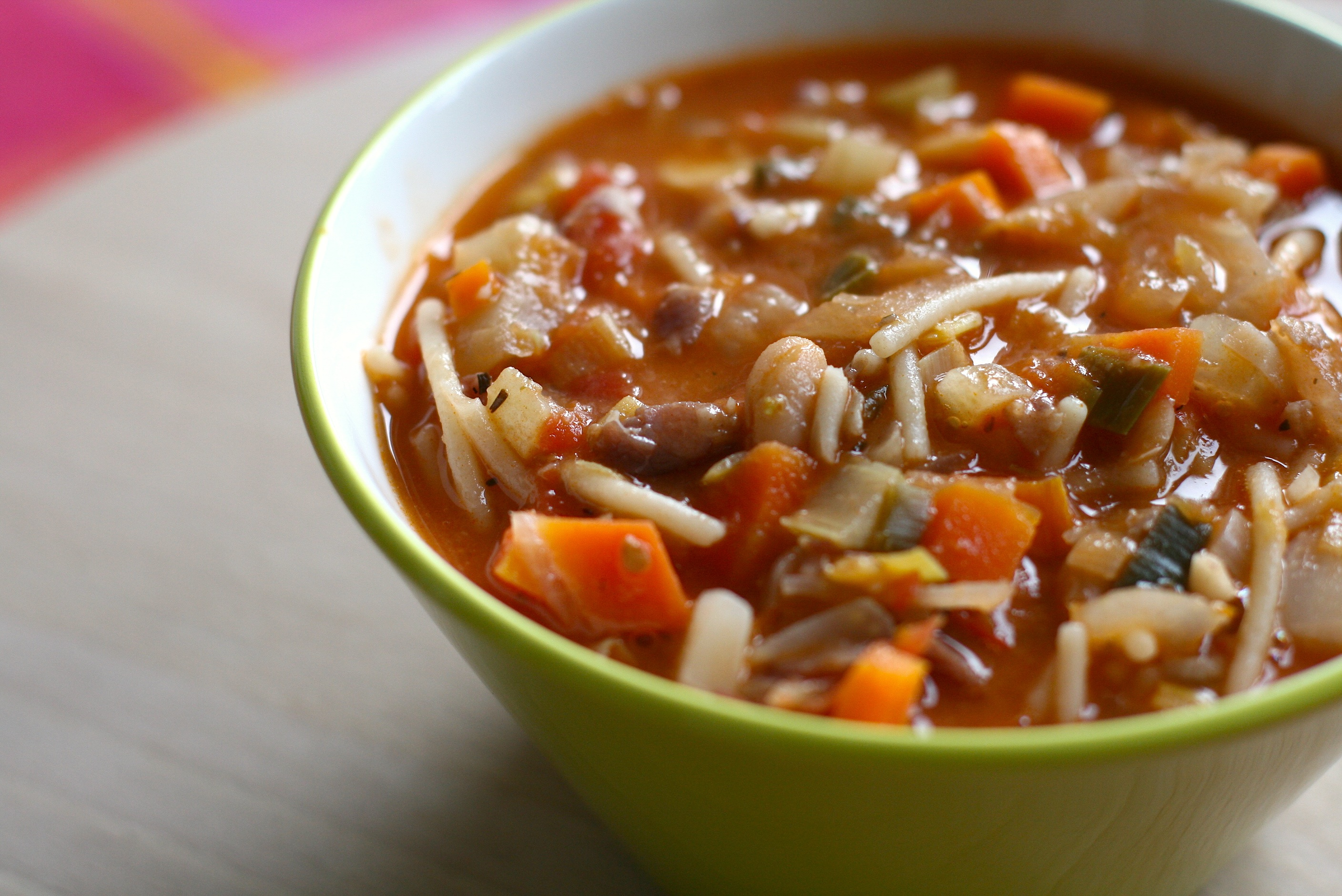
Minestrone

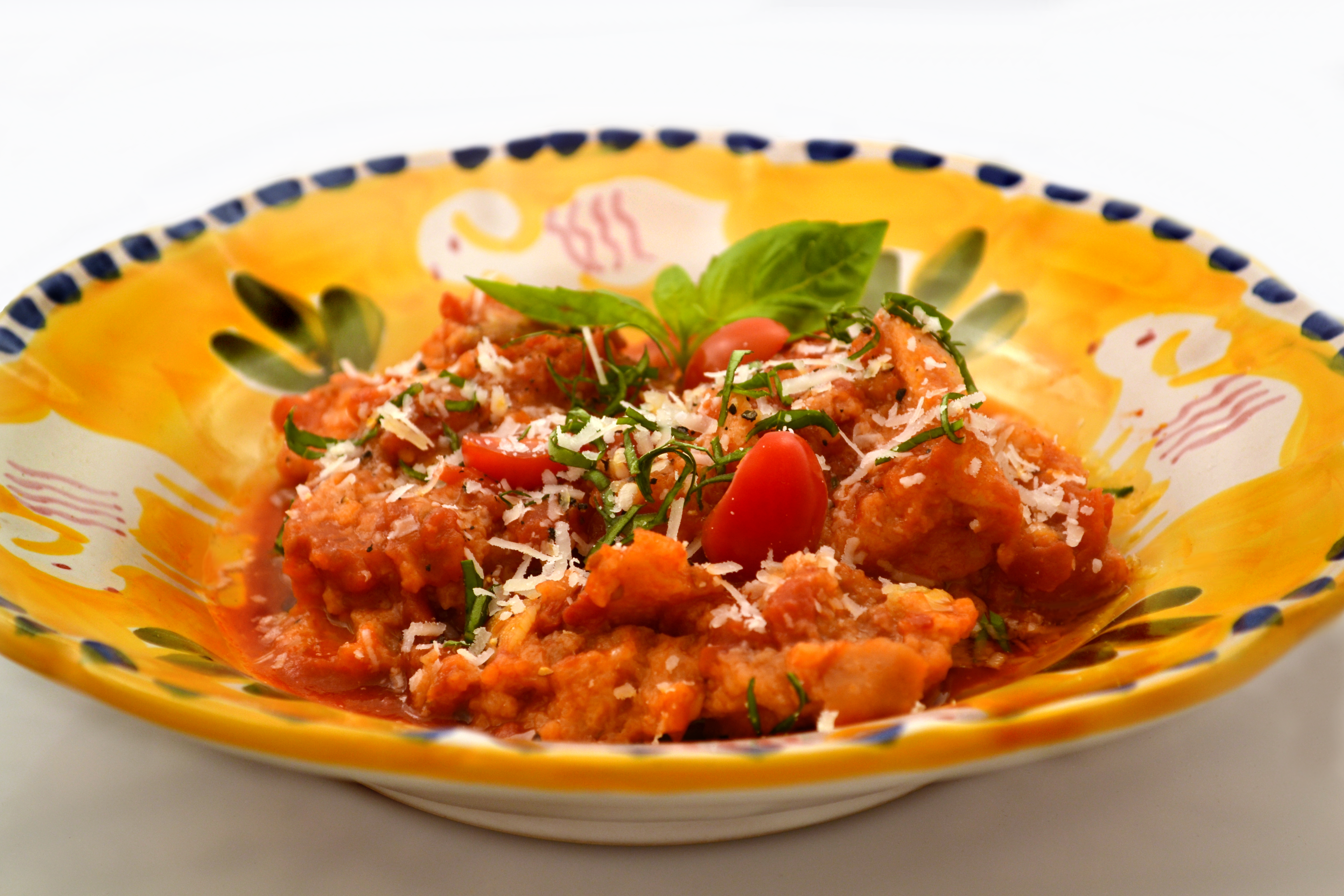
Pappa al pomodoro

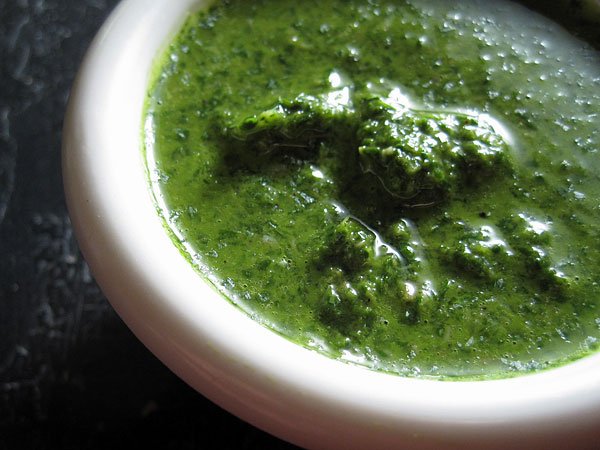
Salsa verde

- Acquacotta
- Agliata
- Agrodolce
- Alla marinara
- Amatriciana
- Arrabbiata
- Bagnet ross
- Bagnet verd
- Bagnun
- Bomba calabrese (chili spread)
- Brodetto, brodetto alla sambenedettese, brodetto alla vastese, brodetto di Porto Recanati
- Brodo di carne, brodo di pollo, brodo di quarta
- Brovada
- Buridda
- Capuliato
- Colatura di alici
- Elioconcentrato
- Garmugia
- Ghiotta (also called ghiotta di pesce and zuppa di pesce alla trapanese)
- Ginestrata
- Gremolada
- Jota
- Maccu
- Mescciüa
- Minestra di ceci, minestra di fagioli, minestra di patate, minestra maritata
- Minestrone, minestrina (or pastina in brodo)
- Mostarda (sometimes also called mostarda di frutta), mostarda vicentina
- 'Ndruppeche (or ragù potentino)
- Panada
- Pancotto
- Paparele in brodo
- Pappa al pomodoro
- Passato di verdure
- Pasta d'acciughe
- Pasta e fagioli
- Pearà
- Pesto alla calabrese, pesto alla genovese, pesto alla trapanese, pesto di fave (or marò), pesto di pistacchi, pesto modenese
- Pevarada
- Quatara di Porto Cesareo
- Ragù, ragù alla barese, ragù alla bolognese (lit. 'Bolognese sauce'), ragù d'anatra, ragù di castrato, ragù di cinghiale, ragù di coniglio, ragù di lepre, ragù di salsiccia, ragù napoletano (lit. 'Neapolitan ragù')
- Ribollita
- Salsa tonnata, salsa verde
- Sciusceddu
- Stracciatella (soup)
- Sugo alla genovese (lit. 'Genovese sauce'), sugo alle vongole, sugo finto
- Zuppa alla modenese, zuppa alla valpellinese, zuppa del canavese, zuppa di cavolo nero, zuppa di cavolo verza, zuppa di cozze, zuppa di cozze alla tarantina, zuppa di cozze e arselle, zuppa di farro, zuppa d'orzo, zuppa frantoiana, zuppa gallurese (or suppa cuata), zuppa mitonata, zuppa pavese, zuppa toscana (or minestra di pane)

=== Creams ===
- Crema di pistacchio (or pasta di pistacchio)

=== Bread ===
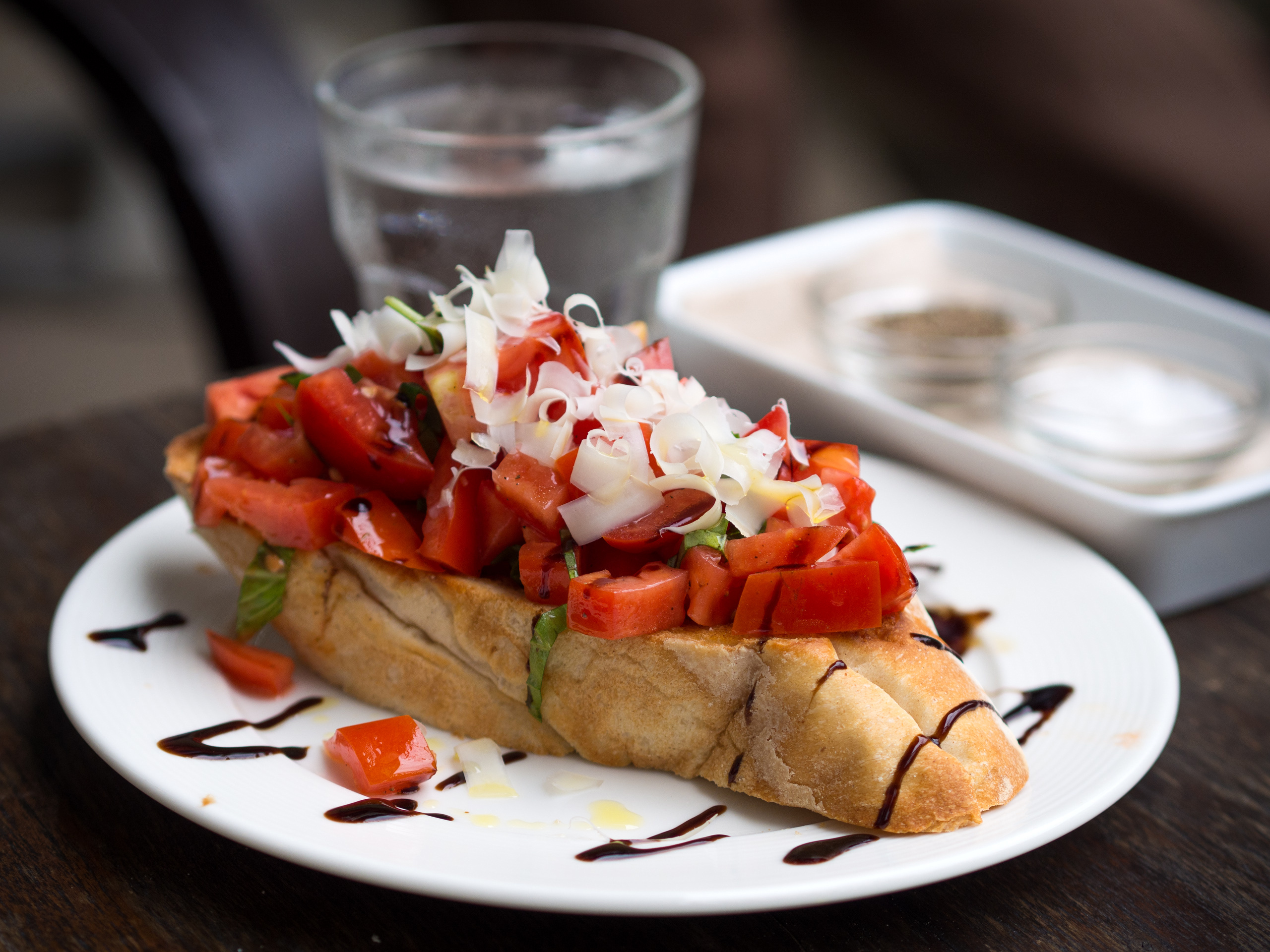
Bruschetta

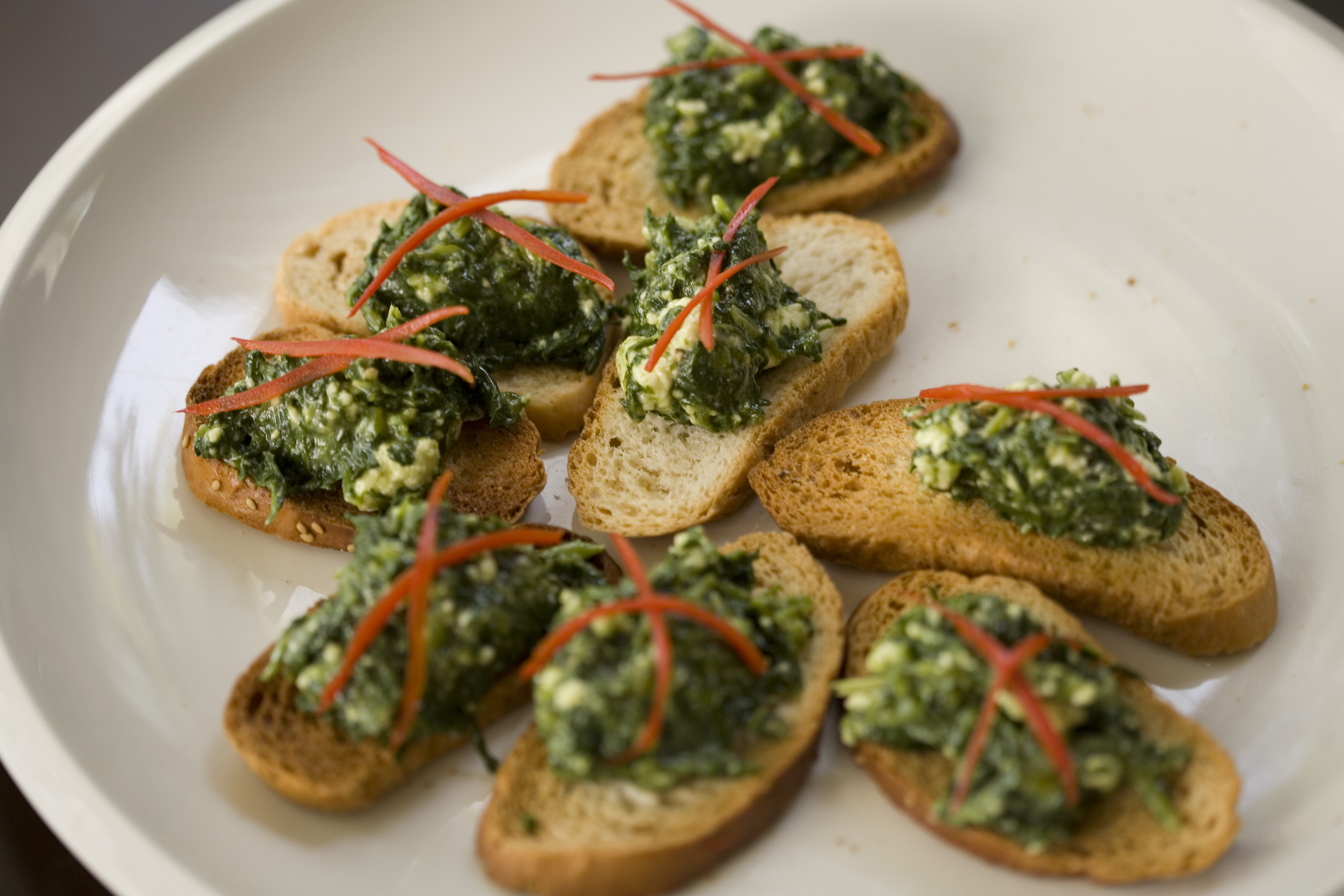
Crostini

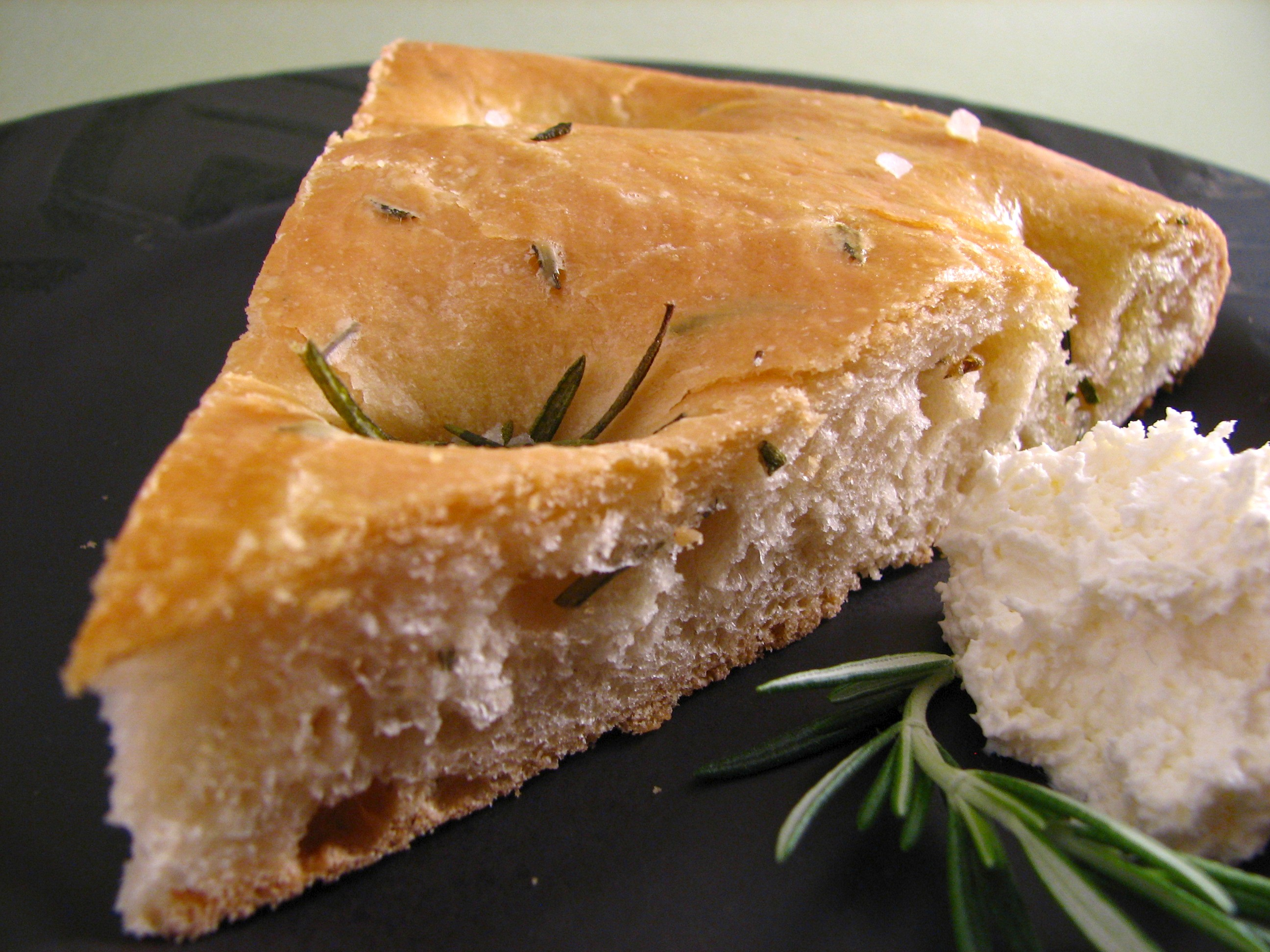
Focaccia

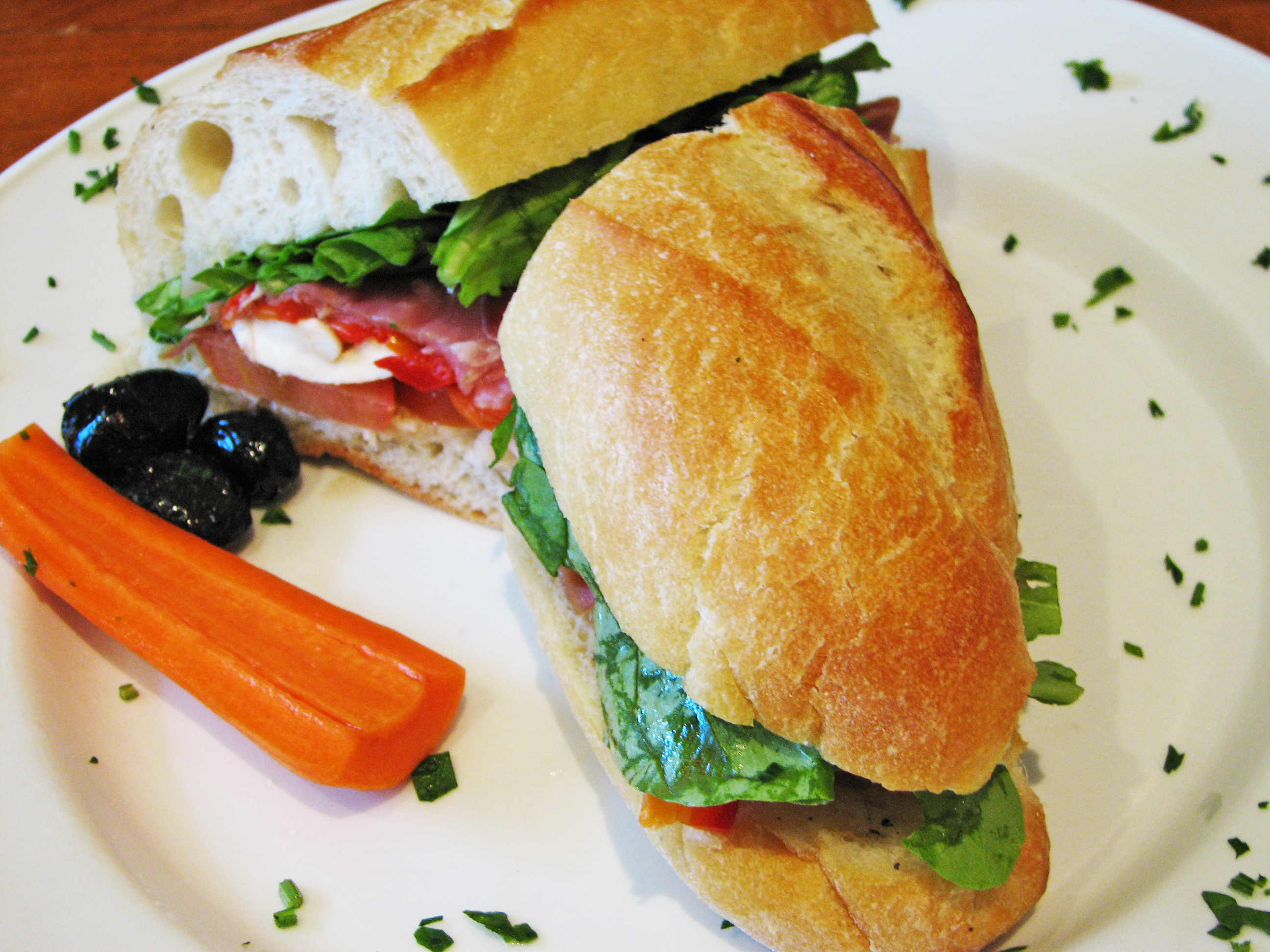
Panino

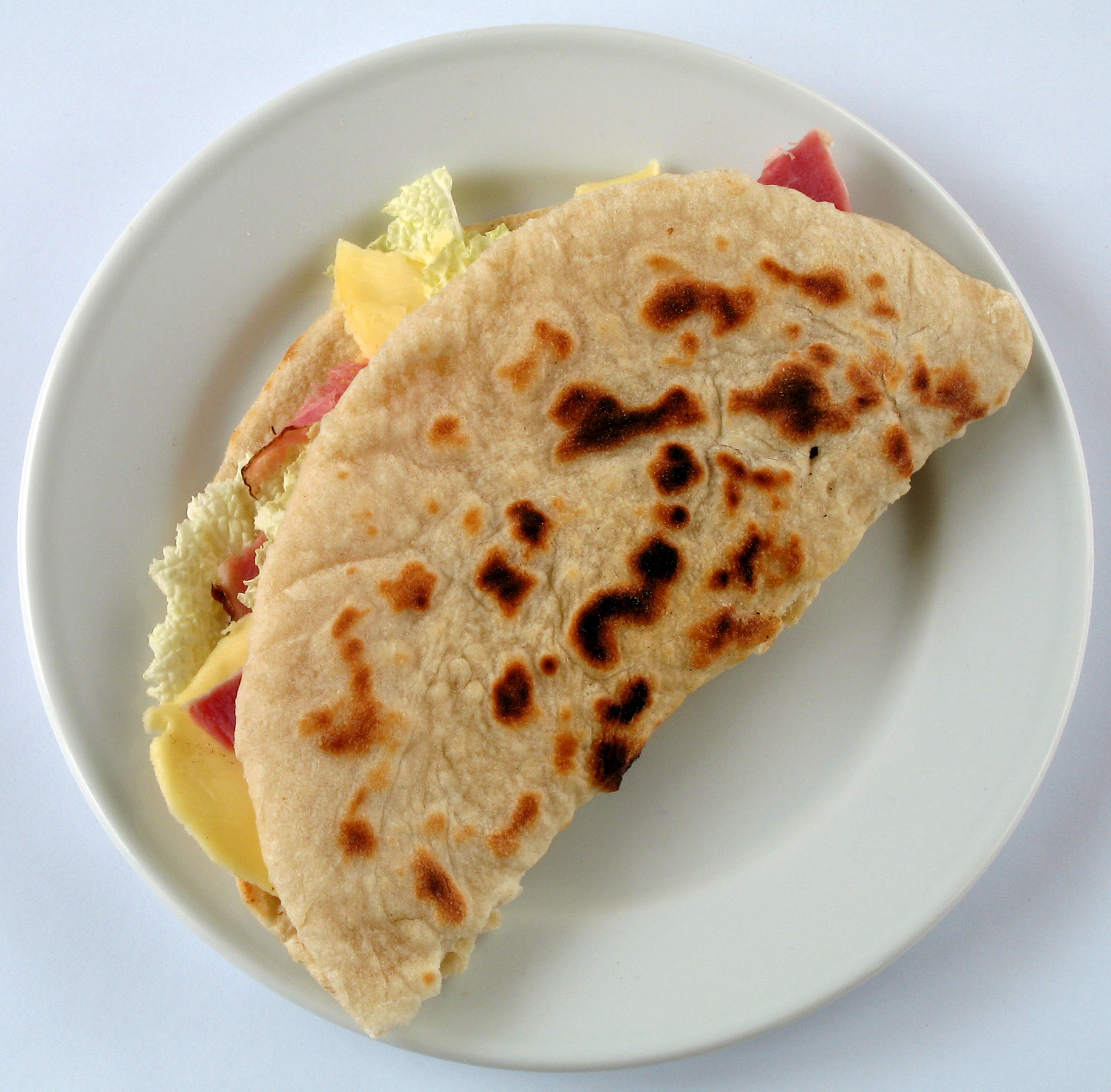
Piadina

- Biova
- Biscotti salati all'anice
- Borlengo
- Bozza pratese
- Bruschetta
- Casatiello
- Ciabatta
- Ciaccino senese
- Ciriola romana
- Colomba pasquale
- Coppia ferrarese
- Cuzzupa
- Crescentina
- Crescentina modenese
- Crescia
- Crocchè
- Crostini
- Donzelle (or zonzelle)
- Ficattola
- Filone
- Focaccette al formaggio
- Focaccia, focaccia al rosmarino, focaccia barese, focaccia con il formaggio, focaccia dolce, focaccia genovese, focaccia pugliese, focaccia secca, focaccia veneta (fugàssa or fugassìn in Venetian language)
- Frisella
- Grissino
- Michetta
- Moddizzosu
- Muffuletta
- Neccio
- Ossa di morto
- Pan di ramerino, panfocaccia, pane cafone (or pane dei Camaldoli), pane carasau, pane casareccio, pane casareccio di Genzano, pane con i ciccioli, pane con uvetta, pane di Altamura, pane di grano Solina, pane di Laterza, pane di Matera, pane di patate, pane fratau, pane integrale, pane nobile di Guardiagrele, pane parruozzo, pane pugliese, pane ripieno, pane rustico, pane sciocco (or pane toscano outside Tuscany)
- Panigaccio
- Panina aretina
- Panini di Sant'Antonio
- Panino – in English dominant countries, panini is widely used as the singular form, with the plural form panini or paninis, although some speakers use singular panino and plural panini as in Italian, panino co i' lampredotto
- Panonta
- Penia
- Piada dei morti
- Piadina romagnola (or simply piadina, traditionally piada), piadina fritta
- Pita
- Pitta di patate
- Pizza bianca (lit. 'white pizza'), pizza di Pasqua (lit. 'Easter pizza')
- Puccia
- Puddica
- Rosetta
- Scaldatelli
- Schiacciata, schiacciata con l'uva, schiacciata di patate, schiacciata di zucca, schiacciata di zucchine
- Schiacciatina (or chisolina)
- Sfilatini di pane
- Sgabei
- Spongada
- Taralli (smaller taralli: tarallini)
- Testaroli
- Tigella
- Tortano
- Tramezzino
- Vastedda

=== Common pizzas ===
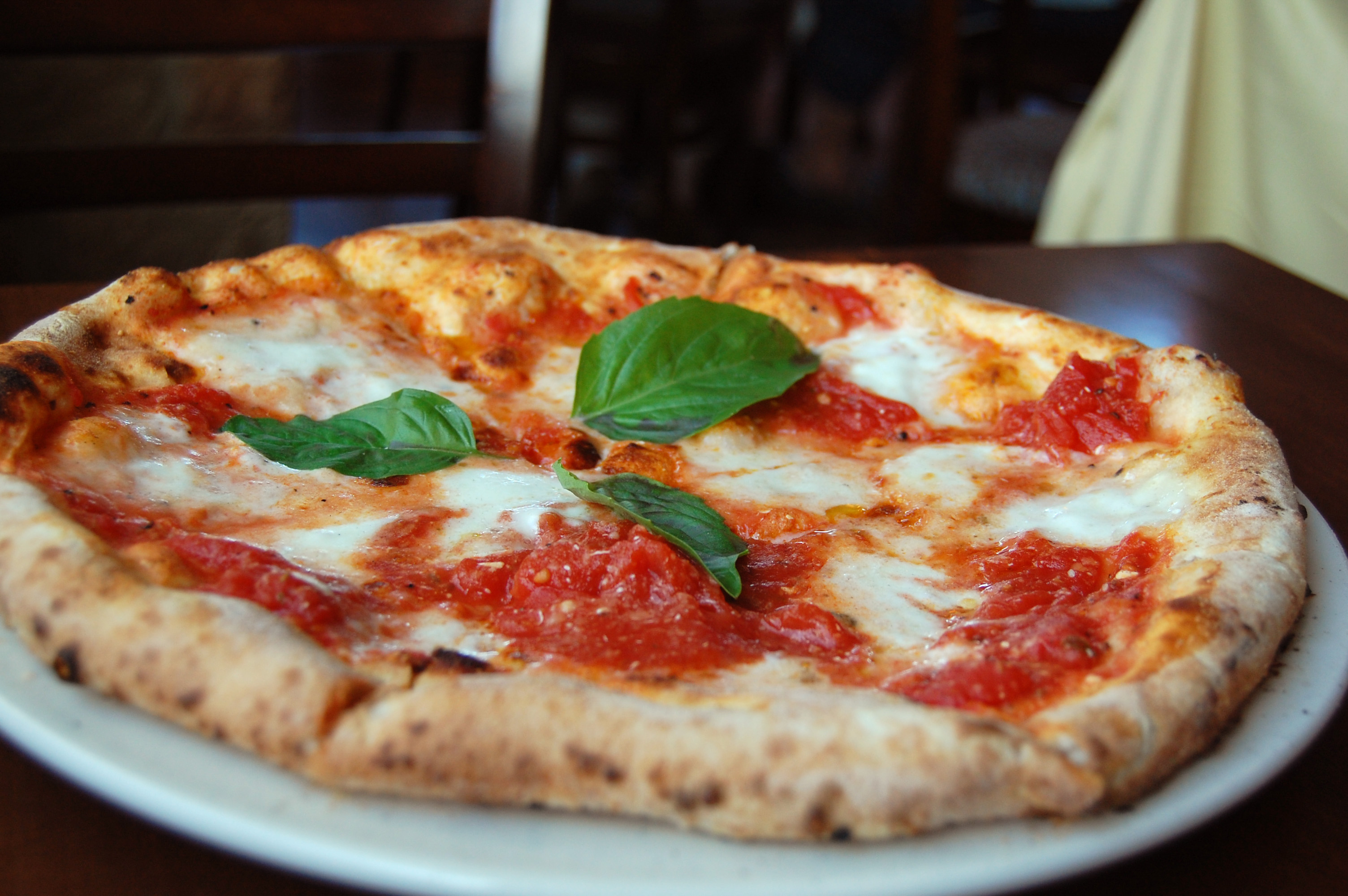
A pizza Margherita

A great number of pizza varieties exist, defined by the choice of toppings and sometimes also crust. There are also several styles of pizza, defined by their preparation method. The following lists feature only the notable ones.

- Calzone
- Panzerotto
- Pizza ai frutti di mare
- Pizza al taglio (Italian for pizza by the slice)
- Pizza al tegamino (or pizza al padellino)
- Pizza caprese
- Pizza capricciosa
- Pizza fritta (lit. 'deep-fried pizza')
- Pizza Margherita
- Pizza marinara
- Pizza quattro formaggi (lit. 'four cheese pizza')
- Pizza quattro stagioni (lit. 'four seasons pizza')
- Pizza Rossini
- Pizzetta
- Sardenaira

==== Pizza preparation styles ====
- Pizza napoletana (lit. 'Neapolitan pizza')
- Pizza romana (lit. 'Roman pizza')
- Pizza siciliana (lit. 'Sicilian pizza')

=== Pasta varieties ===
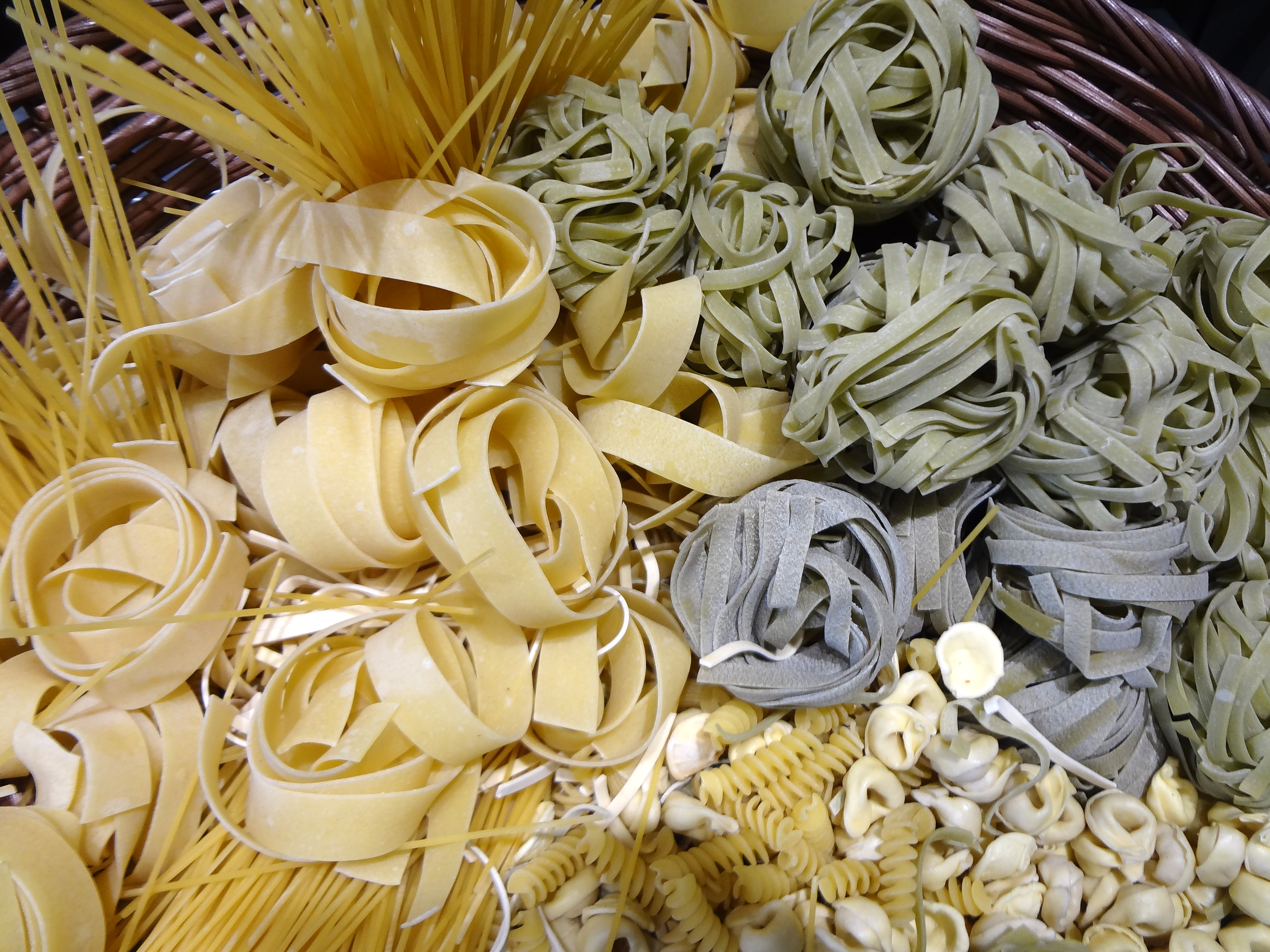
A collection of different pasta varieties

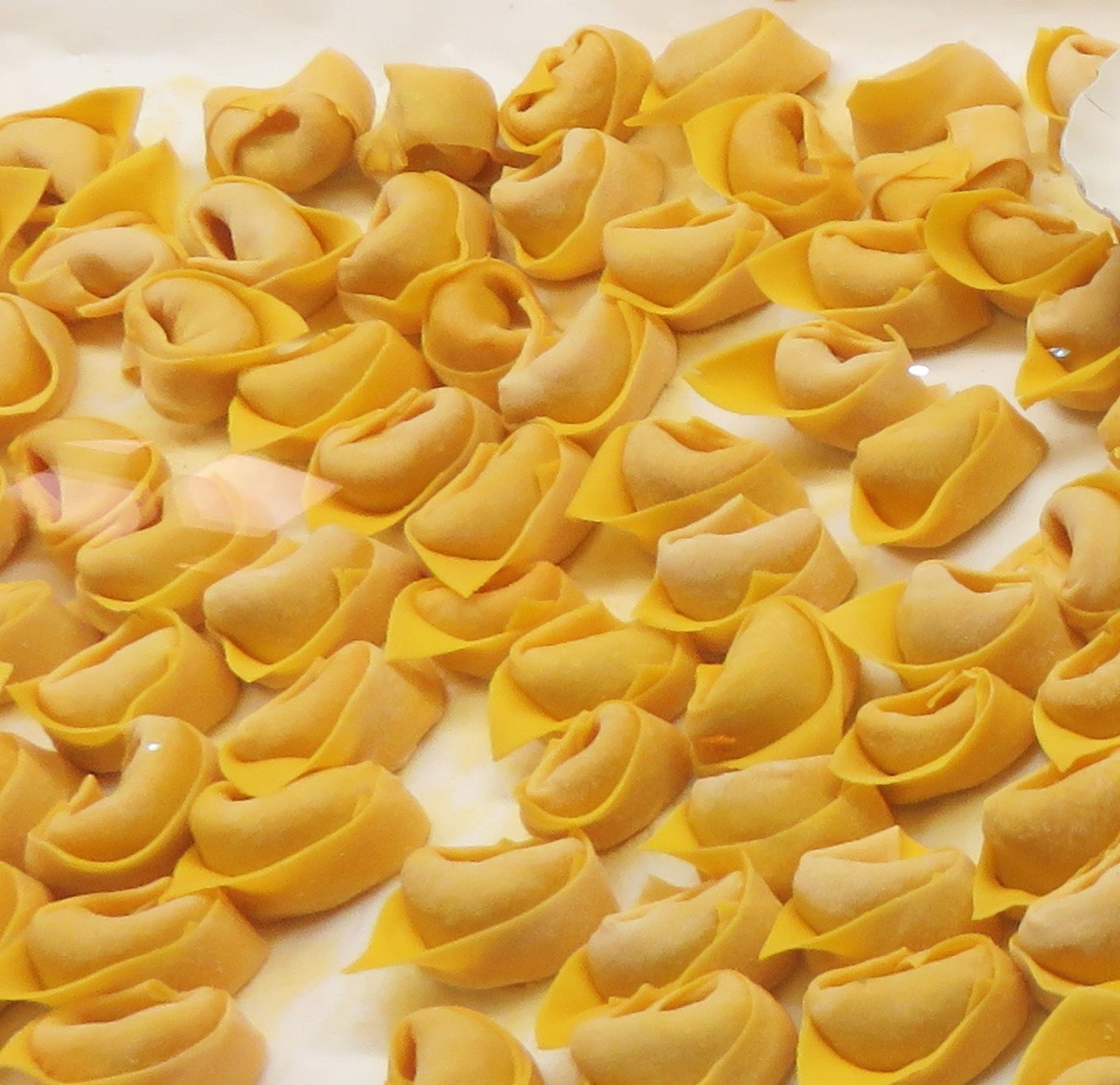
Cappelletti

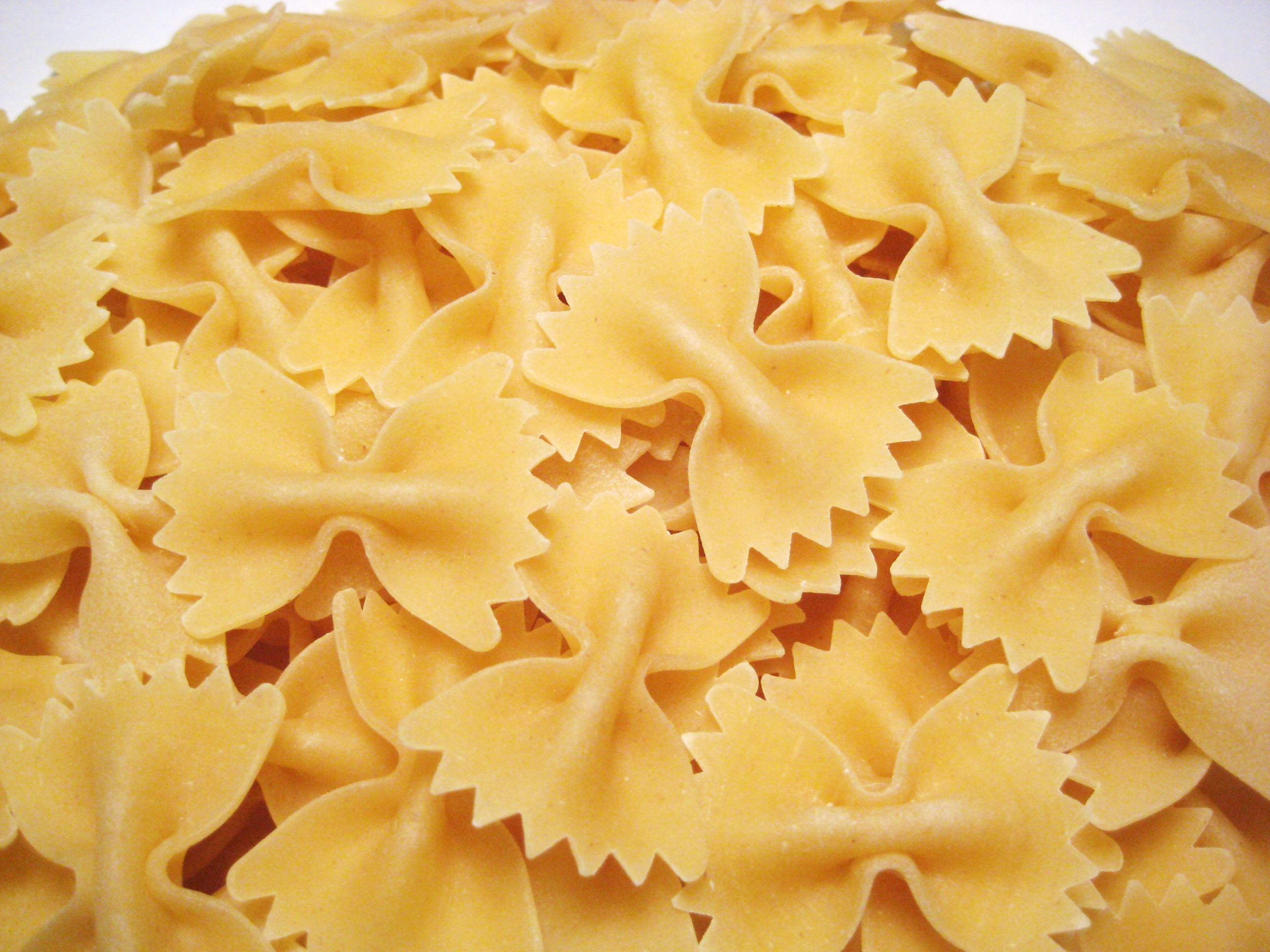
Farfalle

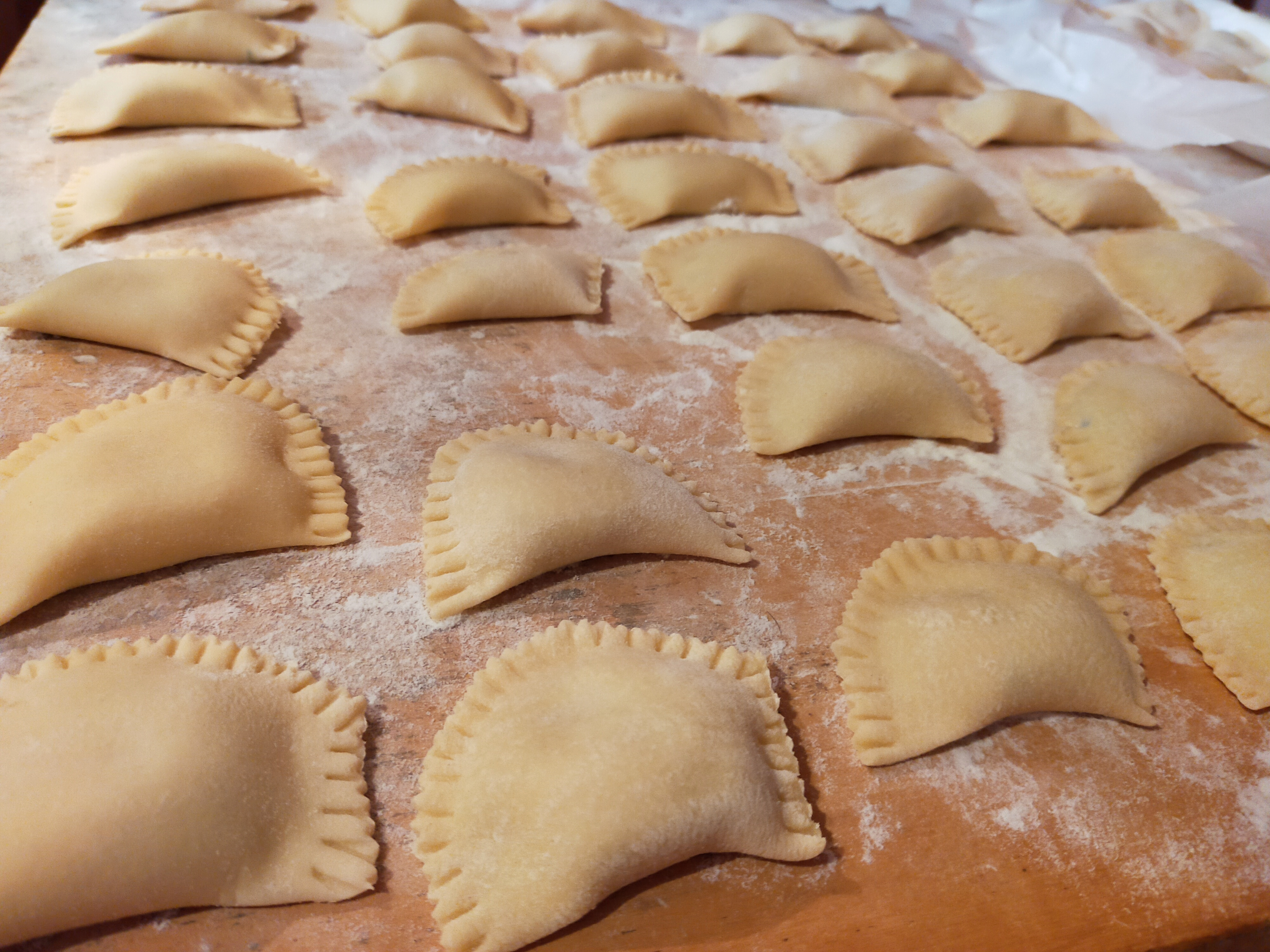
Ravioli

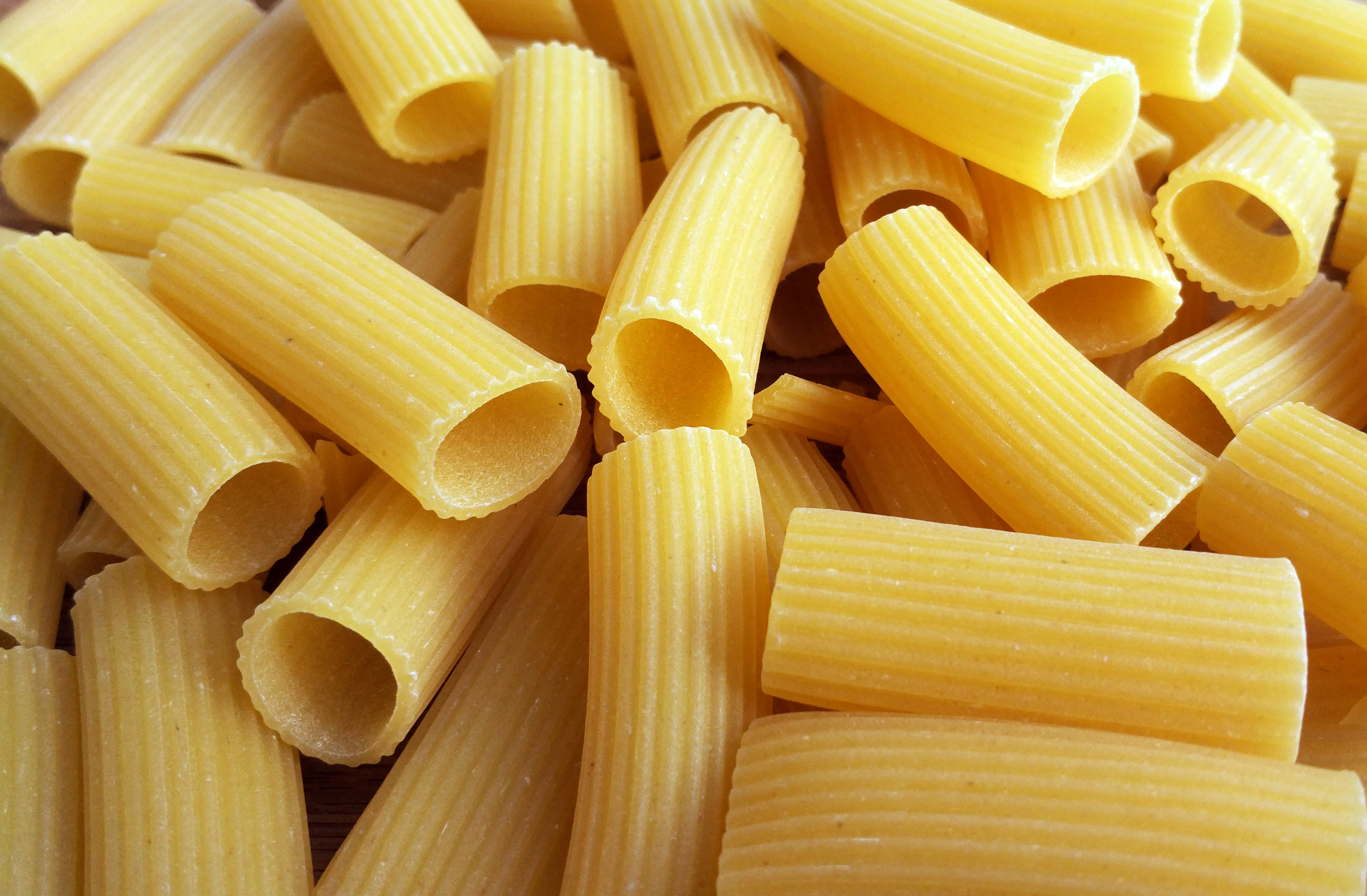
Rigatoni

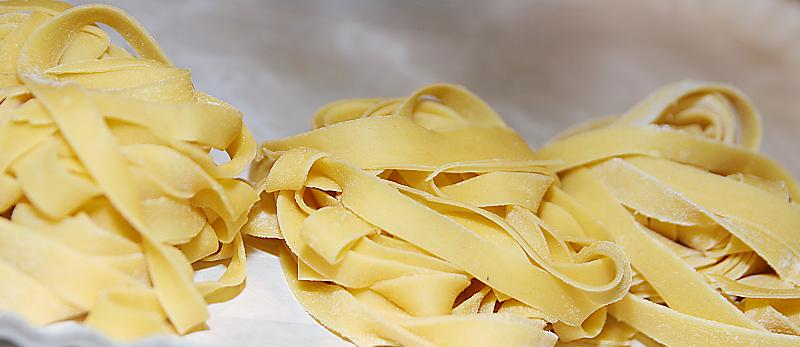
Tagliatelle

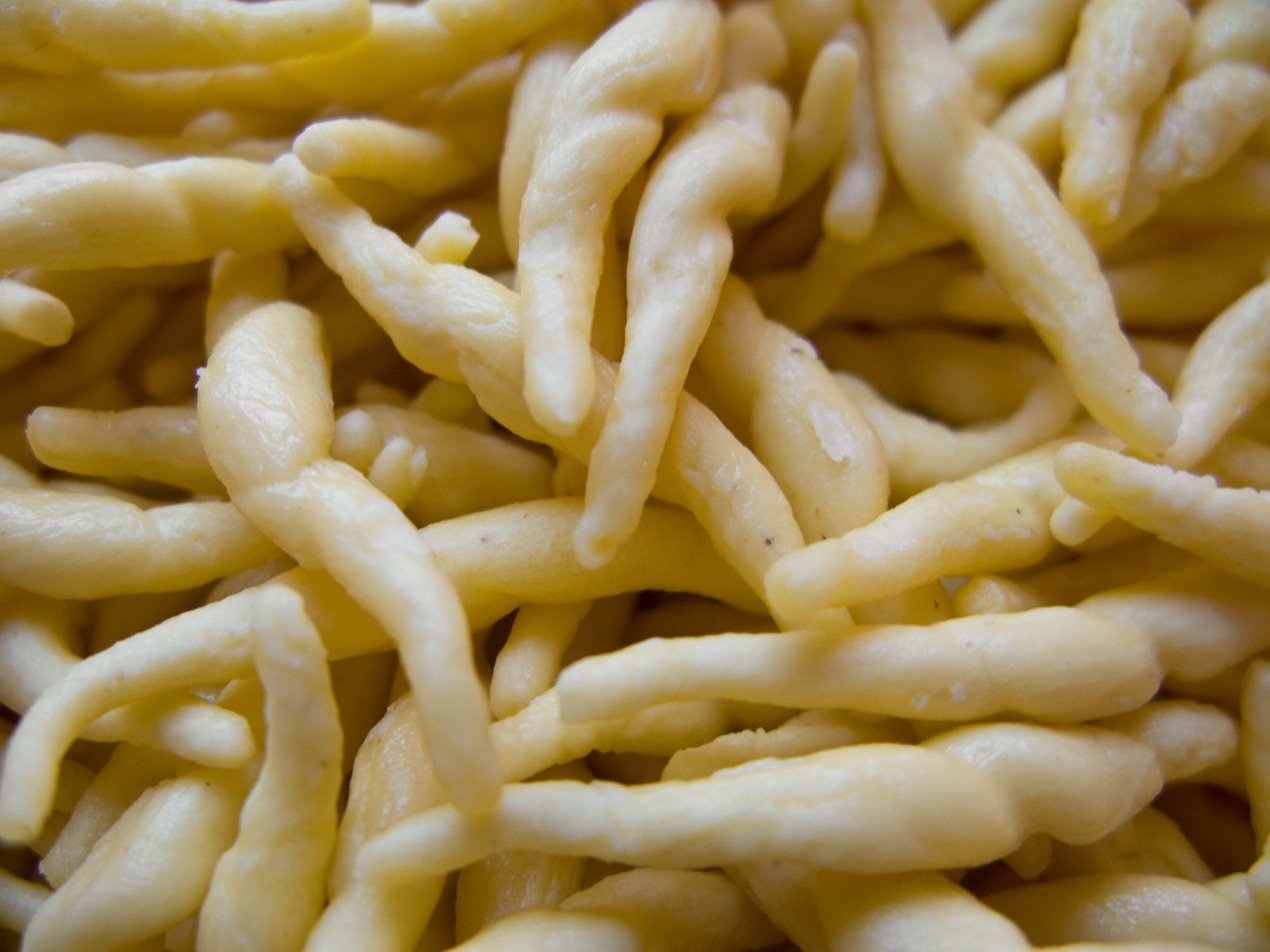
Trofie

- Acini di pepe
- Agnolini
- Agnolotti pavesi, agnolotti piemontesi
- Anelli
- Anolini
- Armoniche
- Balanzoni
- Barbine
- Bavette
- Bigoli
- Bucatini
- Busiate
- Calamarata
- Campanelle
- Candele
- Cannelloni
- Cannerozzetti
- Capelli d'angelo
- Capellini
- Cappellacci di zucca
- Cappelletti
- Capunti
- Caramelle
- Carrati
- Casarecce
- Casoncelli
- Cassulli
- Castellane
- Casunziei
- Cavatappi
- Cavatelli
- Cencioni
- Ceppe (more properly called maccheroni con le ceppe)
- Chifferi
- Chnéffléne
- Cjarsons
- Conchiglie, conchigliette, conchiglioni
- Corallini
- Corzetti (or croxetti)
- Culurgiones, culurgionis d'Ogliastra
- Curzoli (or strigotti)
- Ditali, ditalini, ditaloni
- Eliche
- Elicoidali
- Fagottini
- Farfalle, farfalloni
- Fedelini (or fidelini)
- Ferretti (or frizzuli)
- Festoni
- Fettucce ricce
- Fettuccine
- Filatieddi
- Fileja (or filej)
- Filindeu
- Filini
- Fiori
- Foglie d'ulivo
- Fregula
- Fusilli, fusilli bucati, fusilli napoletani, fusilloni
- Garganelli
- Gemelli
- Gnocchi
- Ingannapreti
- Lagane
- Lanterne
- Lasagna
- Lasagnette
- Lasagnotte
- Linguine
- Lorighittas
- Lumache, lumaconi
- Macarrones de busa
- Maccaronara
- Maccheroncini di Campofilone
- Maccheroni, maccheroni alla molinara
- Mafaldine
- Malloreddus
- Maltagliati (or puntarine)
- Manfrigoli
- Marille
- Marrubini
- Mezzelune
- Mezze maniche
- Occhi di lupo
- Offelle
- Orecchiette
- Orecchioni
- Orzo
- Paccheri
- Paglia e fieno
- Pansotti
- Paparele
- Pappardelle
- Parmitieddi
- Passatelli
- Pasta campana, pasta di Gragnano
- Patacucci
- Penne, mezze penne
- Perciatelli
- Piccagge
- Pici
- Pillus
- Pipe, pipette
- Pizzoccheri, pizzoccheri bianchi della Valchiavenna, pizzoccheri della Valtellina
- Radiatori
- Ravioli
- Rigatoni
- Rotelle (or ruote)
- Sacchettoni
- Sagnarelli
- Sagne
- Scarpinocc
- Scialatielli
- Sedani, sedanini
- Sorprese
- Spaghetti, spaghetti alla chitarra (or maccheroni alla chitarra), spaghettini, spaghettoni
- Spätzle
- Spoja lorda (or minestra imbottita)
- Stelline
- Strangozzi
- Strascinati
- Strichetti (or scrichetti)
- Strozzapreti
- Tacconi
- Tagliatelle
- Tagliolini (or tagliarini)
- Tempestine
- Testaroli
- Tortelli
- Tortellini
- Tortelloni
- Tortiglioni
- Treccioni
- Trenette
- Tria
- Tripoline
- Troccoli
- Trofie
- Trottole
- Umbricelli
- Vermicelli
- Ziti, zitoni, mezzi ziti (or mezzani)

=== Pasta dishes ===
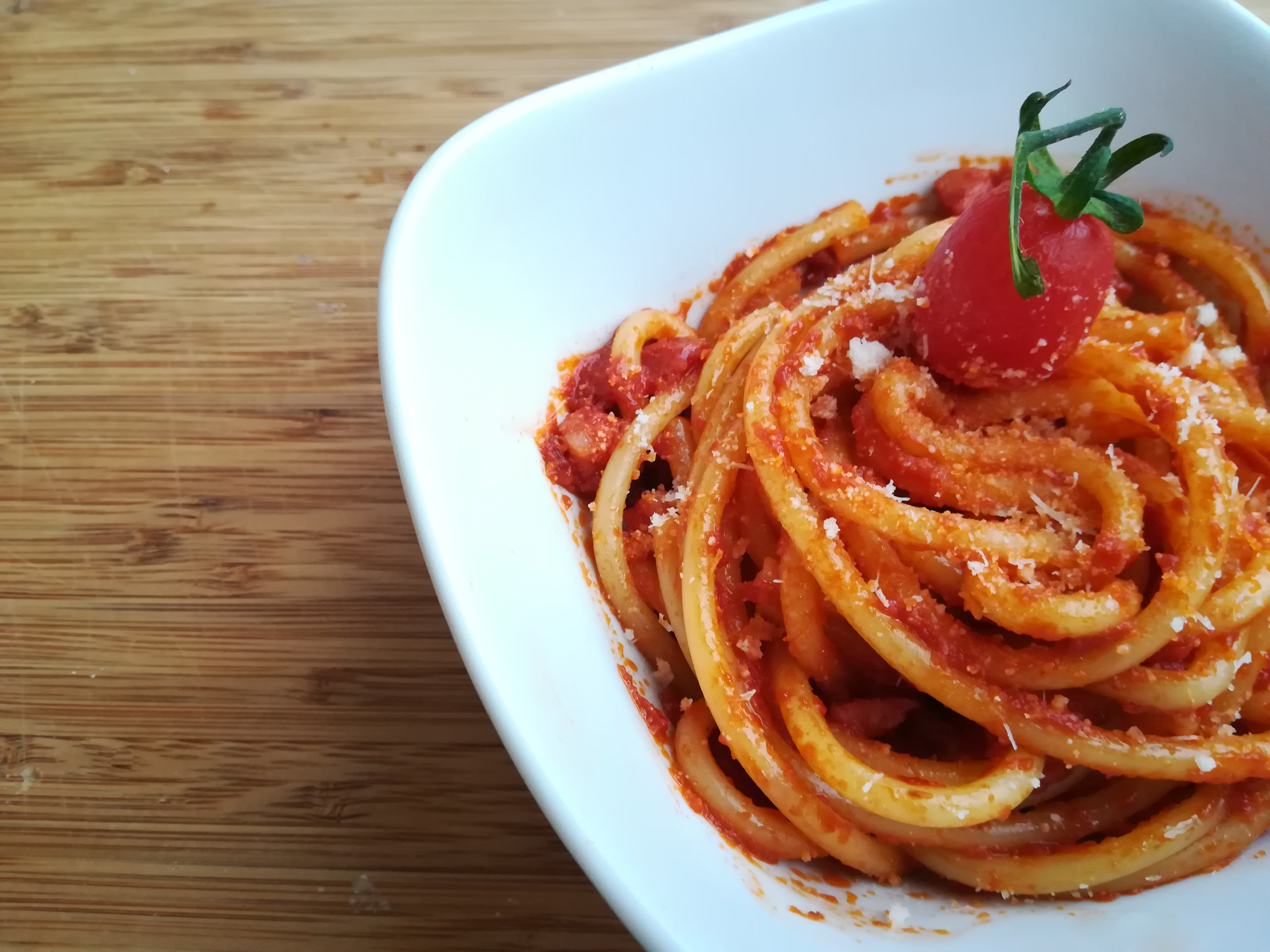
Bucatini all'amatriciana

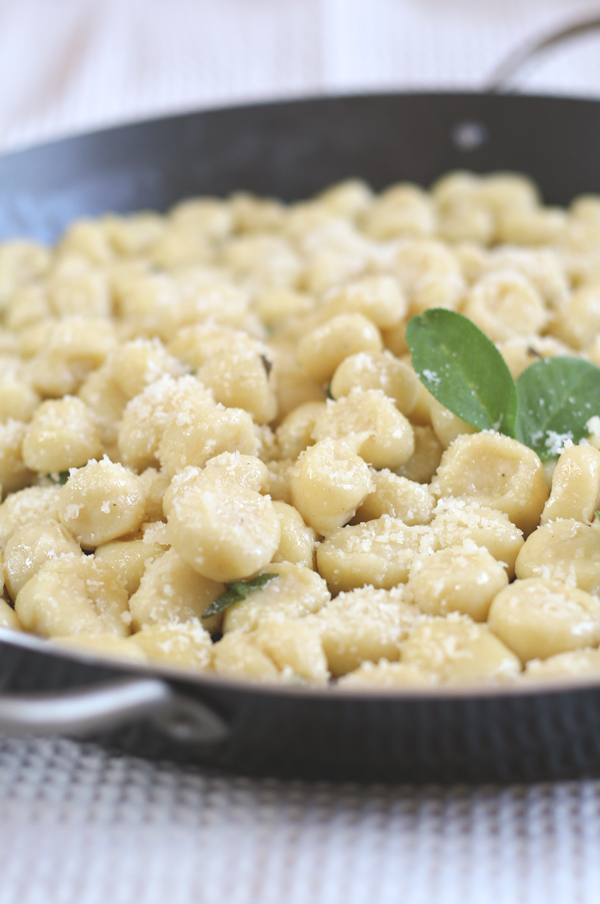
Gnocchi di ricotta, dressed in butter and sage

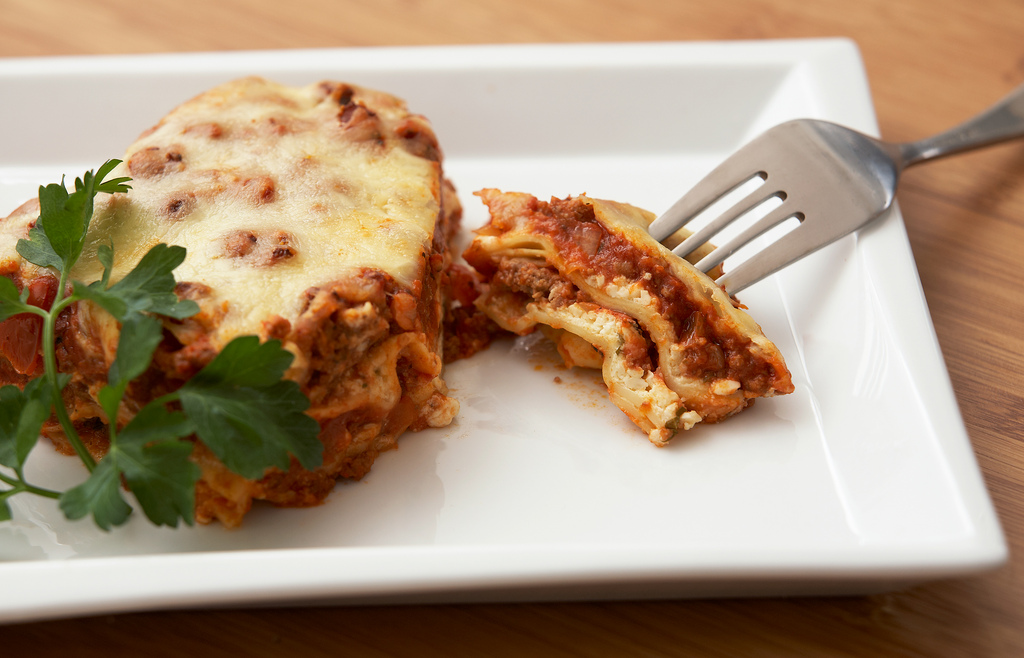
Lasagne al forno

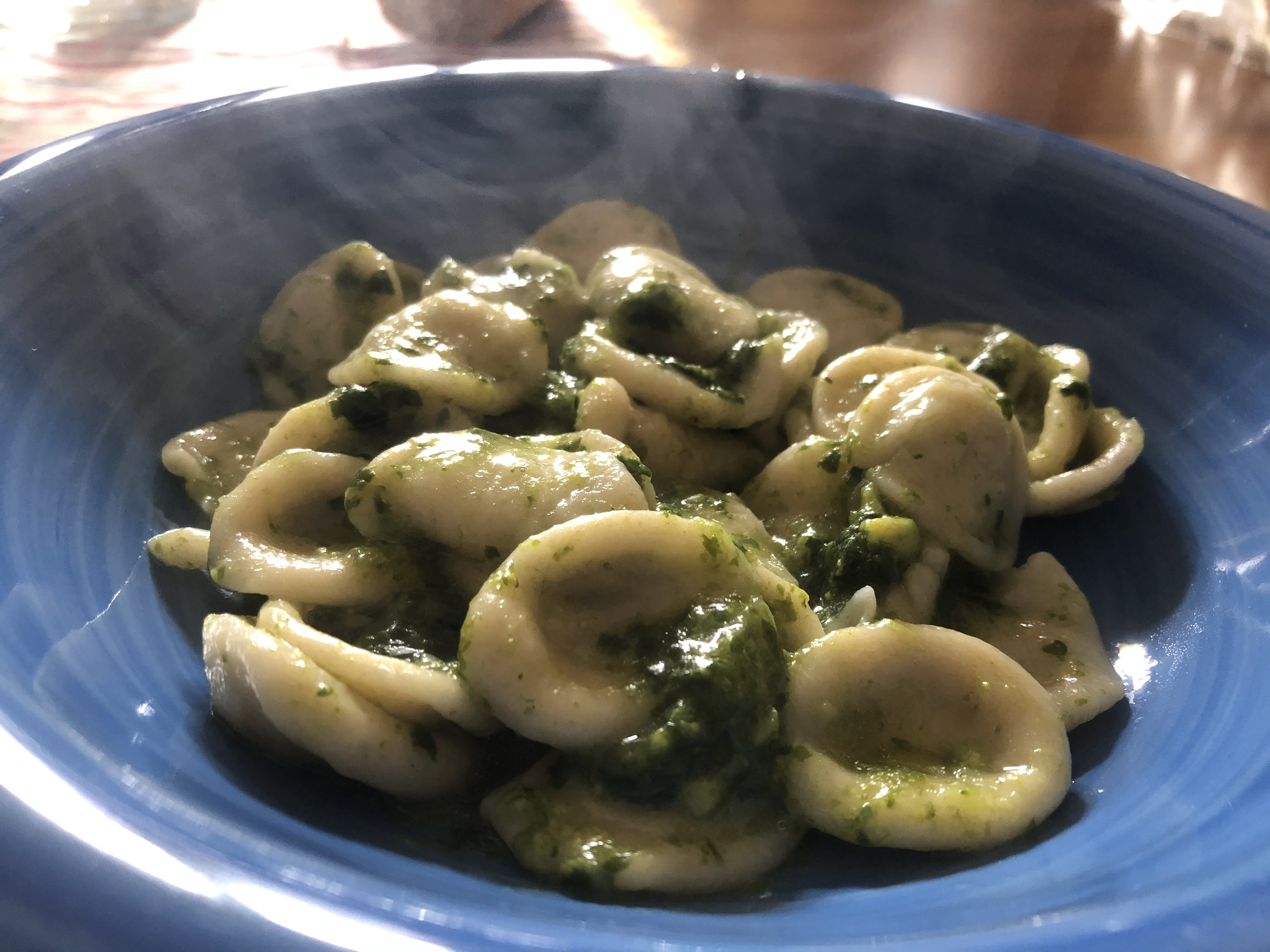
Orecchiette con cime di rapa

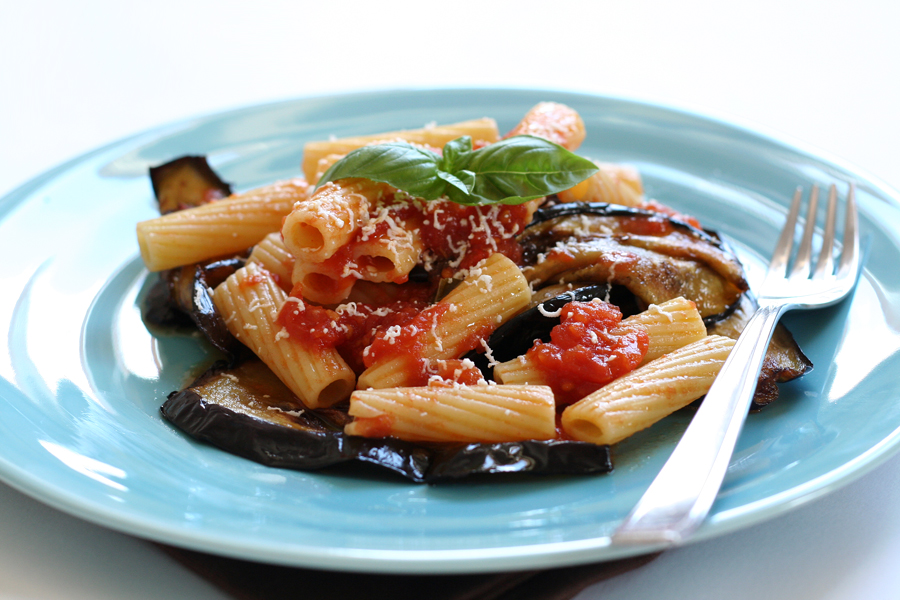
Pasta alla Norma

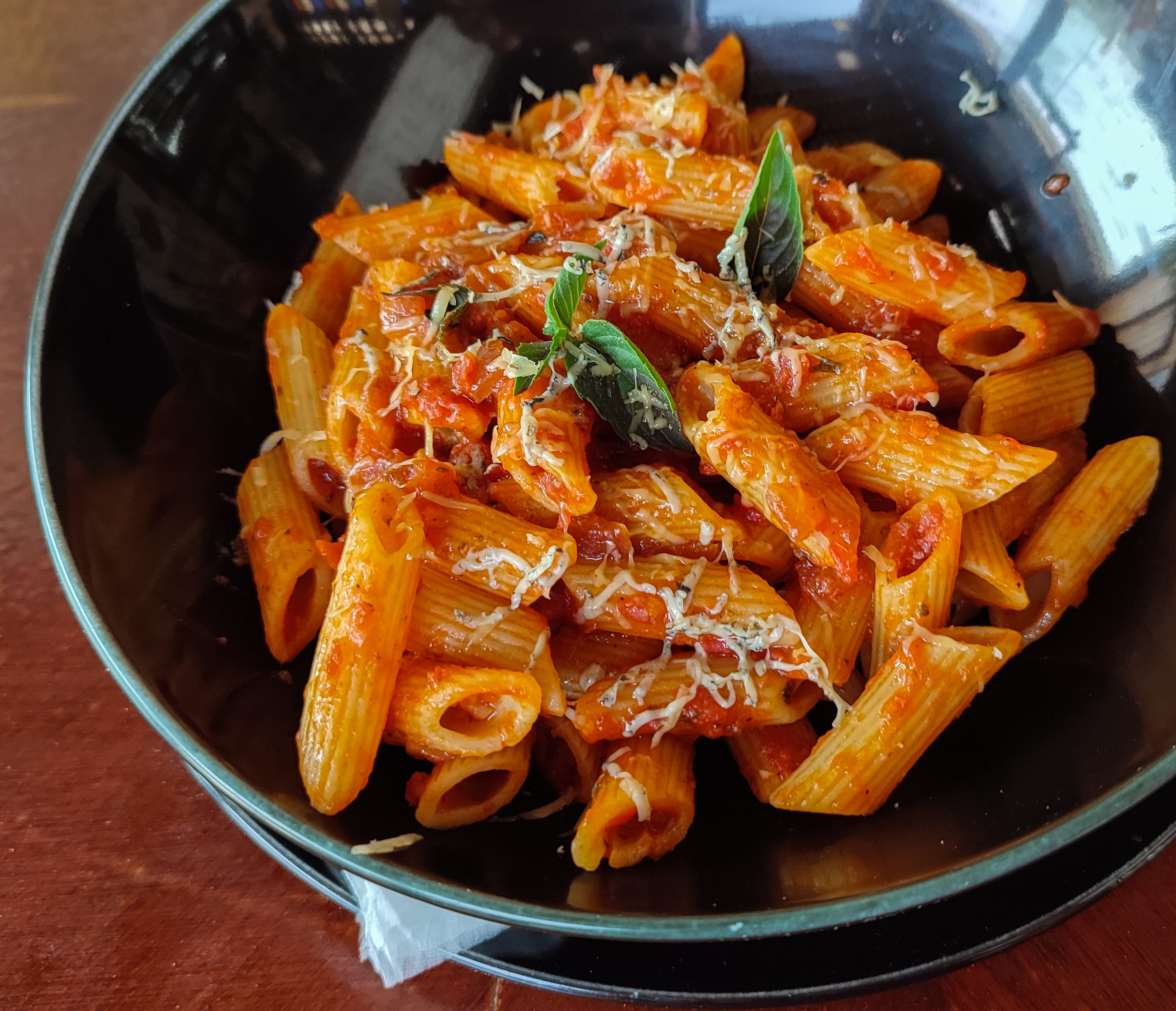
Penne all'arrabbiata

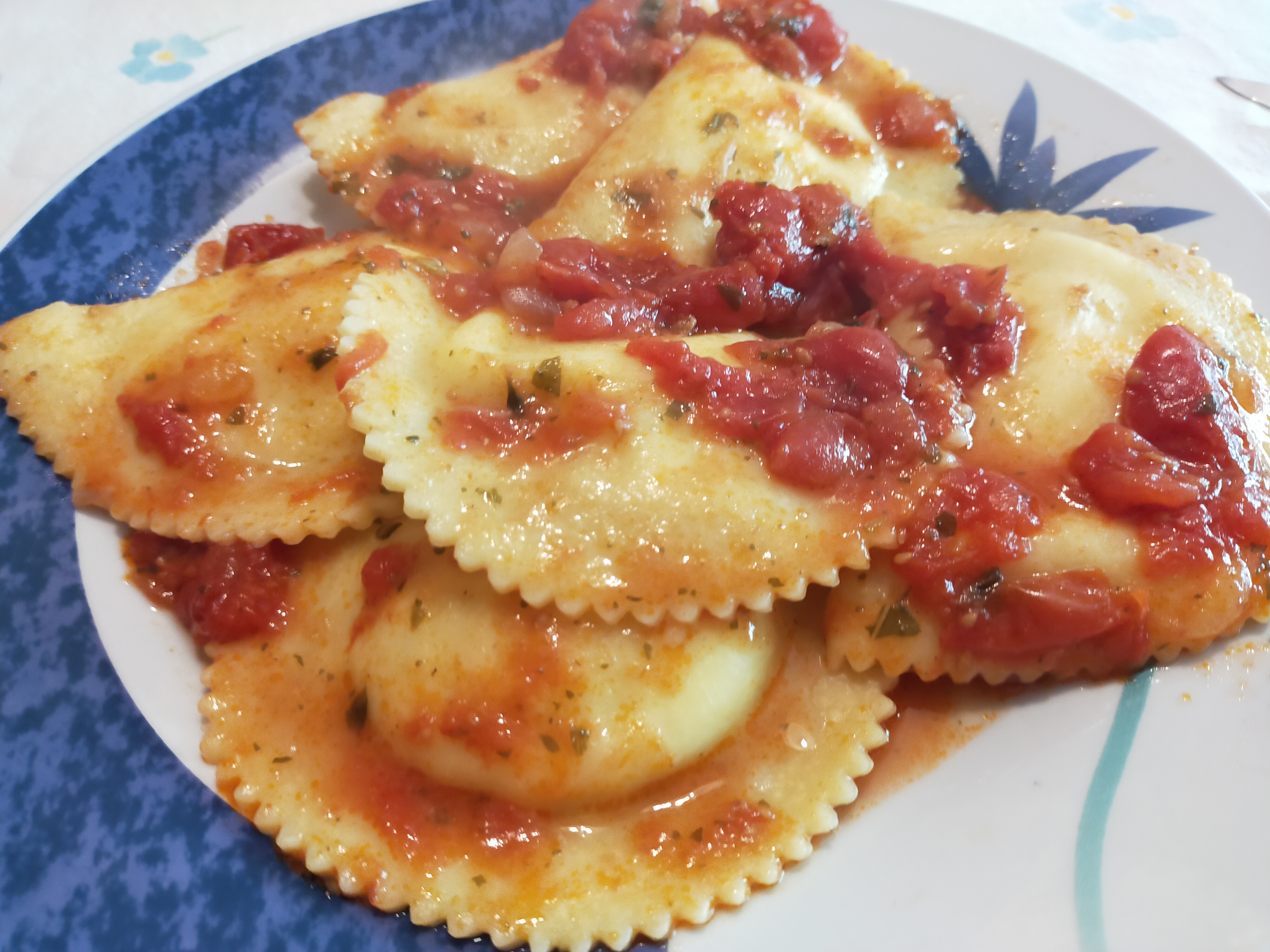
Ravioli di ricotta e spinaci

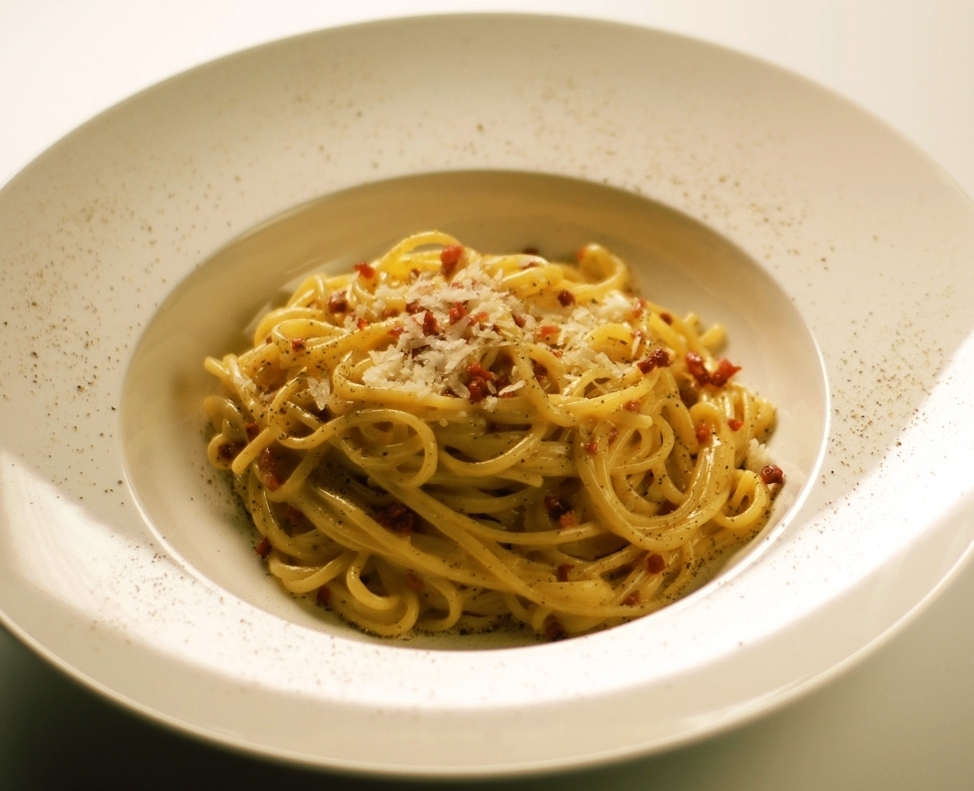
Spaghetti alla carbonara

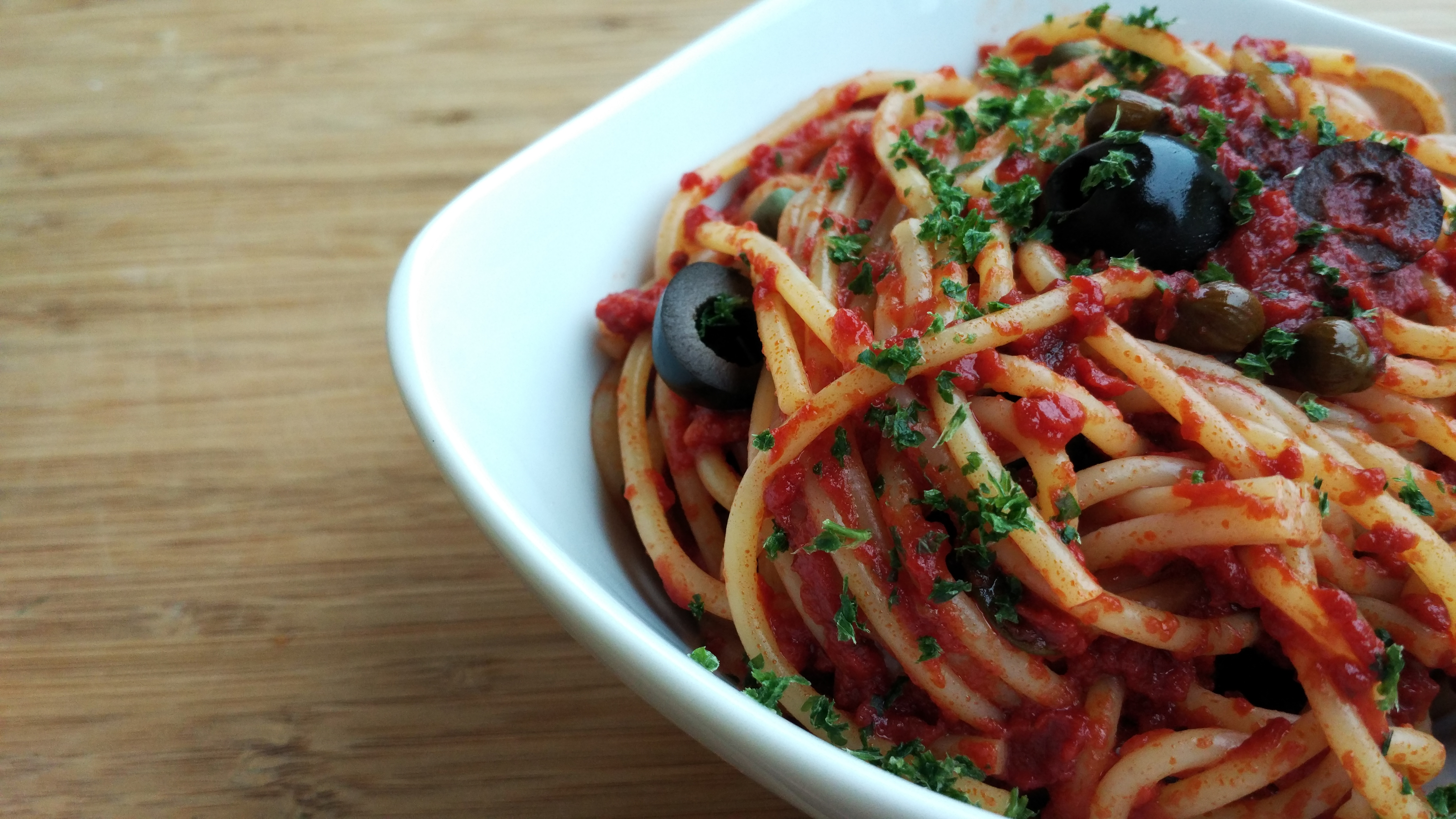
Spaghetti alla puttanesca

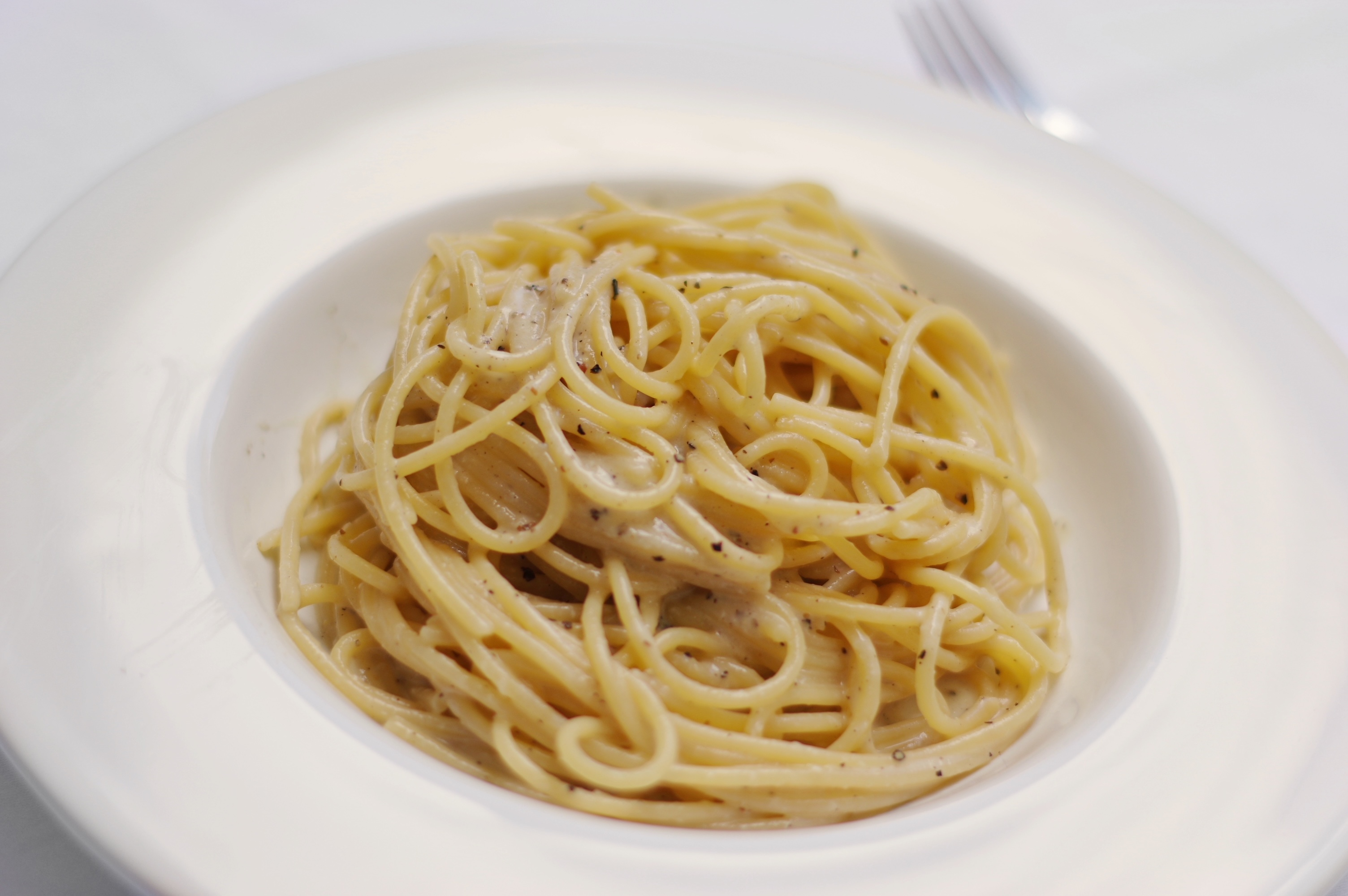
Spaghetti cacio e pepe

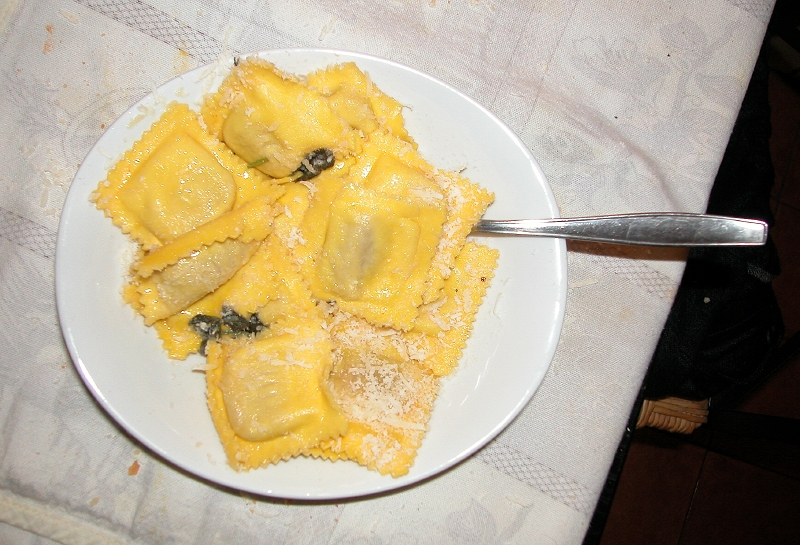
Tortelli di zucca

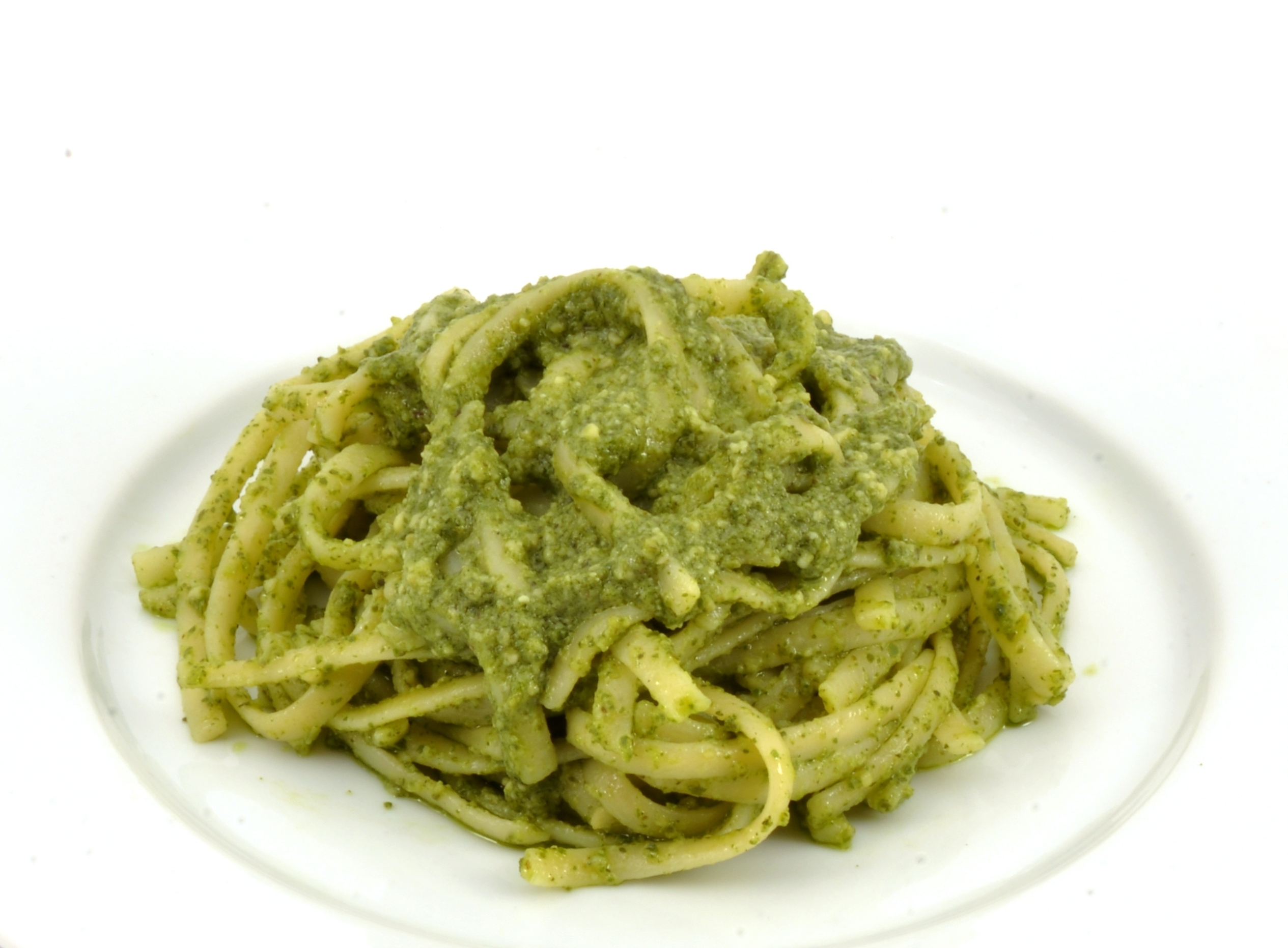
Trenette al pesto

- Anelletti al forno (or timballo di anelletti)
- Anolini in brodo
- Battolli caiegue
- Bigoli in salsa, bigoli col musso, bigoli con l'anatra, bigoli con le sardelle
- Bucatini all'amatriciana
- Busiate alla trapanese
- Caccavelle alla sorrentina
- Cacio e pepe
- Canederli alla tirolese (Knödel)
- Cannelloni ai carciofi, cannelloni di carne, cannelloni ricotta e spinaci
- Carbonara (see also: spaghetti alla carbonara)
- Cappellacci di zucca
- Cappelletti in brodo
- Caramelle di pasta con ricotta e spinaci
- Casoncelli, casoncelli alla bresciana
- Casunziei ampezzani
- Cavatelli ai frutti di mare, cavatelli al pomodoro, cavatelli alla sorrentina, cavatelli allo scoglio, cavatelli cozze e fagioli
- Cavati e ravioli alla ragusana
- Ciceri e tria
- Chnéffléne
- Cjarsons
- Corzetti liguri (or croxetti)
- Culurgiones (or culurgionis)
- Falsi testaroli al ragù
- Fettuccine Alfredo, fettuccine al burro, fettuccine all'abruzzese, fettuccine alla papalina, fettuccine con rigaglie di pollo
- Fileja al ragù
- Fregola con arselle
- Garganelli panna, prosciutto e piselli
- Gnocchi, gnocchi al Castelmagno, gnocchi al gorgonzola, gnocchi al pomodoro, gnocchi al ragù, gnocchi all'ossolana, gnocchi alla bava, gnocchi alla romana (or gnocchi di semolino), gnocchi alla sorrentina, gnocchi alla veneta, gnocchi di malga (or gnochi sbatùi), gnocchi di patate, gnocchi di ricotta, gnocchi di zucca, gnocchi ricci
- Gnudi
- Gramigna alla salsiccia
- Insalata di pasta (lit. 'pasta salad')
- Lagane e ceci, also known as piatto del brigante (lit. 'brigand's dish')
- Laina e ceci
- Lasagna, lasagna bianca, lasagne al pesto, lasagne di Carnevale
- Lasagnette
- Lasagnotte
- Maccheroncini di Campofilone al ragù
- Maccheroni al ragù, maccheroni alla chitarra (or maccheroni carrati), maccheroni alla molinara, maccheroni alla napoletana, maccheroni alla pastora, maccheroni con il sugo di capra
- Malfatti, malfatti di Carpenedolo
- Malloreddus alla campidanese
- Manfredi con la ricotta
- Marubini cremonesi
- Orecchiette al sugo con cacioricotta, orecchiette alla materana, orecchiette con cime di rapa
- Paccheri al sugo di calamari, paccheri ripieni
- Pansotti alla genovese, pansotti alla salsa di noci
- Pappardelle al ragù bianco di cinta senese, pappardelle al ragù di cinghiale, pappardelle al ragù di lepre
- Passatelli all'urbinate, passatelli in brodo
- Pasta â Paolina, pasta ai sassi, pasta al forno (or timballo di pasta), pasta al fumé, pasta al pesto, pasta al pesto di pistacchi, pasta al pomodoro, pasta all'ortolana, pasta alla boscaiola, pasta alla carbonara di mare, pasta alla carcerata, pasta alla checca, pasta alla gricia, pasta alla norcina, pasta alla Norma, pasta alla siciliana, pasta alla sorrentina, pasta alla trabaccolara, pasta alla zozzona, pasta alle arselle (or pasta co' nicchi), pasta allo scarpariello, pasta burro e parmigiano, pasta burro e salvia, pasta cacio e uova, pasta c'anciova, pasta ca nunnata, pasta chi vrocculi arriminati, pasta coi bisi, pasta con i carciofi, pasta con i peperoni cruschi, pasta con la ricotta, pasta con le sarde, pasta con salmone affumicato, pasta con zucchine, pasta del cornuto (or pasta dei cornuti), pasta e cavolfiore, pasta e ceci, pasta e ceci con la 'nduja, pasta e fagioli con le cozze, pasta e lenticchie, pasta e patate, pasta e piselli, pasta e zucca, pasta in bianco, pasta mollicata, pasta 'ncasciata
- Penne al baffo, penne all'arrabbiata, penne alla calabrese, penne alla norcina, penne alla vodka, penne allo zafferano
- Piccagge di ricotta, piccagge liguri
- Pici all'aglione
- Pisarei e faśö
- Ravioli, ravioli capresi, ravioli del plin, ravioli di borragine, ravioli di magro, ravioli di patate, ravioli di ricotta e spinaci, ravioli scarpolesi
- Rigatoni al sugo di coda, rigatoni all'amatriciana, rigatoni alla silana, rigatoni con la pajata
- Sagne a lu cuttéure, sagne e fagioli, sagne 'ncannulate (or sagne torte)
- Scarpinocc
- Scialatielli ai frutti di mare
- Spaghetti aglio e olio, spaghetti al nero di seppia, spaghetti al pomodoro, spaghetti all'amatriciana, spaghetti all'assassina, spaghetti alla busara, spaghetti alla carrettiera, spaghetti alla chitarra con pallottine, spaghetti alla chitarra con sugo di agnello, spaghetti alla chitarra con ricotta, salsiccia e zafferano, spaghetti alla cipolla, spaghetti alla marinara, spaghetti alla molisana, spaghetti alla Nerano, spaghetti alla pescatora, spaghetti alla puttanesca, spaghetti alla siracusana, spaghetti alla vesuviana, spaghetti alle vongole, spaghetti alle vongole fujute, spaghetti allo scoglio, spaghetti con la bottarga, spaghetti con le cozze, spaghetti con puntarelle, acciughe e briciole, spaghetti indiavolati, spaghetti pomodoro e basilico, spaghetti siracusani
- Stroncatura
- Spätzle
- Tagliatelle ai carciofi, tagliatelle ai funghi porcini, tagliatelle al limone, tagliatelle al pomodoro, tagliatelle al ragù, tagliatelle al salmone, tagliatelle alla bolognese, tagliatelle alla boscaiola, tagliatelle con funghi e salsiccia
- Tagliolini al tartufo bianco, tagliolini al limone, tagliolini alla Campobasso
- Testaroli al pesto
- Tordelli lucchesi
- Tortél dóls di Colorno
- Tortelli, tortelli alla piacentina, tortelli amari di Castel Goffredo, tortelli cremaschi, tortelli della Possenta, tortelli di patate, tortelli di zucca, tortelli maremmani, tortelli verdi
- Tortellini, tortellini al pomodoro, tortellini alla bolognese, tortellini alla boscaiola, tortellini burro e salvia, tortellini di Valeggio sul Mincio, tortellini in brodo, tortellini panna e prosciutto
- Tortelloni
- Trenette al pesto
- Troccoli con pomodori secchi, acciughe e mollica di pane
- Trofie al pesto, trofie con crema di noci, trofie alla Portofino
- Tumact me tulez
- Turtèl sguasaròt
- Vincisgrassi, vincisgrassi alla maceratese
- Ziti al forno, ziti al ragù napoletano

=== Rice dishes ===
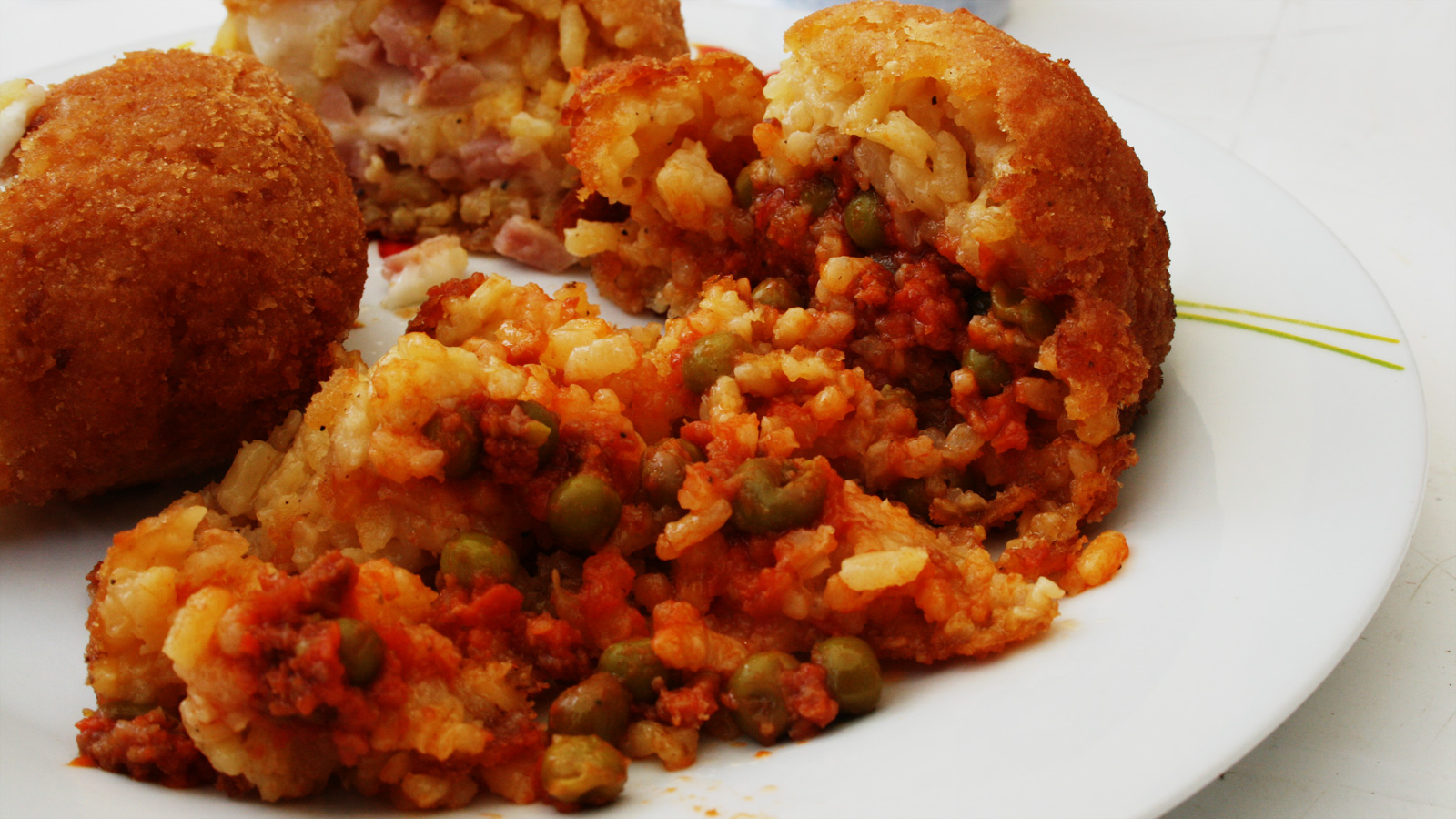
Arancini

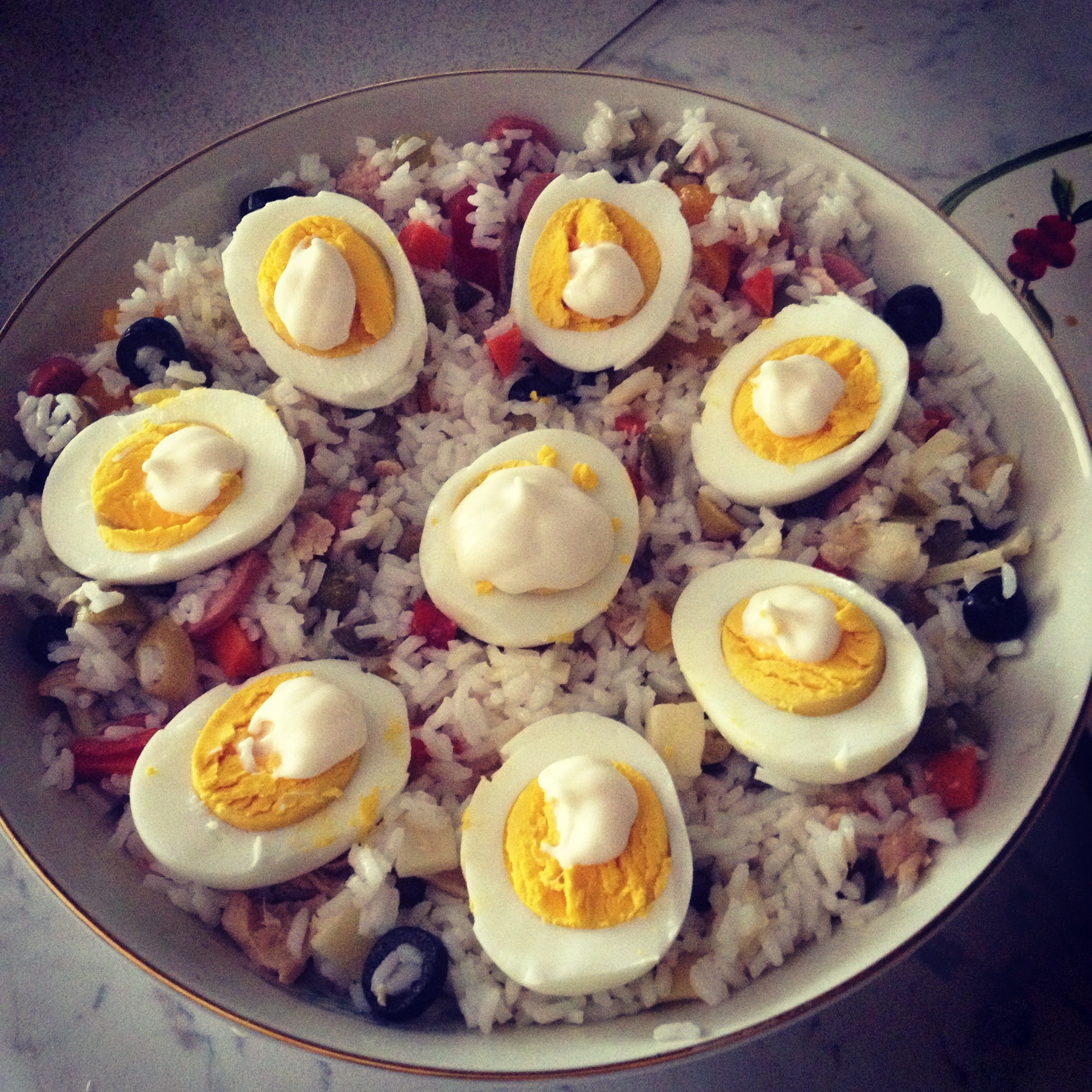
Insalata di riso

Rice dishes are very common in northern Italy, especially in the Lombardy and Veneto regions, although rice dishes are found throughout the country.

- Arancini
- Bomba di riso
- Insalata di riso
- Minestra di riso e indivia
- Panissa (in the Vercelli area), or paniscia (in the Novara area)
- Pomodori ripieni di riso
- Risi e bisi – rice and peas
- Riso al latte (or riso e latte), riso in bianco, risotto, risotto agli asparagi, risotto ai carciofi, risotto ai fegatini, risotto ai fiori di zucca, risotto ai frutti di mare, risotto ai funghi, risotto ai funghi e salsiccia, risotto ai quattro formaggi, risotto al Barolo, risotto al cavolfiore, risotto al Gorgonzola, risotto al nero di seppia, risotto al parmigiano, risotto al tartufo nero, risotto al tastasal, risotto alla certosina, risotto alla fiorentina, risotto alla marinara, risotto all'Amarone, risotto alla milanese (also called riso giallo and risotto allo zafferano), risotto alla monzese, risotto alla parmigiana, risotto alla pescatora, risotto alla piemontese, risotto alla pilota (or riso alla pilota), risotto alla sbirraglia, risotto alla tinca, risotto alla valdostana, risotto alla viareggina, risotto alla zucca, risotto alle erbette, risotto alle ortiche, risotto alle verze, risotto all'isolana, risotto allo champagne, risotto allo spazzacamino, risotto col puntèl, risotto con i saltaréi, risotto con le rane, risotto con salsiccia, risotto di gò (ghiozzo), risotto seppie e bieta
- Sartù di riso, sartù vegetariano
- Supplì, supplì al telefono

=== Fish dishes ===
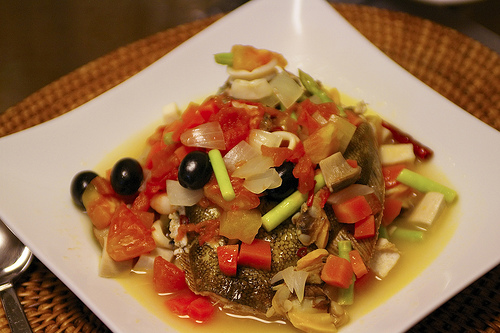
A variation of acqua pazza, a fish dish featuring black olives, scallions and mushrooms

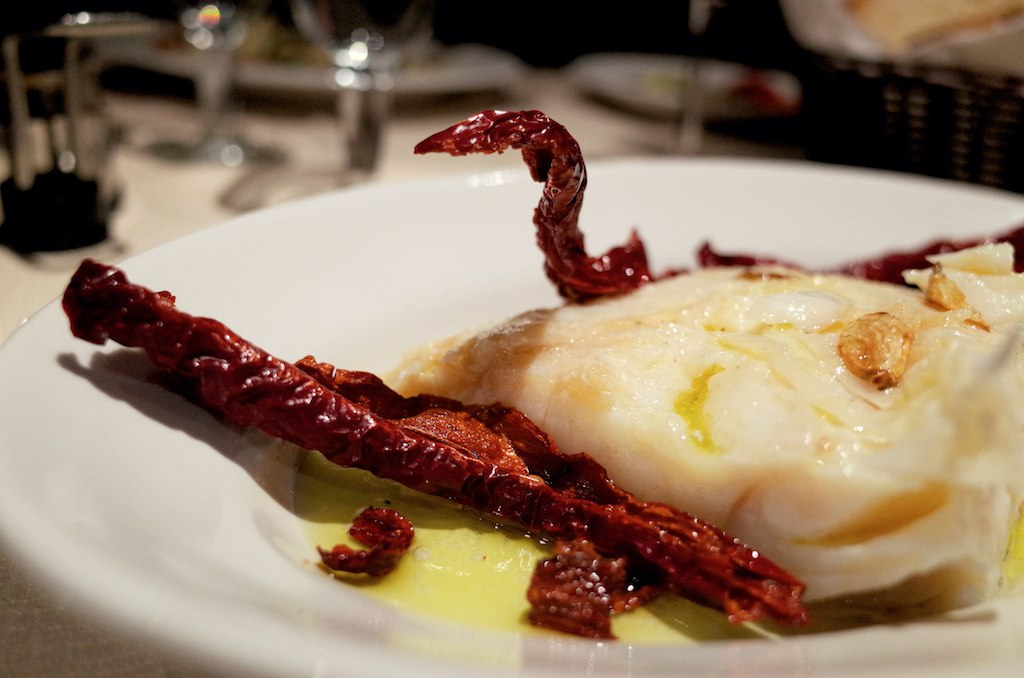
Baccalà alla lucana

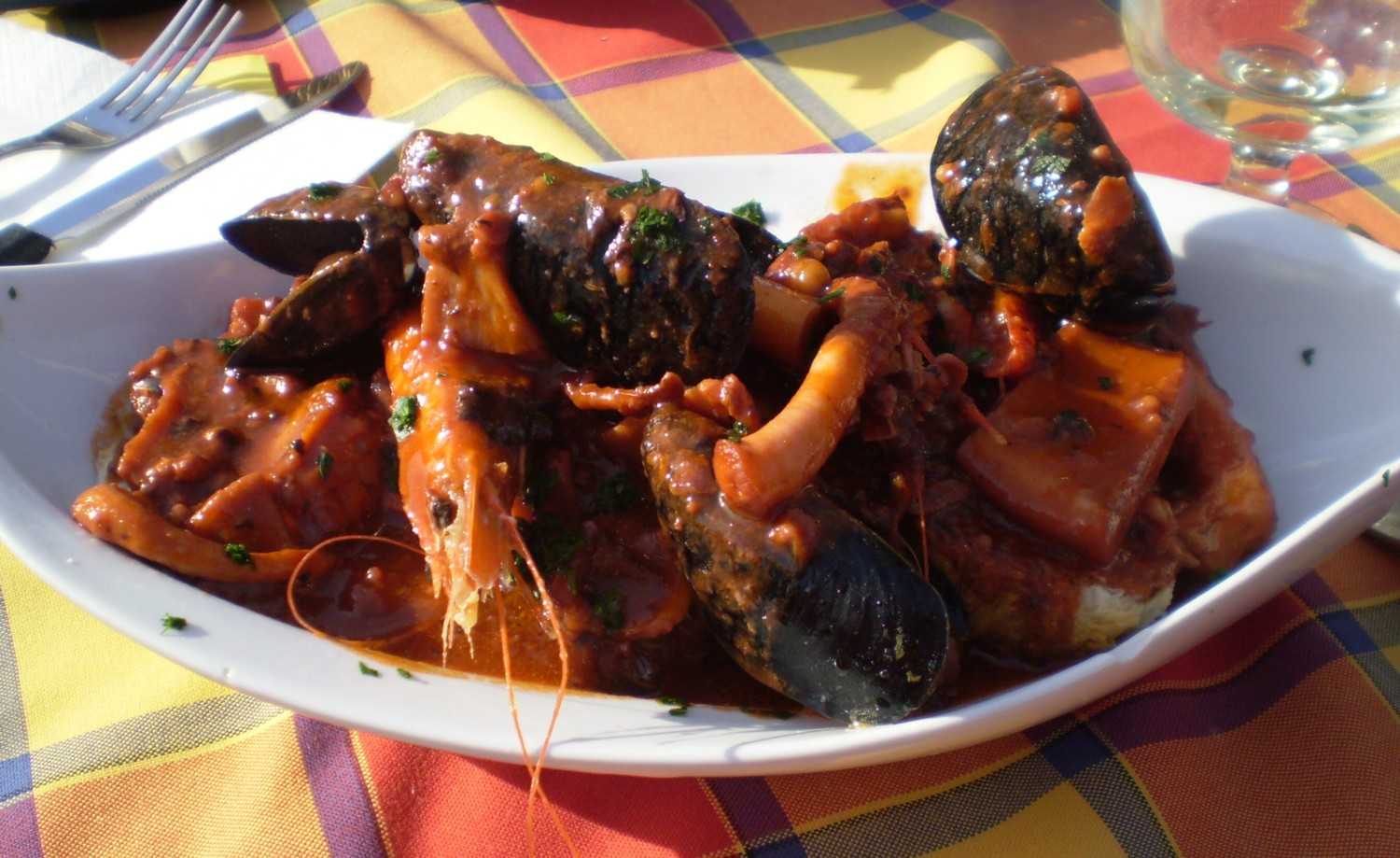
Cacciucco

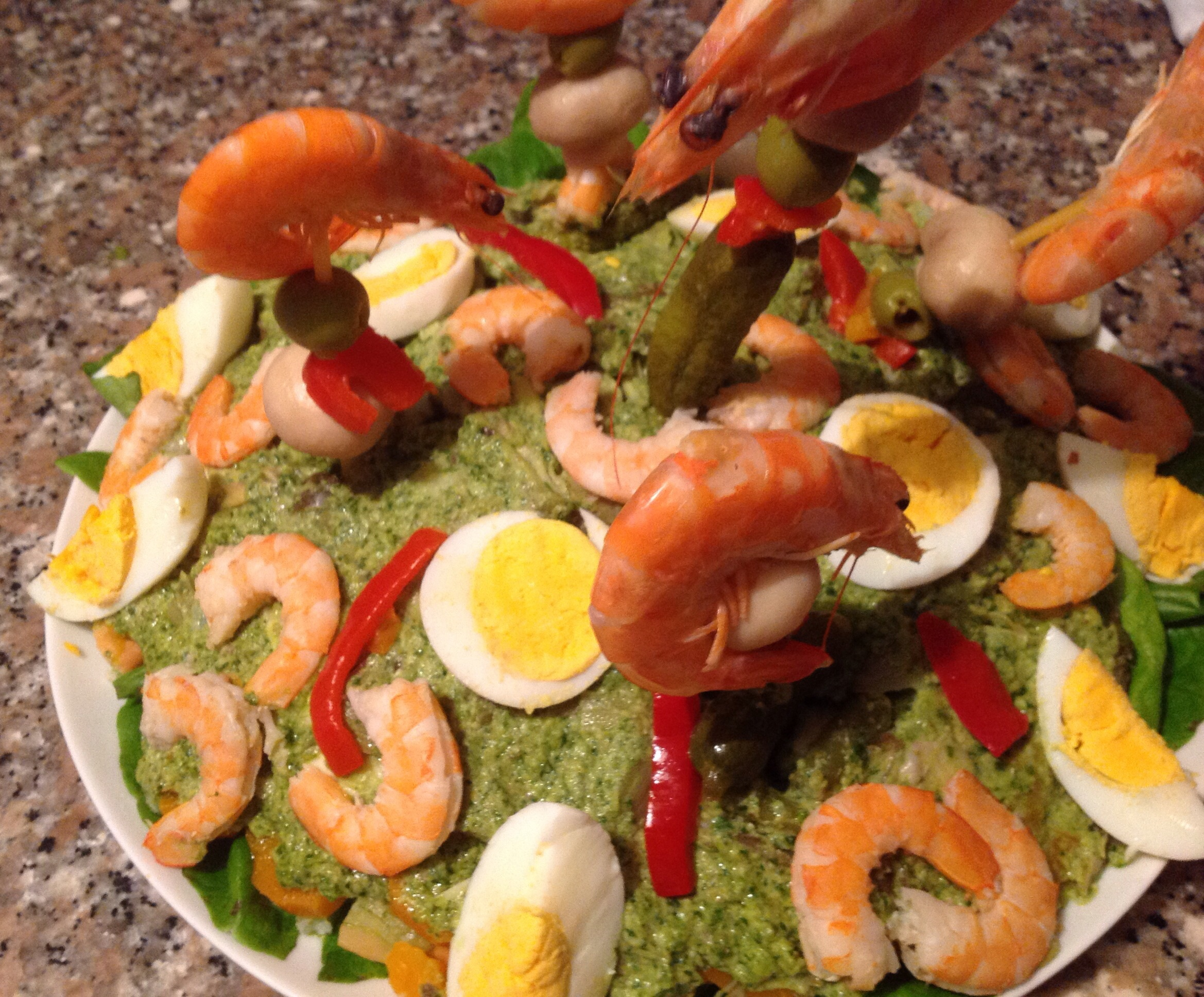
Cappon magro

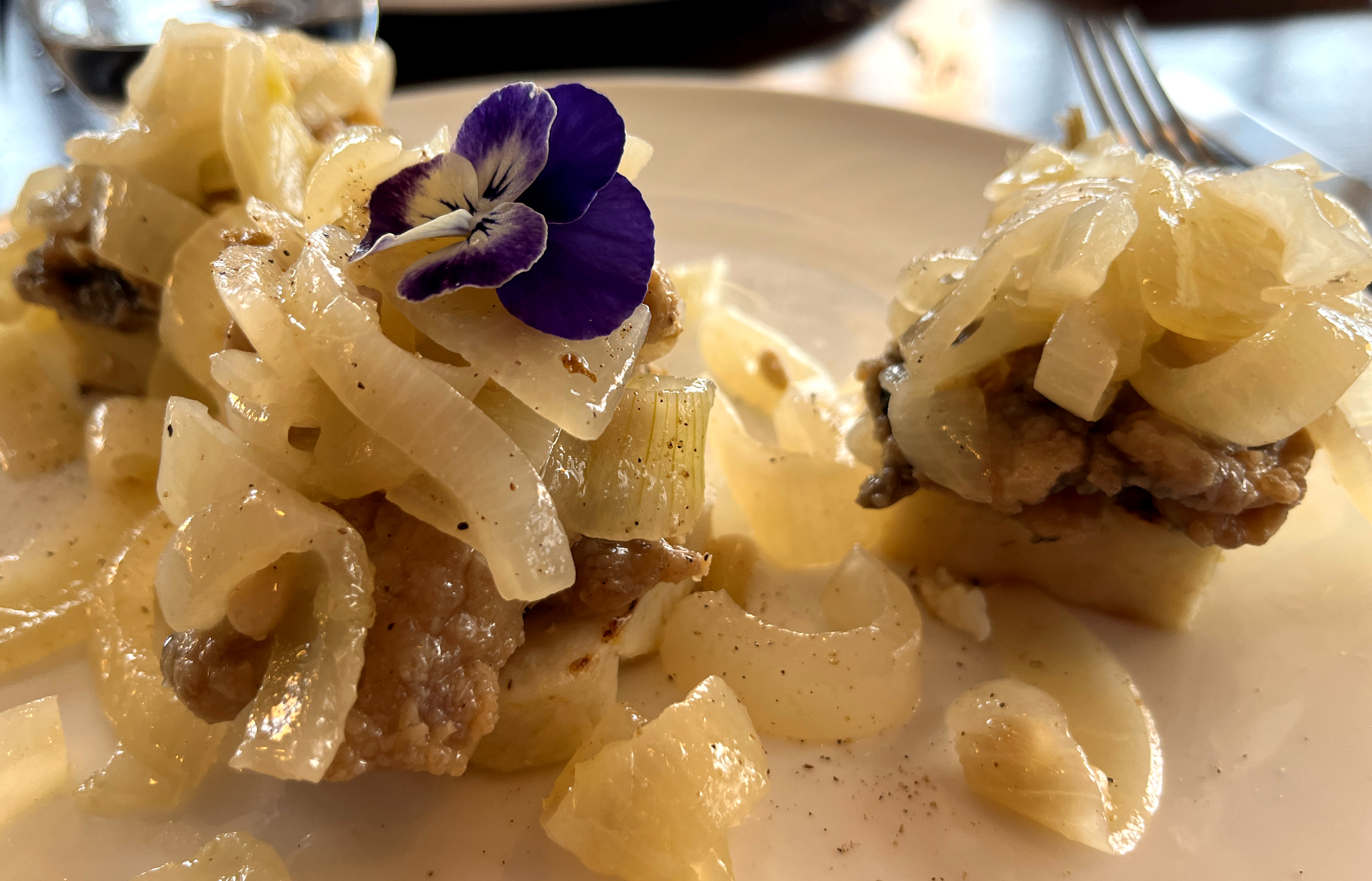
Sarde in saor

- Acciughe fritte
- Acquadelle o latterini fritti
- Acqua pazza
- Alici arreganate, alici fritte, alici in carpione, alici indorate e fritte, alici marinate
- Anguilla marinata
- Baccalà, baccalà all'abruzzese, baccalà alla lucana, baccalà alla vicentina, baccalà fritto, baccalà mantecato
- Boreto alla graisana
- Branzino al sale
- Cacciucco
- Calamari fritti, calamari ripieni
- Capesante alla veneziana, capesante gratinate
- Capitone fritto
- Caponata di pesce spada
- Cappon magro
- Carpaccio
- Coregone di Campotosto
- Cozze alla marinara, cozze alla tarantina, cozze allo zafferano, cozze fritte, cozze ripiene
- Cuscus di pesce (or cuscus alla trapanese)
- Filetti di merluzzo in padella, filetti di orata al cartoccio
- Frittata di bianchetti
- Frittura di pesce (or frittura mista di pesce)
- Gamberi al forno
- Gamberoni in padella
- Granseola alla veneziana
- Impanata di pesce spada
- Impepata di cozze
- Involtini di pesce spada, involtini di platessa
- Missoltini con polenta
- Moscardini alla ligure
- Nasello al forno (lit. 'baked hake')
- Orata al forno, orata alla griglia
- Ostriche alla griglia
- Pesce a scabecciu
- Pesce spada al forno, pesce spada al salmoriglio, pesce spada alla ghiotta, pesce spada alla siciliana
- Pescestocco alla messinese
- Polenta e aringhe
- Polpette di pesce
- Polpi alla lucìana
- Sarde a beccafico, sarde al forno, sarde fritte, sarde grigliate, sarde in saor, sarde ripiene
- Scampi alla busara, scampi gratinati
- Scapece alla vastese, scapece gallipolina
- Seppie alla veneziana, seppie e piselli, seppie in umido, seppie in zimino, seppie ripiene al forno
- Sogliola alla mugnaia
- Spiedini di mare, spiedini di anguilla
- Stoccafisso accomodato alla ligure
- Tiella, tiella barese (riso, patate e cozze)
- Tonno alla siciliana, tonno sott'olio
- Totani ripieni
- Triglie alla livornese
- Trota al cartoccio, trota in padella

=== Meat dishes and salumi ===
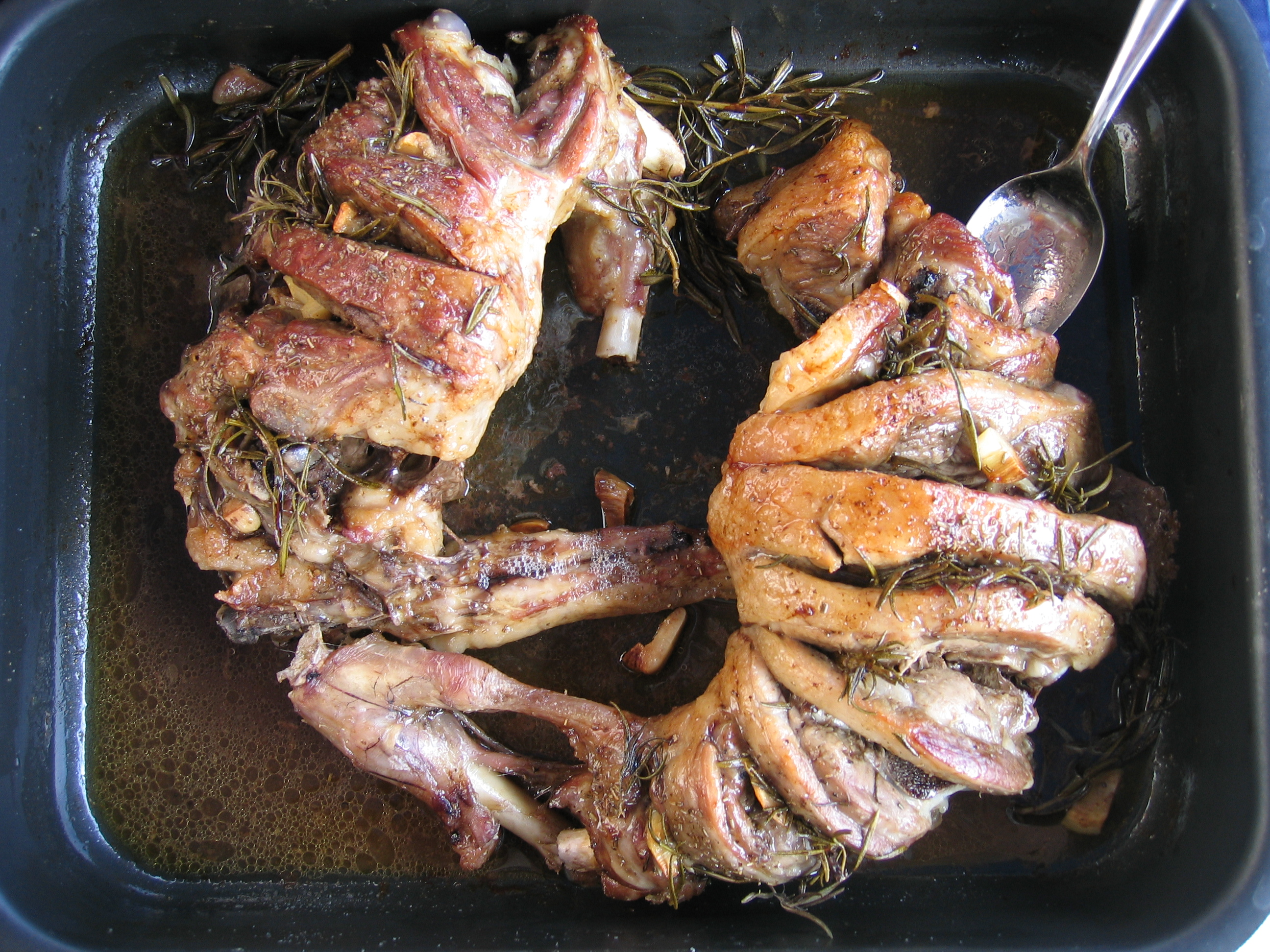
Abbacchio alla romana

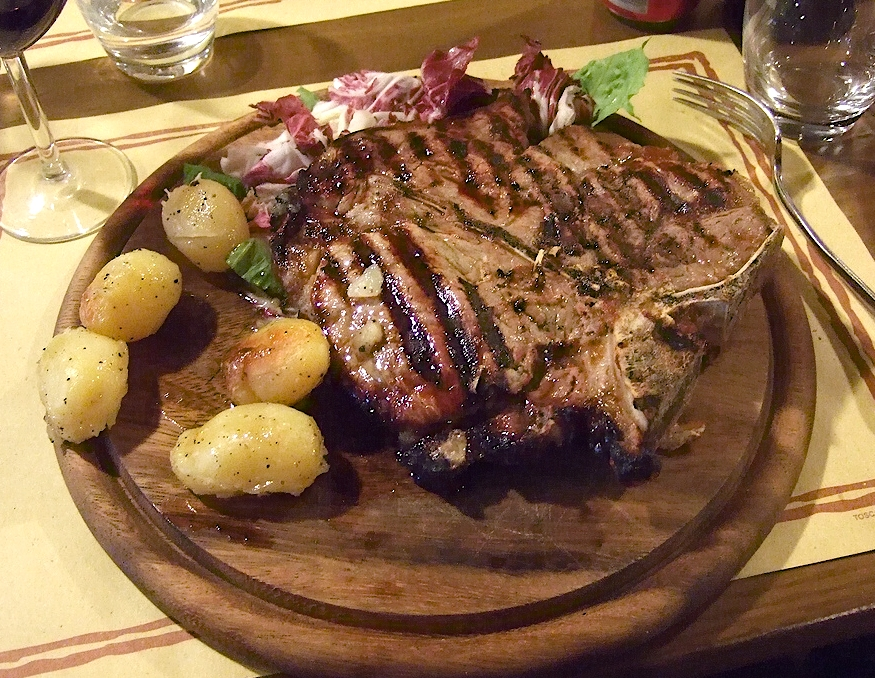
Bistecca alla fiorentina

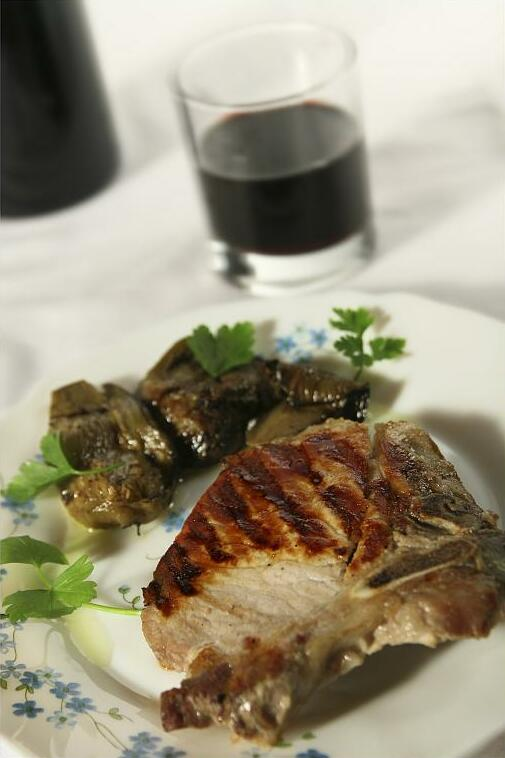
Braciola served with grilled aubergines

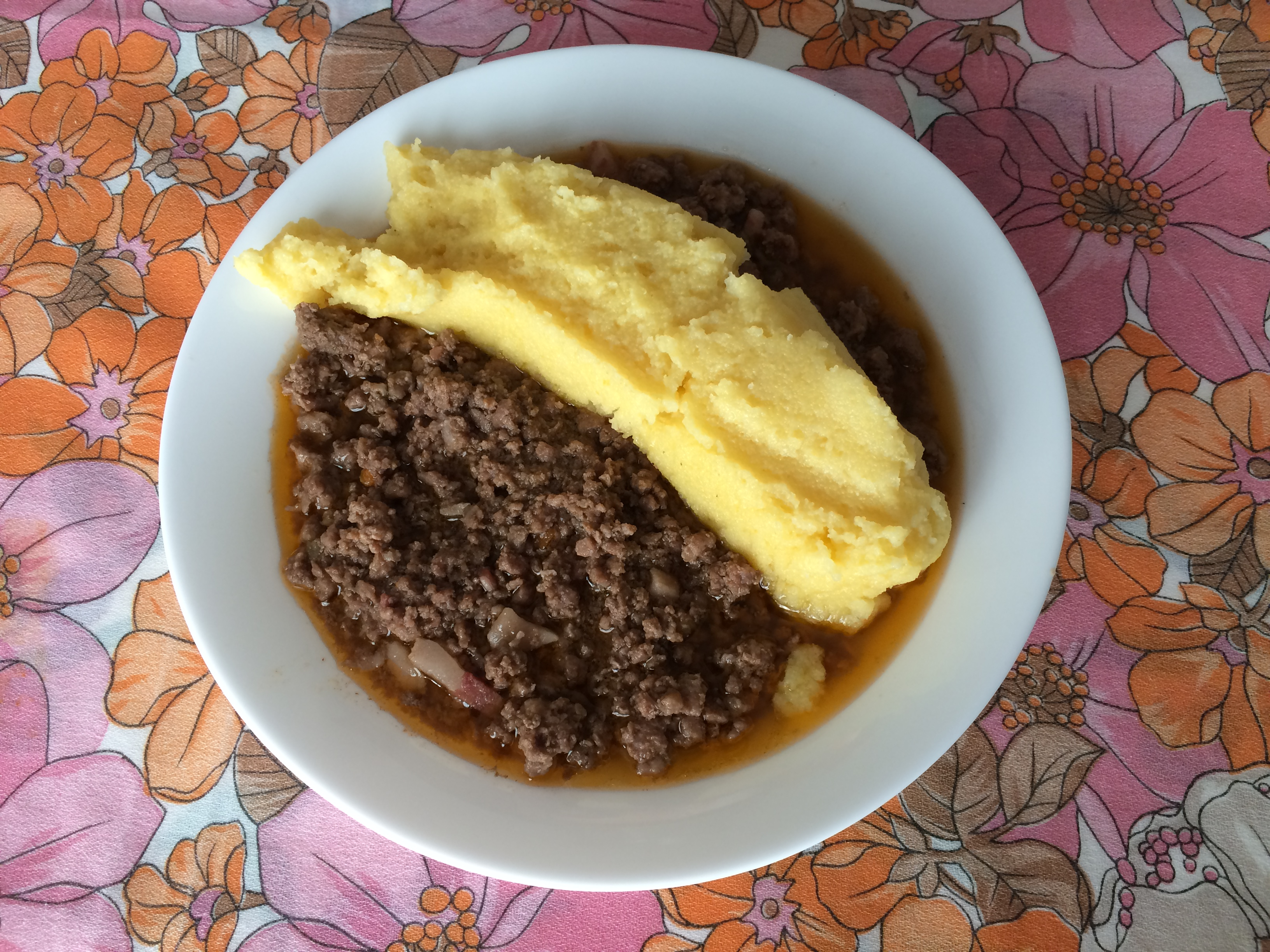
Bruscitti served with polenta

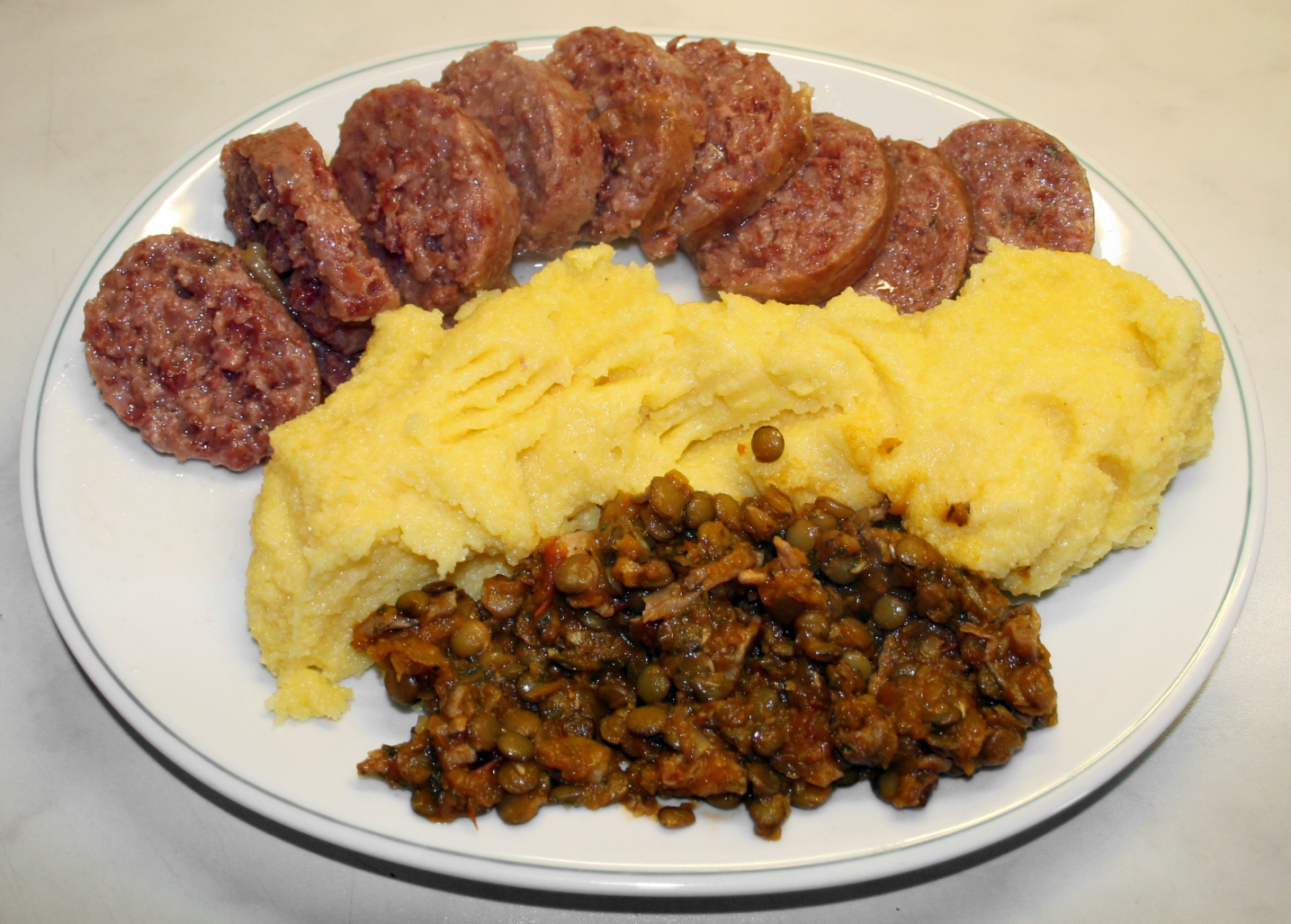
Cotechino, polenta and lentils

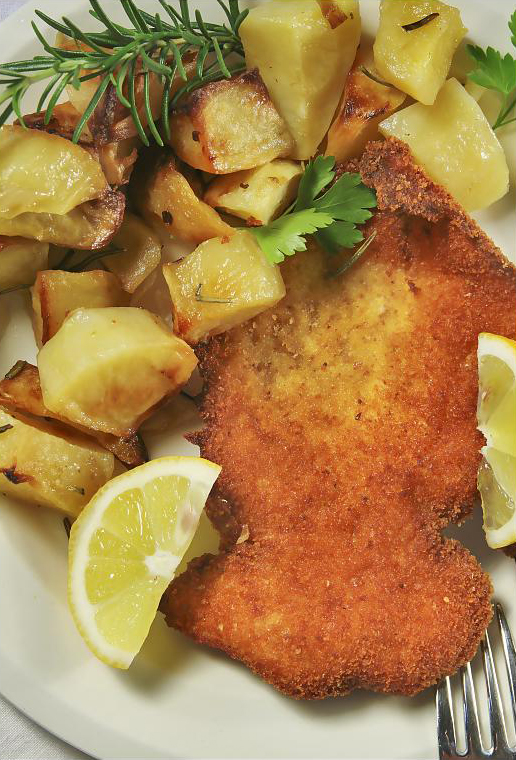
Cotoletta with potatoes

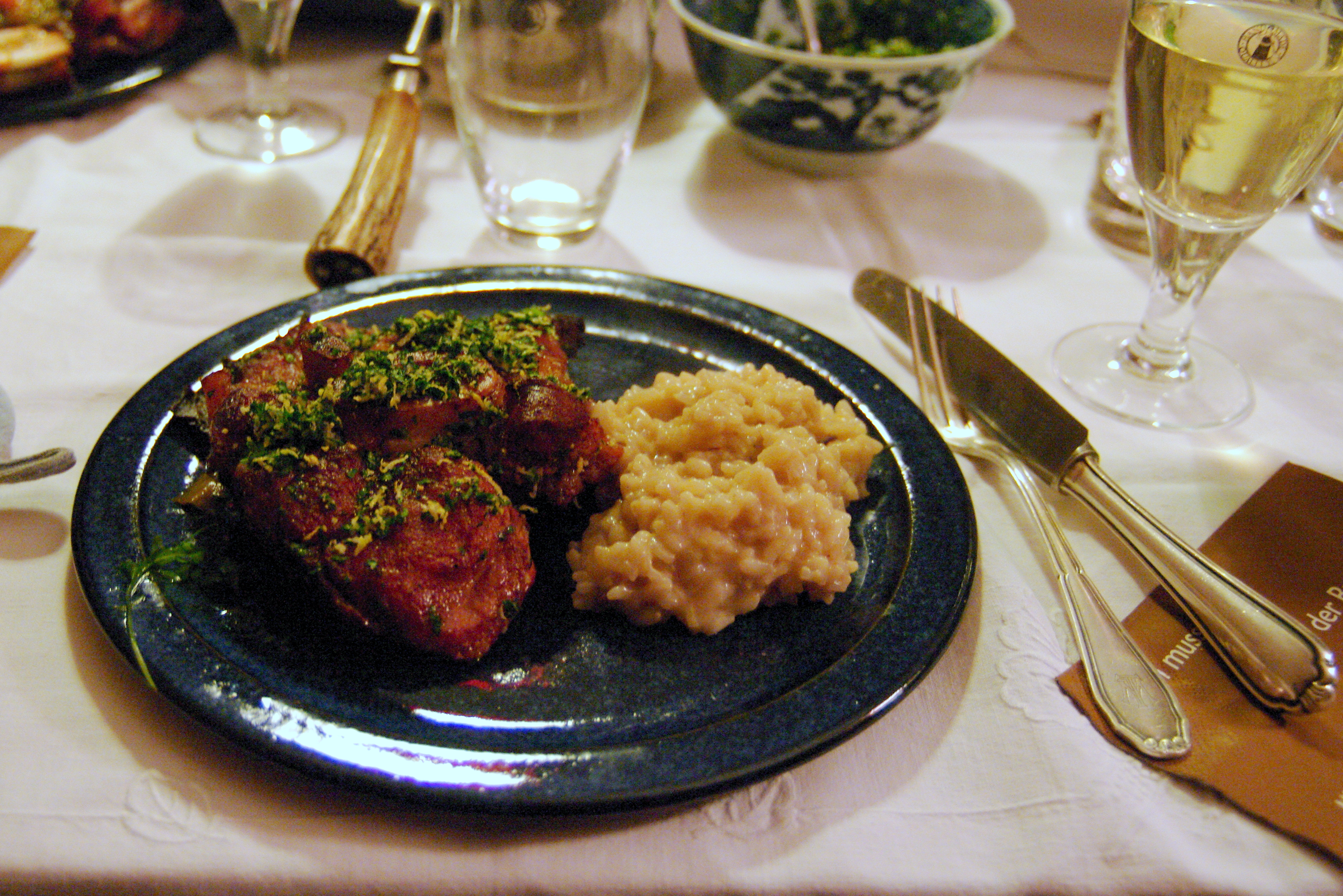
Ossobuco served with risotto alla milanese

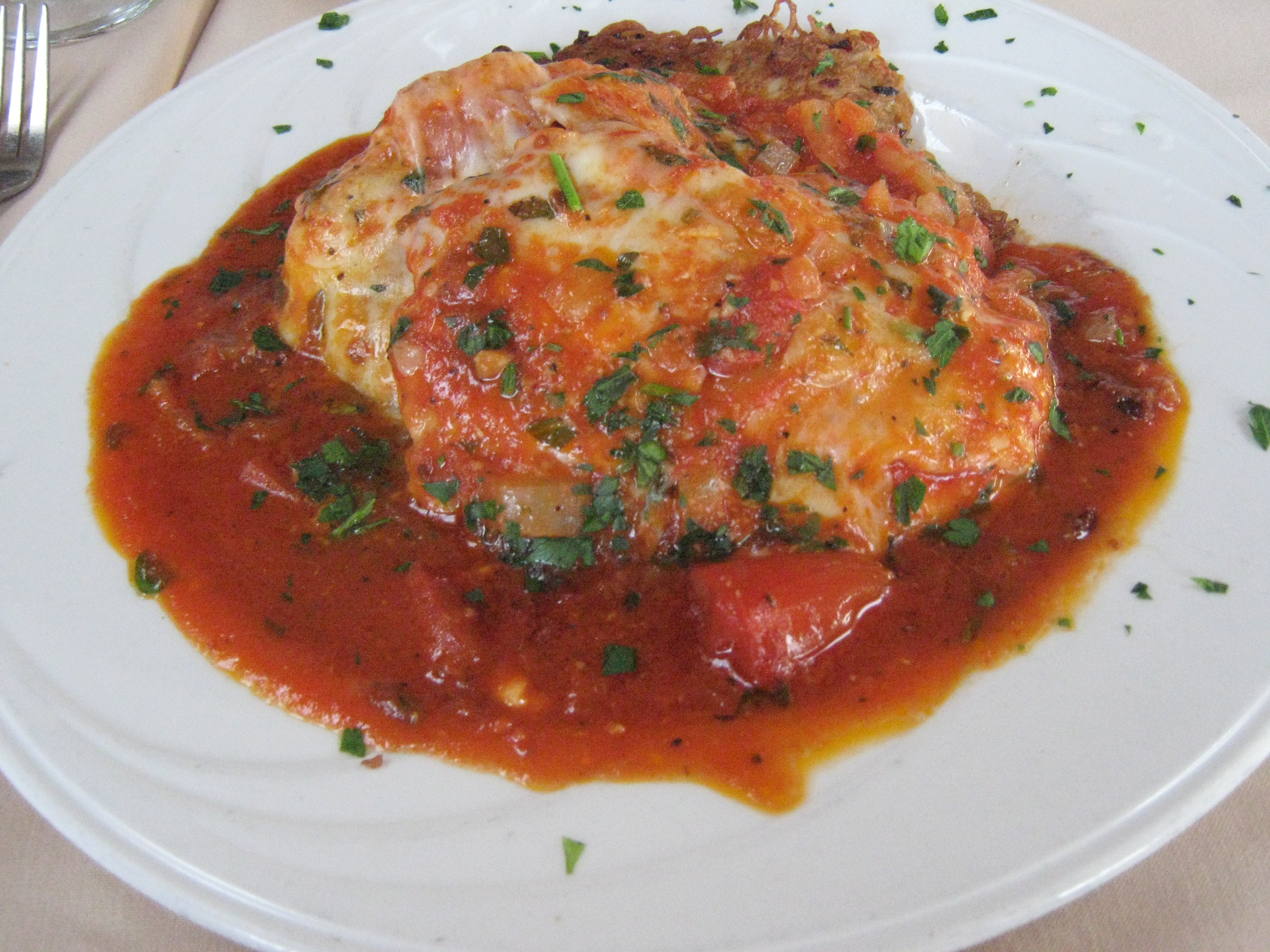
Pizzaiola

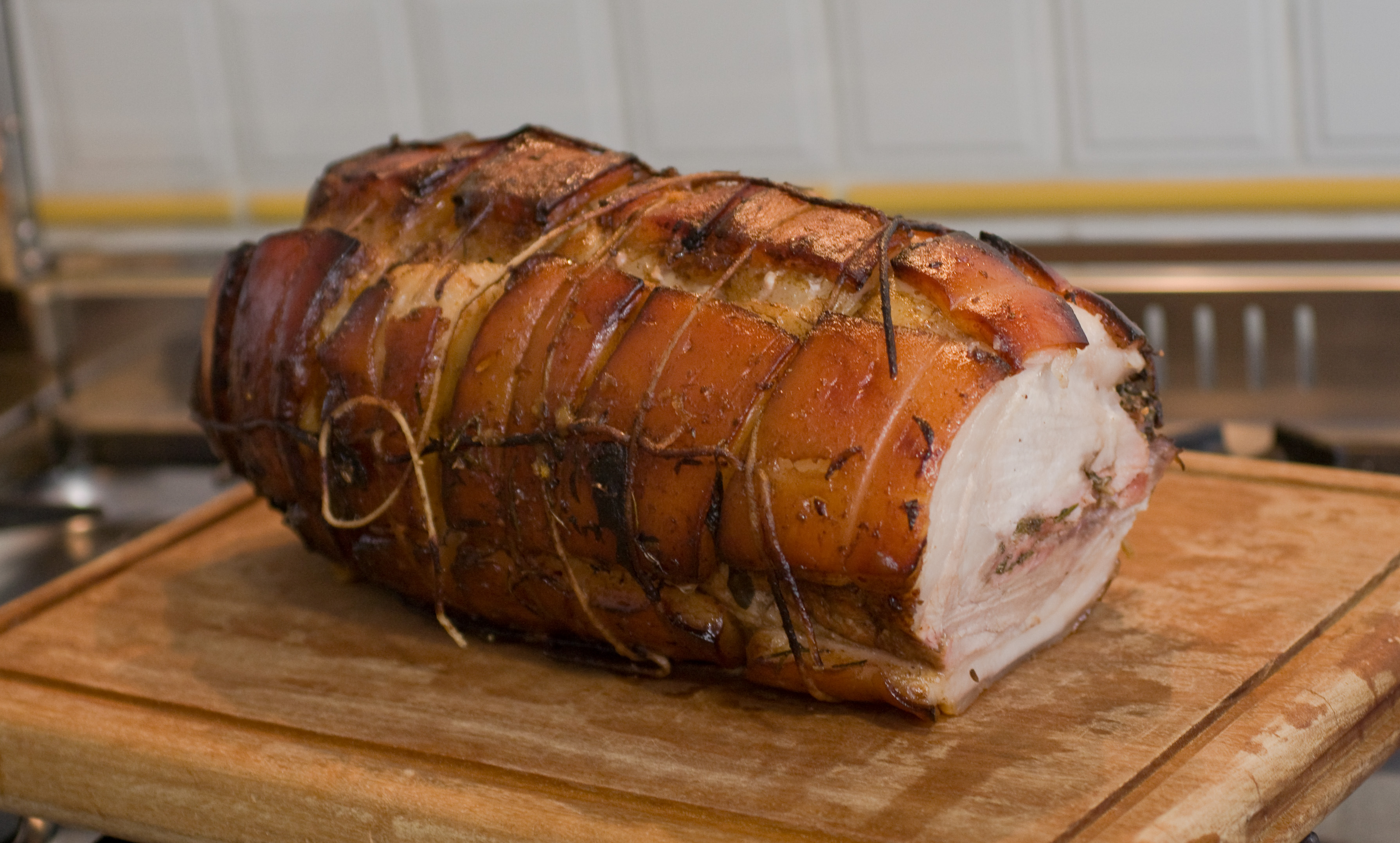
Porchetta

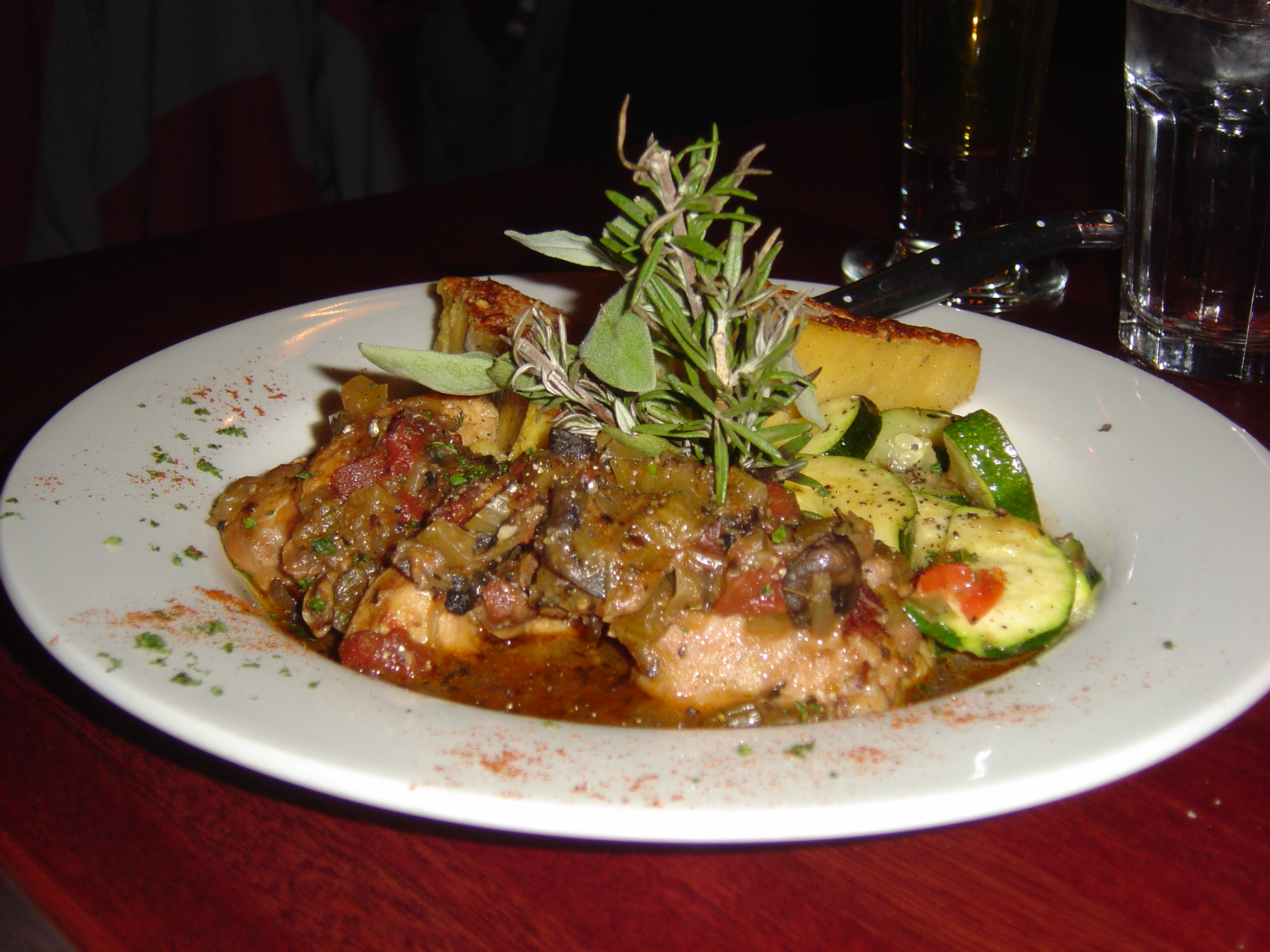
Rabbit cacciatora

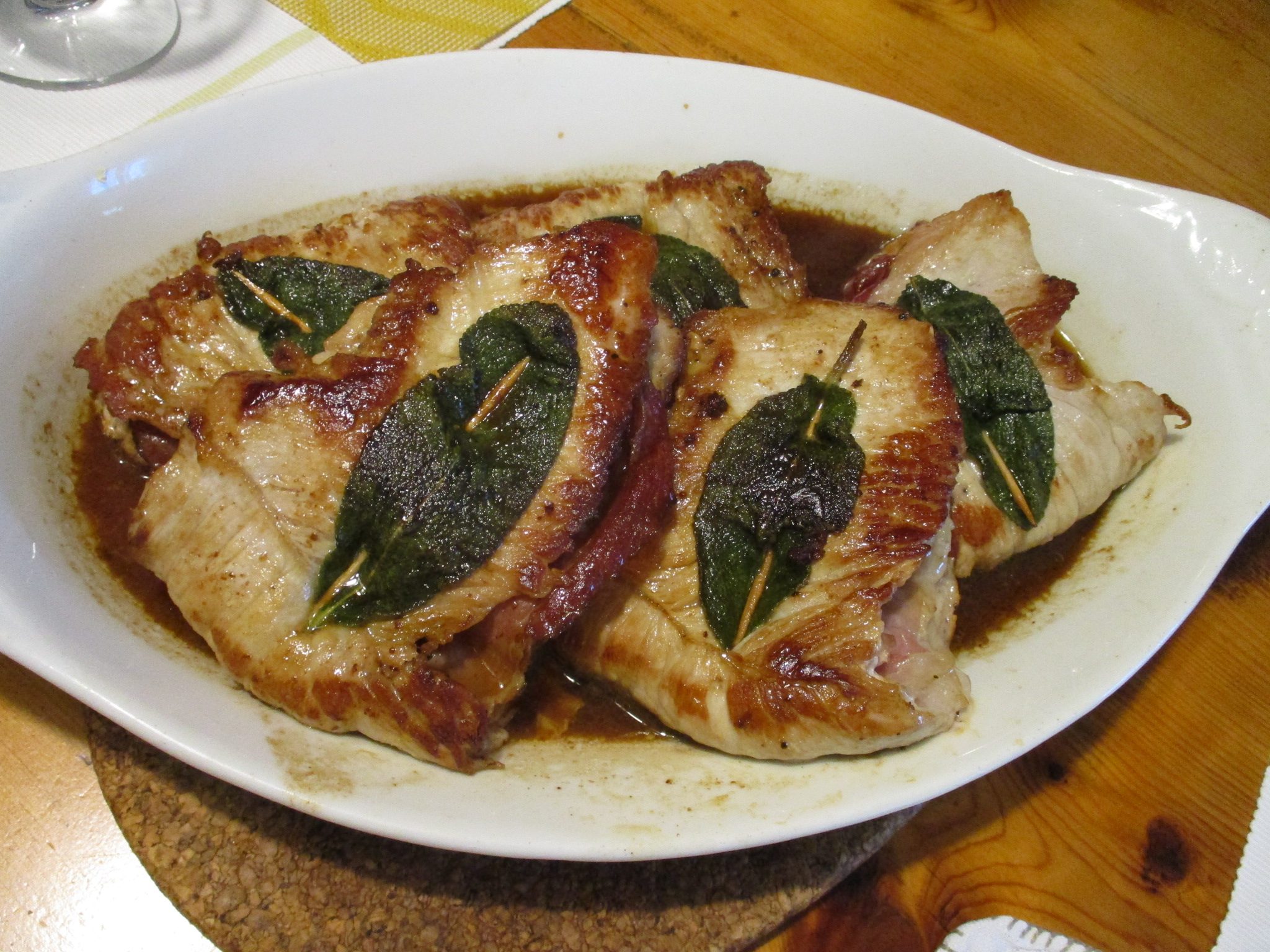
Saltimbocca

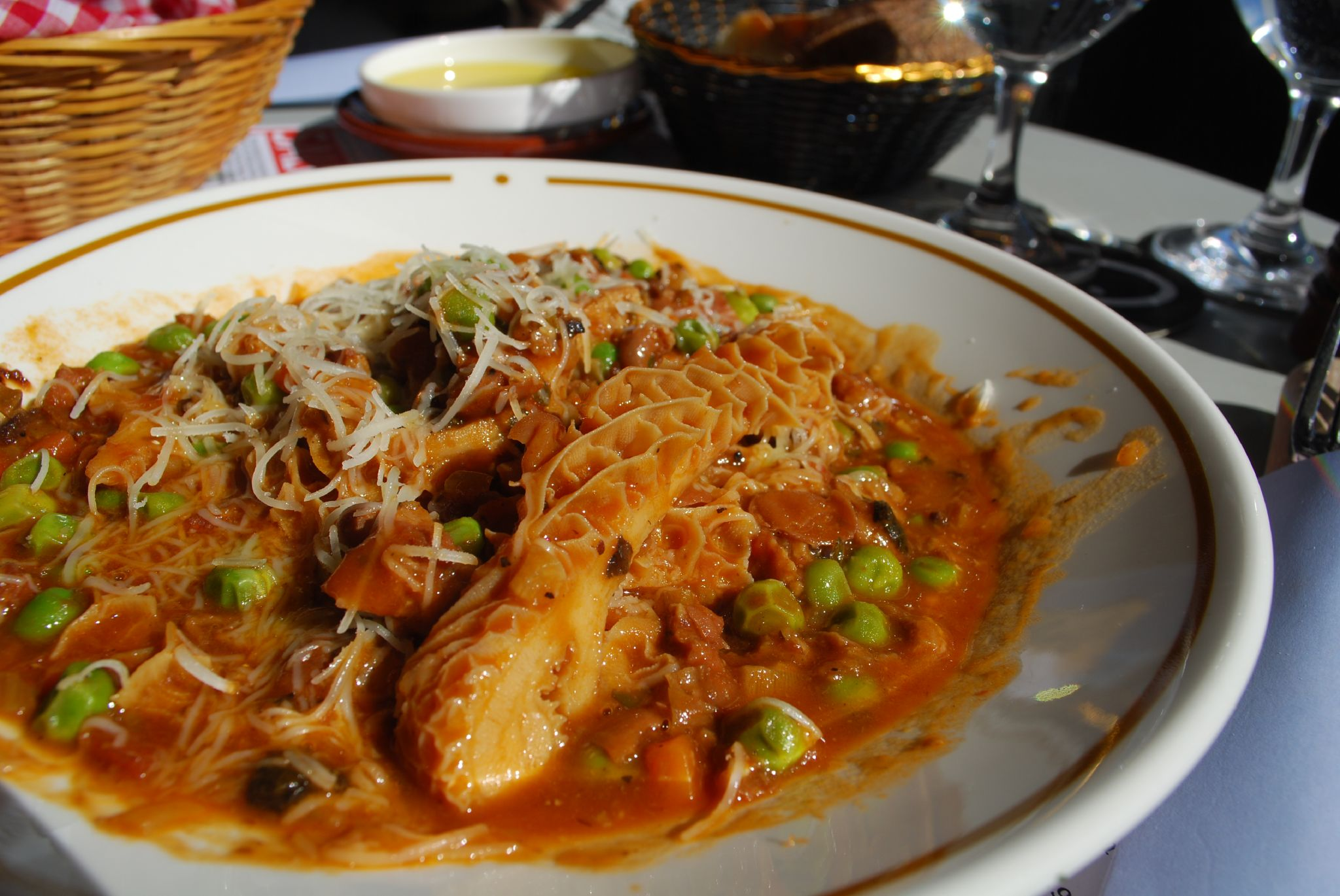
Trippa alla parmigiana

- Abbacchio, abbacchio a scottadito, abbacchio alla cacciatora, abbacchio alla romana
- Agnello al forno con patate, agnello cacio e uova, agnello con olive, agnello in padella, agnello in umido
- Arrosticini
- Barbozzo (Umbrian guanciale)
- Bardiccio
- Batsoà
- Biroldo
- Bistecca alla fiorentina (lit. 'beefsteak Florentine style')
- Bollito misto
- Bombette pugliesi
- Braciola, braciola di maiale
- Braciolone
- Brasato, brasato al vino
- Bresaola, bresaola della Valtellina
- Brodo di carne
- Bruscitti
- Budellacci di interiora
- Cacciatora – refers to a meal prepared "hunter-style" with onions, herbs, usually tomatoes, often bell peppers and sometimes wine.
- Caldume
- Capocollo
- Cappello del prete (or tricorno)
- Capra alla neretese, capra e fagioli
- Capretto al forno
- Carne cruda all'albese
- Carne salada e fasoi
- Cassoeula
- Cervellatine
- Ciarimbolo
- Cima alla genovese
- Coda alla vaccinara
- Coniglio alla sanremese, coniglio all'ischitana
- Coppa di testa, coppa di Parma
- Coppiette
- Cosce di pollo al forno
- Cosce di rana
- Cotechino, cotechino delle Grazie di Curtatone, cotechino e lenticchie, cotechino friulano (or musèt), cotechino in crosta, cotechino Modena
- Cotoletta, cotoletta alla bolognese, cotoletta alla milanese, cotoletta alla palermitana, cotolette in carpione
- Culatello di Zibello, culatello con cotenna (also called culatta or culaccia)
- Farsu magru
- Fegatelli
- Fegato alla veneziana
- Filetto di vitello in mantello di pancetta e verza
- Finocchiona
- Fiocchetto (or fiocco di culatello)
- Frittola
- Frittole
- Fritto misto
- Galantina
- Galletto alla brace, galletto alla griglia, galletto alla piastra
- Gelatina di maiale
- Grigliata mista
- Guanciale
- Gulasch
- Involtini di carne, involtini di cotenna
- Lampredotto
- Lardo, lardo di Colonnata, Vallée d'Aoste Lard d'Arnad
- Lepre in salmì
- Likëngë
- Lonza al latte
- Lucanica, lucanica di Picerno
- Luganega
- Mazzafegato, mazzafegato di Fabriano
- Mazzarelle
- Mondeghili
- Mortadella, mortadella Bologna, mortadella della Val di Non, mortadella della Val d'Ossola, mortadella di Amatrice, mortadella di Camaiore, mortadella di Campotosto, mortadella di cavallo, mortadella di fegato (or fidighin), mortadella di Prato, mortadella trequandina, mortadella umbra
- Motsetta
- Muscisca
- 'Nduja
- Oca in onto
- 'O pere e 'o musso (lit. 'the foot and the muzzle')
- Oseleti scapadi
- Ossobuco alla fiorentina, ossobuco alla milanese, ossobuco alla romana
- Padellaccia di maiale
- Pagliata
- Pancetta, pancetta di Calabria, pancetta piacentina
- Pani câ meusa
- Paninu cu satizzu
- Pastin
- Pastissada de caval
- Pecora alla callara
- Pezzetti di cavallo
- Piccata
- Pitina
- Pizzaiola (also known as carne alla pizzaiola)
- Polenta e osei
- Pollo alla birra, pollo alla cacciatora, pollo alla potentina
- Polpette al sugo
- Porceddu (or porcheddu)
- Porchetta, porchetta abruzzese, porchetta trevigiana
- Prosciutto amatriciano, prosciutto cotto (lit. 'cooked ham'), prosciutto cotto affumicato (lit. 'smoked cooked ham'), prosciutto crudo, prosciutto crudo di Cuneo, prosciutto del Montefeltro, prosciutto di agnello, prosciutto di Carpegna, prosciutto di Modena, prosciutto di Norcia, prosciutto di Parma, prosciutto di San Daniele, prosciutto di Sauris, prosciutto toscano, Prosciutto Veneto (or Prosciutto Veneto Berico-Euganeo)
- Prosciutto e melone
- Rosticciana, rosticciata trentina (or Gröstl)
- Rovelline lucchesi
- Salama da sugo
- Salame, salame all'aglio, salame ciauscolo, salame cotto (lit. 'cooked salami'), salame del Montefeltro, salame di cavallo, salame di Fabriano, salame di Varzi, salame Felino, salame genovese di Sant'Olcese, salame gentile, salame lardellato, salame mantovano, salame Milano, salame sotto grasso, salame strolghino, salame toscano, salame ungherese
- Salamini italiani alla cacciatora
- Salsiccia (lit. 'sausage'), salsiccia cruda, (lit. 'raw sausage'), salsiccia di Bra, salsiccia di Calabria
- Saltimbocca
- Sanguinaccio
- Scaloppine, scaloppine al limone, scaloppine alla romana
- Sfilacci di cavallo
- Slinzega
- Soperzata di Rivello
- Soppressata, soppressata bresciana, soppressata cilentana, soppressata del Molise, soppressata del Vallo di Diano, soppressata di Calabria, soppressata di Decollatura (or soppressata della Presila), soppressata di Ricigliano, soppressata toscana (or capofreddo, capaccia, soprassata)
- Sopressa, sopressa di Asiago, sopressa di cavallo, soppressa friulana, sopressa trevigiana, sopressa vicentina
- Spalla di San Secondo
- Speck Alto Adige, speck di Sauris
- Spezzatino, spezzatino di musso
- Stecchi alla genovese
- Stigghiola
- Straccetti, of various varieties
- Stracotto alla piacentina
- Strutto
- Testa in cassetta
- Torcinello
- Torresani allo spiedo (piccioni allo spiedo)
- Trippa, trippa alla milanese (or busecca), trippa alla parmigiana, trippa alla romana, trippa alla veneta
- Valle d'Aosta Jambon de Bosses
- Ventresca di maiale
- Ventricina
- Vitello in fricandò, vitello tonnato
- Zampina
- Zampone Modena

=== Vegetable dishes ===
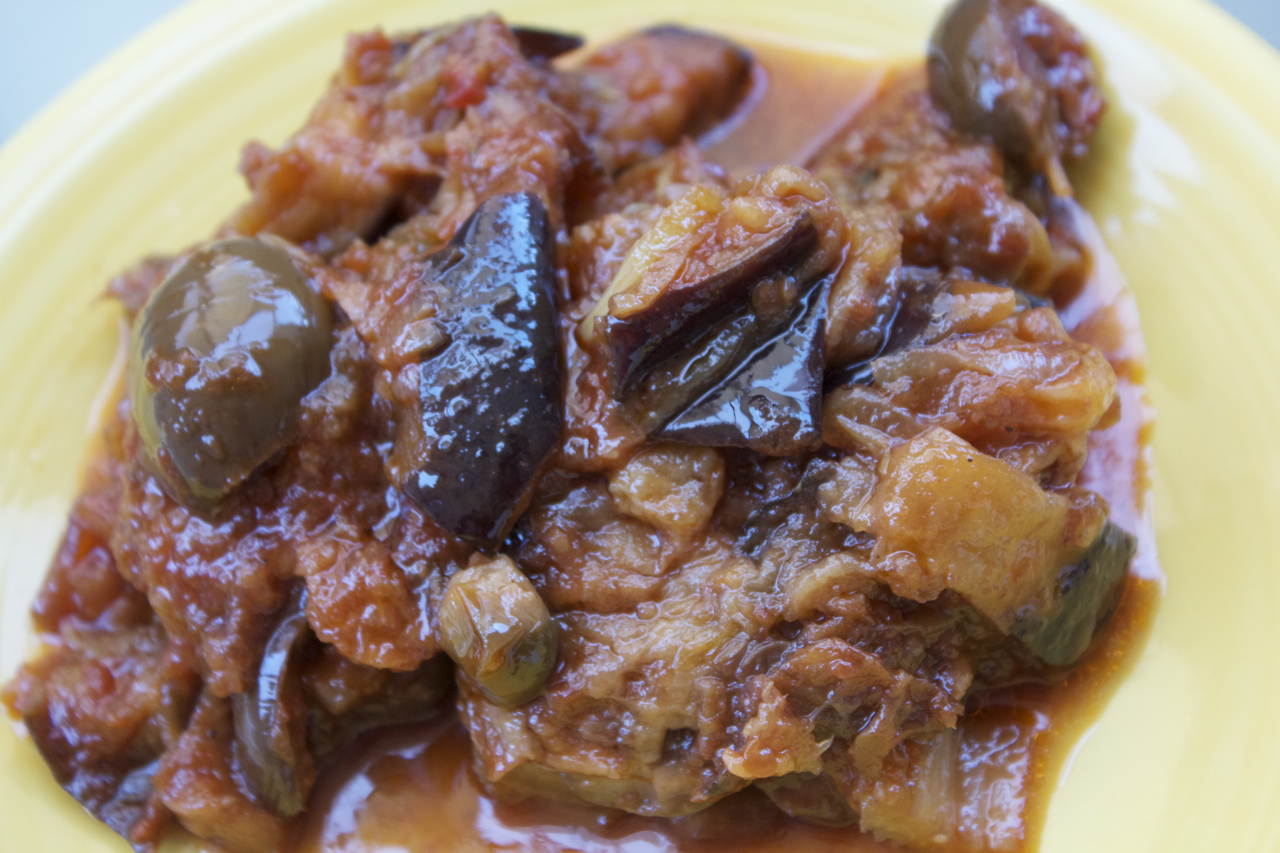
Caponata

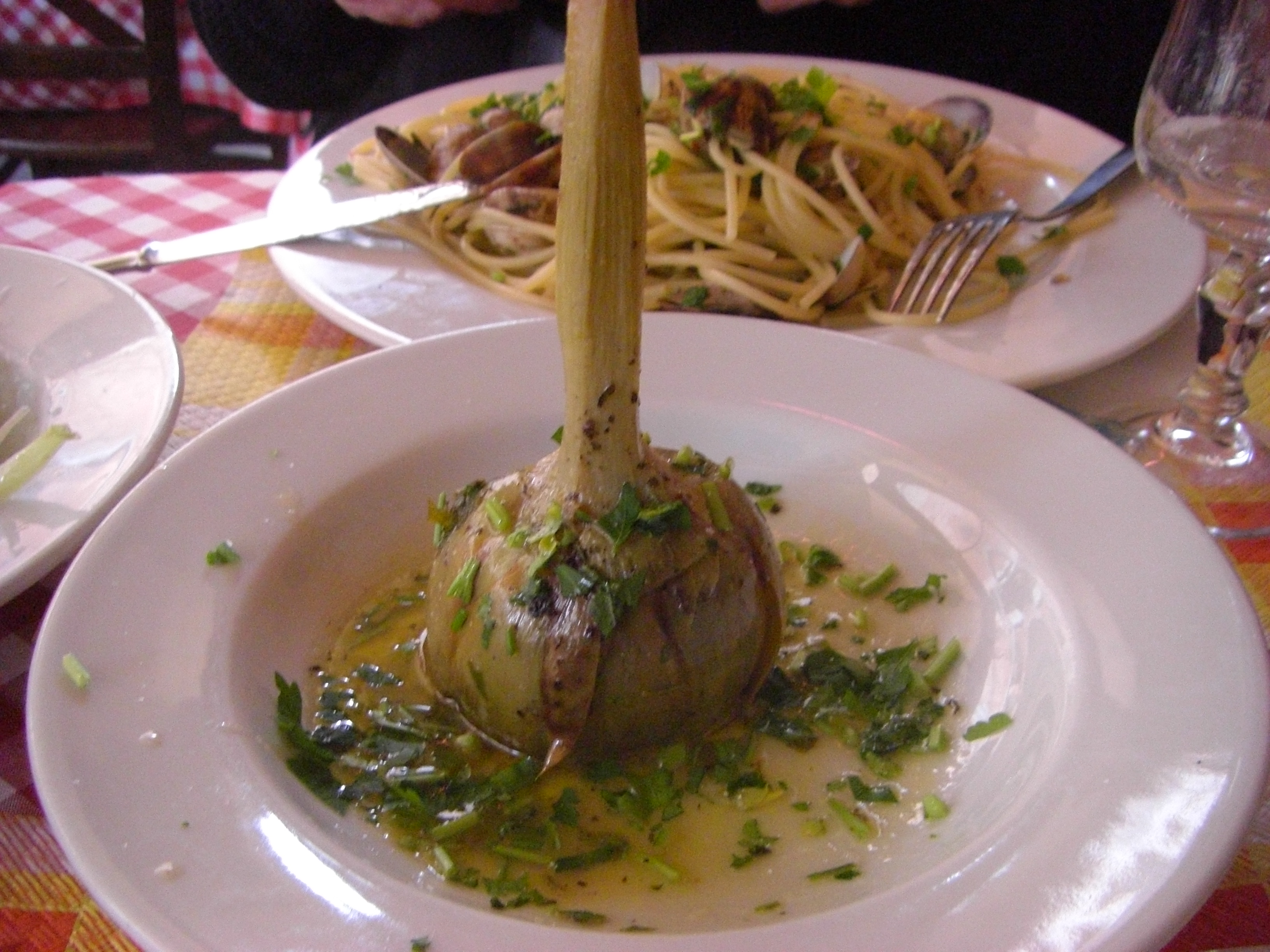
Carciofi alla romana

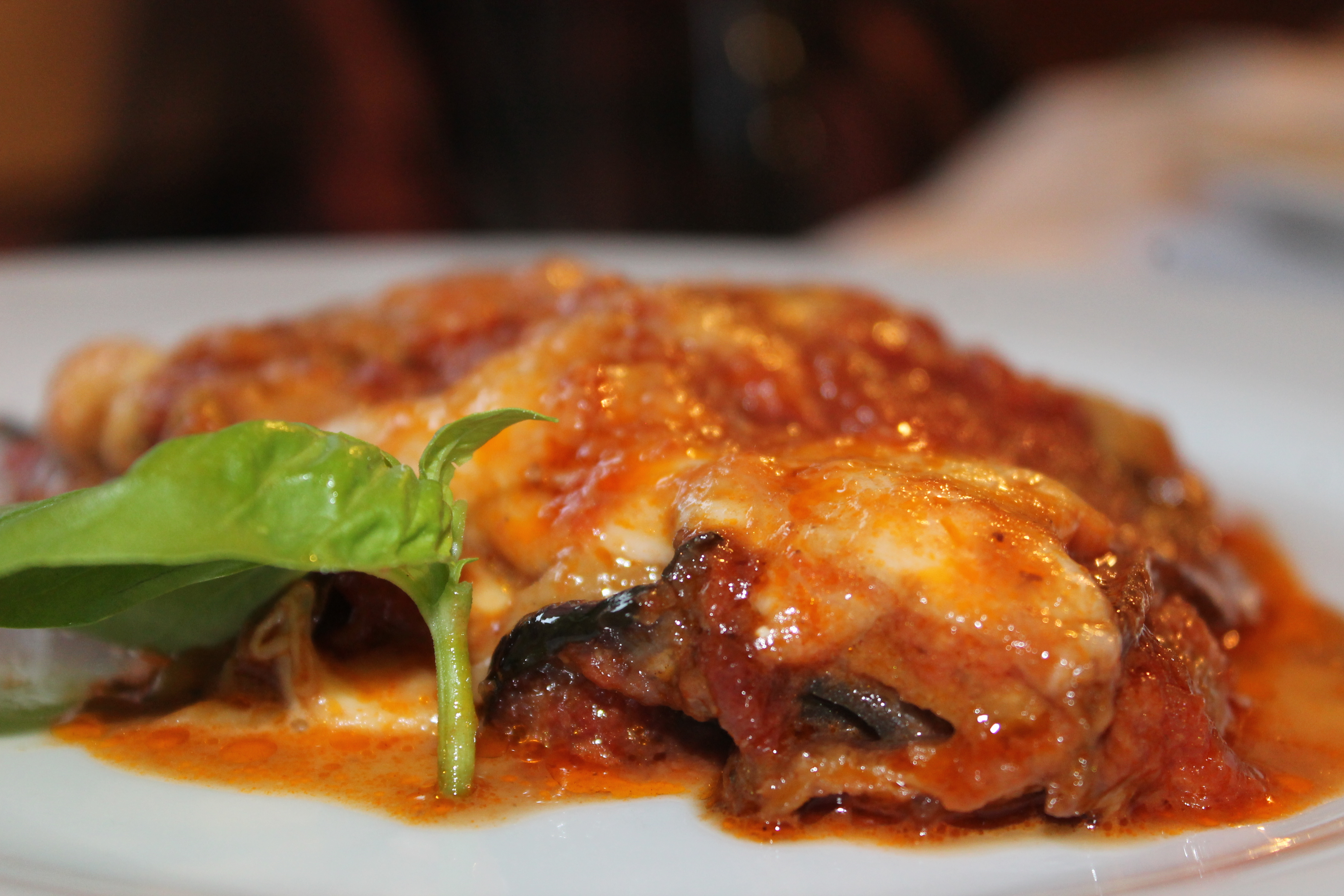
Parmigiana di melanzane

- Acciughe al verde
- Acquasale
- Caponata, caponatina
- Carciofi alla giudia, carciofi alla romana
- Ciambotta
- Crauti (sauerkraut)
- Erbazzone (or scarpazzone)
- Fave e cicoria, fave stufate
- Fiori di zucca fritti in pastella
- Giardiniera
- Insalata caprese (lit. 'caprese salad'), insalata di arance (lit. 'orange salad'), insalata di ceci, insalata di pomodori, insalata di rinforzo, insalata pantesca (lit. 'Pantesca salad')
- Macco di fave
- Melanzane a barchetta, melanzane a funghetto, melanzane alla scapece, melanzane fritte, melanzane grigliate, melanzane ripiene
- Panzanella
- Parmigiana di melanzane
- Peperonata
- Peperoncini verdi fritti
- Peperoni in padella, peperoni ripieni, peperoni ripieni alla calabrese (pipi chini)
- Pizza di scarola
- Polpette di melanzane, polpettone di melanzane
- Radicchio al forno, radicchio alla piastra
- Rollatini
- Zucchine alla scapece

=== Nut dishes ===
- Chestnut pie – has been documented back to the 15th century in Italy, in the book De honesta voluptate et valetudine (English: On honest indulgence and good health) written by the Italian writer and gastronomist Bartolomeo Platina.

=== Wines ===
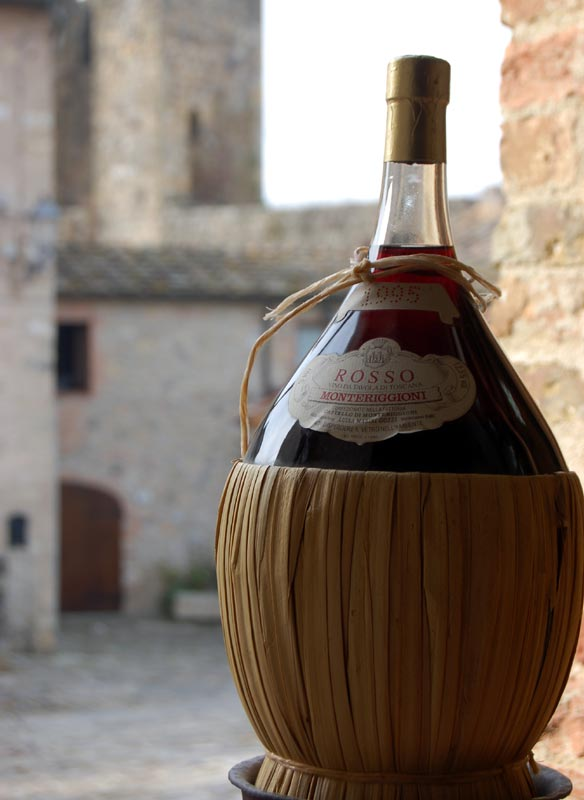
Tuscan Chianti in a traditional fiasco

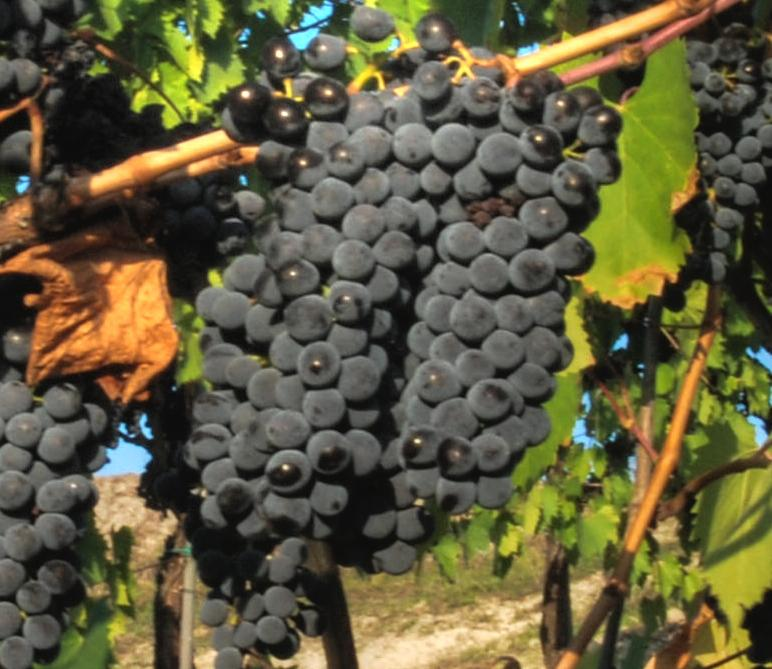
Sangiovese grapes

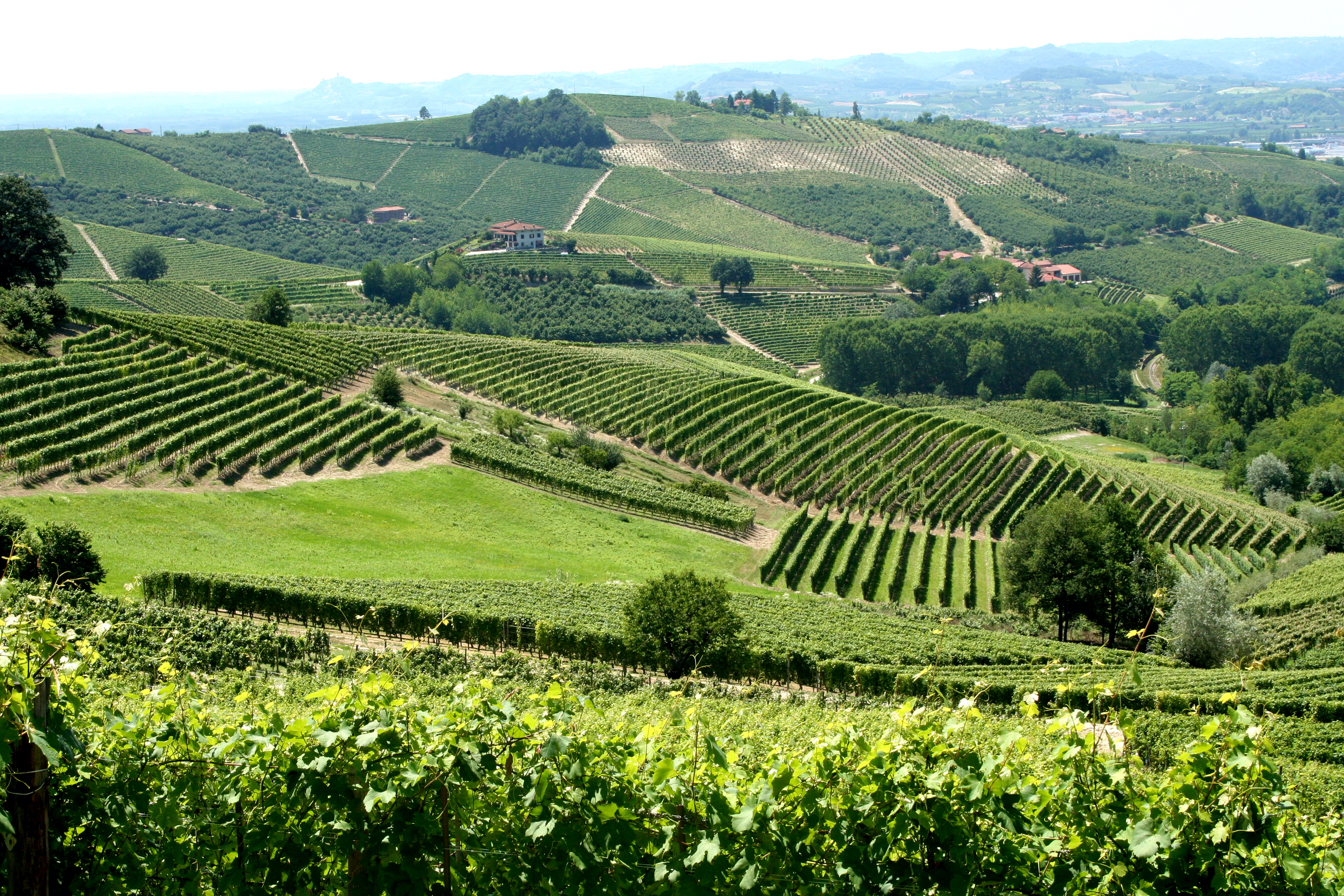
Vineyards in Langhe and Montferrat, Piedmont, the official name of a UNESCO World Heritage Site comprising "five distinct wine-growing areas with outstanding landscapes" plus the Castle of Grinzane Cavour in the Piedmont region, Italy.

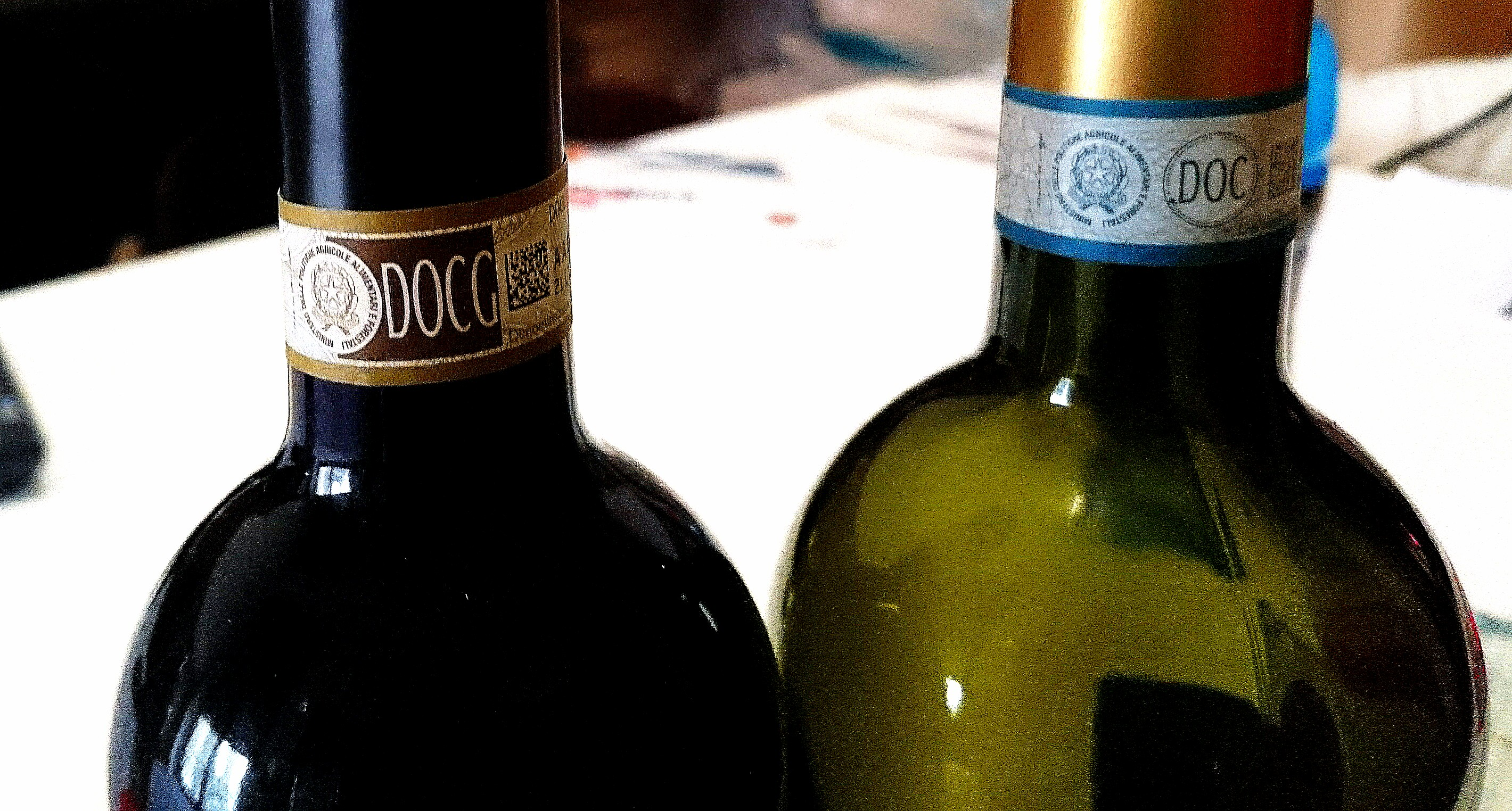
DOCG and DOC labels on two Italian wine bottles

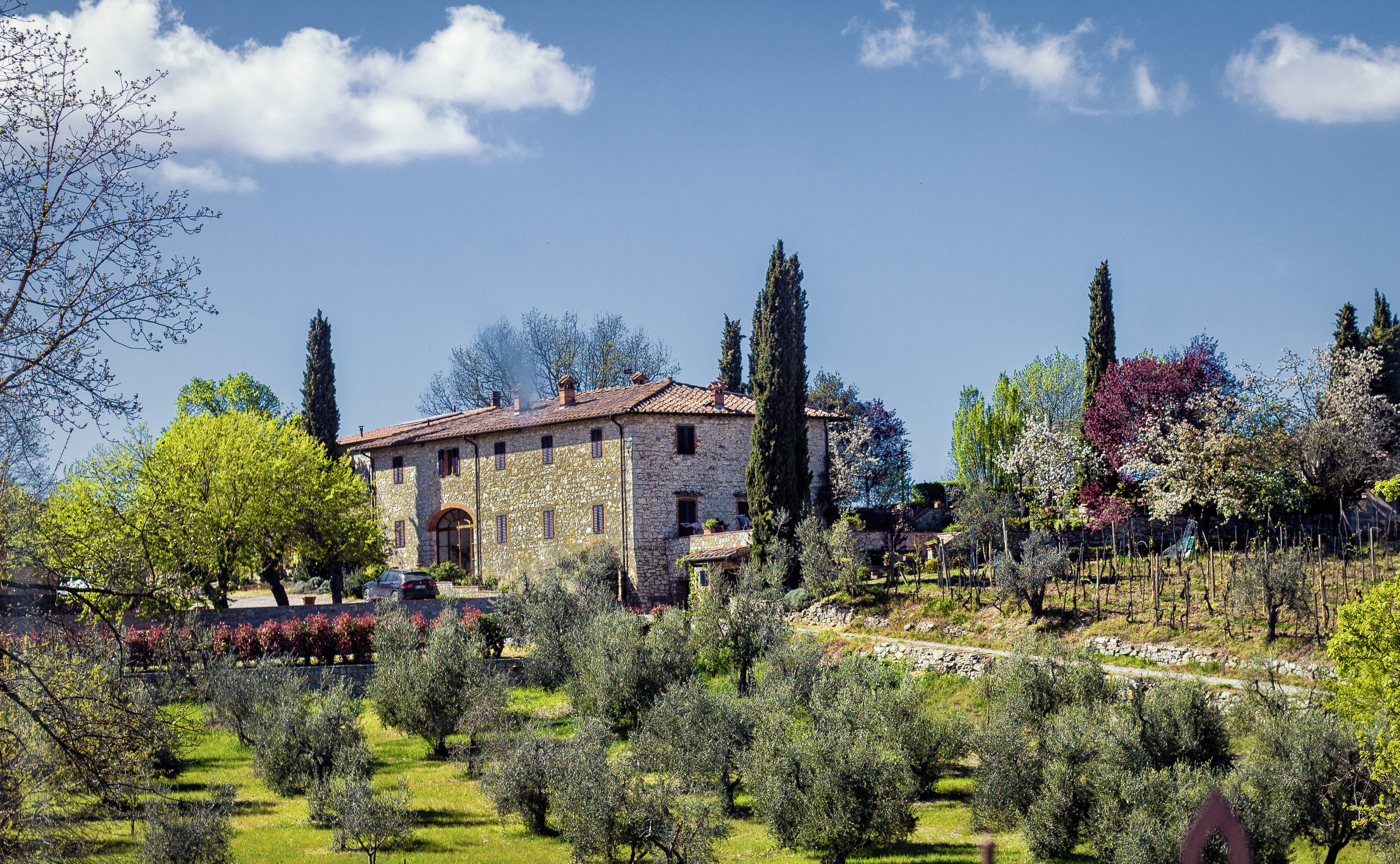
Poggio Amorelli, a typical winery of Chianti region

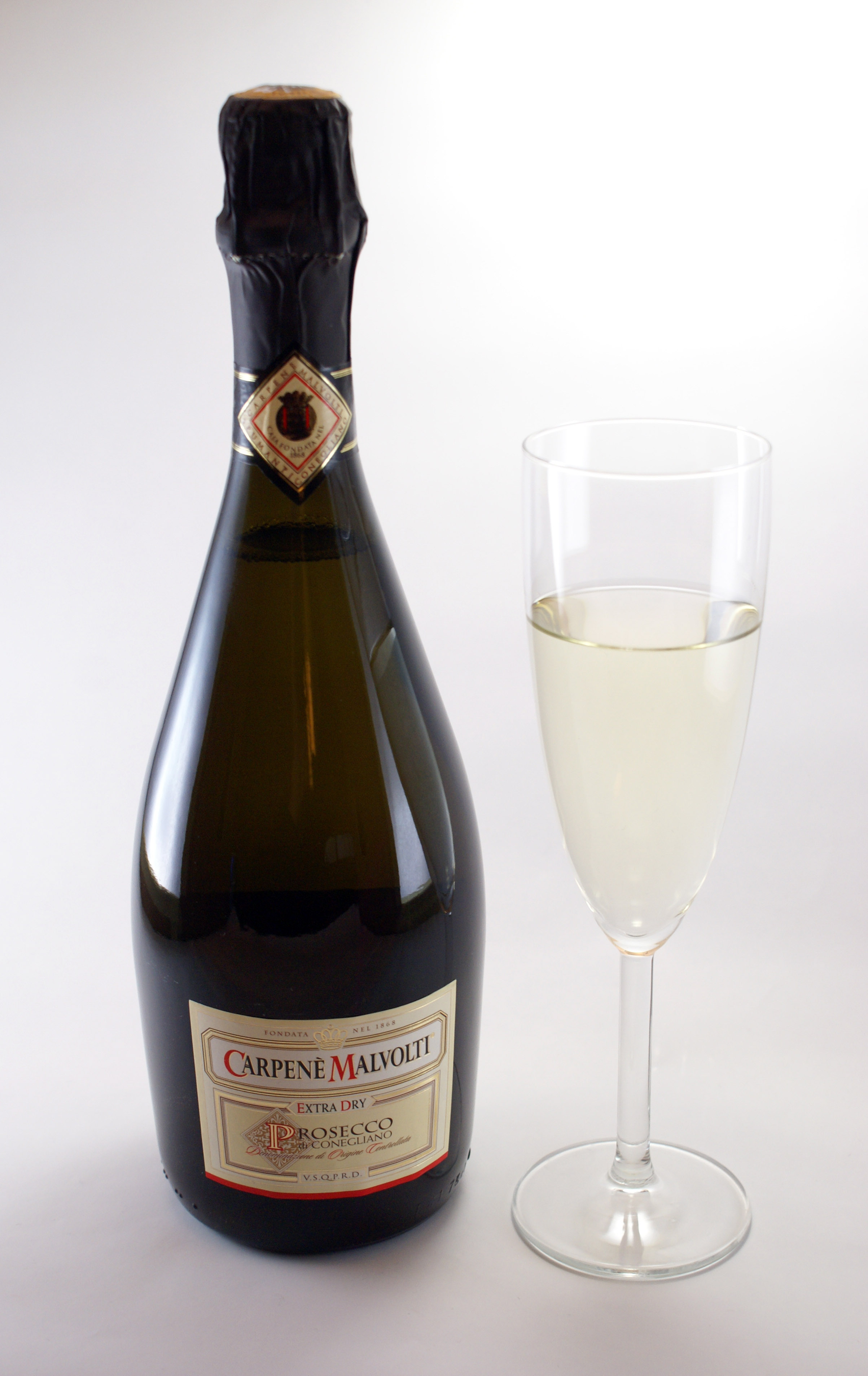
A bottle of Prosecco di Conegliano spumante extra dry and a glass of Prosecco frizzante, which stops forming bubbles soon after it is poured

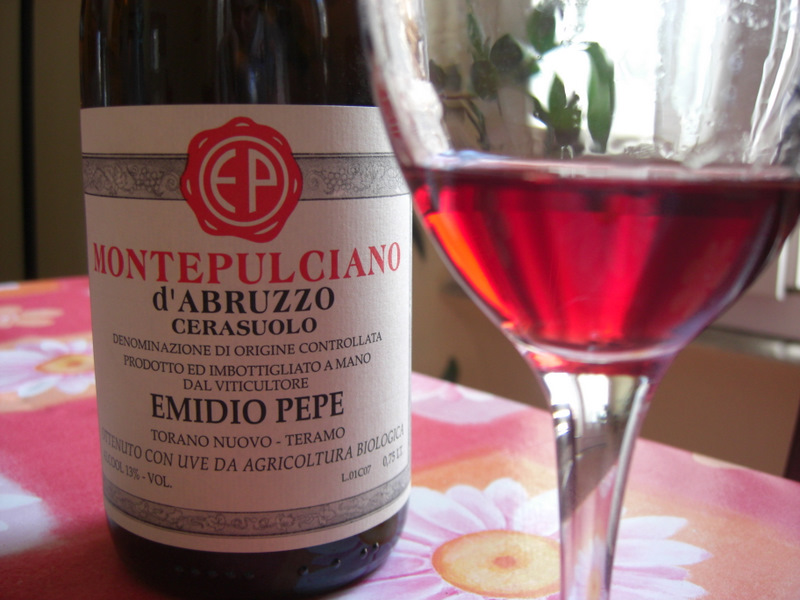
A Montepulciano d'Abruzzo wine made from the Montepulciano grape, in the Abruzzo region

- Abruzzo
  - Montepulciano d'Abruzzo
  - Trebbiano d'Abruzzo
- Apulia
  - Malvasia
  - Negroamaro
- Basilicata
  - Aglianico del Vulture
  - Grottino di Roccanova
  - Matera
  - Terre dell'Alta Val d'Agri
- Calabria
  - Cirò
- Campania
  - Aglianico del Taburno
  - Campi Flegrei Piedirosso
  - Falanghina
  - Falerno del Massico
  - Fiano di Avellino
  - Greco di Tufo
  - Lacryma Christi
  - Solopaca
  - Taurasi
- Emilia-Romagna
  - Albana
  - Bonarda
  - Gutturnio
  - Lambrusco
  - Pignoletto
  - Sangiovese
  - Trebbiano
- Friuli-Venezia Giulia
  - Friulano
  - Pignolo
  - Ramandolo
  - Refosco dal peduncolo rosso
  - Ribolla Gialla
  - Schiopettino
  - Tazzelenghe
  - Verduzzo friulano
- Lazio
  - Marino
- Liguria
  - Cinque Terre
- Lombardy
  - Oltrepò Pavese
  - Barbera
  - Bonarda
  - Conero
  - Franciacorta
  - Sassella
  - Grumello
  - Inferno
- Marche
  - Colli Maceratesi
  - Falerio dei Colli Ascolani
  - Rosso Piceno Superiore
  - Spumante Brut
  - Valcalepio
- Piedmont
  - Acqui
  - Alba
  - Asti
  - Barolo
  - Carema Riserva
  - Colli Tortonesi
  - Gattinara
  - Gavi
  - Grignolino
  - Langhe
  - Monferrato
  - Nebbiolo
  - Nizza
  - Ovada
- Sardinia
  - Cagliari
  - Cannonau
  - Monti
  - Nuragus
  - Ogliastra
- Sicily
  - Cerasuolo di Vittoria
  - Donna Fugata
  - Etna DOC
  - Noto
  - Passito di Pantelleria
  - Marsala
  - Nero d'Avola
- Trentino
  - Marzemino
- Tuscany
  - Bolgheri
  - Brunello di Montalcino
  - Carmignano
  - Chianti
  - Colli Apuani
  - Colli Etruria Centrale
  - Colline Lucchesi
  - Elba
  - Montalcino
  - Montescudaio
  - Moscadello di Montalcino
  - Nipozzano
  - Parrina
  - Pitigliano
  - San Gimignano
  - Scansano
  - Val di Chiana
  - Val di Cornia
  - Valdinievole
  - Valle di Arbia
  - Vino Nobile di Montepulciano
  - Vin Santo Toscano (or Vin Santo)
- Umbria
  - Grechetto
  - Orvieto
  - Rosso di Montefalco
  - Sagrantino
  - Torgiano
- Veneto
  - Amarone
  - Bardolino
  - Colli Euganei
  - Conegliano Veneto
  - Custoza
  - Fragolino
  - Prosecco
  - Soave
  - Valdobbiadene
  - Valpolicella

=== Liqueurs ===
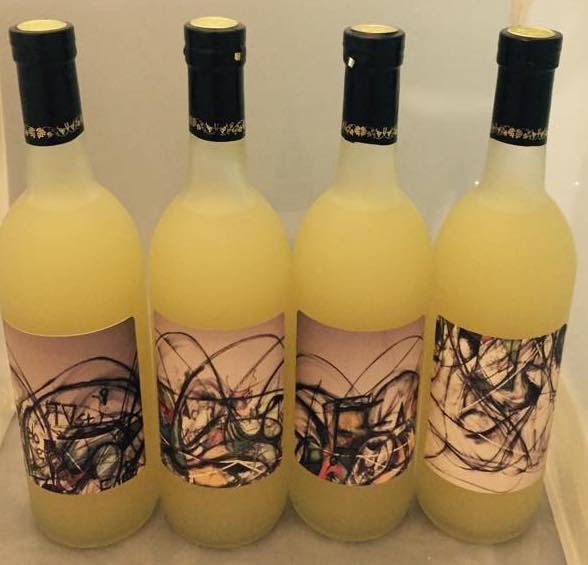
Bottles of limoncello

- Amaretto
- Amaro
- Amaro Averna
- Amaro Lucano
- Amaro Montenegro
- Ammazzacaffè
- Anisetta
- Arancello
- Centerbe
- Disaronno Originale
- Fernet
- Gentian liqueur
- Genziana liqueur (or genziana)
- Italicus Rosolio di Bergamotto
- Limoncello
- Liquore Strega
- Nocello
- Nocino
- Rosolio
- Sambuca
- Vecchio Amaro del Capo
- Vespetrò

=== Cheeses ===
Considering the large number of Italian cheeses, only the most famous ones are listed below.

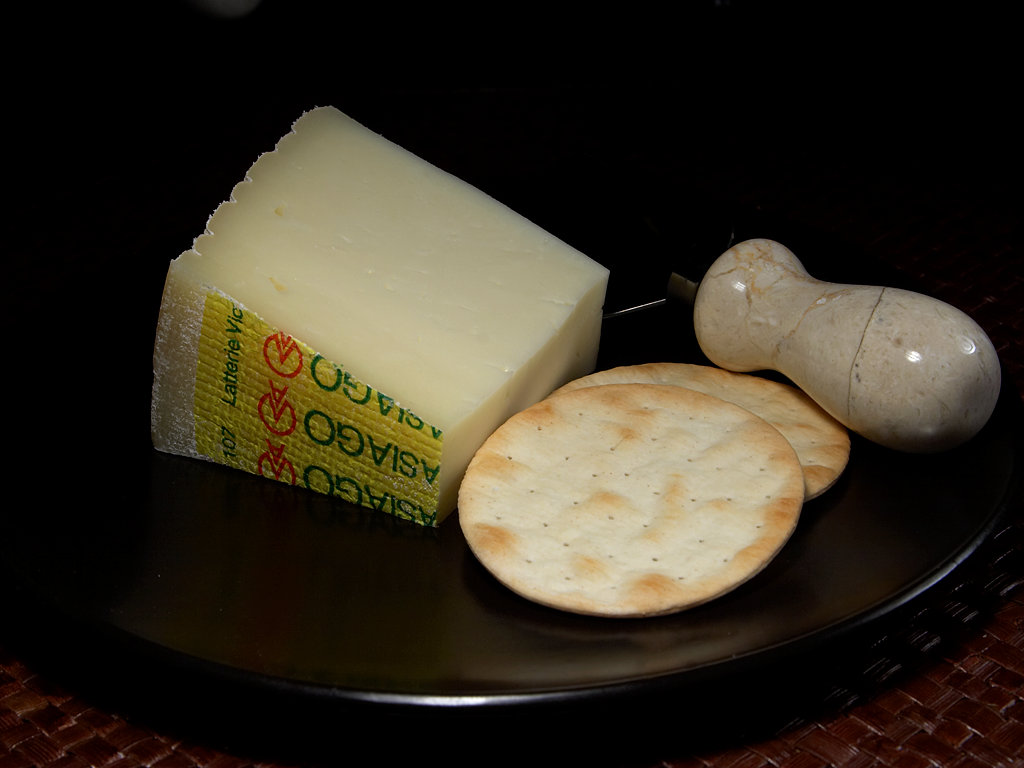
Asiago

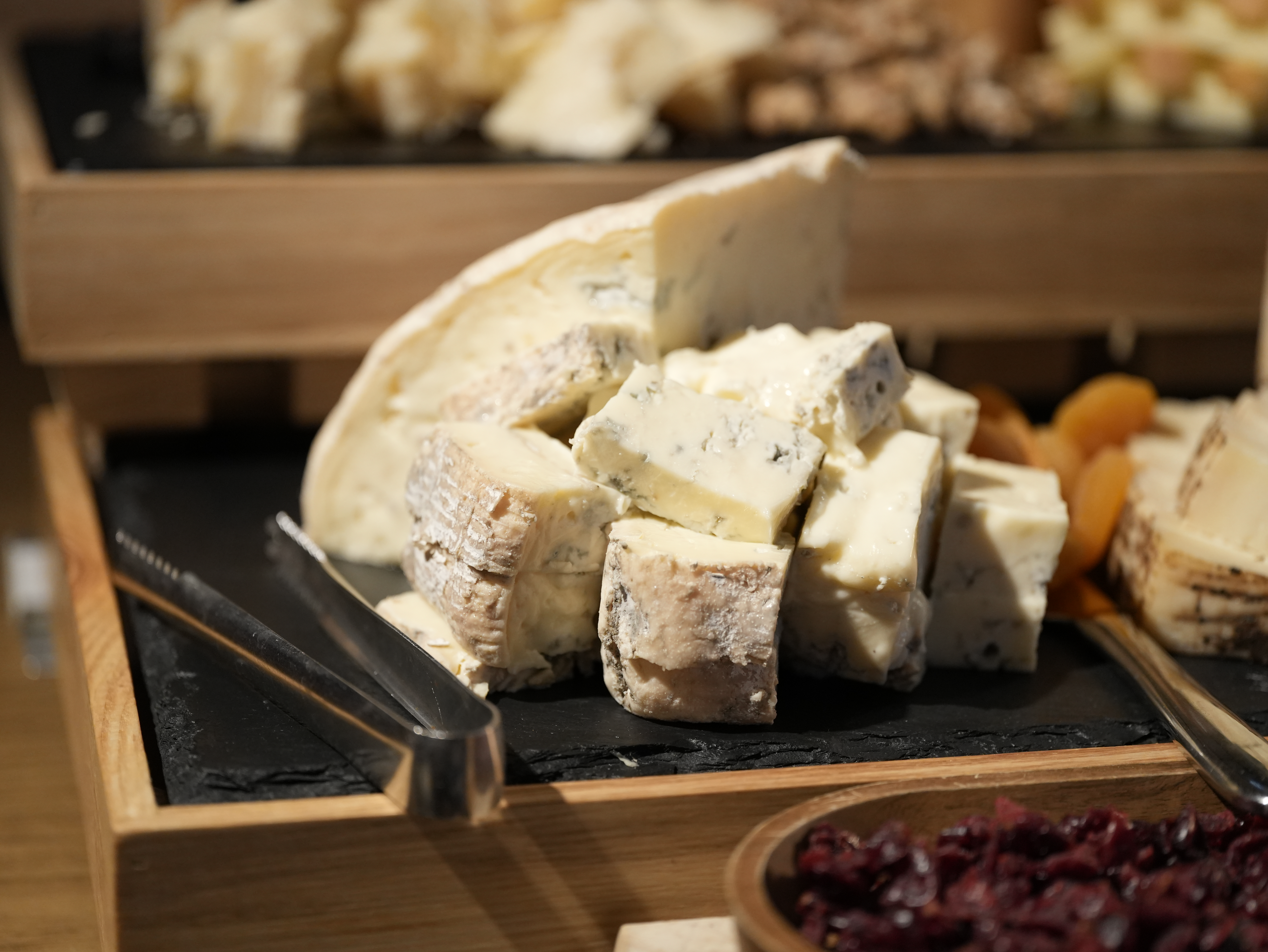
Gorgonzola

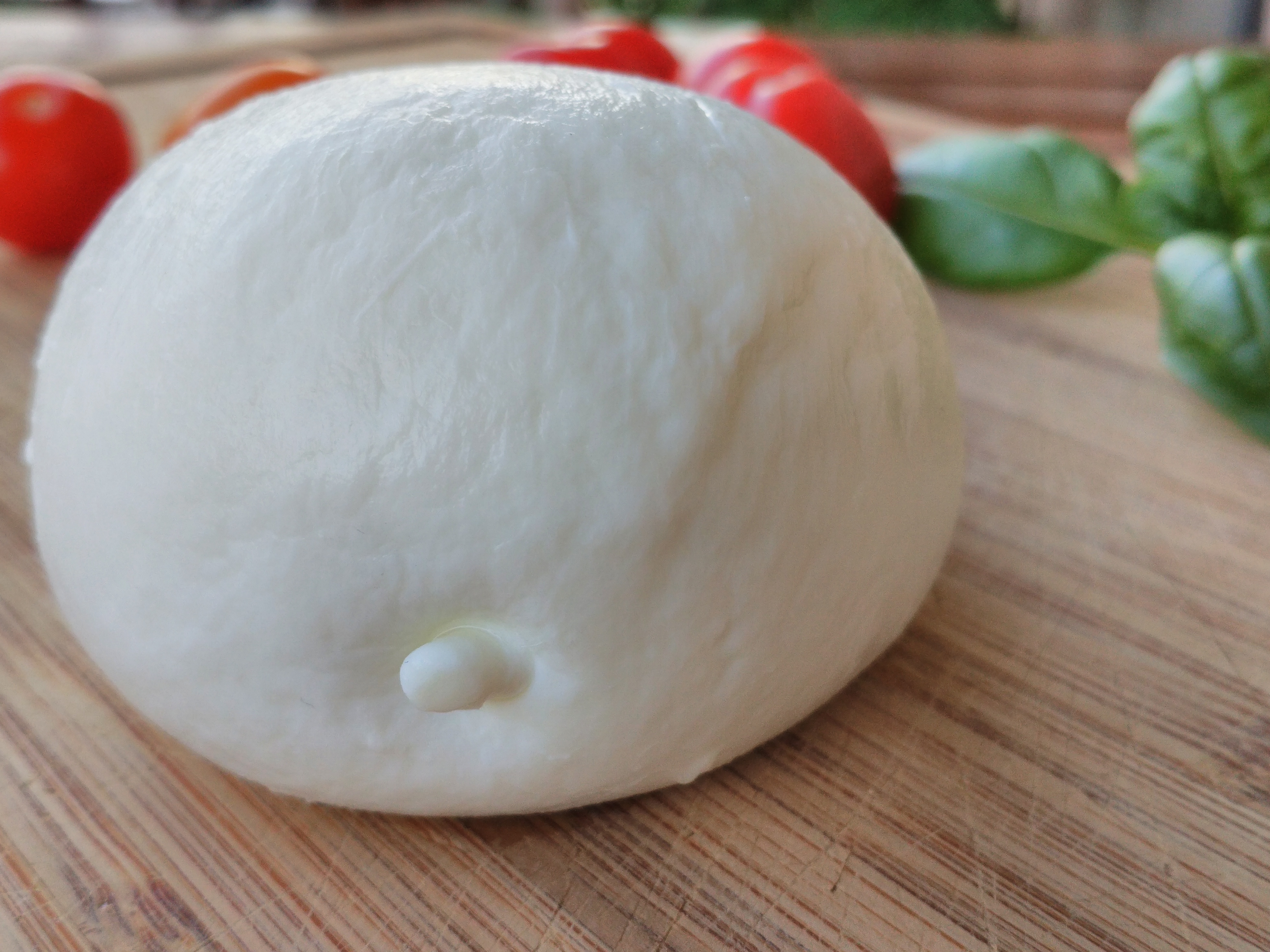
Mozzarella

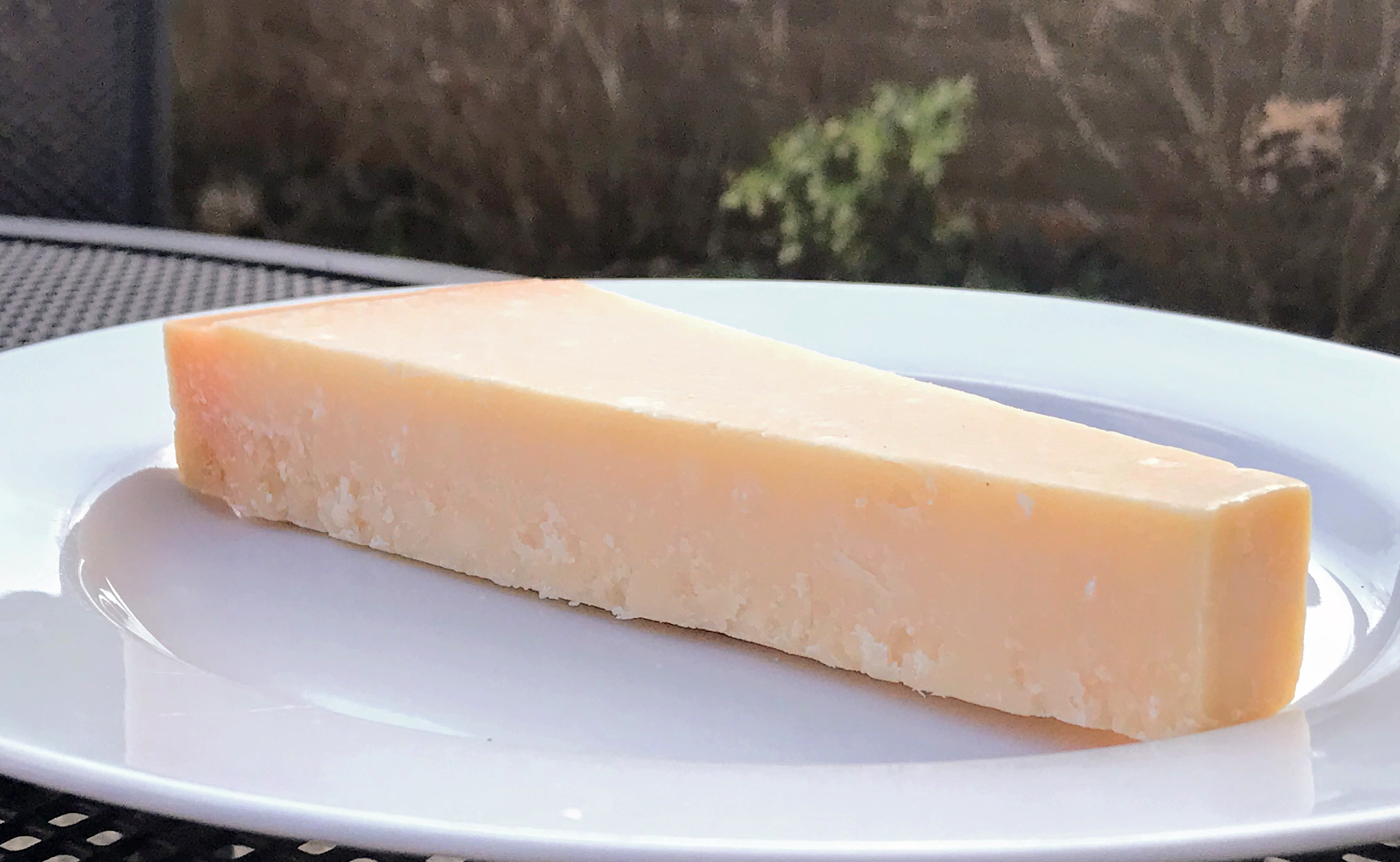
Parmigiano Reggiano

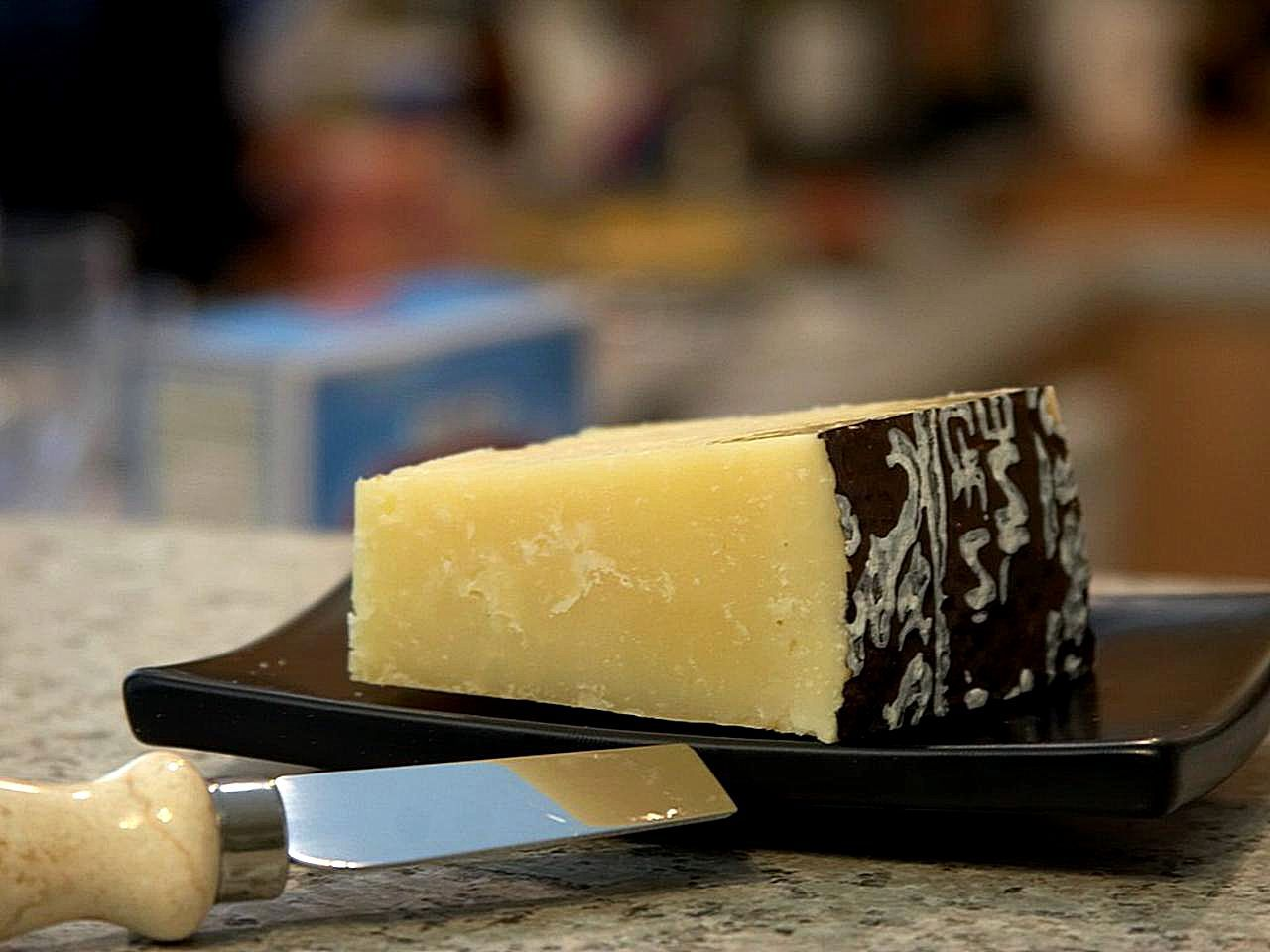
Pecorino romano

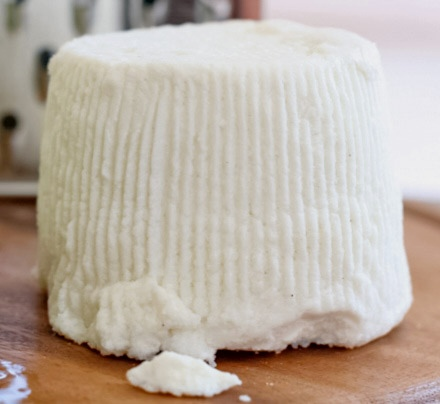
Ricotta

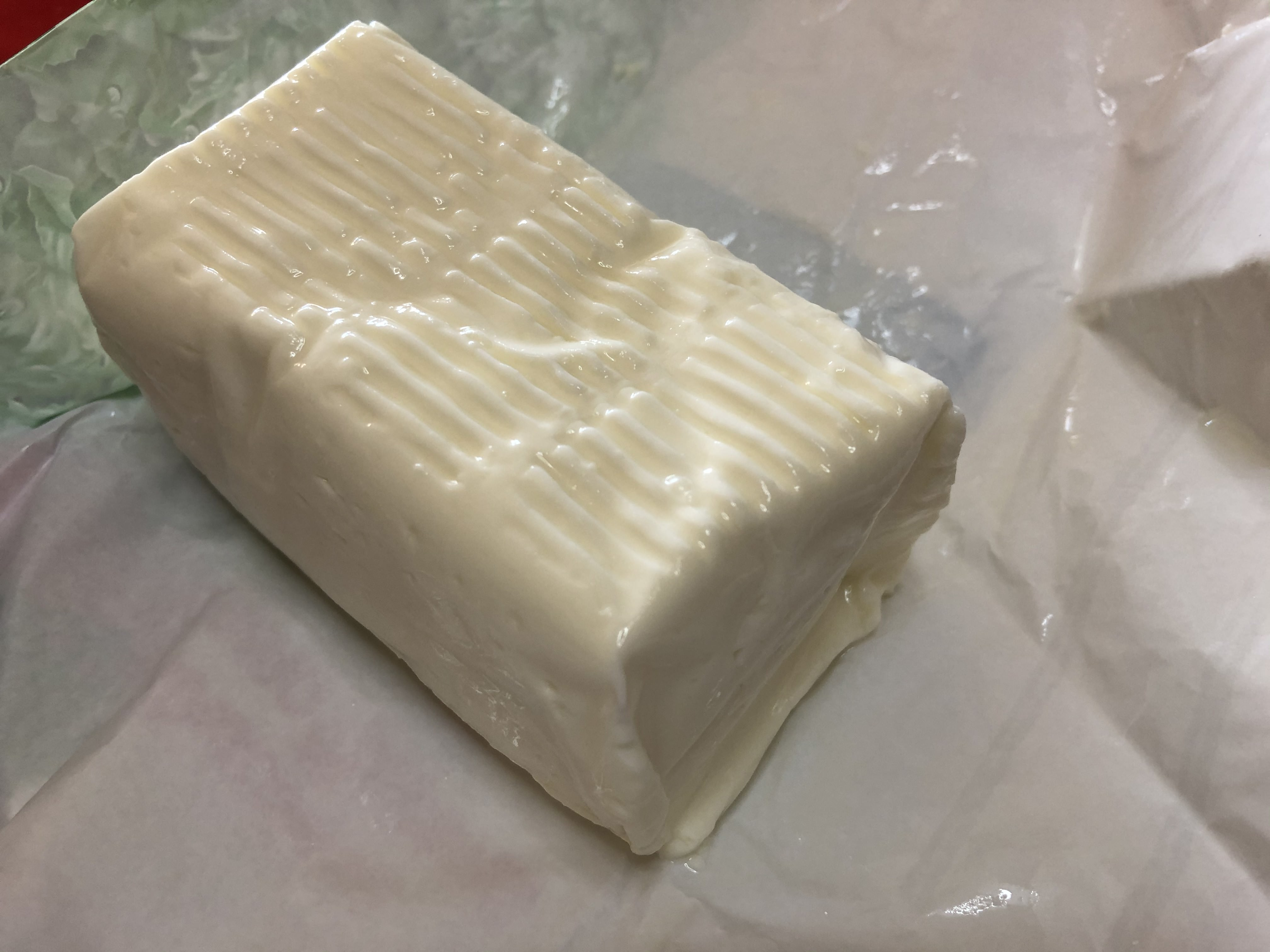
Stracchino

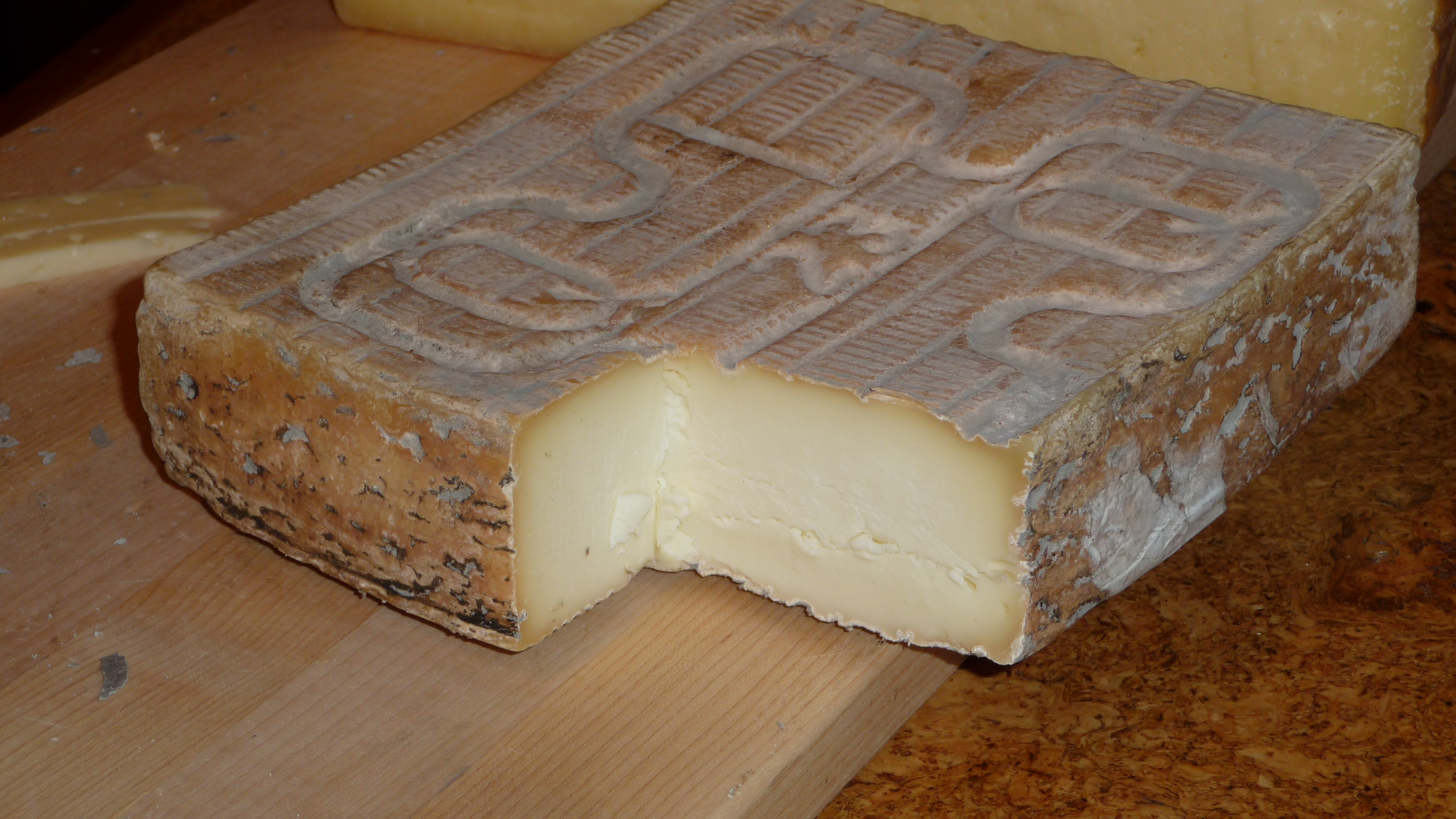
Taleggio

- Acceglio
- Alpkäse
- Ambra di Talamello
- Asiago
- Bastardo del Grappa
- Bel Paese
- Bocconcini
- Bra
- Burrata
- Caciocavallo
- Cacio figurato
- Cacioricotta
- Caciotta
- Calcagno
- Canestrato
- Caprino
- Casciotta d'Urbino
- Casizolu
- Caso peruto
- Castelmagno
- Castelrosso
- Casu martzu
- Crescenza
- Crucolo
- Crutin
- Dolcelatte
- Fior di latte (or fiordilatte)
- Fontina
- Formai de Mut dell'Alta Valle Brembana
- Galbanino
- Gorgonzola
- Grana Padano
- Mascarpone
- Montasio
- Monte Re
- Monte Veronese
- Morlacco del Grappa
- Mozzarella, mozzarella di bufala
- Murazzano
- Padraccio
- Parmigiano Reggiano (Parmesan)
- Pecorino
- Pecorino di Carmasciano
- Pecorino di Filiano
- Pecorino romano
- Pecorino sardo
- Pecorino siciliano
- Pecorino toscano
- Piave
- Provatura
- Provola, provola silana
- Provolone
- Puzzone di Moena
- Quartirolo lombardo
- Ragusano
- Raschera
- Reblec
- Ricotta
- Ricotta di fuscella
- Ricotta forte
- Ricotta salata
- Robiola
- Rosa Camuna
- Salva
- Scamorza
- Silter
- Squacquerone
- Stracchino
- Stracciatella di bufala
- Taleggio
- Toma
- Valtellina Casera

==== Cheese dishes ====
- Mozzarella in carrozza
- Mozzarelline allo zafferano

=== Desserts and pastries ===
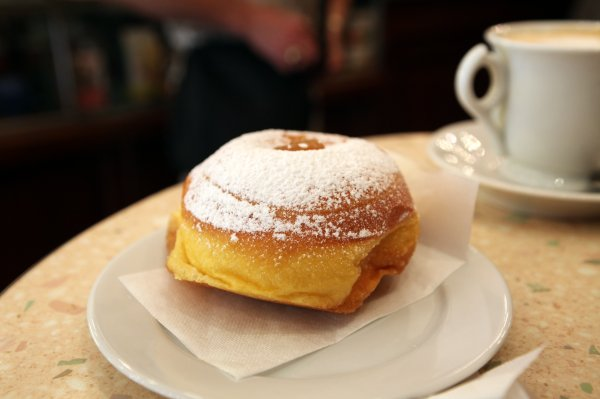
Bombolone

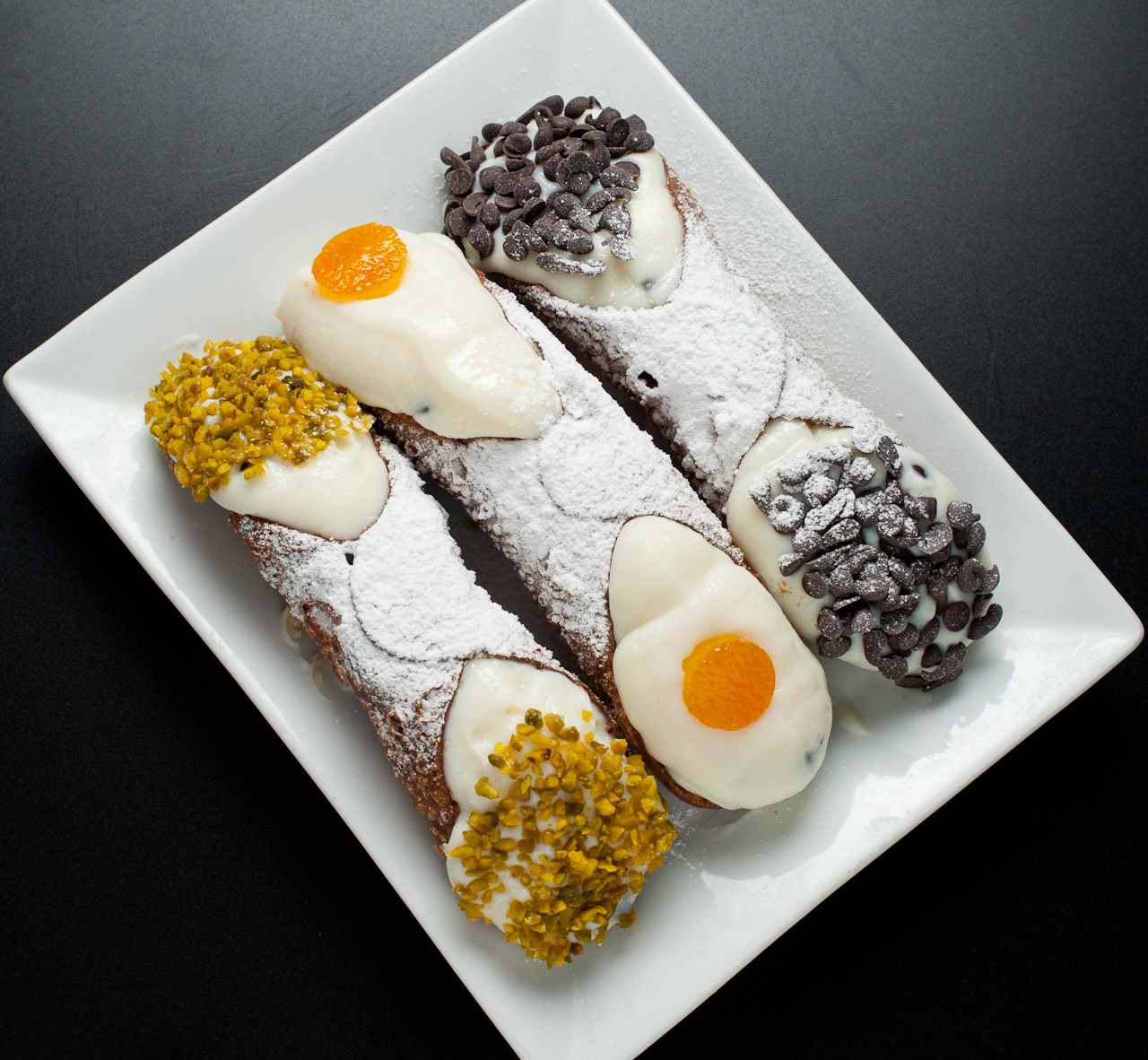
Cannoli siciliani

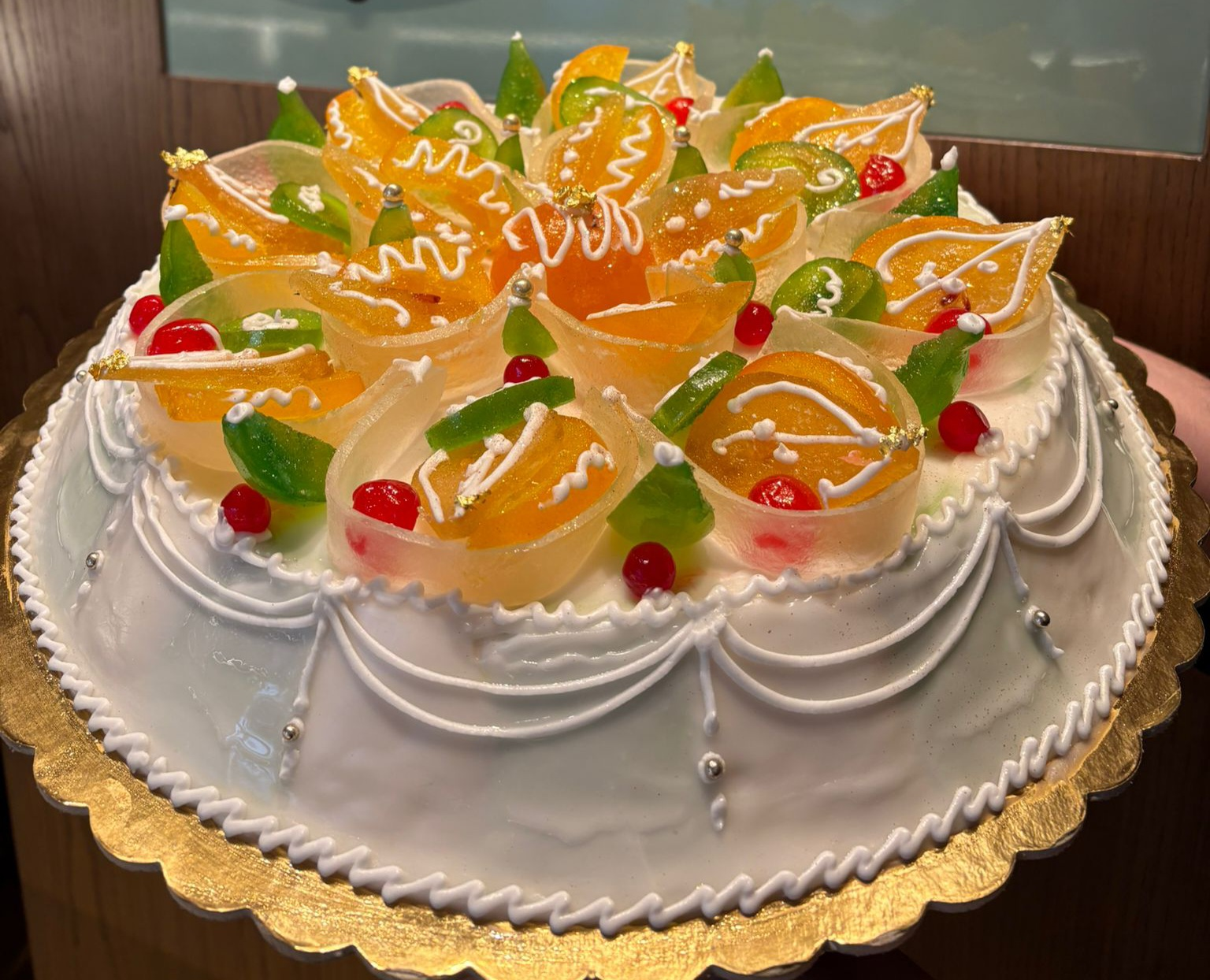
Cassata siciliana

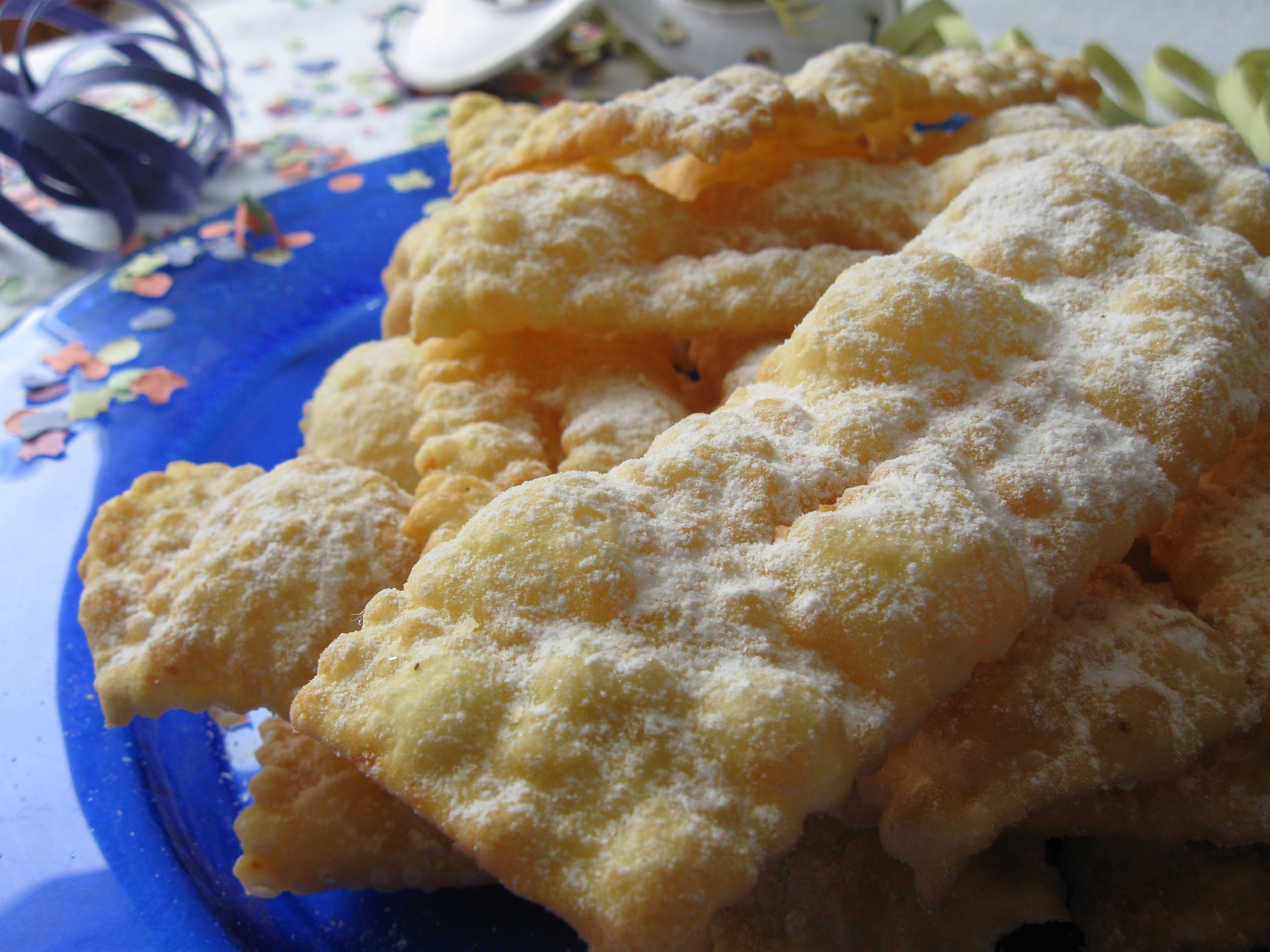
Chiacchiere

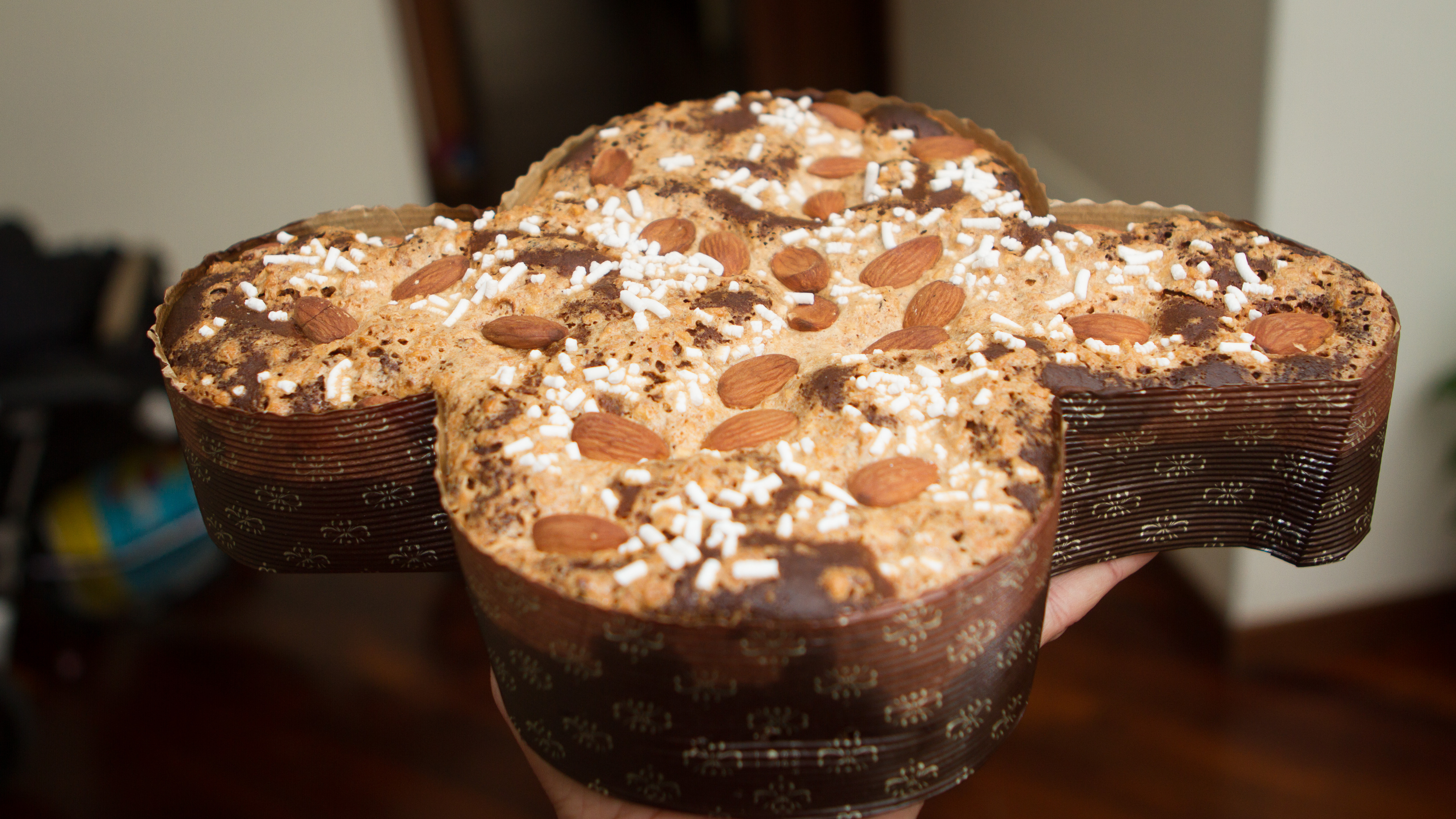
Colomba pasquale

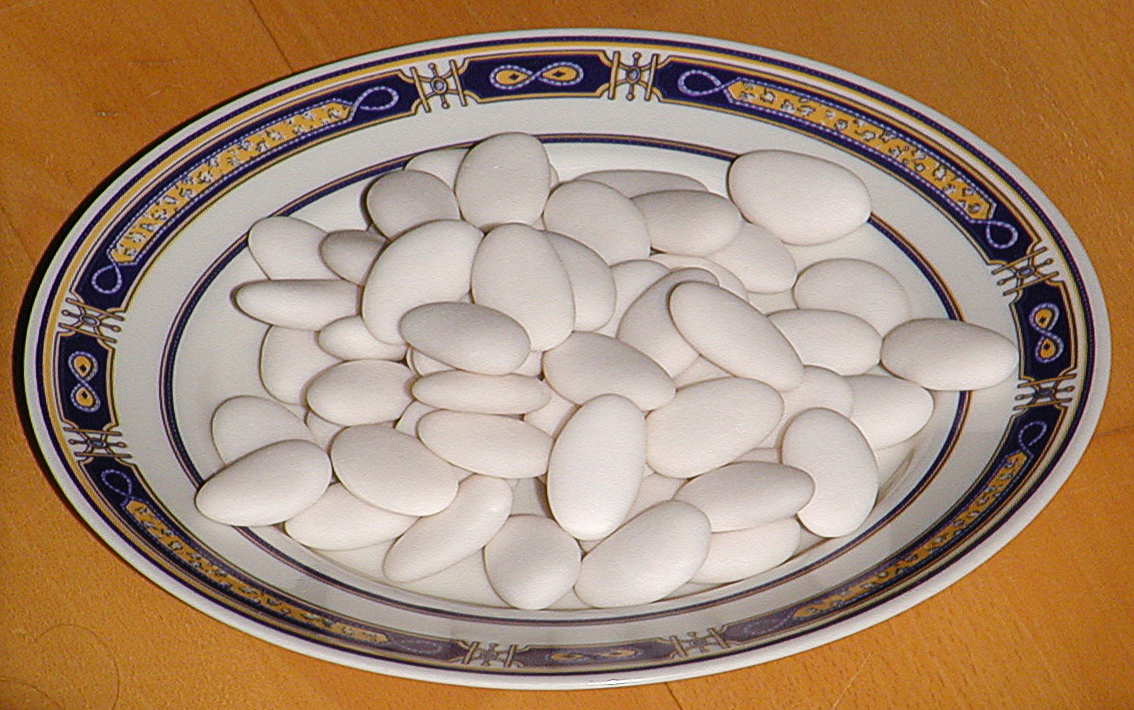
Confetti di Sulmona

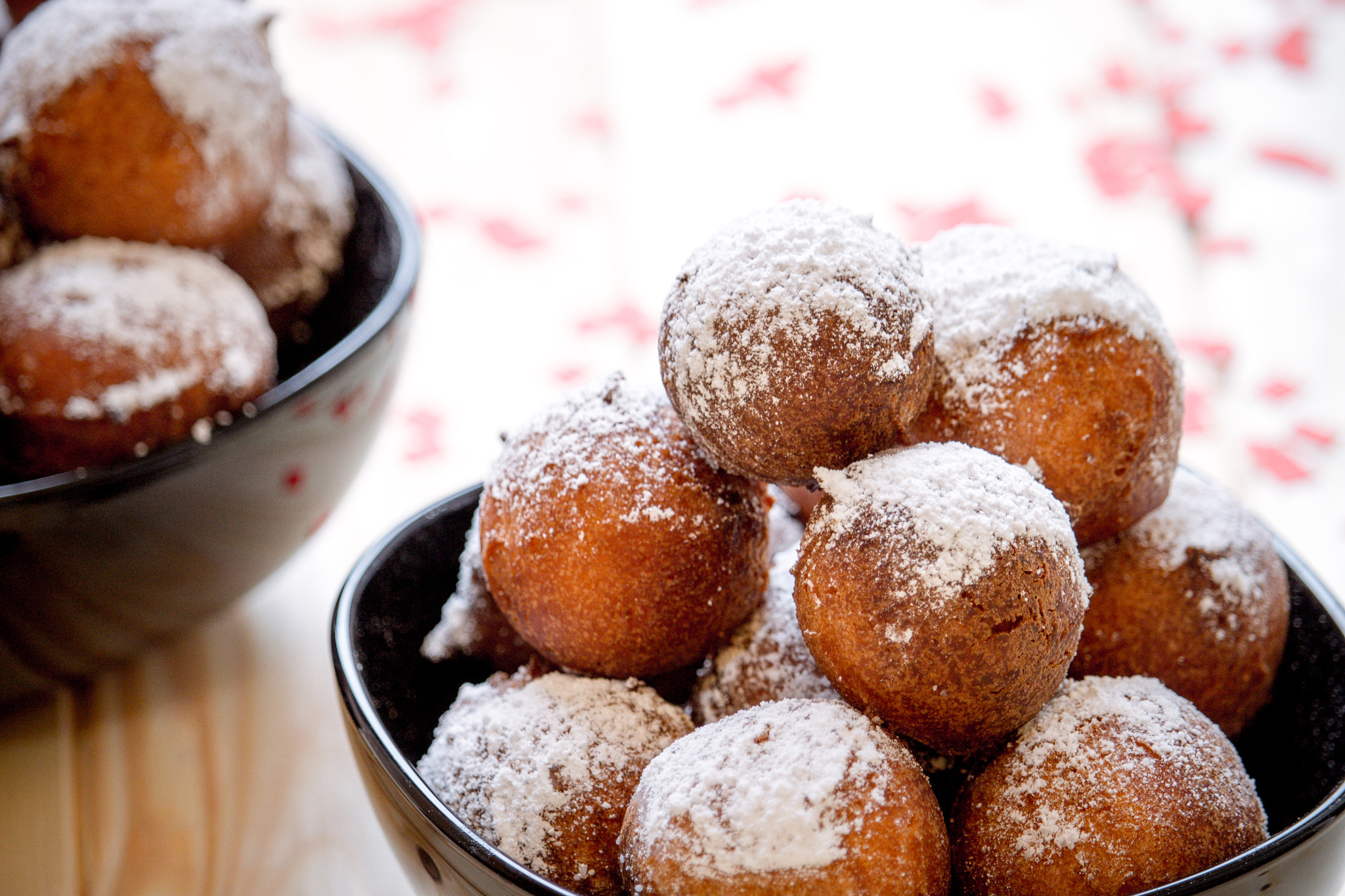
Frittelle

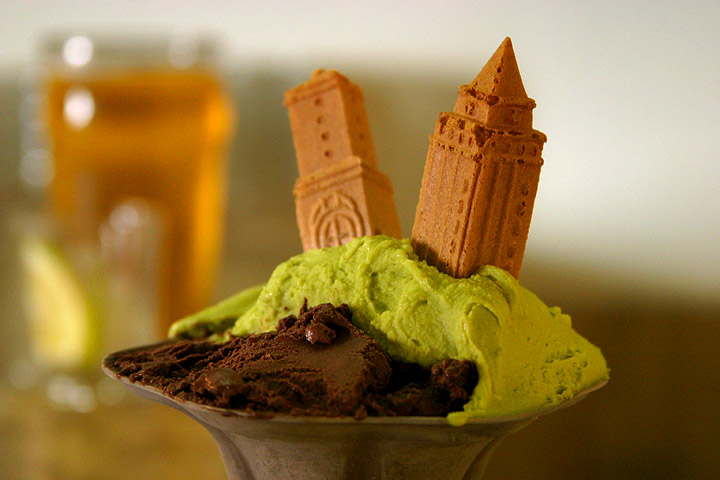
Gelato

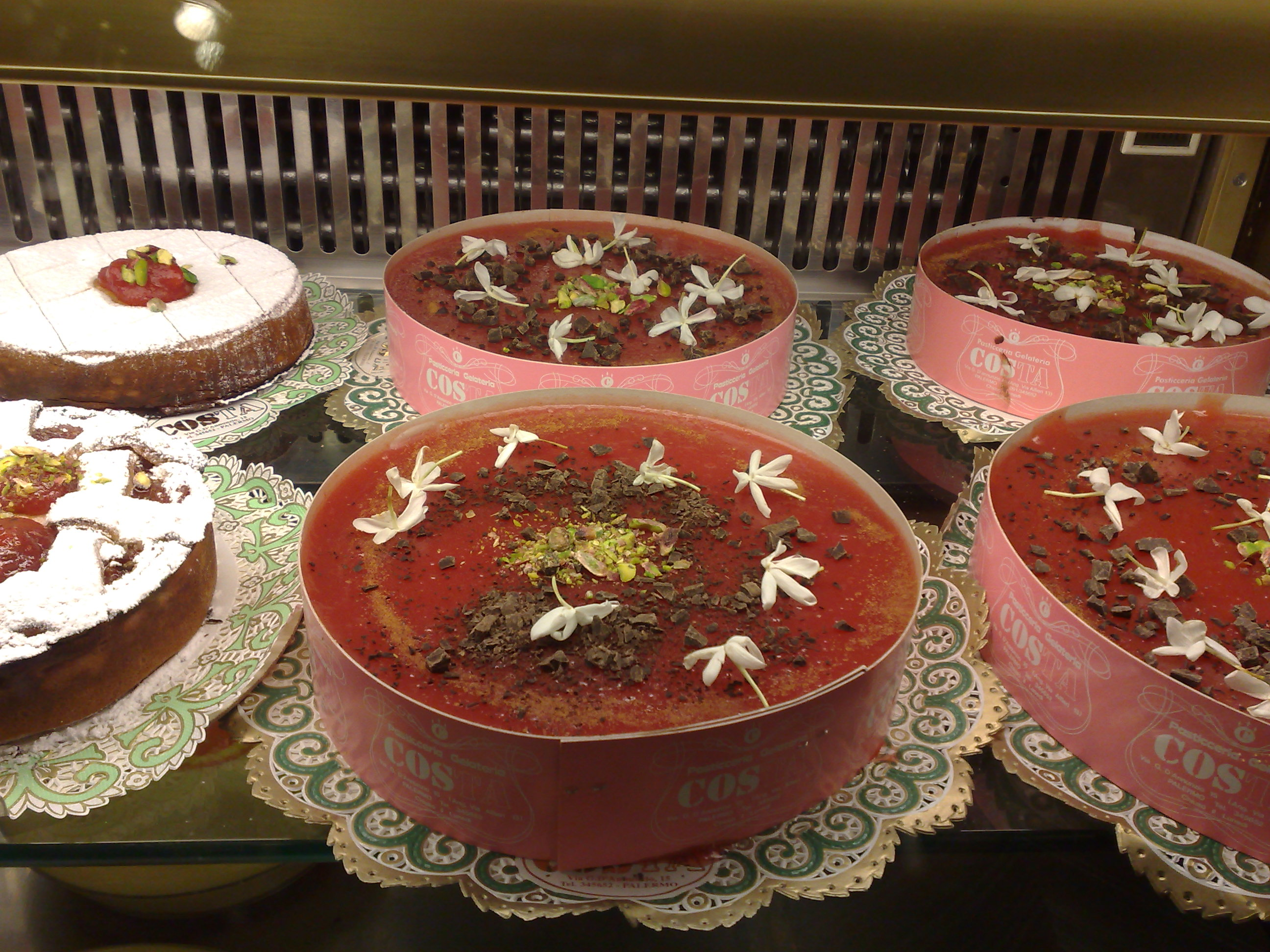
Gelo di melone

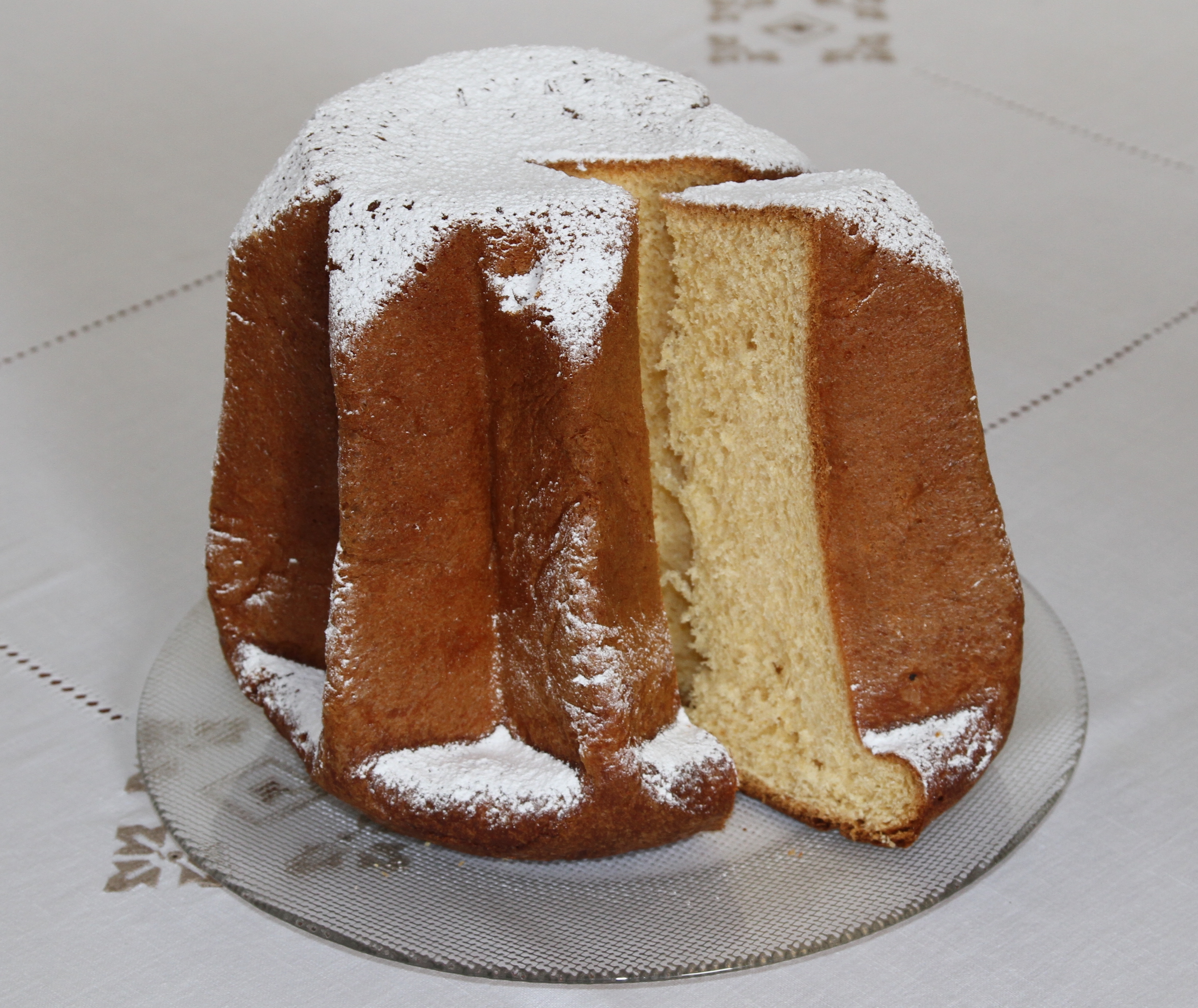
Pandoro

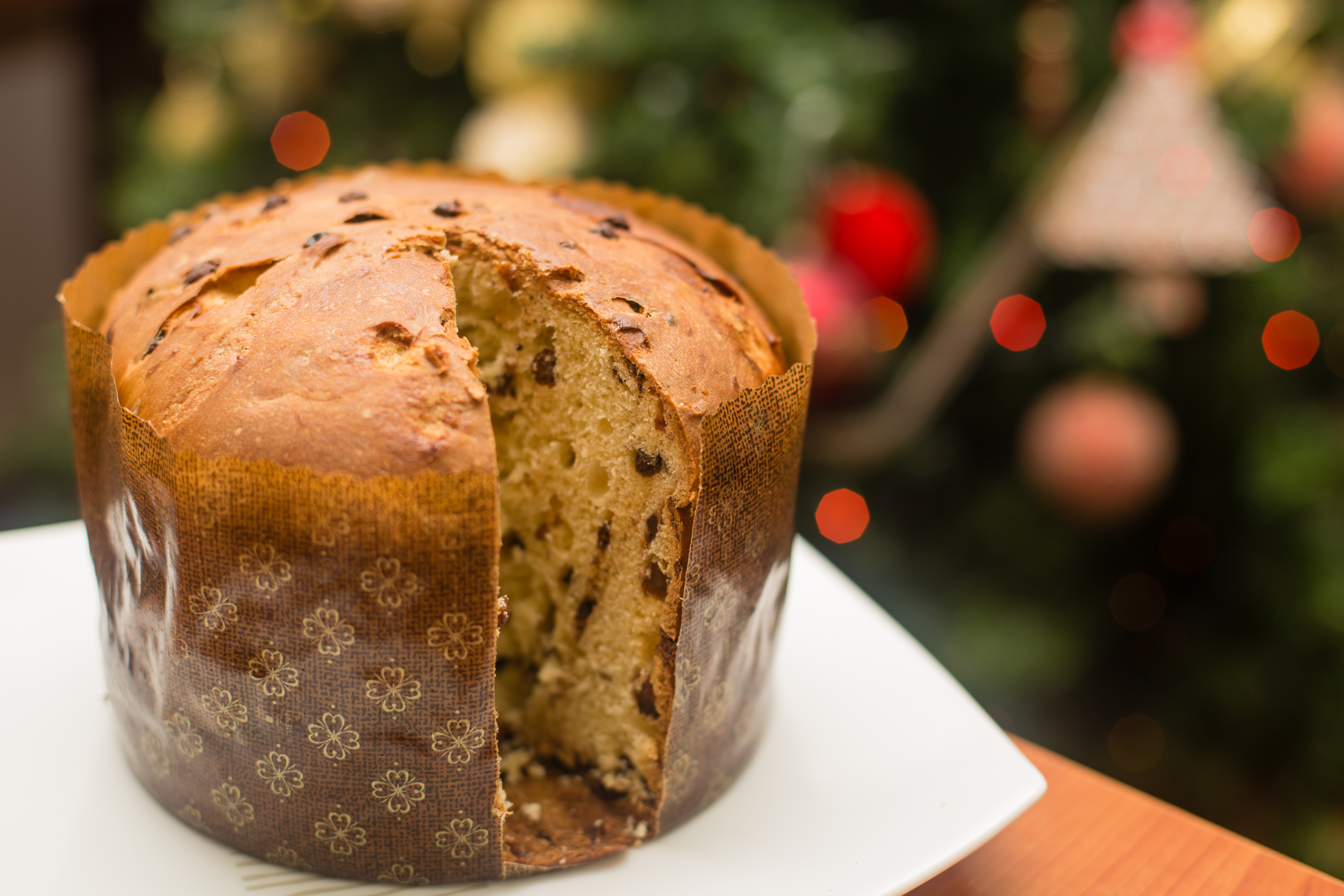
Panettone

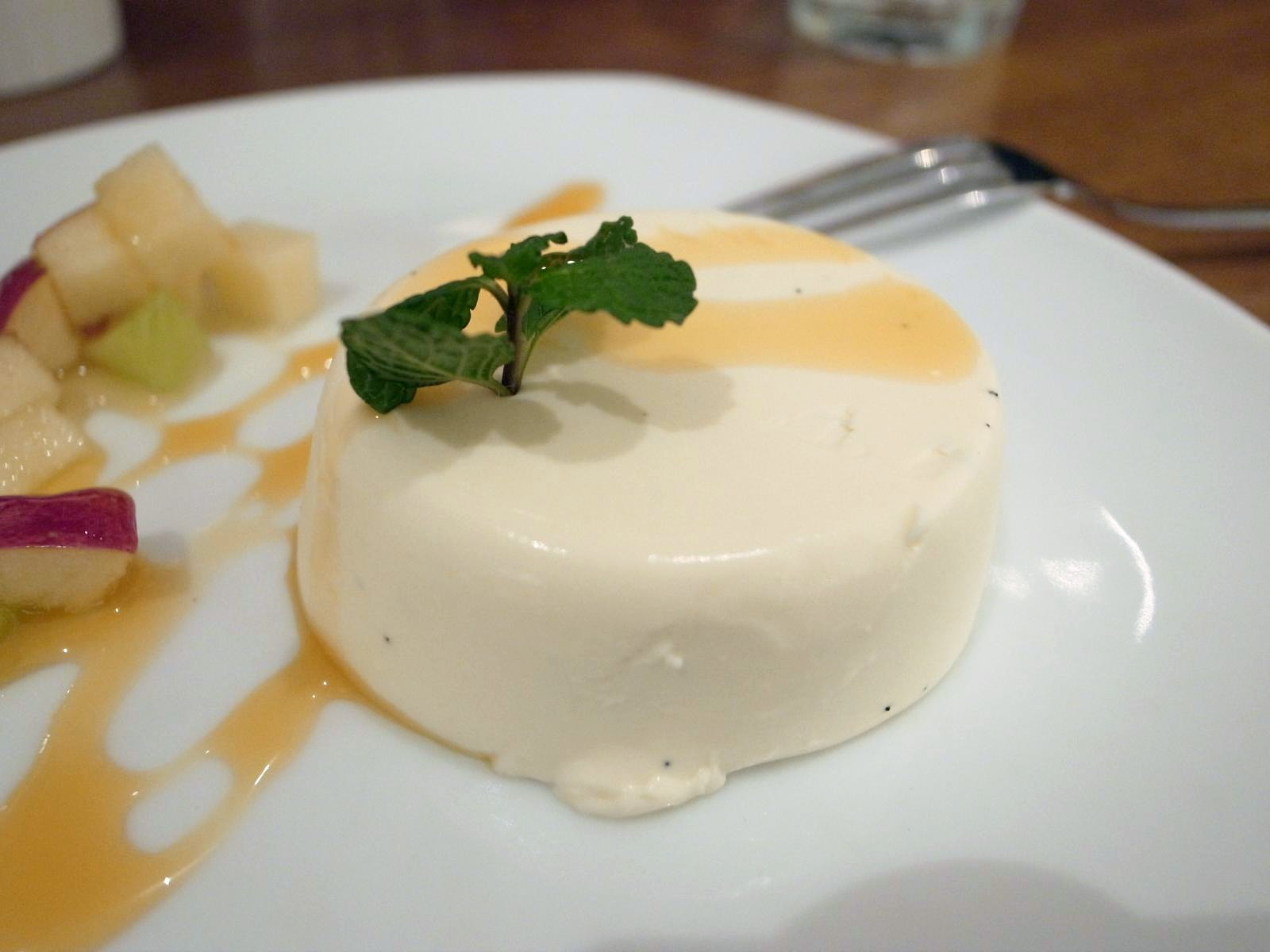
Panna cotta

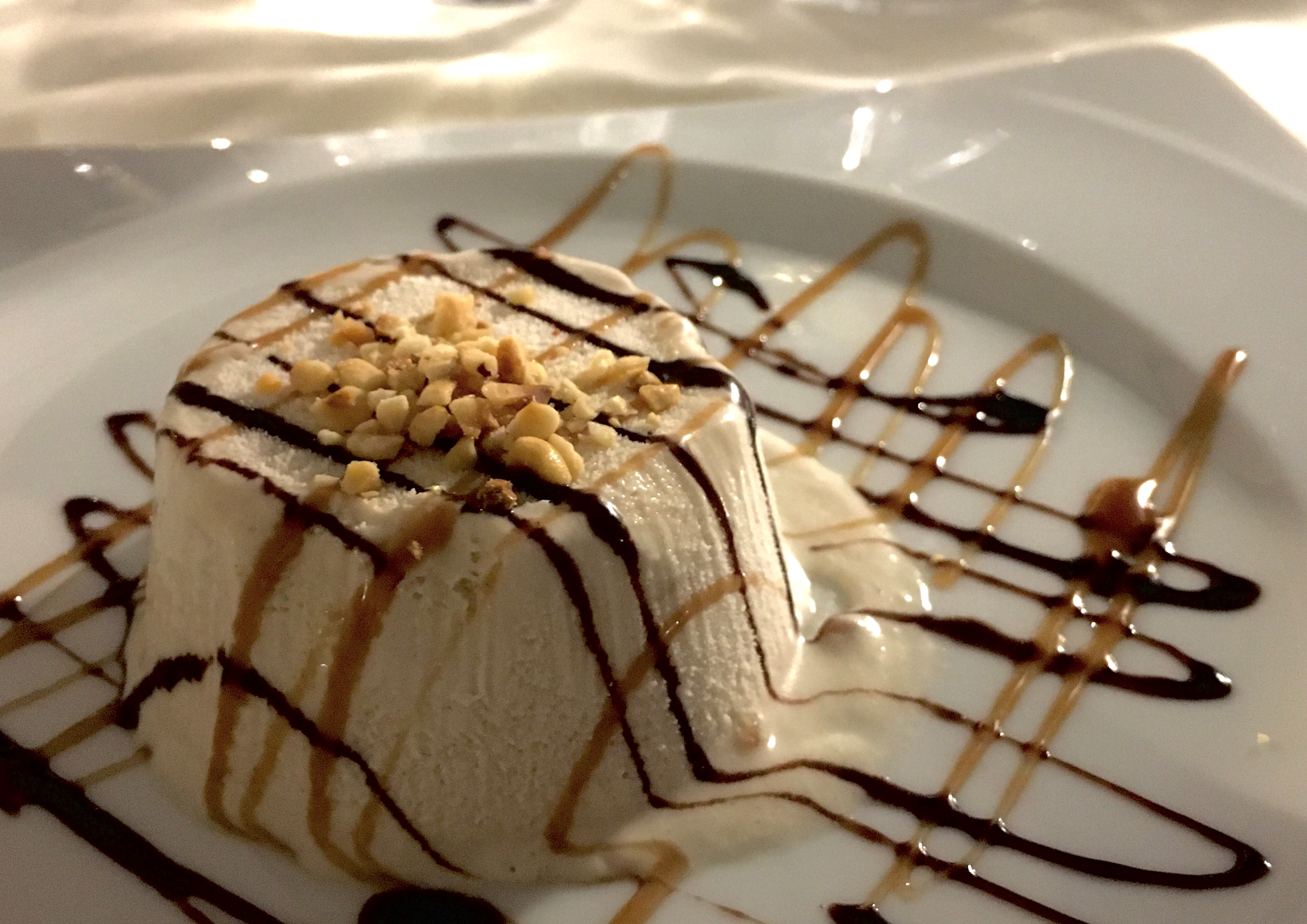
Semifreddo

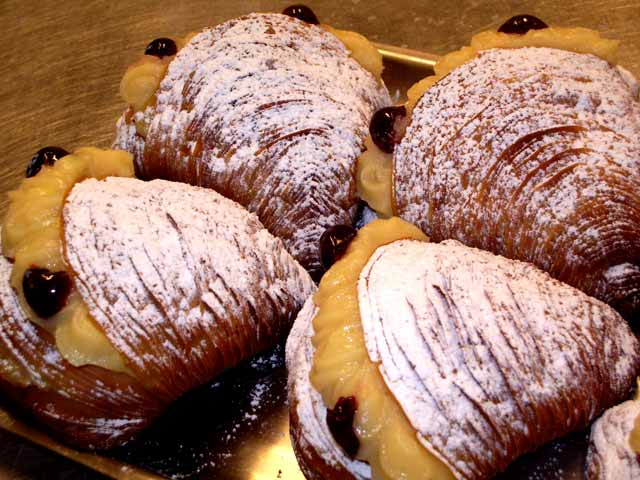
Sfogliatelle Santa Rosa

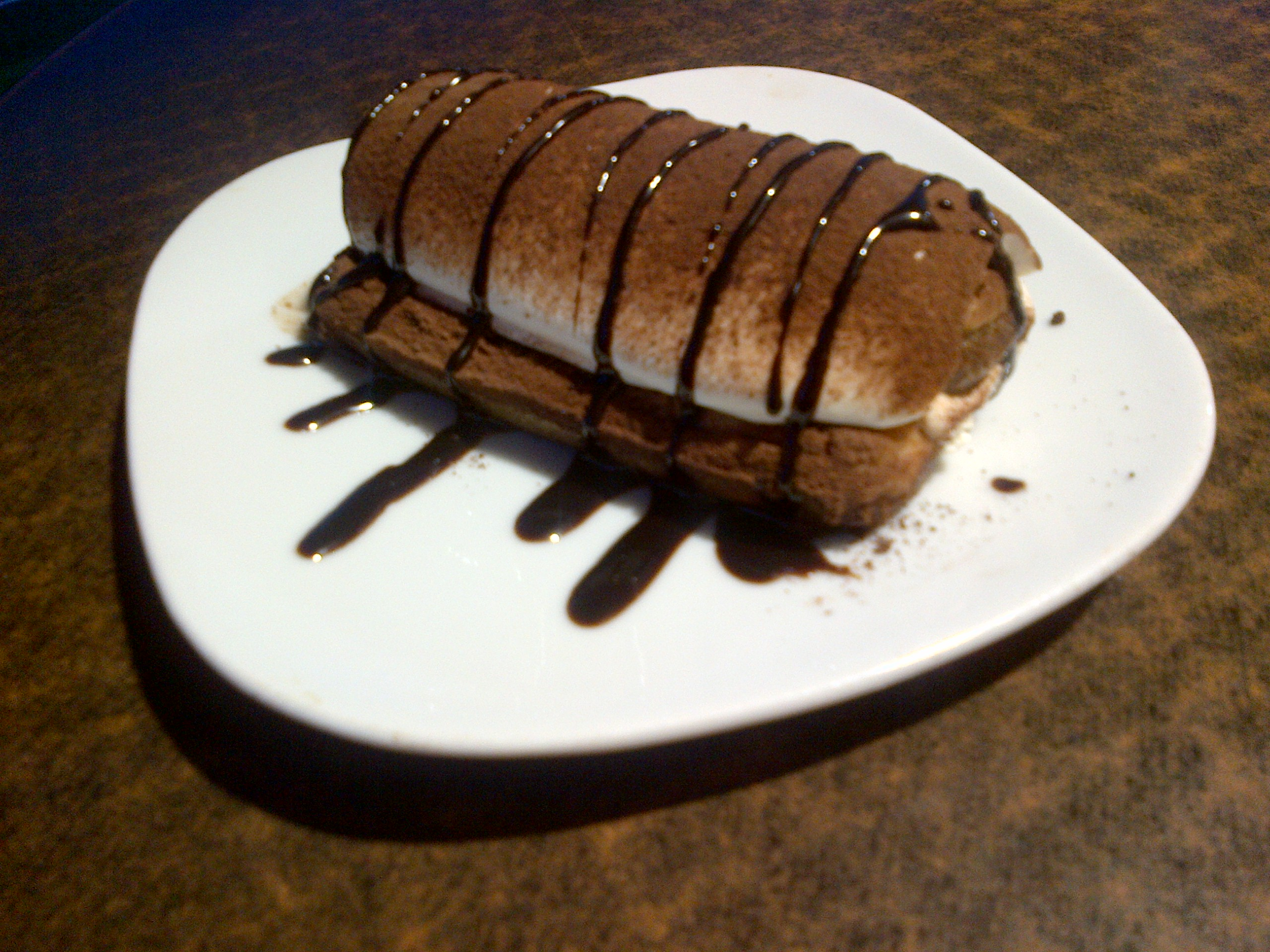
Tiramisu in Naples

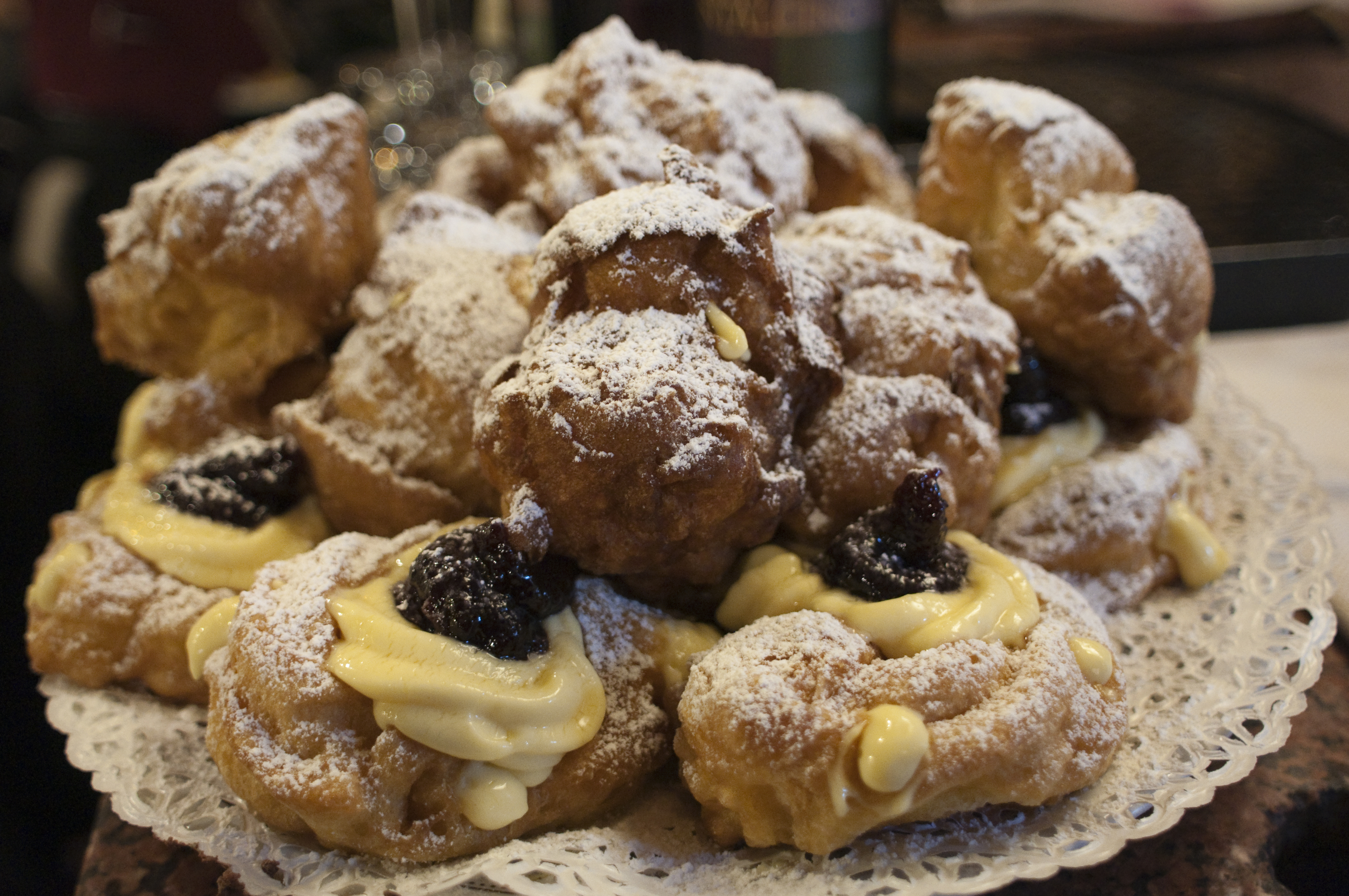
Zeppole

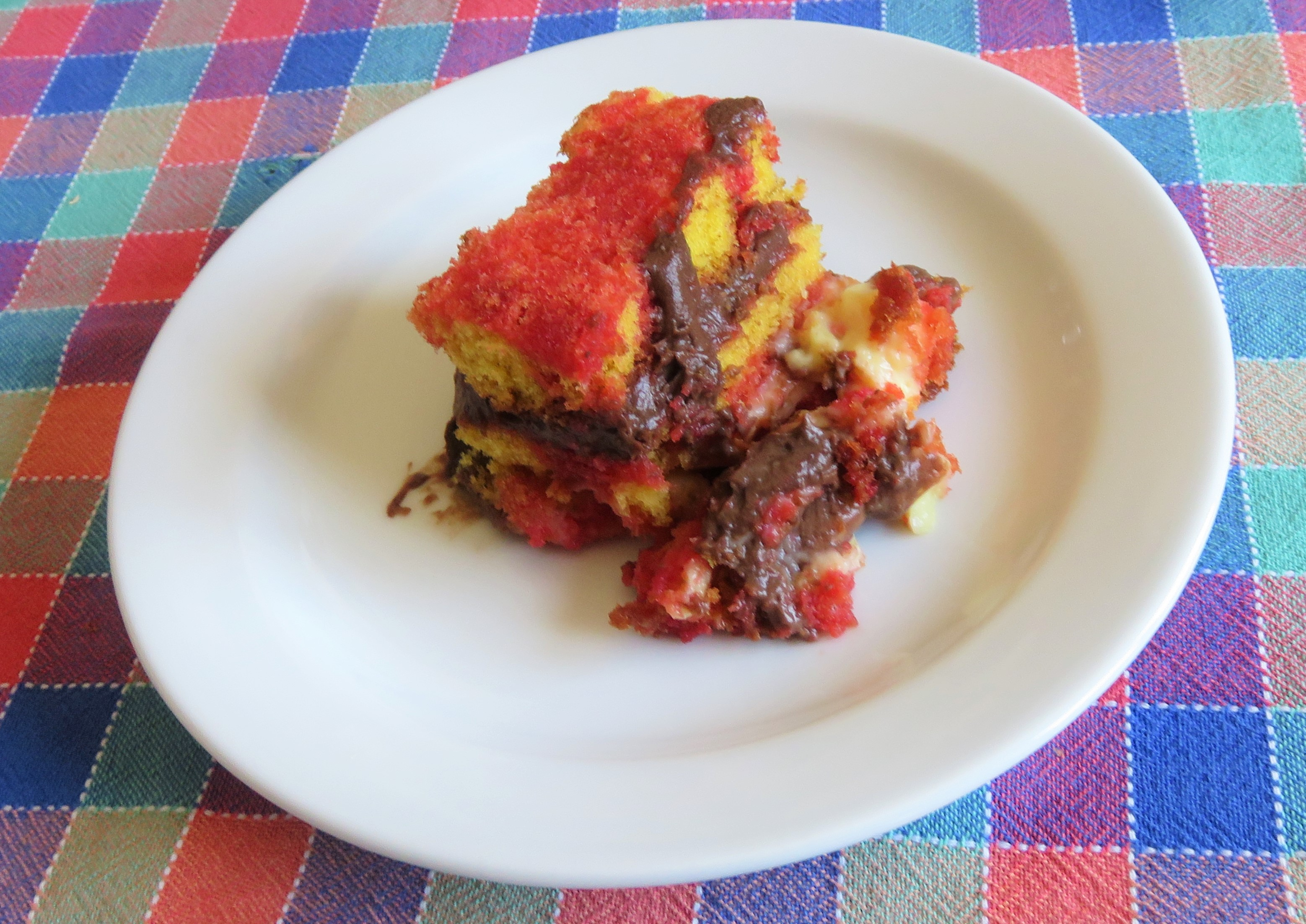
Zuppa inglese

- Abbamele
- Aceto dolce – fruit preserves made with vinegar, honey and grape juice
- Affogato (or affogato al caffè)
- Africanetti
- Africani
- Agnello pasquale
- Amaretto, amaretto di Saronno
- Amor polenta (or amorpolenta)
- Anello di Monaco, anello di san Luigi Gonzaga
- Arancini
- Aranzada
- Assabesi
- Barbajada
- Babà al rum
- Baci di Alassio, baci di dama, baci di Cherasco, baci di Cremona
- Baicoli
- Baxin
- Befanini
- Bensone
- Berlingozzo
- Bicciolano (biciolan in Piedmontese language)
- Bignolata mantovana
- Bisciola
- Biscione reggiano
- Biscotti (smaller biscotti: biscottini), (Note: In English, biscotti is commonly used to refer specifically to cantucci.) biscotti bolliti, biscotti catalani, biscotti del Lagaccio, biscotti di San Martino, biscotti regina, biscottini di Prosto, biscotto di Castellammare, biscotto di Ceglie (or biscotto cegliese), biscotto di mezz'agosto, biscotto fiorentino, biscotto salute (or biscotto della salute), cantucci (also known as biscotti di Prato or biscotti etruschi; smaller cantucci: cantuccini)
- Bocconotto
- Bombolone
- Bonèt
- Bossolà bresciano
- Budino
- Budino di riso (or risottino)
- Bussilan
- Bussolano
- Bracciatello, bracciatello cesenate
- Brasadelo
- Brigidino di Lamporecchio
- Brioche con gelato
- Brioscia
- Brutti ma buoni
- Buccellato, Buccellato di Lucca
- Bustrengo
- Caffè in forchetta
- Calcioni marchigiani
- Caldi dolci
- Calgionetti
- Caldo freddo
- Calzone di San Leonardo
- Camporelli
- Canestrelli, canestrelli novesi
- Cannarìcoli (or cannarìculi)
- Cannolo siciliano
- Caragnoli
- Carfogn
- Cariton
- Carsenta (or cascenta)
- Carsenza
- Cartellate
- Cartocciata
- Cartoccio di ricotta (or macallè)
- Cassata siciliana, cassatina siciliana
- Cassatella, cassatella di Agira, cassatella di sant'Agata
- Castagnaccio
- Castagne del prete
- Castagnole (or favette)
- Caterine
- Cavallucci
- Caviadini
- Celli ripieni
- Certosino di Bologna
- Charlotte alla milanese
- Chiacchiere
- Chiaro di luna
- Chifferi
- Chisulì
- Cialda di Montecatini
- Ciambella, ciambella di San Cataldo, ciambella romagnola (or brazadèla), ciambella sorana
- Ciambellette al vino
- Ciambellino
- Ciambellone
- Ciaramicola
- Ciarduna
- Cioccolato di Modica
- Cicerata
- Cicerchiata
- Confetti, confetti di Sulmona, confetti ricci
- Coppa sabauda (or coppa di seirass)
- Coppetta
- Cornetto
- Cotognata
- Coviglia
- Crema al mascarpone, crema bruciata, crema carsolina, crema di marroni, crema diplomatica, crema reggina
- Cremino
- Crespella
- Cri cri
- Croccante
- Crocetta di Caltanissetta
- Crostata, crostata alla marmellata, crostata alla marmellata di albicocche, crostata alla Nutella, crostata di frutta, crostata di ricotta
- Crustuli
- Csenta
- Cubeletto (or gobeletto)
- Cuccìa
- Cuccidati
- Cuddrireddra
- Cuddura
- Cudduraci
- Cullurelli
- Cuore d'Abruzzo
- Cupeta
- Cutizza
- Cuzzupa
- Delizia al limone
- Dolceriso del Moro
- Dolce Torino
- Faldacchea
- Fiapòn
- Fichi impaccati
- Finocchini
- Focaccia di Susa
- Frittella, frittelle di San Giuseppe
- Frustingo
- Frutta martorana
- Gelato (spumone, stracciatella, tartufo di Pizzo, etc.)
- Gelo di melone
- Genovese
- Gianduiotto and gianduja
- Giurgiulena
- Gòfri
- Graffe napoletane
- Granita
- Grano cotto
- Grattachecca
- Guastedda dolce nissena
- Gubana
- Krumiri (or crumiri)
- Lacabòn (or lecabòn)
- Lattacciolo
- Latte brulè
- Latte di mandorla
- Latte dolce fritto
- Latteruolo
- Lonzino di fico
- Lorica
- Lose golose
- Lu serpe
- Maccheroni con le noci
- Mandorla riccia di Francavilla Fontana
- Mandorlato, mandorlato al cioccolato di Modigliana
- Margheritine di Stresa
- Maritozzo
- Marron glacé
- Melanzane al cioccolato
- Miacetto
- Miascia
- Migliaccio, migliaccio campano, migliaccio pistoiese, migliaccio romagnolo
- Ministeriale
- Minna di virgini
- Mistocchina
- Mostaccino
- 'Mpanatigghi
- Muccellato
- Mustacciuoli
- Mustazzoli
- Nacatole
- Nadalin
- Nevola
- Nocciolini di Canzo, nocciolini di Chivasso
- Nucàtuli
- 'Nzuddha
- 'Nzuddi
- Offella, offella di Parona
- Pagnotta di San Martino, pagnotta pasquale
- Pan dei morti
- Pan della Marchesa
- Pane dell'Assedio
- Pan dell'orso
- Pandolce (or pandolce genovese)
- Pandoro
- Panera
- Panettone
- Panforte
- Pangiallo (or pancialle)
- Pan meino
- Pan minisc'
- Panna cotta
- Panone
- Panpepato
- Papasìn
- Papassinu
- Parrozzo
- Pasta cresciuta
- Pasta di mandorle
- Paste di meliga
- Pasticciotto
- Pastiera napoletana
- Patacia
- Pepatelli
- Pesche ripiene
- Petrali
- Pevarini
- Pignolata, pignolata al miele
- Pinolate
- Pinsa romana
- Pinza, pinza bolognese, pinza triestina
- Piparella
- Pitta di San Martino, pitta 'mpigliata
- Pitteddhre
- Pizza dolce abruzzese, pizza dolce di Beridde
- Pizzella
- Polenta d'Ivrea
- Polenta del Marengo
- Polenta e osei
- Poperati
- Presnitz
- Puoti (or frolle di Santa Lucia)
- Pupazza frascatana
- Purceddhruzzi
- Purcidd'
- Putizza (or potizza)
- Raffiolini (or raffiolino)
- Raviola di ricotta nissena
- Ravioli dolci
- Ricciarelli
- Roccocò
- Rollò
- Rosacatarre
- Rustico
- Sacripantina
- Salame al cioccolato
- Salatini
- Salòt
- Sanguinaccio dolce
- Sannacchiudere
- Sasanello gravinese
- Savoiardi
- Scarcella
- Scarpedd
- Scroccafusi
- Seada
- Semifreddo
- Semolino dolce
- Serpentone
- Sfincia di San Giuseppe
- Sfogliatella, sfogliatella Santa Rosa
- Sgaiozzi
- Sguta
- Sorbetto, sorbetto al limone, sorbetto alla pesca
- Sospiro
- Spina santa
- Spongada
- Spongarda
- Spongata
- Spume di mandorla
- Squiccia
- Stomatico
- Stroscia
- Strucchi
- Strudel, strudel di mele
- Struffoli
- Sugolo
- Susamielli
- Tapít
- Tegola dolce
- Testa di moro
- Tette delle monache
- Timballo di Martin Sec (or timballo di pere martine)
- Tiramisu
- Torcetti
- Torrone, torrone di Caltanissetta, torrone di Guardiagrele, torrone gelato, torrone Nurzia
- Torta Barozzi, torta Bertolina, torta caprese, torta del buonumore, torta del Donizetti, torta della nonna, torta delle monache, torta delle rose, torta di fioretto, torta di mandorle, torta di nocciole, torta diplomatica, torta di riso (or torta degli addobbi), torta di riso e cacao, torta di San Biagio, torta di tagliatelle, torta di tagliatelline, torta Elvezia, torta gianduia (or torta gianduja), torta greca, torta mantovana, torta mimosa, torta monferrina, torta Ostiglia, torta paesana, torta paradiso (or less commonly torta del paradiso), torta sbrisolona, torta secca di Carpenedolo, torta setteveli, torta tenerina, torta tenerina al limone, torta 900, torta Zurigo
- Tortelli fritti alla crema
- Tortellino dolce di Marianna
- Tortionata
- Tortone
- Treccia d'oro
- Tricotto
- Turtèl sguasaròt
- Veneziana
- Zabaione
- Zaeti (or zaleti)
- Zelten
- Zeppola, zeppole di San Giuseppe (or crispelle di riso)
- Zirotto
- Zuccherini bolognesi, zuccherini montanari
- Zuccotto
- Zuppa inglese

=== Other foods and drinks ===
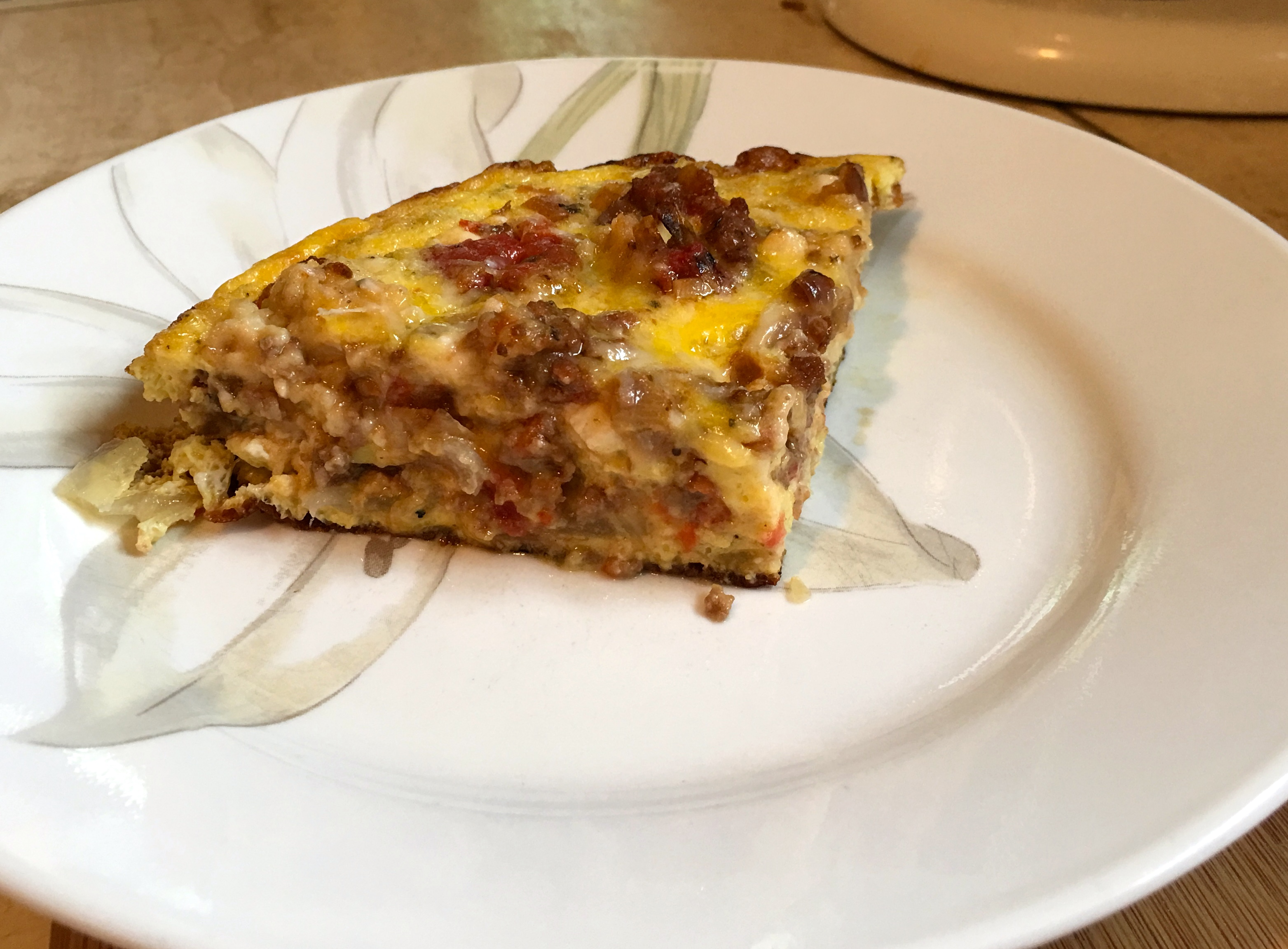
Frittata

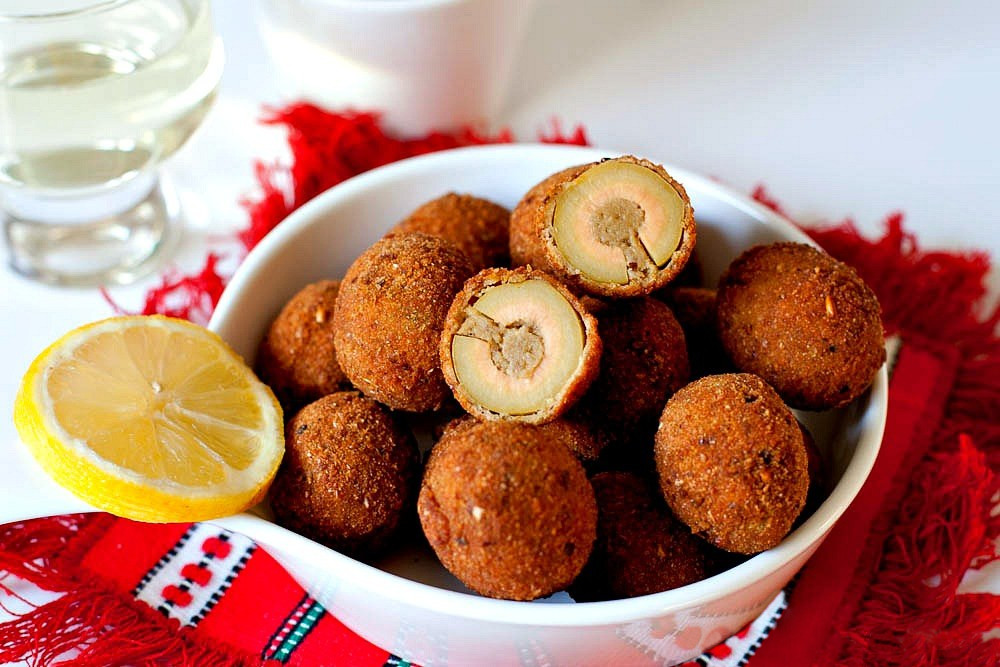
Olive all'ascolana

- Bagna càuda
- Capunsei
- Chifeletti
- Chisciöi (or panel)
- Ciaudedda
- Ciccioli
- Cocule salentine
- Condiglione
- Crostini al salmone affumicato, crostini neri toscani (or crostini neri and crostini toscani)
- Fagioli con le cotiche
- Fagottini di pasta sfoglia
- Farinata di ceci (or farinata), farinata bianca (or farinata di grano), farinata di zucca
- Focaccia ripiena
- Frascarelli
- Frico, frico con le patate
- Frittata, frittata ai fiori di zucca, frittata di asparagi, frittata di cipolle, frittata di pasta (or frittata di maccheroni), frittata di riso, frittata di scammaro, frittata di spinaci, frittata di zucchine
- Frittelle di cavolfiore
- Gattò di patate (or gatò)
- Involtini di verza
- Manafregoli
- Manfrigoli (or manfrigole)
- Mpurnatu
- Olive all'ascolana
- Pallotte cacio e ova
- Panada
- Panella
- Panissa
- Panuozzo
- Pasticcio del monsù
- Patata americana
- Pere martine al Barolo
- Pinzimonio
- Pizzelle fritte
- Polenta, polenta bianca, polenta concia, polenta dolce, polenta incassata, polenta saracena, polenta taragna (or taragna)
- Rafanata
- Rosette (or nidi di rondine)
- Rustico leccese
- Scabeggio di Moneglia
- Scagliozzi
- Sciurilli
- Scrippelle 'mbusse
- Sformato al basilico, sformato di finocchi, sformato di Pasqua, sformato di ricotta e spinaci, sformato di riso
- Sgabeo
- Sgroppino
- Strucolo di patate
- Timballo, timballo abruzzese, timballo alla teramana, timballo di maccheroni, timballo di riso
- Torta pasqualina, torta rustica
- Tortelli alla lastra
- Tortino di patate
- U' pastizz 'rtunnar
- Vellutata di zucca
- Zeppole di pasta cresciuta
- Zippula
- Zucca gratinata

=== Coffee ===
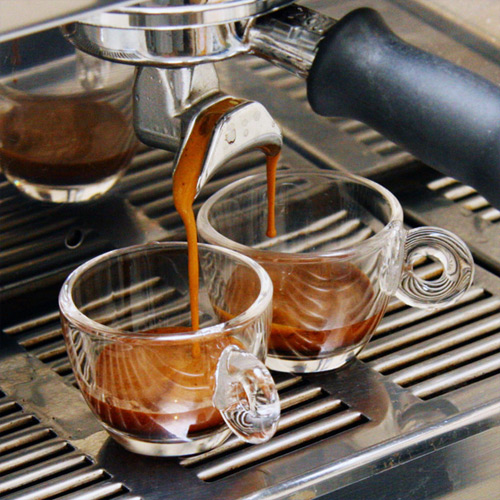
Espresso is a coffee brewed by forcing a small amount of nearly boiling water under pressure through finely ground coffee beans. The term espresso comes from the Italian esprimere, which means 'to express', and refers to the process by which hot water is forced under pressure through ground coffee.

- Affogato (or affogato al caffè)
- Bicerin
- Caffè alla napoletana – made with a caffettiera napoletana
- Caffè americano
- Caffè corretto
- Caffè d'orzo
- Caffè latte
- Caffè leccese or caffè in ghiaccio – espresso over ice with addition of almond milk instead of sugar, typical in Salento
- Caffè macchiato
- Caffè moka – made with a moka pot
- Caffè shakerato – a sweet iced coffee drink
- Cappuccino
- Doppio (or caffè doppio)
- Espressino
- Espresso (or caffè espresso)
- Latte macchiato
- Lungo (or caffè lungo)
- Marocchino
- Ristretto (or caffè ristretto)
- Uovo sbattuto "con caffè"

=== Olive oil ===
- Italian olive oil
- Calabrian chili oil

=== Vinegar ===
- Aceto balsamico
- Aceto balsamico di Modena
- Aceto balsamico tradizionale

=== Doughs ===
- Pasta frolla

=== Fruits, vegetables and legumes ===
- Arancia rossa di Sicilia
- Cipolla rossa di Tropea
- Fagiolo di Sorana
- Femminello del Gargano, interdonato di Messina, limone Costa d'Amalfi (or sfusato amalfitano), limone di Rocca Imperiale, limone di Siracusa, limone di Sorrento
- Peperone crusco, peperone di Senise
- Pomodorino del Piennolo del Vesuvio, pomodorino di Manduria, pomodoro di Pachino, pomodoro di San Marzano dell'agro sarnese-nocerino

== Ingredients ==
Most important ingredients (see also: Italian herbs and spices):

- Extra virgin olive oil
- Parmigiano Reggiano (Parmesan)
- Pecorino
- Tomato
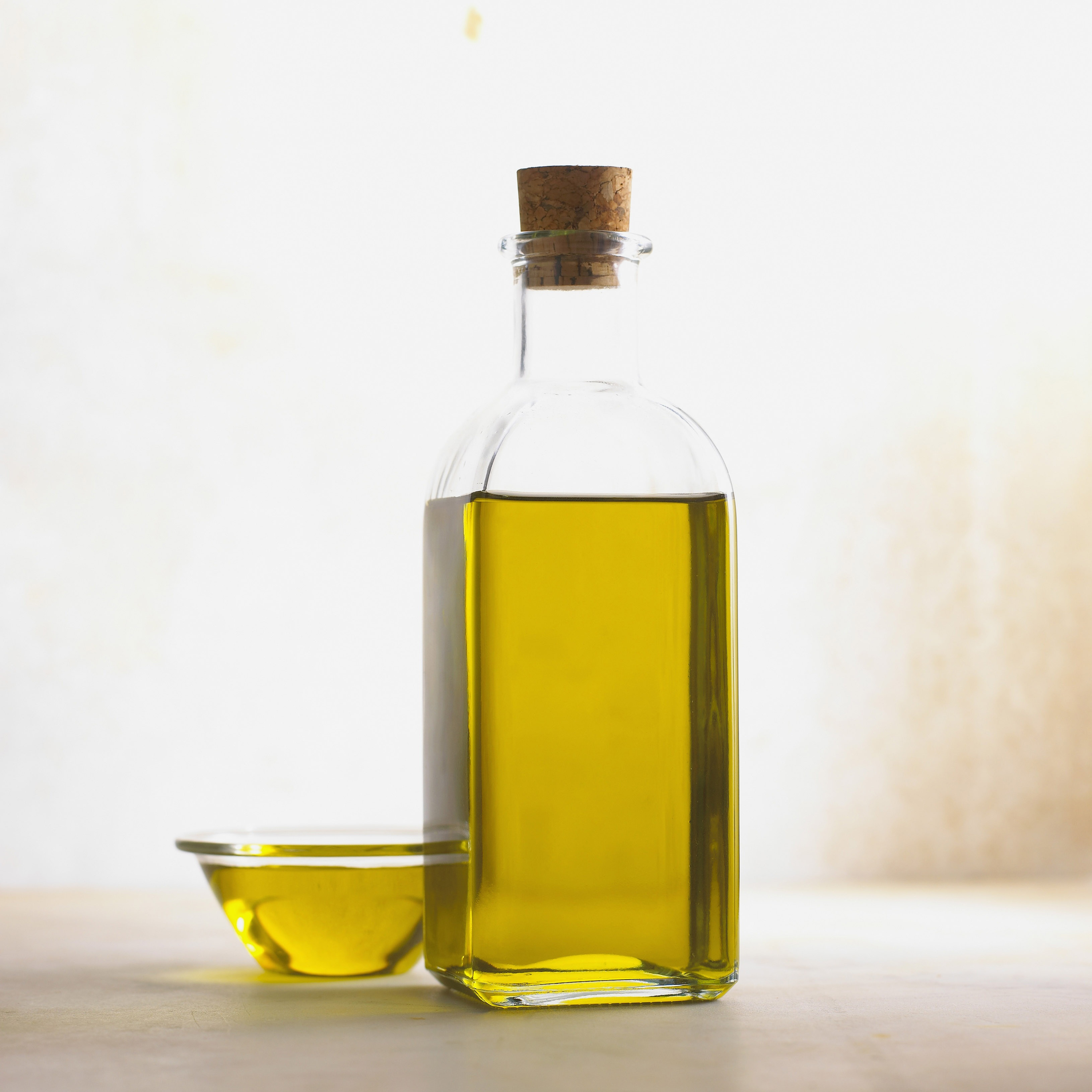
Extra virgin olive oil

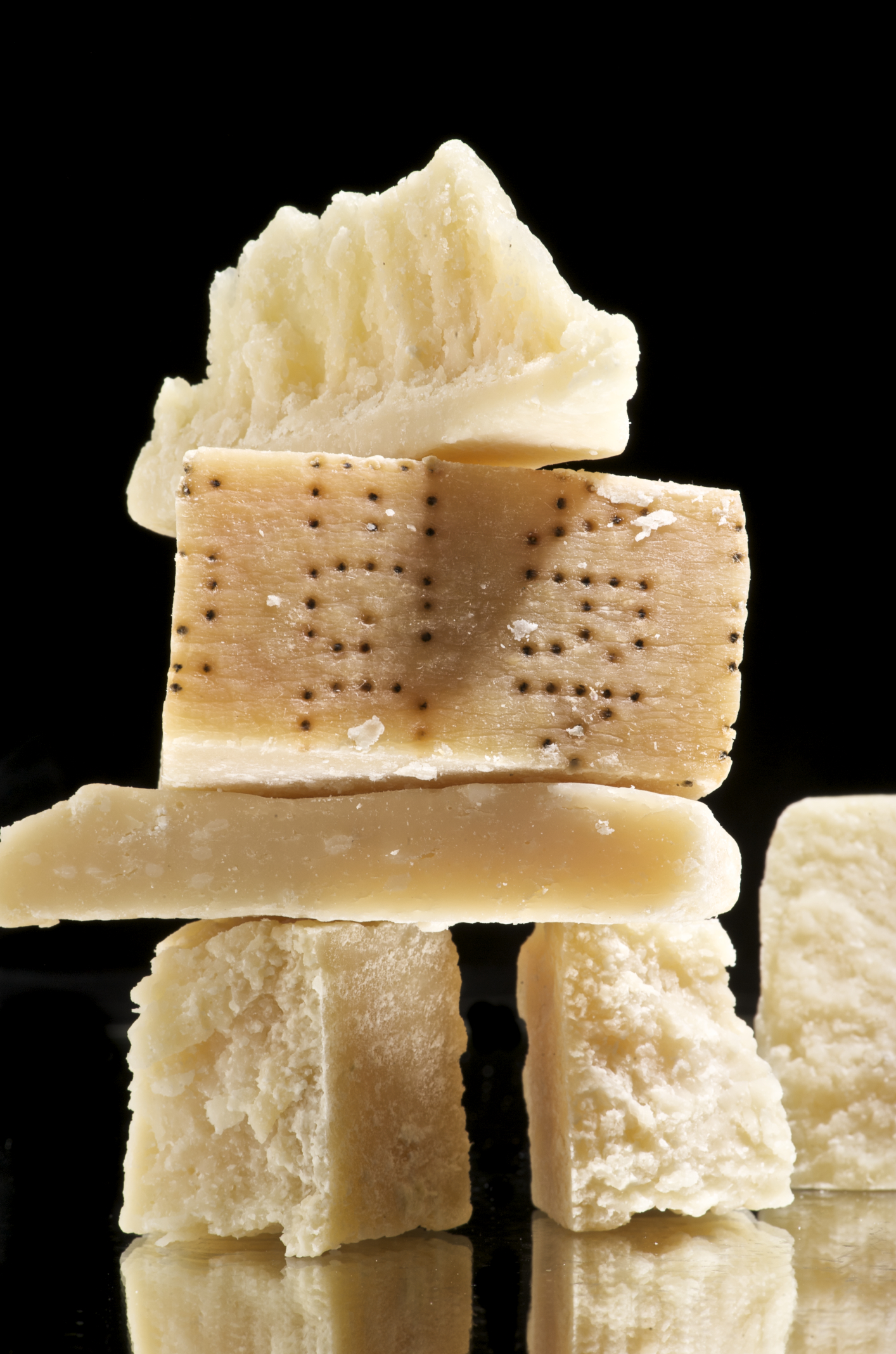
Parmigiano Reggiano (Parmesan)

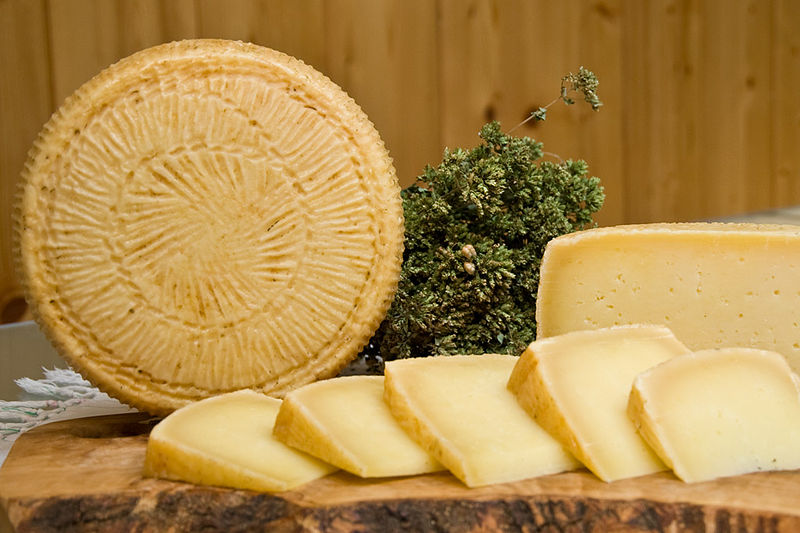
Pecorino

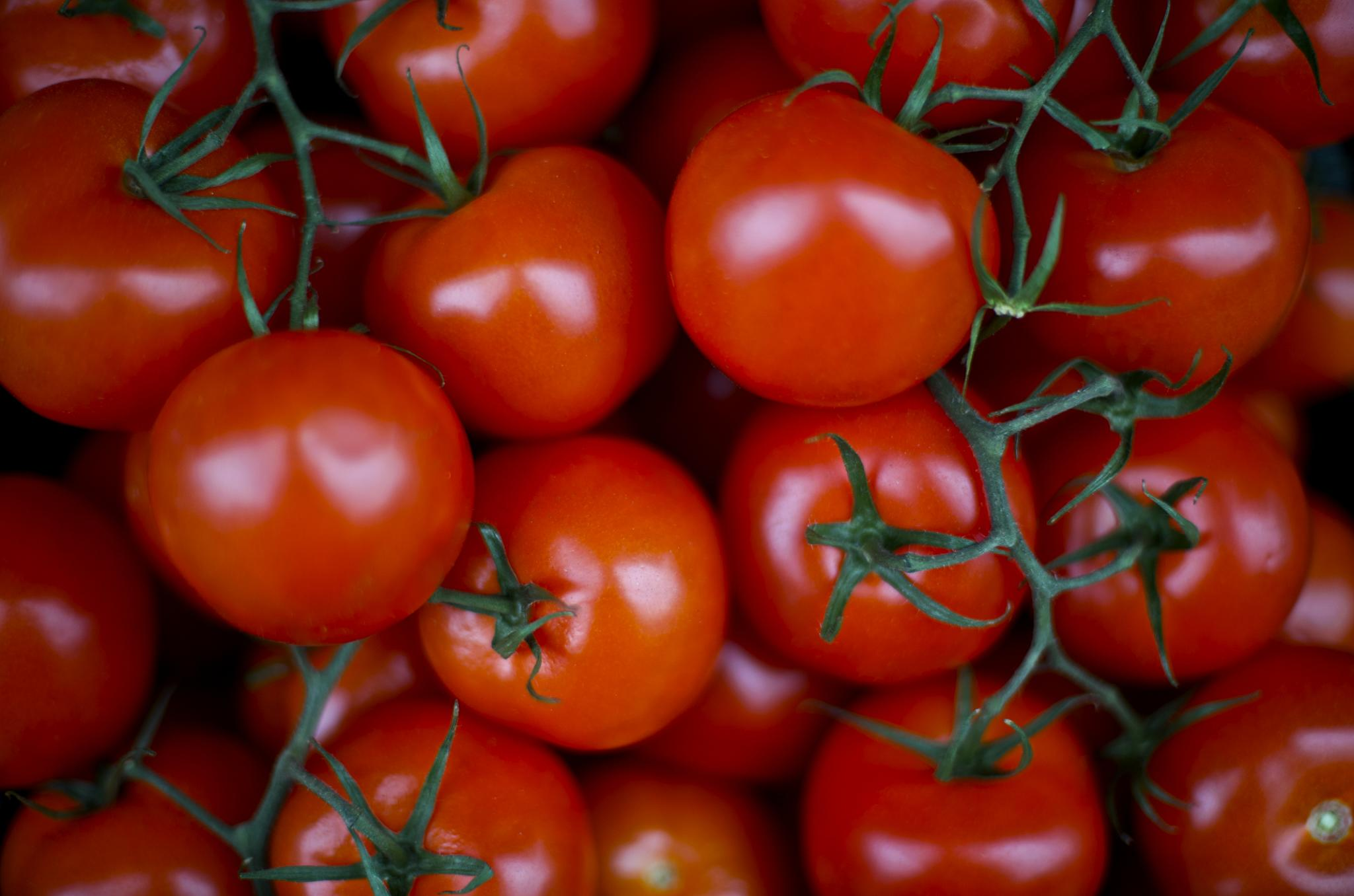
Italian vine tomatoes

=== Other common ingredients ===
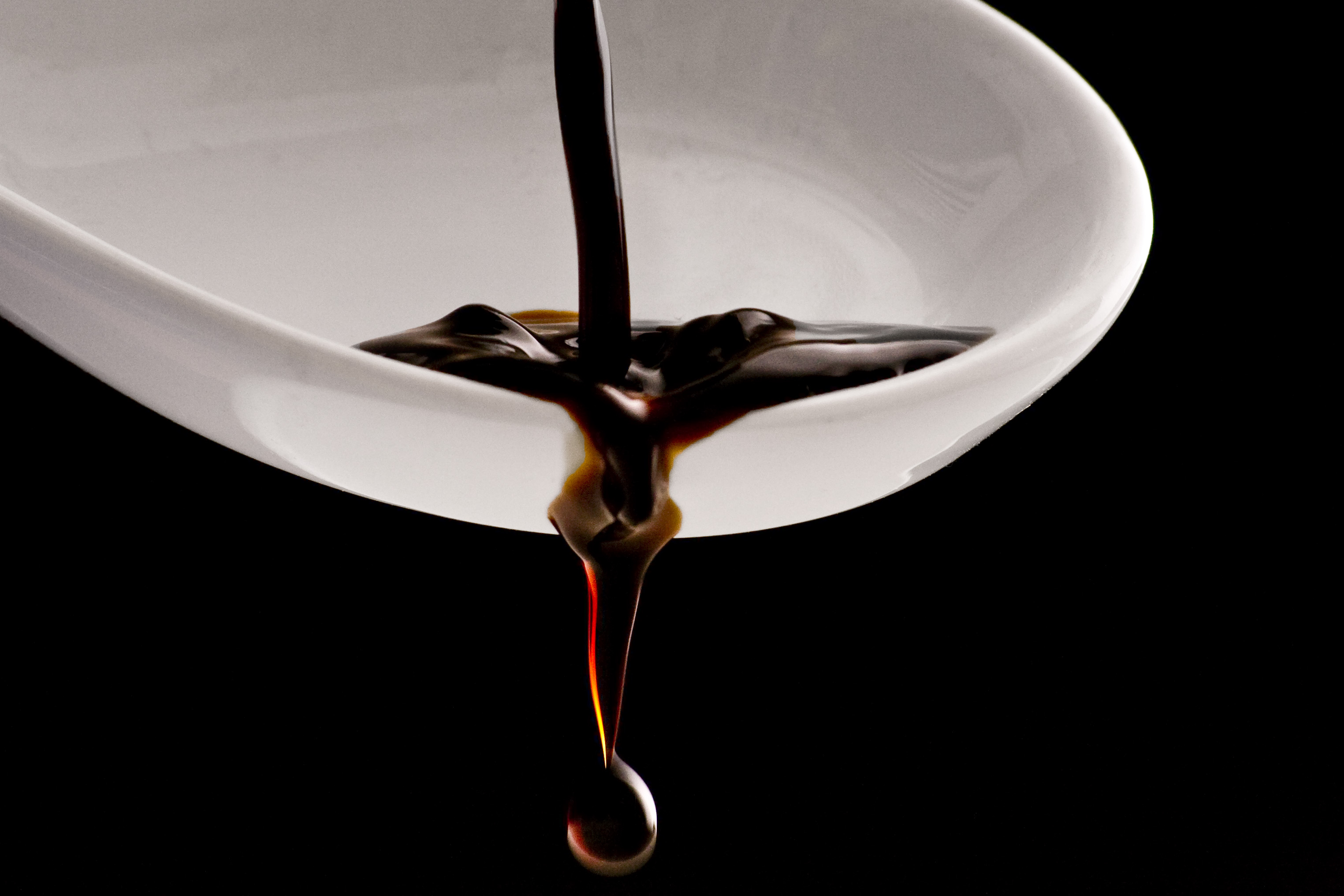
Balsamic vinegar

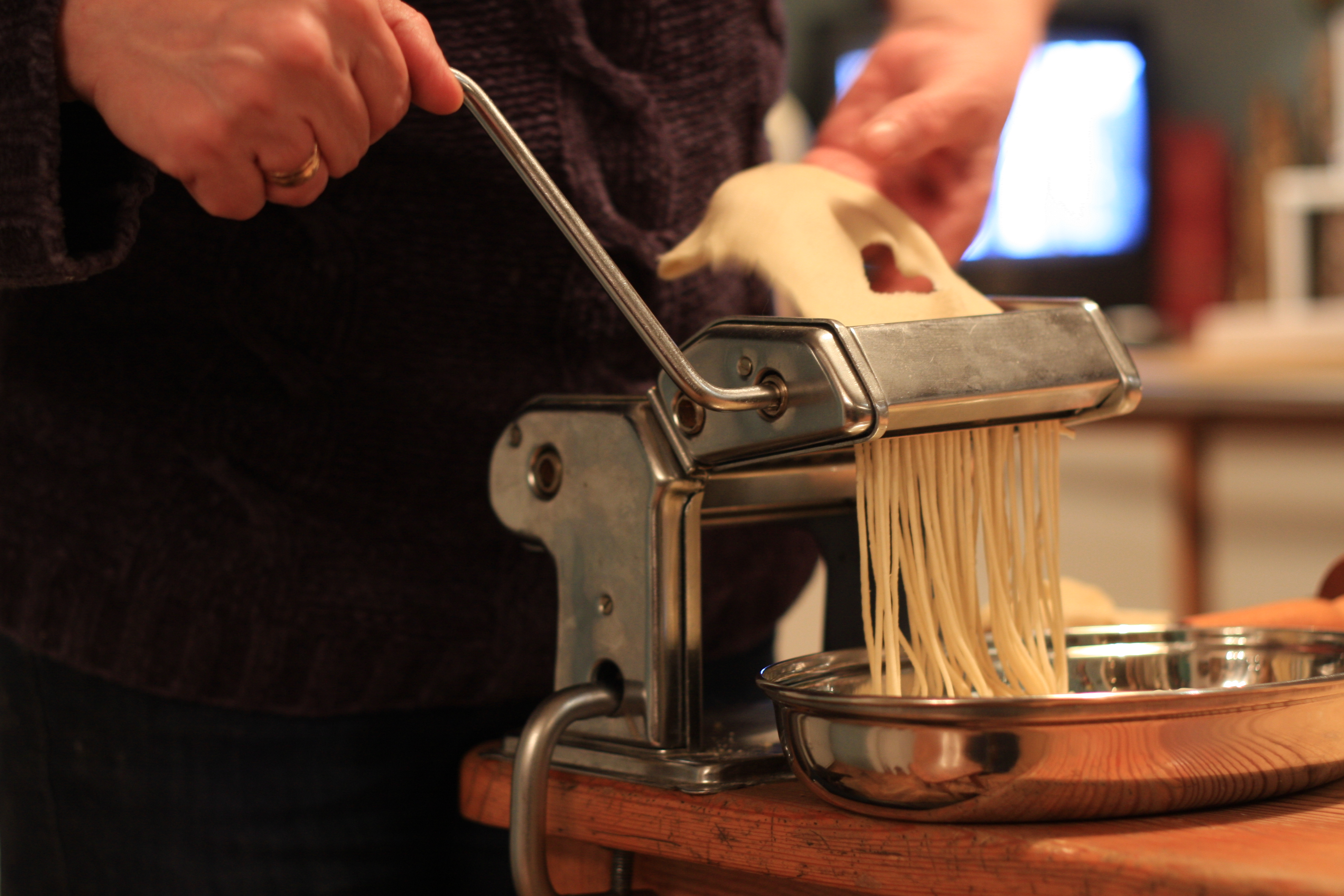
Pasta being prepared in a pasta machine

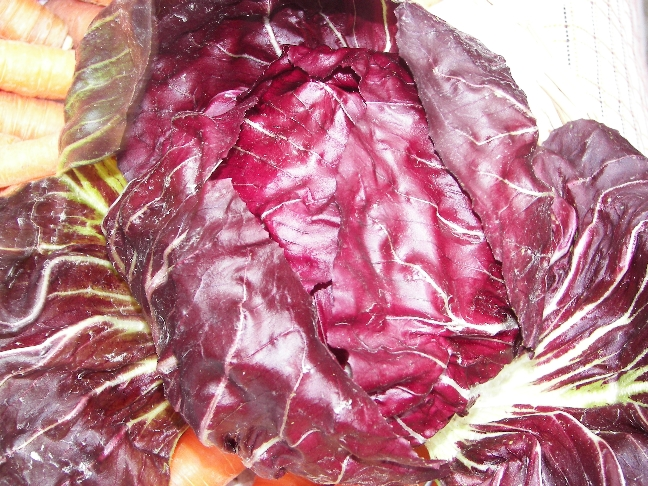
Radicchio

- Anchovies, preserved in olive oil, or in salt
- Asparagus
- Balsamic vinegar
- Baccala (dried, salted cod)
- Bresaola (air-dried salted beef)
- Broccoli
- Butter
- Capers, preserved in vinegar or, more frequently, salt
- Artichokes
- Cauliflower
- Kale
- Chickpeas
- Cucumber
- Chicory
- Sauerkraut
- Beans
- Farro ('emmer')
- Strawberries
- Porcini mushrooms, white mushrooms
- Lard
- Lentils
- Lemon
- Aubergines
- Apples
- Honey
- Hazelnuts
- Walnuts
- Olives
- Barley
- Pasta
- Potatoes
- Swordfish
- Bell peppers
- Pears
- Pestât
- Pesto
- Pine nuts
- Peas
- Pistachios
- Polenta
- Prosciutto
- Radicchio – leaf chicory, sometimes known as Italian chicory. Radicchio rosso di Treviso resembles a large red Belgian endive.
- Ricotta
- Rice
- Rocket (rucola or arugula)
- Cuttlefish
- Speck
- Spinach
- Truffle
- Tripe
- Tuna
- Grapes
- Pumpkin
- Courgette

== Herbs and spices ==
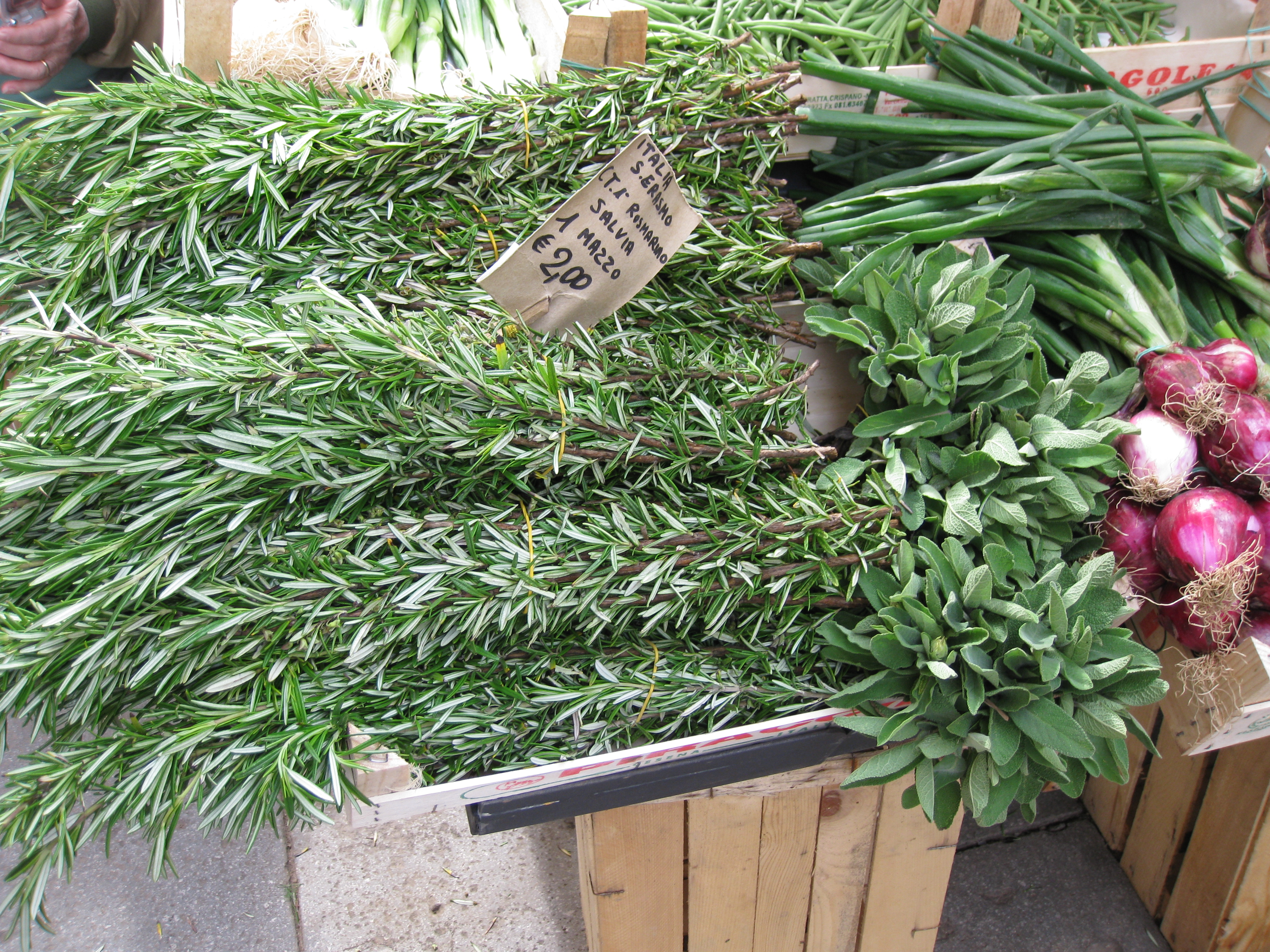
Rosemary

- Anise
- Basil
- Bay leaves
- Black pepper
- Calamint
- Chili pepper
- Chives
- Cinnamon
- Capers
- Clove
- Dill
- Garlic
- Fennel
- Horseradish
- Juniper
- Marjoram
- Mint
- Nutmeg
- Onion
- Oregano
- Parsley
- Rosemary
- Saffron
- Sage
- Starflower
- Thyme

== See also ==
- Italian cuisine
- Italian meal structure
- List of Italian restaurants
- List of Italian chefs
