= Modenese (disambiguation) =

Modenese is the demonym for the Italian city of Modena and the historical Duchy of Modena, chiefly referring to:

- Bianca Modenese, an Italian breed of cattle
- Modenese dialect, the Emilian dialect spoken in and around Modena.

It may also refer to:

== Places ==
- Fiorano Modenese, Modena, Italy

== Cuisine ==
- Crescentina modenese, an Italian bread
- Zuppa alla modenese, an Italian soup

== Other uses ==
- Banca Modenese, an Italian bank
- Modenese Masters, an Italian school of chess
