= Panozzo =

Panozzo is an Italian surname, and may refer to:

- Chuck Panozzo, Charles Salvatore Panozzo (born 1948), American musician and co-founder of the rock band Styx
- John Panozzo, John Anthony Panozzo (1948 – 1996), American drummer with the rock band Styx
- Stephanie Panozzo, Australian actress, playing Eden Fowler in the TV soap opera Home and Away

== See also ==
- Panuozzo, type of sandwich from Campania, Italy.
- 83956 Panuzzo, minor planet named after Pasquale Panuzzo (born 1972), an Italian astronomer
