= Zuppa =

Zuppa may refer to:

== Soups ==
- Zuppa pavese
- Zuppa toscana
- Zuppa alla modenese

== People with the surname ==
- Vjeran Zuppa (1940–2023), Croatian intellectual, writer and poet

== See also ==
- Zuppa Inglese, an Italian dessert
