= Zuppa del canavese =

Italian soup

- Type: Soup, casserole
- Course: Primo (Italian course)
- Place of origin: Italy
- Main ingredients: White stock, butter, grana, salt, black pepper

Zuppa del canavese is an Italian baked dish from the Canavese region of Piedmont. It consists of layers of sliced bread baked with cabbage, cheese, and broth.

== See also ==
- List of Italian soups
