= Tramezzini NYC =

Italian restaurant in New York City

- Interactive map of Tramezzini NYC

Restaurant information
- Established: December 2015
- Closed: June 2023
- Owners: Filippo Paccagnella, Massimiliano Paccagnella, Davide Pedon
- Food type: Tramezzino
- Location: 309 E Houston St, New York City, New York, 10002, United States
- Coordinates: 40°43′16″N 73°59′1″W
- Website: www.tramezzininyc.com

Tramezzini NYC was a family-owned sandwich shop and Italian eatery in New York City that was the first to serve Venetian tramezzini in the United States. The sandwich shop closed in 2023.

== History ==
Tramezzini NYC was founded and managed by two Italian brothers, Filippo Paccagnella and Massimiliano Paccagnella, who thought of the idea in 2015. Prior to starting Tramezzini NYC, Filippo Paccagnella was an architect and designer. Both grew up in Pianiga, a small village in Veneto, Italy.

In 2016, Tramezzini NYC debuted as a vendor at Smorgasburg, a popular street food fair with multiple locations in New York and Brooklyn. They became known for importing authentic bread and ingredients from Veneto, Italy.

Davide Pedon joined the owners as honorary co-founder in 2017, and they opened the first Tramezzini shop in the US In May 2019, Tramezzini NYC was invited to the NYC Food Fair in Osaka, where they introduced Venetian sandwiches in Japan.

Tramezzini NYC appeared on "Fork Yeah" by Thrillist in the episode "Meet the Tramezzino" in July 2019. and Wednesday, Feb. 3 2021 in The New York Times thanks to the idea of the "party box".

== Media reviews ==
- In April 2017, Tramezzini NYC was featured on Gothamist's "The Best Street Food Vendors in NYC".
- Tramezzini NYC was featured on Thrillist's "Best sandwiches around the world" in June 2019.
- In April 2019, Tramezzini NYC made it onto a Bloomberg list called "The Best 14 Sandwiches in New York, as Picked by Top Chefs".
