= Emilia (region) =

Historical region in Italy

Coordinates: 44°45′N 11°00′E

Emilia Emégglia / Emîlia (Emilian)
- Historical region
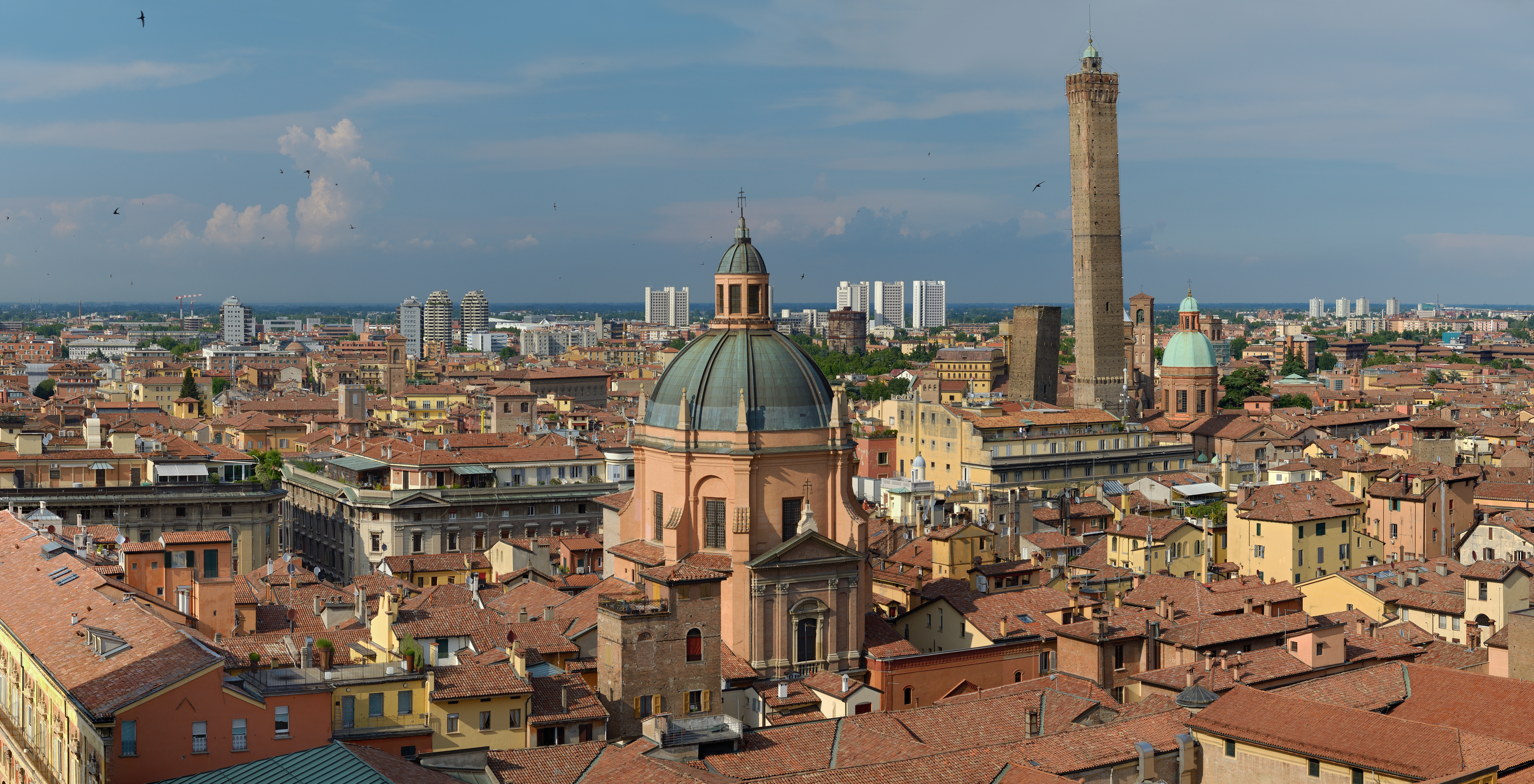
- Panorama view of Bologna, Emilia's largest city

- Coat of Arms (1682)
- Interactive map of Emilia
- Continent: Europe
- Country: Italy
- Capital: Bologna

Area
  - Total: 21,000 km^{2} (8,100 sq mi)

Population (2024)
  - Total: 3,700,000
  - Density: 180/km^{2} (460/sq mi)
- Demonym(s): English: Emilian; Emilian: Emigliàn (man); Emilian: Emiglièna (woman); Italian: Emiliano (man); Italian: Emiliana (woman)
- Time zone: UTC+1 (CET)
  - Summer (DST): UTC+2 (CEST)
- ISO 3166 code: IT-45

Emilia (Emilian: Emeja / Emégglia / Emélia) is a geographic and historical region of northern Italy. It approximately corresponds to the western and the north-eastern part of the administrative region of Emilia-Romagna, while broader definitions also include Emilian-speaking territories in other regions. Its de facto capital is Bologna, with other big cities including Parma, Modena, and Reggio-Emilia.

== Etymology ==
Emilia takes its name from the Via Aemilia, a Roman road constructed by the consul Marcus Aemilius Lepidus in 187 BCE to connect Rimini with Piacenza. The name was transferred to the district (which formed the eighth Augustan region of Italy) as early as the time of Martial, in popular usage. In the 2nd and 3rd centuries Aemilia was frequently named as a district under imperial judges (iuridici), generally in combination with Flaminia or Liguria and Tuscia.

== History ==
The district of Ravenna was, as a rule, from the 3rd to the 5th century, not treated as part of Aemilia, the chief town of the latter being Placentia (Piacenza). In the 4th century Aemilia and Liguria were joined to form a consular province; after that Aemilia stood alone, Ravenna being sometimes temporarily added to it.

Under the Byzantine Empire Ravenna became the seat of an exarch, and after the Lombards had for two centuries attempted to subdue the Pentapolis (Ravenna, Bologna, Forlì, Faenza, Rimini), Pepin took these cities from the Lombard king Aistulf and gave them, with the March of Ancona, to the papacy in 755, to which, under the name of Romagna, they continued to belong. At first, however, the archbishop of Ravenna was in reality supreme. The other chief cities of Emilia—Ferrara, Modena, Reggio, Parma, Piacenza—were, on the other hand, independent, and in the period of the communal independence of the individual towns of Italy each of the chief cities of Emilia, whether belonging to Romagna or not, had a history of its own. Notwithstanding the feuds of Guelphs and Ghibellines, they prospered considerably. The study of Roman law, especially at Bologna, acquired great importance. The imperial influence kept the papal power in check.

Pope Nicholas III obtained control of Romagna in 1278, but the papal dominion almost fell during the Avignon Papacy, and was only maintained by the efforts of Cardinal Albornoz, who was sent to Italy by Pope Innocent VI in 1353. Even so, however, papal supremacy existed in little more than name only. This state of affairs only ceased when Cesare Borgia crushed most of the petty princes of Romagna, intending to found a dynasty of his own there.

Upon the death of Pope Alexander VI it was his successors in the papacy who carried on and profited by what Cesare Borgia had begun. Bologna and the others towns were thenceforth subject to the church and administered by cardinal legates. The Duchy of Ferrara and Comacchio remained under the House of Este until the death of Alfonso II in 1597, when they were claimed by Pope Clement VIII as vacant fiefs.

Modena and Reggio, which were legally Imperial fiefs, but had in fact formed part of the Ferrara duchy, became thenceforth separate dukedoms in personal union under a branch of the house of Este. Parma and Piacenza were at first under the House of Farnese, Pope Paul III having placed his son Pier Luigi in that role in 1545, and then, after the extinction of the Farnese in 1731, under a branch of the Bourbons of Spain that originated from Elisabeth Farnese, the last shon of her family and at the time powerful Queen Consort of Spain.

Carpi, Correggio, and Mirandola were three of the numerous small fiefdoms which also existed in Emilia and which were generally destined to be gradually absorbed by the two larger states. The County of Carpy passed to the house of Este in 1530 after the dispossession of the Pio di Savoia family for 'felony' decreed five years earlier by Emperor Charles V, and was elevated to a principality in 1535. About a century later, in 1635, the Modena and Reggio branch of the House of Este were also invested with the Principality of Correggio by Emperor Ferdinand II, after it had been confiscated five years earlier from the Da Correggio family on charges of having minted counterfeit money. The last of the Pico dynasty of Mirandola, Francesco Maria Pico, having sided with the French in the War of the Spanish Succession, was deprived of his duchy in 1709 by Emperor Joseph I, who sold it as usual to the house of Este in 1710.

The Duchy of Guastalla, for its part, was annexed to the Duchy of Parma and Piacenza in 1748 with the Treaty of Aix-la-Chapelle, after the extinction in 1746 of the Guastalla line of the House of Gonzaga. In 1728 another branch of the same House, which had ruled the County of Novellara and Bagnolo for almost 350 years, had also died out, but in this case the fiefdom was granted in 1737 by Emperor Charles VI to Duke Rinaldo I of Modena and Reggio in recognition for his services during the War of the Polish Succession.

From 1796 to 1814, Emilia was first incorporated in the Napoleonic Italian republic and then in the Napoleonic Italian kingdom; after 1815 there was a return to the status quo ante, Romagna returning to the papacy and its ecclesiastical government, the duchy of Parma being given to Marie Louise, wife of the deposed Napoleon, and Modena to archduke Francis of Austria, the heir of the last Este. In 1821 and in 1831 there were unsuccessful attempts at revolt in Emilia; another attempt in 1848 to 1849 was crushed by Austrian troops. In 1859, the struggle for independence was finally successful, Emilia passing to the Italian kingdom almost without resistance.

== Symbols ==
=== Flag ===
Considering that Emilia has never been constituted as a political entity, being either split between several duchies or combined with Romagna, Emilia has never had an official flag, nor does a widespread popular Emilian flag exist. However, some flags have been proposed.

Flag of Emilia (2019), combining the red on white cross (used by Bologna and Reggio Emilia) together with the blue on gold cross (used by Parma and Modena).

Flag of Emilia as proposed by Lega Nord

Flag of Emilia as proposed by the magazine Quaderni Padani

== Territory ==
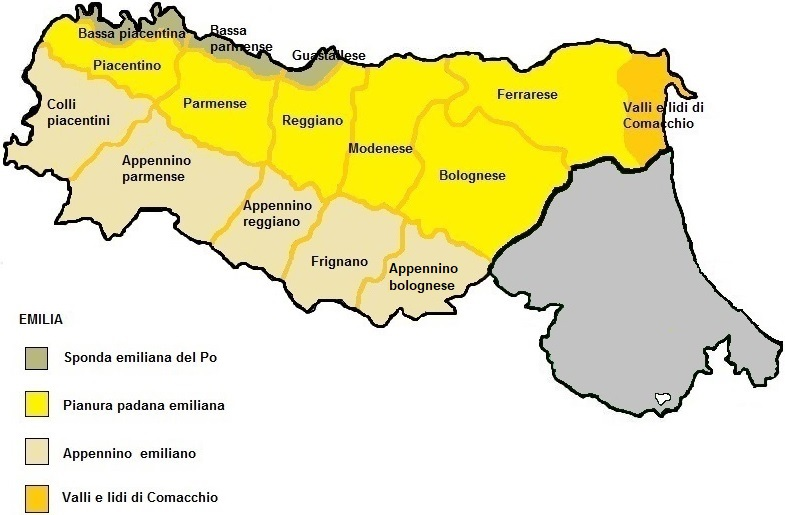
Emilian part (yellow) of Emilia-Romagna

Emilia can either be defined by administrative borders, which refers to the western and northern part of Emilia-Romagna, or linguistically, based on the linguistic area of the Emilian language. Administratively, it comprises the provinces of Bologna (except for Imola, Dozza, and the valley of the Santerno), Ferrara, Modena, Parma, Piacenza, Reggio Emilia. The rest of the entire region is considered part of Romagna. Concretely, the historical boundary between Emilia and Romagna is the Sillaro river.

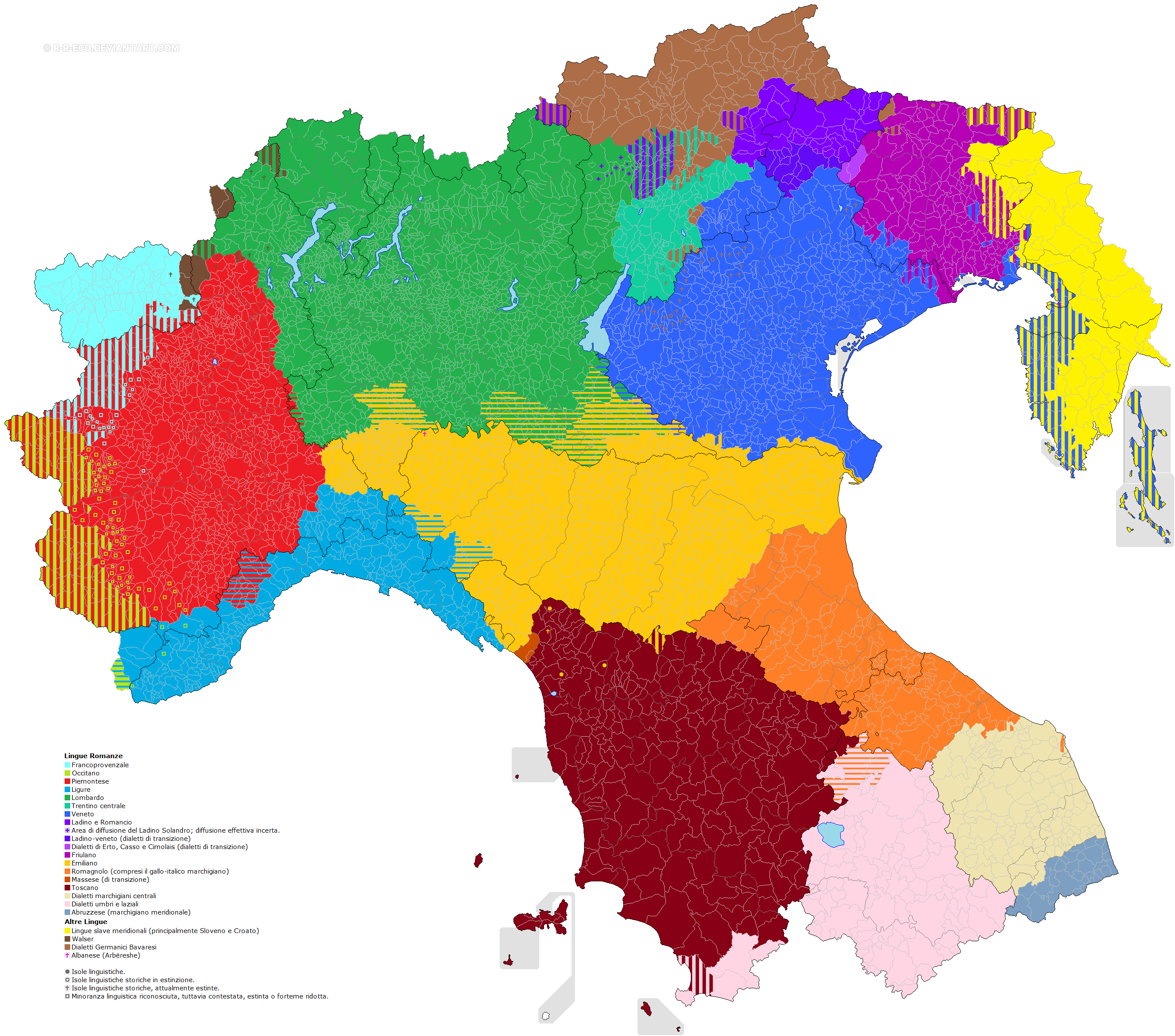
The Emilian language area (dark yellow) among the languages areas in the north of Italy.

Linguistically, Emilia is defined by the extent of the Emilian language, which borders the language areas of Lombard, Venetian, Romagnol, Tuscan, Ligurian, and Piedmontese. According to this definition, Emilia does not only include the Emilian-speaking territories of Emilia-Romagna, but also those of surrounding regions.

=== Historical regions ===
Traditionally, Emilia is divided into the following regions.

- Bolognese (or Bulagnaiṡ), with capital in Bologna.
- Ferrarese (or Frarés), with capital in Ferrara.
- Lunesana, with capital in Carrara.
- Modenese (or Mudnés), with capital in Modena.
- Oltrepò Mantovano (or Oltrèpo Mantuàn), with capital in Suzzara.
- Oltrepò Pavese (or Ultrepo Paves), with capital in Voghera.
- Reggiano (or Arzân), with capital in Reggio Emilia.
- Parmigiano (or Pramzàn), with capital in Parma.
- Piacentino (or Piasintëin), with capital in Piacenza.
- Tortonese (or Turtunes), with capital in Tortona.

=== Largest settlements ===
The most populous city in Emilia is Bologna, which has a metropolitan area with 1,020,865 inhabitants.

== Language ==
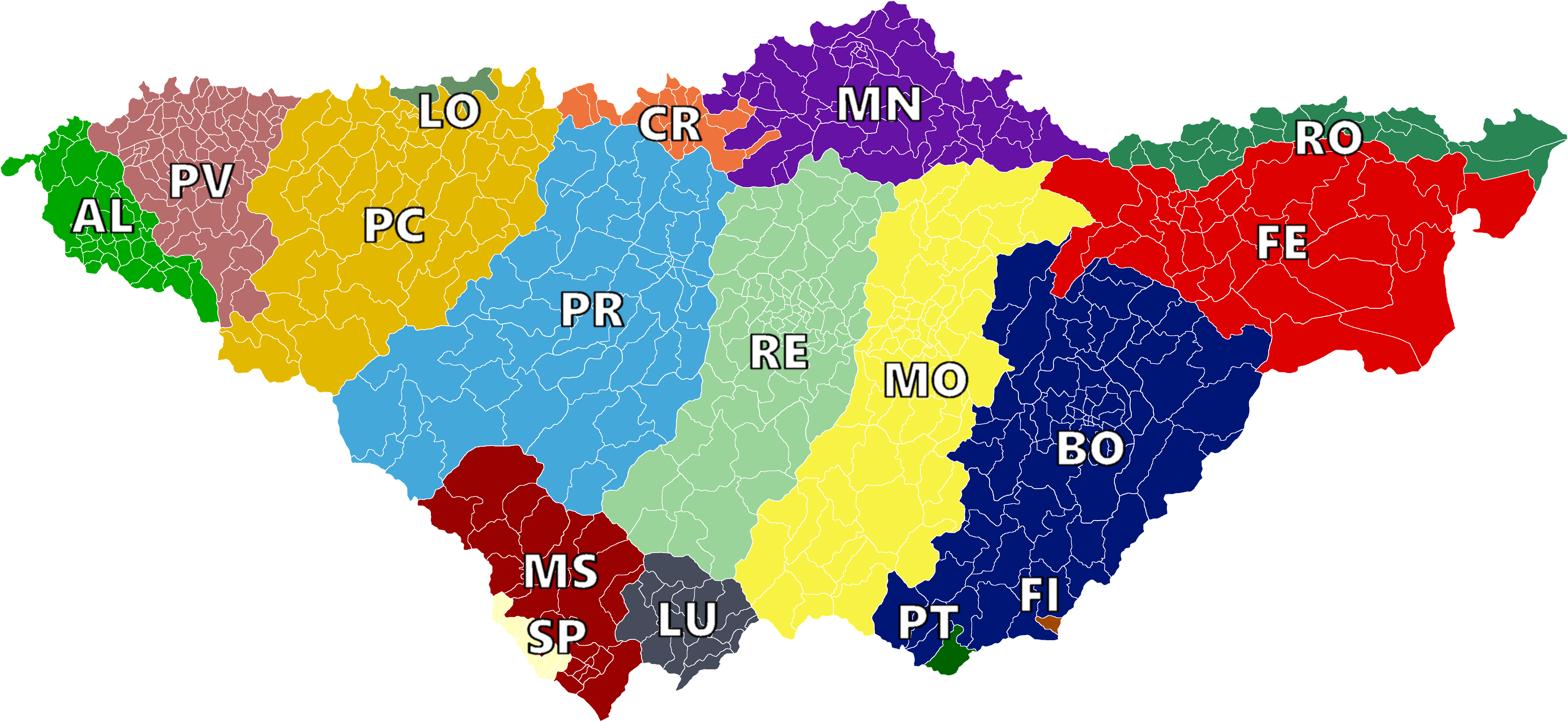
Linguistic map of Emilian

Although Italian is the most widely spoken language today, the local Emilian language is also spoken.
