= Pannini =

Pannini may refer to:

- A misspelling of panini (sandwich), which is a name and also the plural of "panino"
- Giovanni Paolo Pannini, Italian 18th century painter of vedutas and other vistas
