= Italian wedding soup =

Italian soup with meat and greens

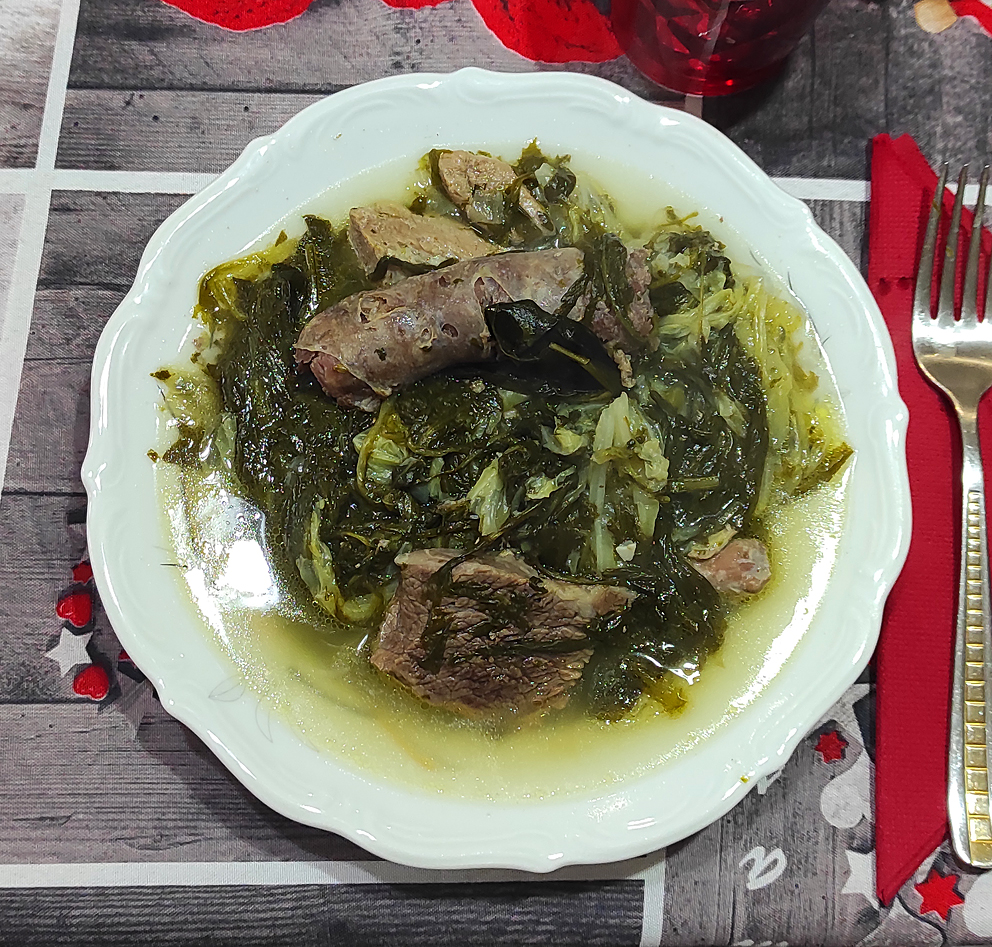
- Alternative names: Minestra maritata (in Italian)
- Course: Primo (Italian course)
- Place of origin: Italy

Italian wedding soup, known in Italian as minestra maritata, (Note: Other names include pignato maritato and pignato grasso.) is an Italian soup consisting of green vegetables and meat in broth. It is central to Neapolitan cuisine, described by food writer Arthur Schwartz as "the king of Neapolitan soups". An Italian-American version of pasta, greens and meatballs in a broth is a staple of Italian restaurants and diners in the United States.

== Italy ==
=== Name and origin ===
The name wedding soup comes from a mistranslation of the Italian minestra maritata, which translates as 'married soup'. The dish has no association with weddings in Italy. Instead, its name references a marriage of the meat and vegetables inside the broth. The pairing is gendered, with porcine meat representing a man and green vegetables a woman. This cultural metaphor is elaborated on by the Neapolitan food writer Nello Oliviero, emphasizing the contrast of the fat of the pig with the delicacy of the vegetables:

[It takes] time, competence, patience and money [to make a great marriage]. The vegetables must be selected for variety and picked over, washed many times. The husband is put on to bubble in his broth, which must be skimmed, defatted, strained and, at the end, clarified, so that it becomes limpid and of an amber hue. It is in this broth that the vegetables become tender.

In the telling of Neapolitan historian Vittorio Gleijeses, Italian wedding soup originated in Naples, though perhaps as the Spanish stew olla podrida adapted to local ingredients.

=== Variations ===
Italian wedding soup is eaten across Italy. The 2009 English edition of La Cucina del Bel Paese, the Accademia italiana della cucina's compilation of regional recipes across Italy included recipes from five regions, including Veneto and Piedmont in the north, and Apulia in the south. Preparations ranged widely, with the only commonality being a meaty stock, and in four regions, the inclusion of greens. The Italian wedding soup of Veneto, distinct from that of other regions, was made with chicken stock, rice, and the ribbon pasta tagliolini.

In southern Italy, Italian wedding soup is an example of the large soups that are common, often prepared around ingredients that are believed to pair well. Most of these soups contain some form of pasta, with Italian wedding soup being a rare exception. (Note: In The Washington Post, food writer G. Daniela Galarza found pasta included in some preparations of Italian wedding soup, but does not distinguish whether these are Italian or Italian-American preparations.) In the late 16th century, the prelate Giovanni Battista del Tufo described the soup as "the daily food of the true Neapolitan", affirmed by Schwartz, who wrote it was "the mainstay of the people before pasta became the staff of life".

Like pasta, tomato is often omitted, as the dish's origin predates their introduction to Italy. The greens that are included are typically a mix, often two or three among cabbage, chicory, dandelions, endive, fennel greens, or foraged greens. In Campania, broccoli rabe is a key ingredient, described by Schwartz as "essential, a law". In Naples, the pork penzetelle is preferred among sausages. It is an assemblage, made from the offcuts of meat.

== America ==
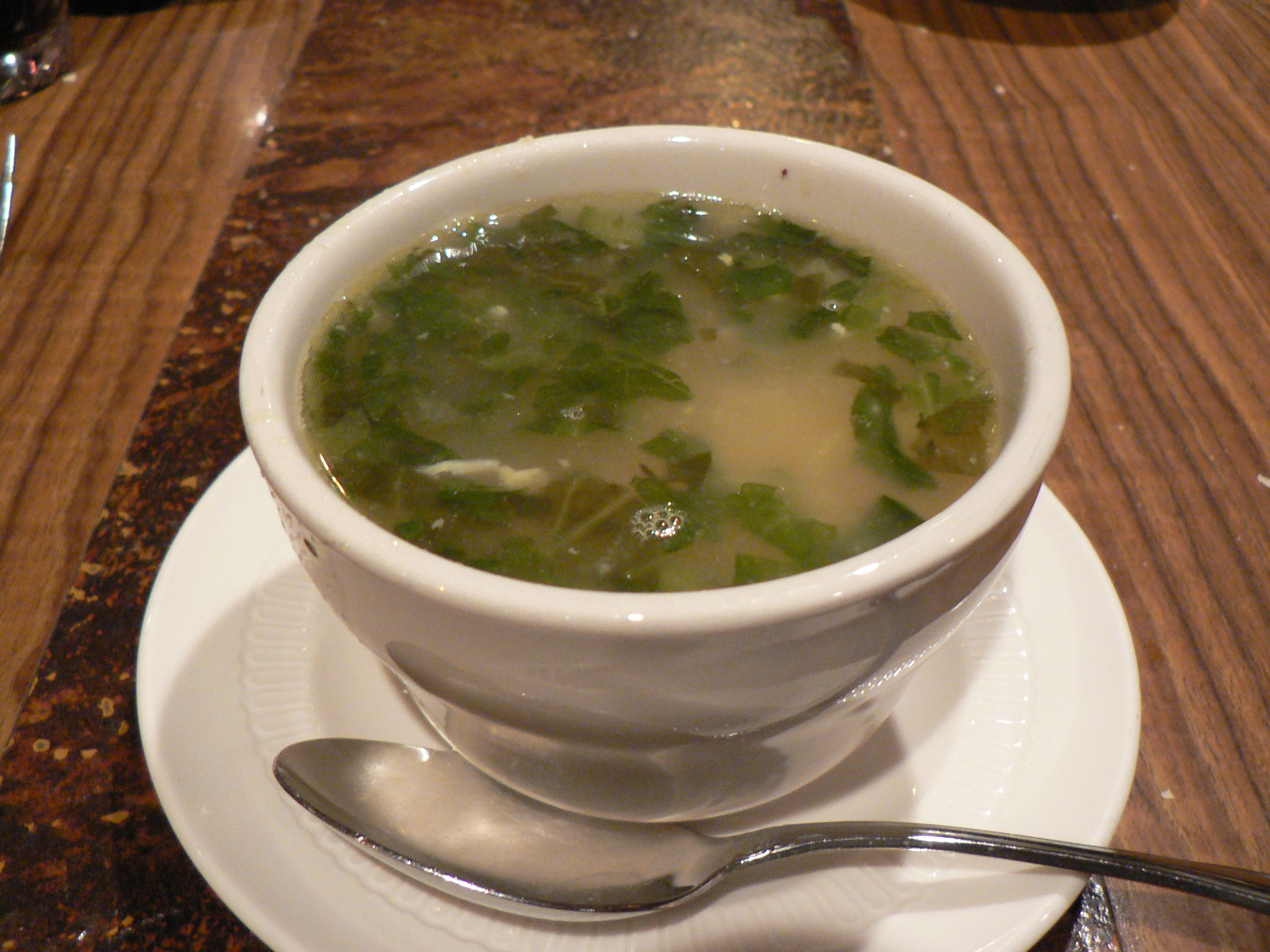
An Italian-American version of Italian wedding soup

Meatballs are unique to the Italian-American preparation of Italian wedding soup, added by Italian immigrants upon their arrival to America. Over time, escarole became particularly popular as the element of greens. Today, the most readily recognized version of Italian wedding soup is that made by companies and restaurants such as Rao's, Progresso, and Olive Garden—pasta, greens, and meatballs in broth.

== See also ==
- List of Italian soups
