= List of Italian soups =

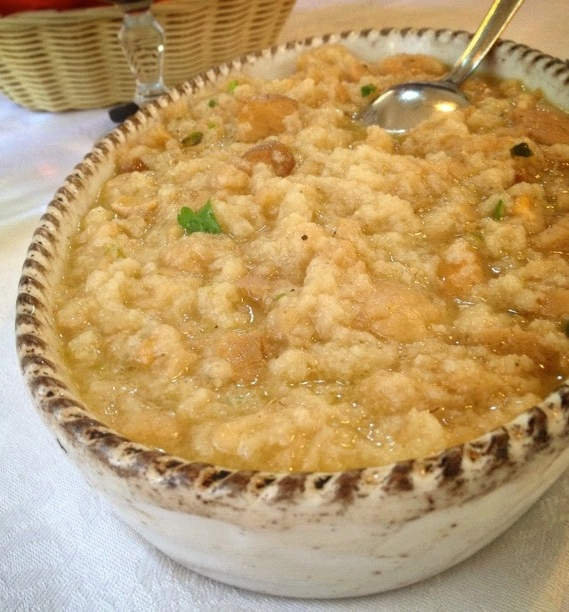
Acquacotta

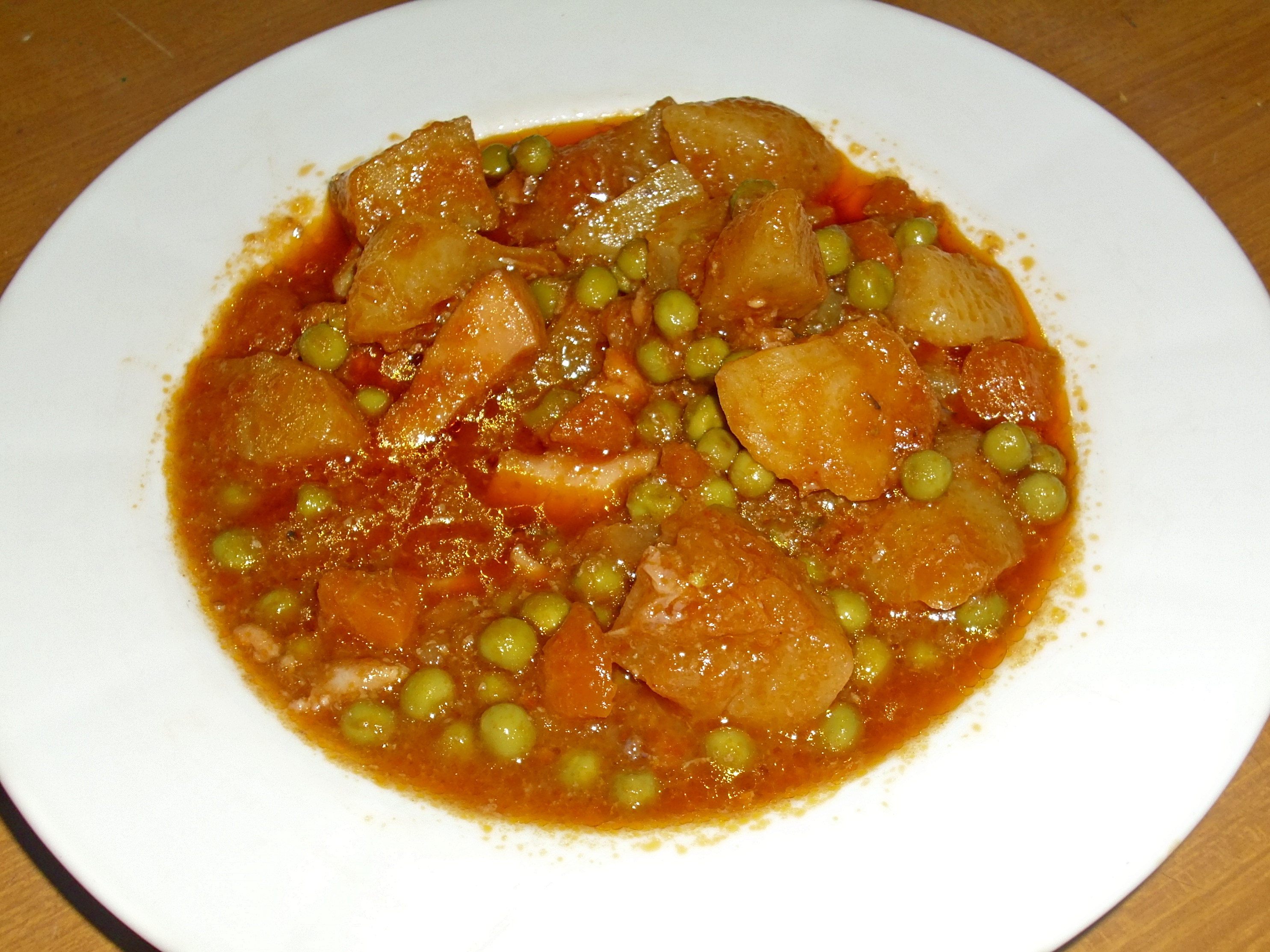
Buridda of cuttlefish and peas, a typical Ligurian dish

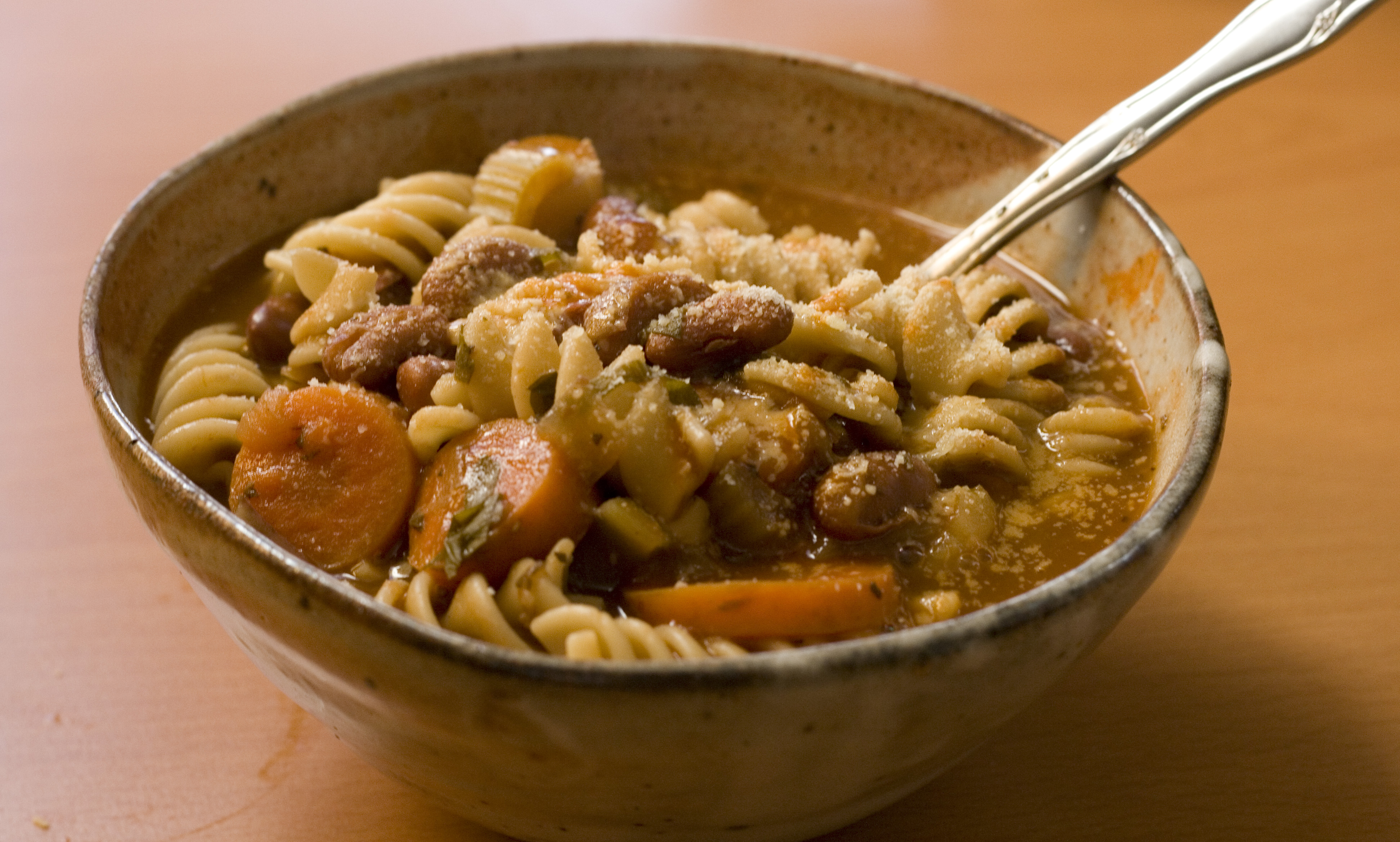
Minestrone

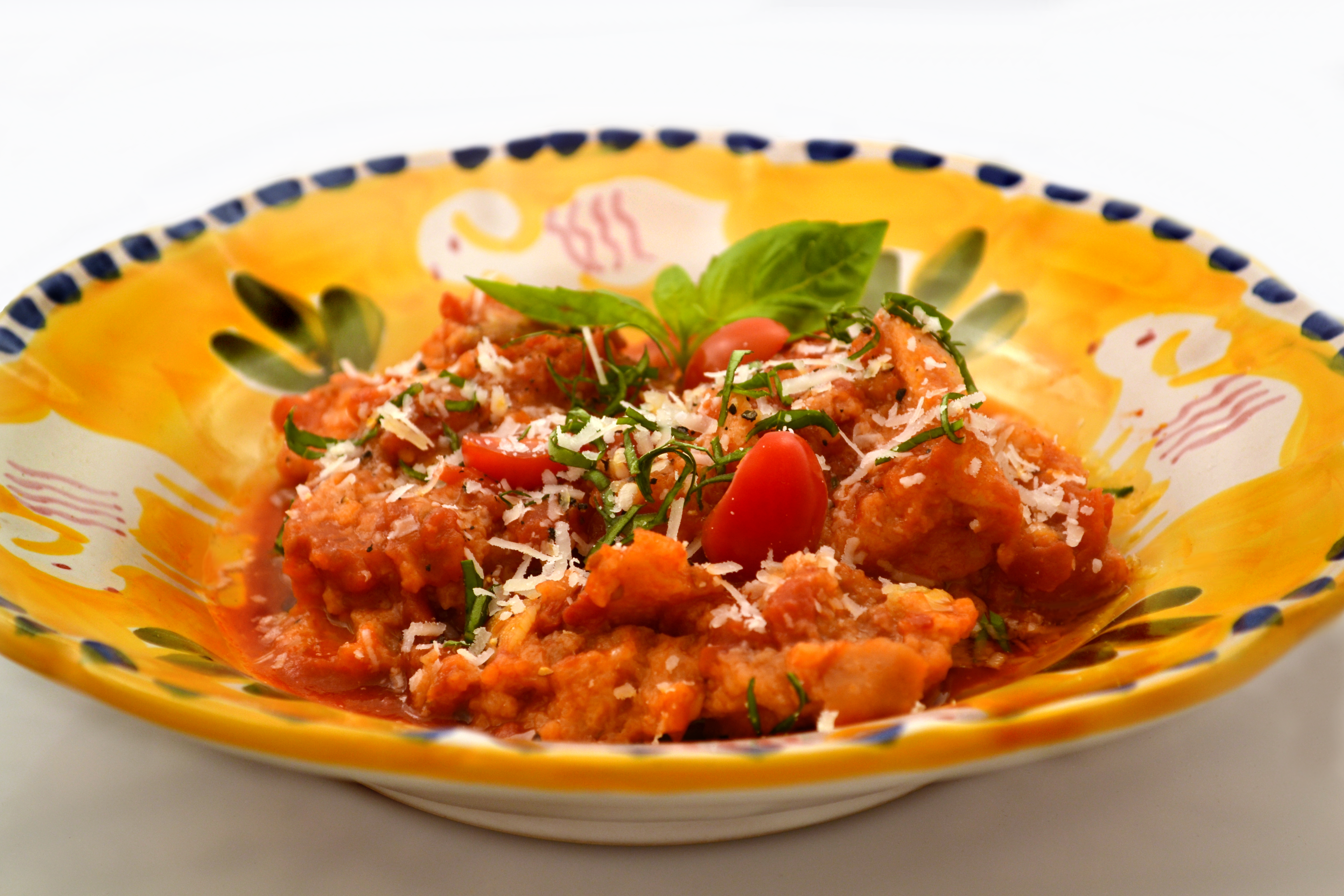
Pappa al pomodoro

This is a list of notable Italian soups. Soups are sometimes served as the primo (first course) in Italian cuisine. In some regions of Italy, such as Veneto, soup is eaten more than pasta.

== Italian soups ==
- Acquacotta – originally a peasant food, its preparation and consumption dates back to ancient history.
- Bagnun – based mainly on anchovies
- Buridda – a seafood soup or stew from Liguria, northern Italy
- Garmugia – originated in Lucca, Tuscany, central Italy
- Ginestrata – originated in Tuscany, northern Italy, it can be described as a thin, lightly spiced egg-based soup.
- Macaroni soup – a traditional dish in Italy that is sometimes served with beans, which is known as pasta e fagioli
- Maccu – a Sicilian soup and also a foodstuff that is prepared with dried and crushed fava beans (also known as broad beans) and fennel as primary ingredients. It dates back to ancient history.
- Minestra di ceci – prepared with chickpeas as a main ingredient, it is a common soup in the Abruzzo region of central Italy.
- Minestra maritata or Italian wedding soup
- Minestrone – a thick soup made with vegetables, often with the addition of pasta or rice. Common ingredients include beans, onions, celery, carrots, stock, and tomatoes.
- Panada – in northeastern Italy, it serves as an inexpensive meal in the poor areas of the countryside. It may be enriched with eggs, beef broth, and grated cheese. It was frequently prepared as a meal for elderly or ill people.
- Pappa al pomodoro – a thick Tuscan soup typically prepared with fresh tomatoes, bread, olive oil, garlic, basil, and various other fresh ingredients
- Ribollita – a famous Tuscan soup, a hearty potage made with bread and vegetables. There are many variations, but the main ingredients always include leftover bread, cannellini beans and inexpensive vegetables such as carrot, cabbage, beans, silverbeet, cavolo nero, and onion. Its name literally means 'reboiled'.
- Sciusceddu – prepared using meatballs and eggs as primary ingredients
- Stracciatella – consists of meat broth and small shreds of an egg-based mixture, prepared by drizzling the mixture into boiling broth and stirring.
- Walnut soup – prepared in the Piedmont region of northern Italy, which has a significant amount of walnut groves
- Zuppa alla modenese – made with stock, spinach, butter, salt, eggs, Parmesan cheese, nutmeg, and croutons
- Zuppa del canavese – made from white stock, tomato puree, butter, carrot, celery, onion, cauliflower, bacon fat, Parmesan cheese, parsley, sage, salt, and pepper
- Zuppa toscana – made with sausage, crushed red peppers, diced white onion, bacon, garlic puree, chicken bouillon, heavy cream, and potatoes
- Pescatore soup

== See also ==
- List of Italian dishes
