= Ginestrata =

Italian egg-based soup

Ginestrata is an Italian soup, originally from Tuscany, which can be described as a thin, lightly spiced egg-based soup. Egg yolks, chicken stock, Marsala wine or white wine, butter, nutmeg and sugar are primary ingredients. Additional ingredients may include different types of wine, such as Madeira wine, and cinnamon. It may also be served as an antipasto dish, the first course of a formal Italian meal.

Ginestrata may be strained using a sieve. It may be prepared using a double boiler for cooking, and the nutmeg and sugar may be served atop it as a garnish. It may also be cooked in an earthenware pot. It is a thin soup that only slightly thickens when the cooking process is complete.

== History ==
The soup dates to the Middle Ages in Tuscany, Italy, when it was prepared by the families of married people the day after their wedding, to "revive the flagging spirits of the bride and groom".

== See also ==
- List of Italian soups
