= Viva la pappa col pomodoro =

1964 song by Lina Wertmüller and Nino Rota

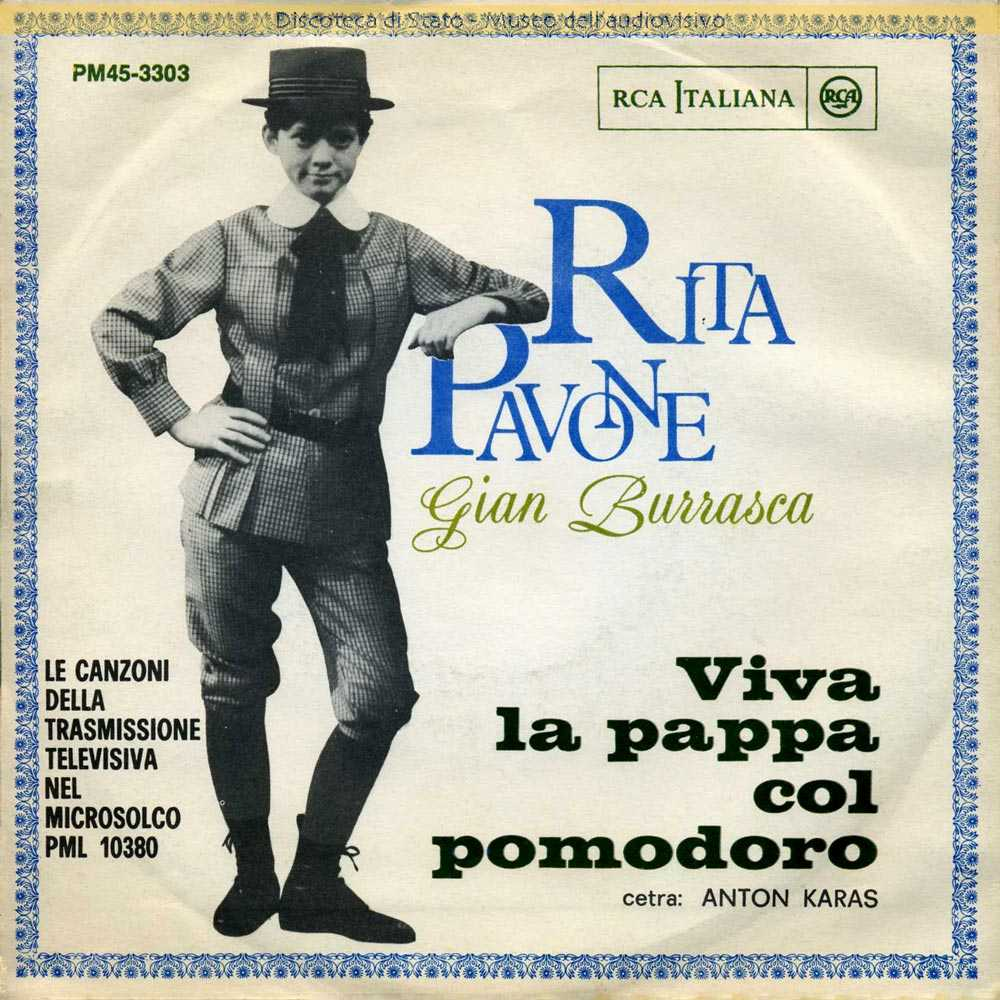

Single by Rita Pavone

from the album Gian Burrasca
- B-side: "Sei la mia mamma"
- Released: December 1964
- Recorded: 1964
- Genre: Pop; children's
- Length: 2:02
- Label: RCA Italiana
- Songwriters: Lina Wertmüller; Nino Rota

Rita Pavone singles chronology
"L'amore mio" (1964)	"Viva la pappa col pomodoro" (1964)	"Lui" (1965)

Audio
- "Viva la pappa col pomodoro" on YouTube

"Viva la pappa col pomodoro" ("Long Live Tomato Mush") is a 1964 song composed by Lina Wertmüller and Nino Rota, arranged by Luis Bacalov and performed by Rita Pavone. The song was part of the RAI television adaptation Il Giornalino di Gian Burrasca, in which Pavone performs the song as the titular character.

== Track listing ==
No.	Title	Writer(s)	Length
1.	"Viva la pappa col pomodoro"	Wertmüller – Rota	2:02
2.	"Sei la mia mamma"	Wertmüller – Rota	3:17

== Charts ==
Chart (1964–65)	Peak position
Argentina (CAPIF)	7
Austria (Ö3 Austria Top 40)	11
Italy (Musica e dischi)	3
Spain (AFYVE)	9
West Germany (Media Control)	35
