= Pappa al pomodoro =

Italian soup

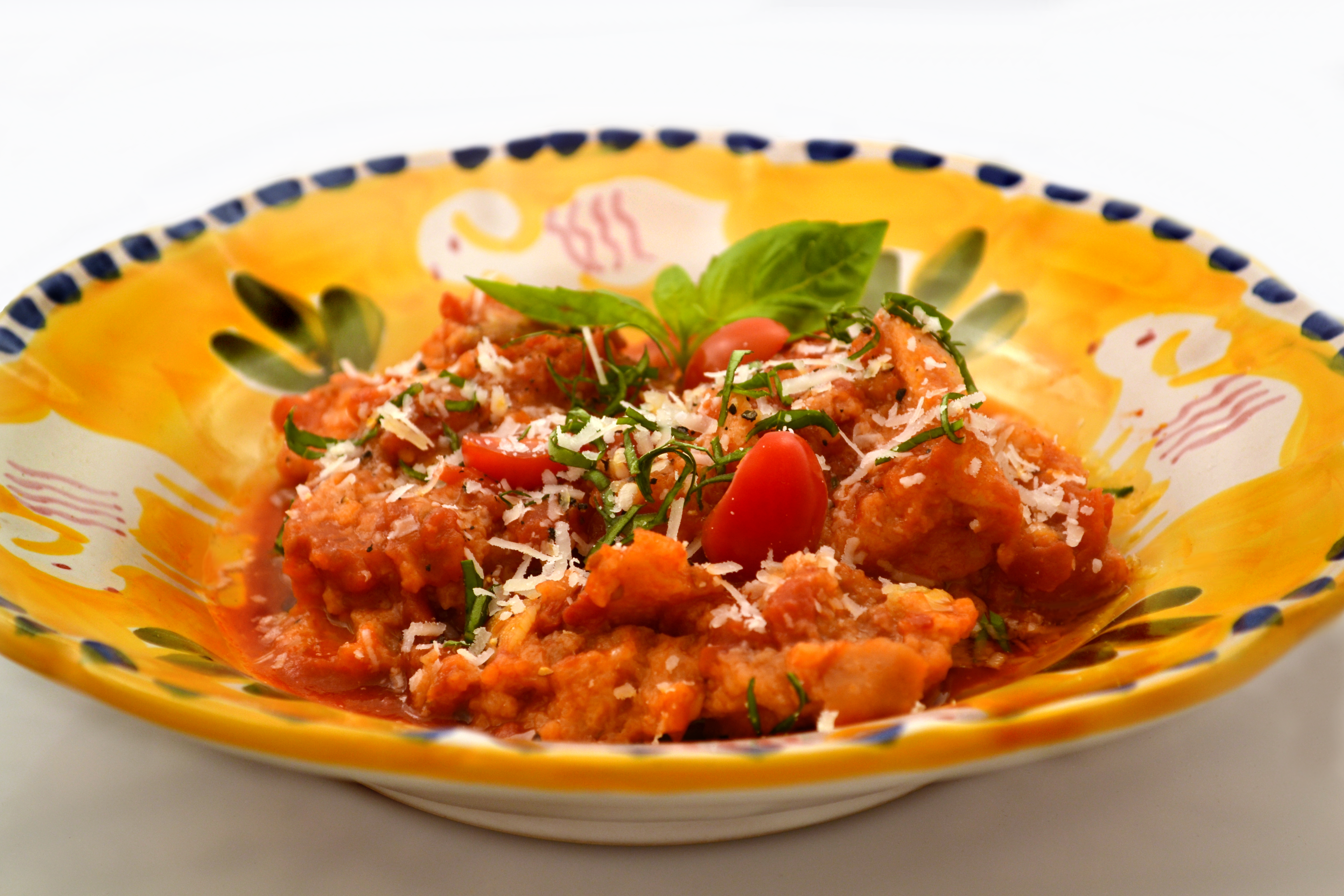
- Type: Soup
- Place of origin: Italy
- Region or state: Tuscany
- Main ingredients: Tomatoes, bread, olive oil, garlic, basil

A common method of cooking the dish

Pappa al pomodoro (Italian: [ˈpappa al pomoˈdɔːro]; translating to 'tomato mush') is a thick Tuscan bread soup typically prepared with fresh tomatoes, bread, olive oil, garlic, basil, and various other fresh ingredients. The bread is usually stale or leftover. A basic preparation of pappa al pomodoro involves lightly frying the garlic in oil, before briefly cooking it in a soup with the tomatoes, bread, and basil. The dish is sometimes served hot, and at other times at room temperature or chilled. A rule upheld as a Tuscan tradition in Italy is that cheese must not be added within or on top of the dish.

Pappa al pomodoro originated with the Tuscan tenant farmer as a way to use their meagre supply of tomatoes. Stale bread was used because it was the only type available in rural areas, where communal ovens were lit once per week to bake the week's bread supply.

The dish became known in Italy outside of Tuscany with the publication of the serial Il Giornalino di Gian Burrasca from 1907–1908. "Long live pappa al pomodoro" served as the catchphrase of the story's hero, a child named "Johnny Hurricane" in protest of the bland soups served at the boarding school he was forced to attend. Further awareness came with the story's television adaptation in the 1960s, in which Rita Pavone sang the well-known song "Viva la pappa col pomodoro".

== See also ==
- List of Italian soups
- List of tomato dishes
- List of bread dishes
