= Minestra di ceci =

Italian soup based on chickpeas

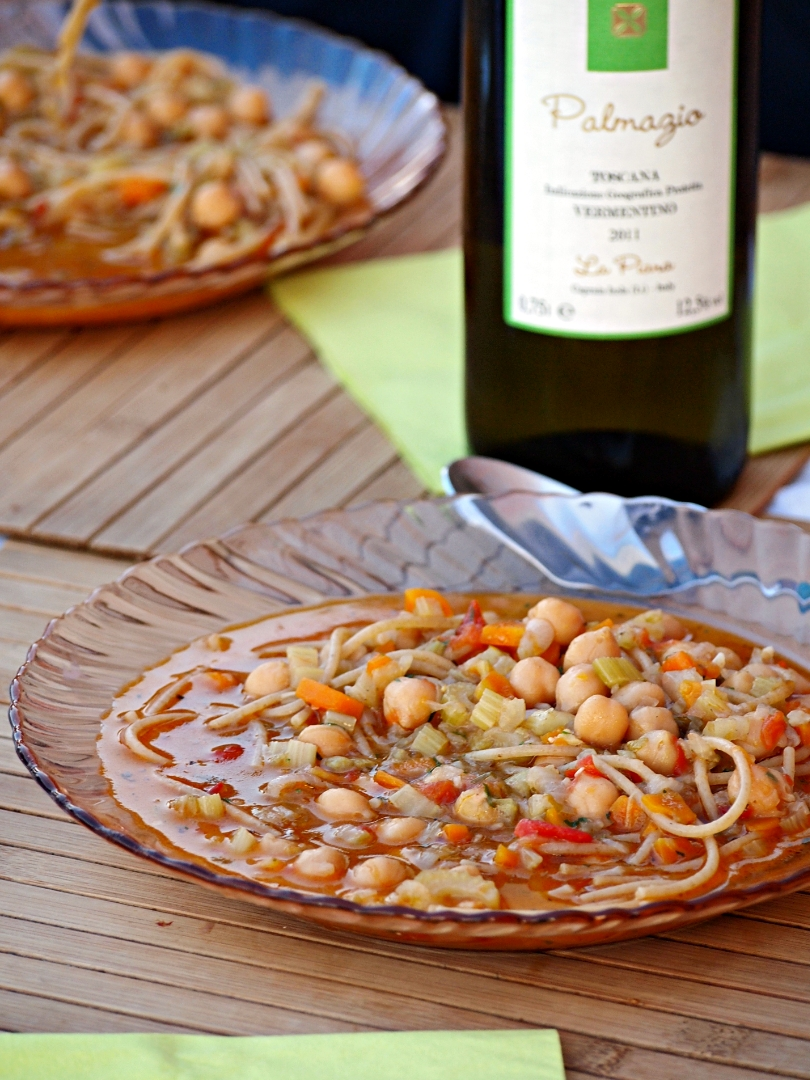
Minestra di ceci con Palmazio (lit. 'chickpea soup with Palmazio', a white wine produced with a grape variety originating from the island of Capraia)

Minestra di ceci (lit. 'chickpea soup') is an Italian soup made with chickpeas as a primary ingredient. Dried chickpeas that have been soaked or canned chickpeas may be used. Additional ingredients can vary, and may include foods such as salt cod, chestnuts, artichoke, potato, tomato, pasta and cabbage, among others. Soup base ingredients may include olive oil, garlic, onion, carrot and celery, among others.

== History ==
Minestra di ceci is a common soup in the Abruzzo region of Italy, and has been described as a winter soup.

== See also ==
- List of Italian soups
