= Sciusceddu =

Italian soup

Sciusceddu (Sicilian: [çʊçˈçɛɖɖʊ]) is a Sicilian soup prepared using meatballs and broken eggs as primary ingredients, served as a traditional Easter dish in the city of Messina. Additional ingredients used include broth, caciocavallo and ricotta cheeses, parsley, salt and pepper. It can be prepared in a similar style to egg drop soup.

== Etymology ==
Juscellum, the Latin word upon which the Sicilian name is based, (Note: "In sciusceddu, a soup with meatballs and broken eggs, we learn that the Sicilian name of this dish has its roots in Latin, juscellum.") was a dish in ancient Roman cuisine which was included in Apicius, a Roman recipe book that is believed to have been written in the late 4th or early 5th century.

== See also ==
- List of Italian soups
