= Jusselle =

Ancient Roman broth-based soup

Jusselle is an ancient broth-based soup dish prepared using grated bread, eggs, sage, and saffron. The ingredients were all boiled together in the broth.

The dish is believed to have originated from the dish juscellum in ancient Roman cuisine, which was included in Apicius, a Roman recipe book that is believed to have been written in the late 4th or early 5th century. In Latin, juscellum or juscullum is "a diminutive from jus, broth or pottage", and is also a late Latin diminutive word for 'soup'. The Sicilian name for the dish sciusceddu is based upon the word juscellum. (Note: "In sciusceddu, a soup with meatballs and broken eggs, we learn that the Sicilian name of this dish has its roots in Latin, juscellum.")

== See also ==
- List of soups
- Ancient Roman cuisine
