= Garmugia =

Italian soup

Garmugia, also referred to as gramugia, is an Italian soup originally from the town of Lucca, Tuscany. The soup's use in the cuisine of Lucca dates back to the 17th century. Garmugia has been described as "a hearty soup" that is "unknown outside of the province".

== Ingredients ==
Primary ingredients include chicken or vegetable stock or broth, asparagus, artichoke hearts, fava beans, peas, onion and meats, such as pancetta and veal. Carrot, celery and beet leaves may also be used. The pancetta and veal may be used in relatively small portions, to add flavor to the soup. Some versions may be prepared using lean ground beef, beefsteak or sausage, and some may include cheese such as Parmesan or pecorino. Seasonings may include salt and pepper. It may be served poured atop toasted bread or croutons.

== Preparation ==
Garmugia may be prepared seasonally, when its primary vegetable ingredients are harvested in the spring. The soup may be cooked in an earthenware vessel. Total cooking times can vary between approximately 30 minutes to over 2 hours.

== See also ==
- List of Italian soups
