= Maccu =

Sicilian soup

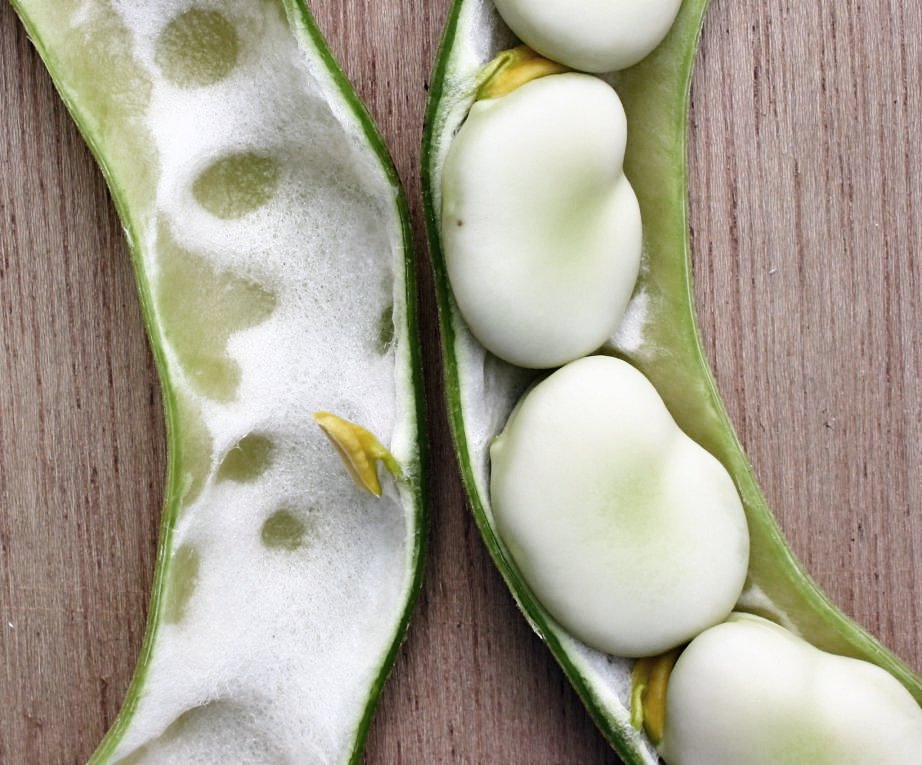
Fava beans (here fresh and in the pod, rather than dried) are a primary ingredient of maccu.

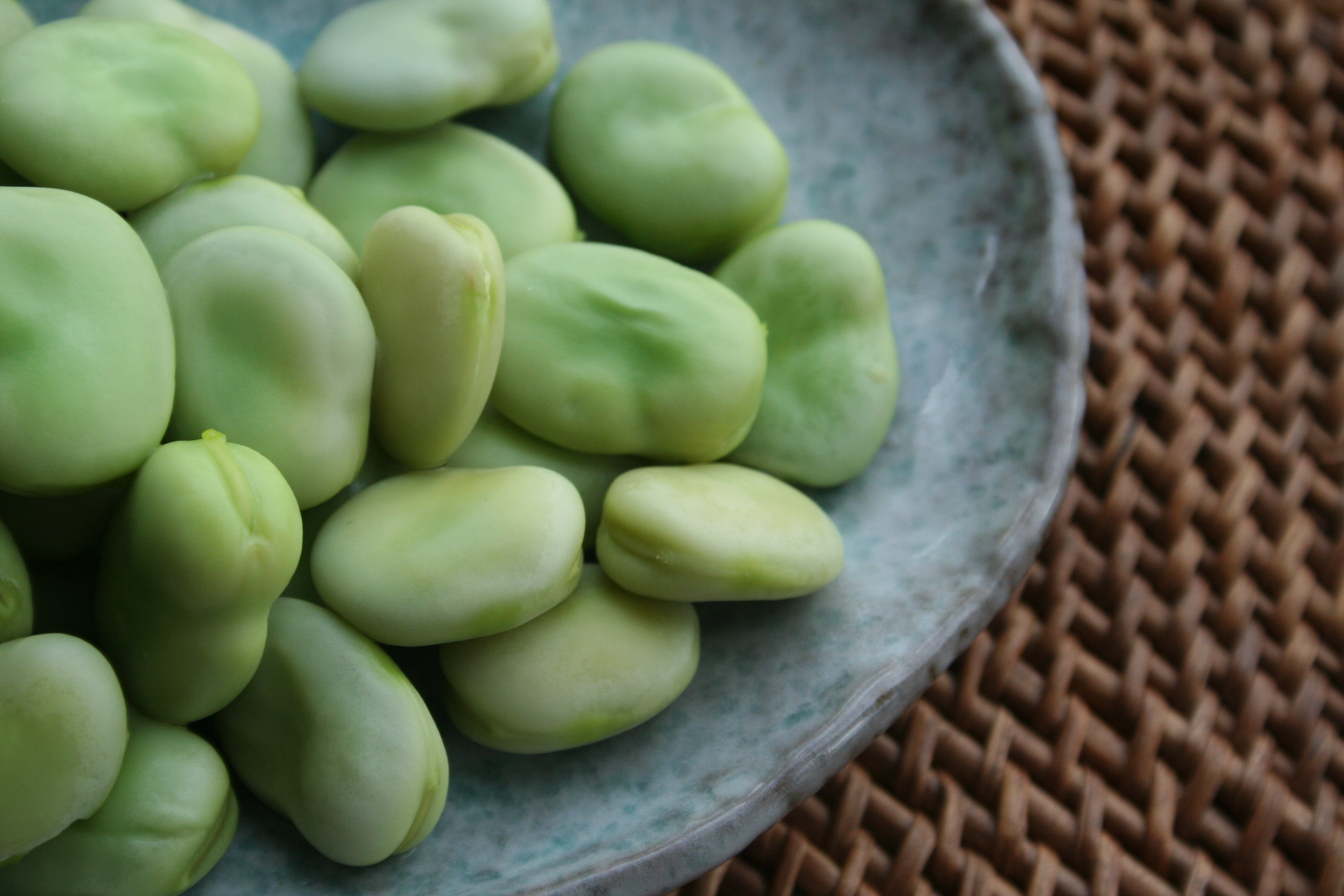
Fresh fava beans, shelled and steamed

Maccu (also known as maccu di fave and sometimes referred to as macco) is a Sicilian soup with a dense texture and also a foodstuff that is prepared with dried and crushed fava beans (broad beans) and wild fennel as primary ingredients. Several dishes exist using maccu as an ingredient, such as bruschetta al maccù and maccu di San Giuseppe, the latter of which may be served on Saint Joseph's Day in Sicily.

== History ==
Maccu is a peasant food and staple food that dates back to ancient history. The ancient Roman people may have invented or introduced the foodstuff, which was created from crushed fava beans.

The name came from the Latin verbs "maccare" that means to crush. The beans are crushed slightly during cooking. Although maccu's availability in contemporary times in Sicily is generally rare, it is still occasionally served in restaurants and hosterias there.

== Ingredients and preparation ==
Primary ingredients include fava beans, fennel seeds and sprigs, olive oil, salt and pepper. Additional ingredients may include tomato, onion and pasta. The soup is sometimes cooled until it solidifies, then cut into strips, breaded in flour and fried in olive oil. Some preparations of maccu may use fava beans that have been puréed.

== Dishes that use maccu ==
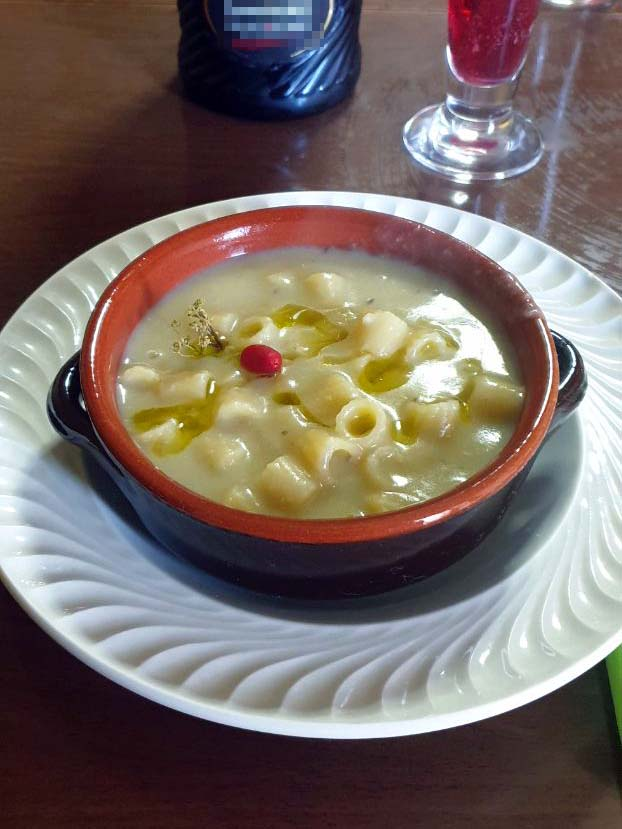
Pasta cco maccu, a typical Sicilian dish

Bruschetta al maccú is a simple dish prepared with bruschetta and maccu that may be served as an appetizer or lunch dish.

Maccu di San Giuseppe (lit. 'maccu of St. Joseph') is a traditional Sicilian dish that consists of various ingredients and maccu. The dish may be prepared on Saint Joseph's Day in Sicily, to clear out pantries and allow room for the spring's new crops of vegetables. In Sicily, St. Joseph is regarded by many as their patron saint, and in many Italian American communities, thanks are given to St. Joseph (San Giuseppe in Italian) for preventing a famine in Sicily during the Middle Ages. According to legend, there was a severe drought at the time, and the people prayed for their patron saint to bring them rain. They promised that if he answered their prayers, they would prepare a large feast to honor him. The rain did come, and the people of Sicily prepared a large banquet for their patron saint. The fava bean was the crop which saved the population from starvation and is a traditional part of St. Joseph's Day altars and traditions. Giving food to the needy is a St. Joseph's Day custom.

Rigatoncini con maccu di fave is a Sicilian dish prepared with rigatoncini pasta (a smaller version of rigatoni) and fava bean paste.

== See also ==
- List of Italian soups
