= Italian meal structure =

Pattern of meals in Italy

Italian meal structure is typical of the European Mediterranean region and differs from that of Northern, Central, and Eastern Europe, although it still often consists of breakfast (colazione), lunch (pranzo), and supper (cena). However, breakfast itself is often skipped or is lighter than that of non-Mediterranean Europe. Late-morning and mid-afternoon snacks, called merenda (pl.: merende), are also often eaten.

Full meals in Italy contain four or five courses. Especially on weekends, meals are often seen as a time to spend with family and friends rather than simply for sustenance; thus, meals tend to be longer than elsewhere. During holidays such as Christmas and New Year's Eve, feasts can last for hours.

Today, full-course meals are mainly reserved for special events such as weddings, while everyday meals include only a first or second course (sometimes both), a side dish, and coffee. The primo (first course) is usually a filling dish such as risotto or pasta, with sauces made from meat, vegetables or seafood. Whole pieces of meat such as sausages, meatballs, and poultry are eaten in the secondo (second course). Italian cuisine has some single-course meals (piatto unico) combining starches and proteins.

Most regions in Italy serve bread at the table, placing it in either a basket or directly on the table to be eaten alongside both the first and second courses. Bread is consumed alongside the other food, and is often used at the end of the meal to wipe the remaining sauce or broth from the dish. The expression fare la scarpetta is used to encourage a diner to use the bread to absorb the remaining food on the plate.

== Daytime meal structure ==
=== Breakfast (colazione) ===
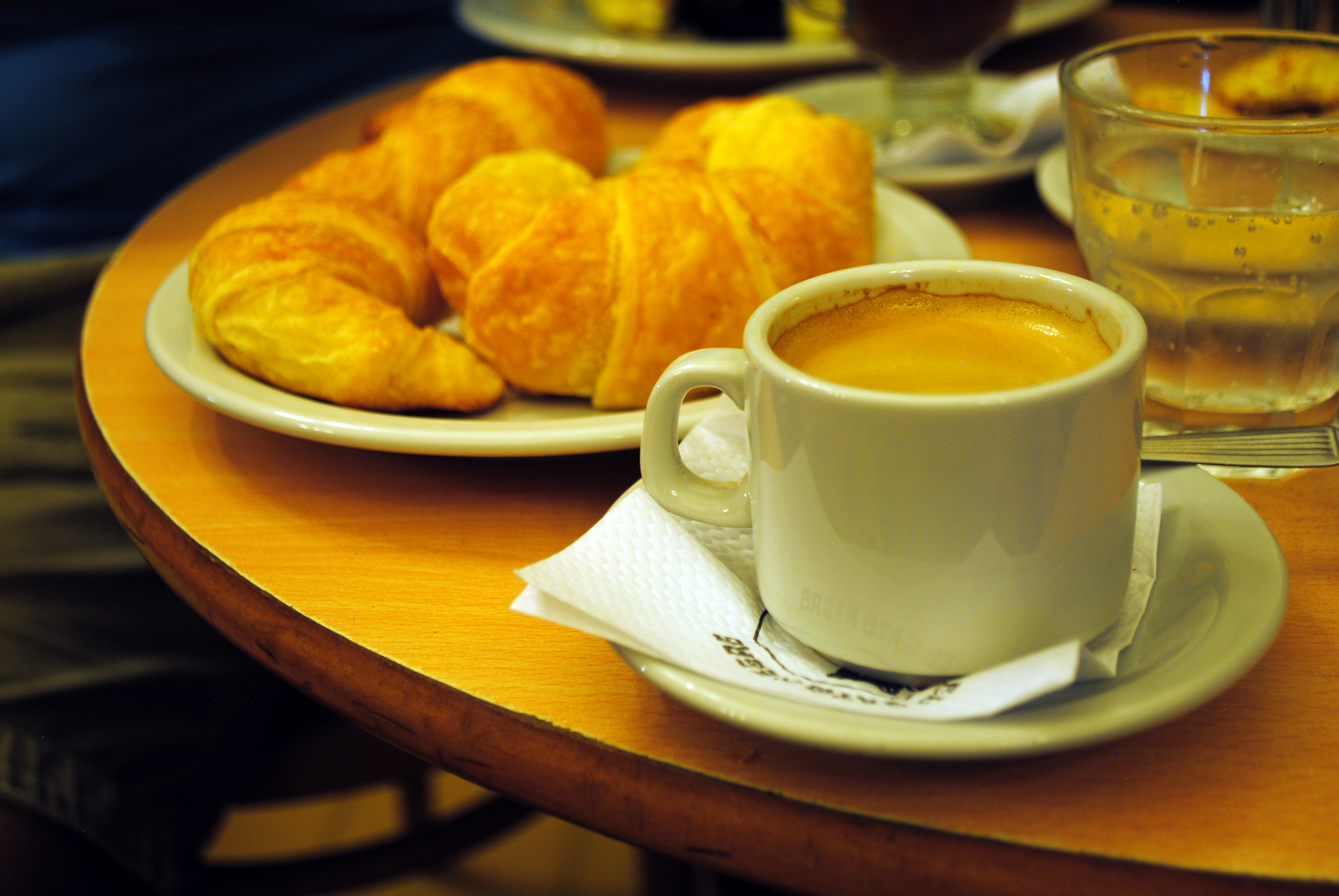
A cup of cappuccino and cornetti at breakfast (colazione)

The most popular breakfast (colazione) is sweet, consumed at home or at a café. If breakfast is consumed at home, it consists of coffee, milk or caffè latte accompanied by baked goods such as biscuits, for example shortbread, or by slices of bread spread with butter and jam or with honey or gianduja cream, made with chocolate and hazelnuts. Milk is sometimes replaced by fruit juice. On some special occasions, such as Sundays or holidays, there may also be more baked goods, such as cakes, pies, pastries, or other regional specialties.

If breakfast is consumed at a café, espresso coffee predominates, together with cappuccino or latte macchiato, accompanied by a cornetto, bombolone, or other pastry; however, the choice of breakfast desserts is varied, some of which are often present only in certain regions or cities. In recent decades, other types of coffee drinks have also spread, such as mocaccino and marocchino.

Much less frequent, but not completely unusual, is the savory breakfast (although much lighter and frugal than other European savory breakfasts), often consisting of focaccia (of different types and depending on the region) or even just toasted homemade bread topped with olive oil, tomato or sliced salami.

However, many Italians only drink coffee for breakfast and no food.

=== Lunch (pranzo) ===
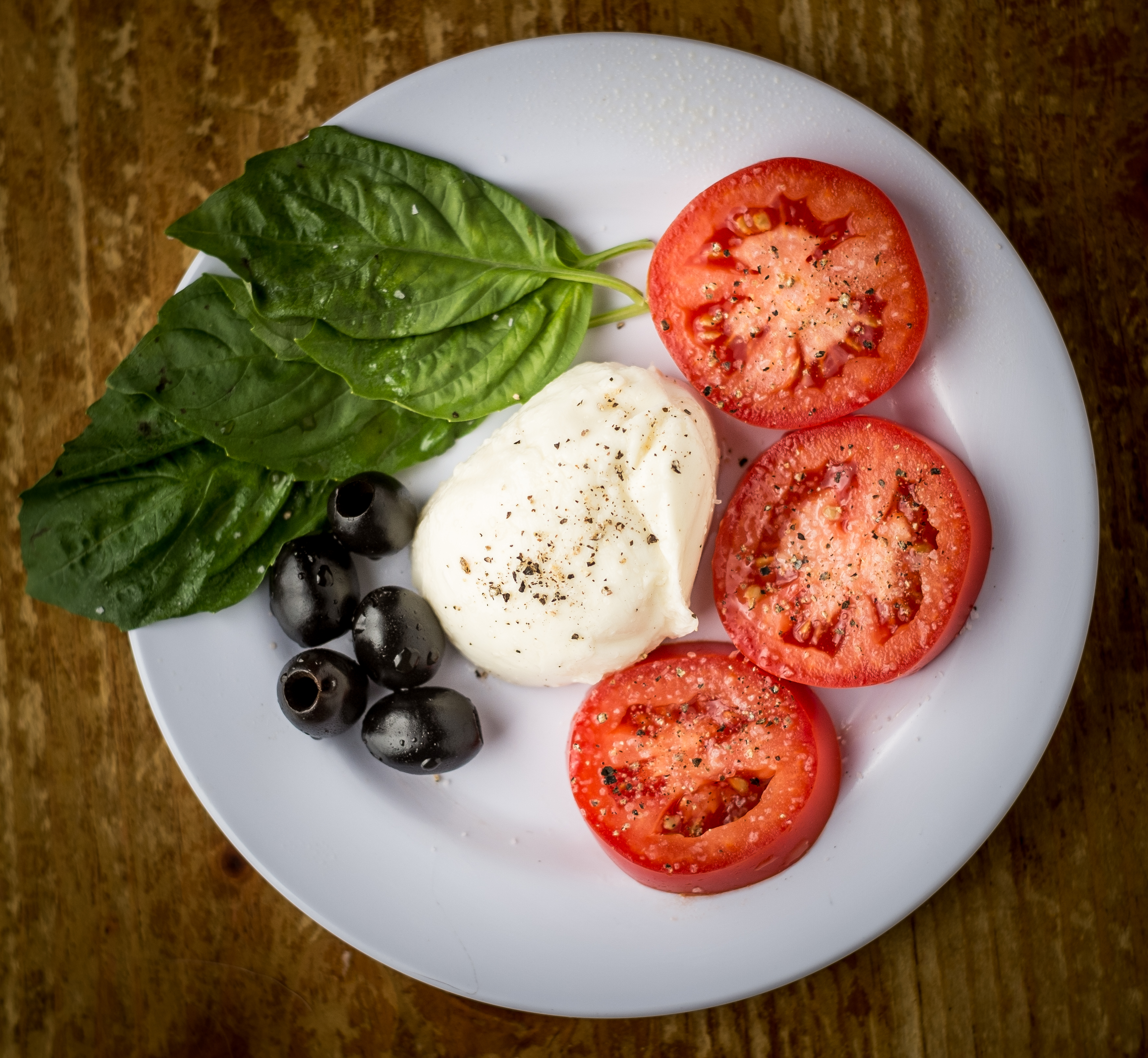
An insalata caprese, a cold dish which might be consumed at a lunch in Italy during the hot summer

Lunch (pranzo) is generally considered the most important meal of the day. The full version is composed of four courses:

- a first course (primo), usually a dish based on pasta, rice, polenta, legumes or soup;
- a second course (secondo), based on meat, fish, dairy products such as cheese or eggs;
- a side dish (contorno) of raw or cooked vegetables, which accompanies the second dish;
- seasonal fresh fruit (frutta) as dessert.

Lunch is always served with bread.

Meals, particularly lunch, are generally concluded with a cup of espresso, sometimes followed by the so-called ammazzacaffè, consisting of a glass of local liqueur, bitter or sweet (of which there is wide choice).

On special occasions, such as holidays and anniversaries, there are also two other courses:

- an appetizer (antipasto); cold or hot, it is the least abundant course, and is generally composed of crostini, bruschetta, salami and/or sausages, cheeses and/or dairy products, cooked and/or raw vegetables or preparations based on seafood;
- a dessert (dolce) to finish;

Wine is often a part of the meal, especially during lunch and dinner.

=== Mid-afternoon snack (merenda) ===
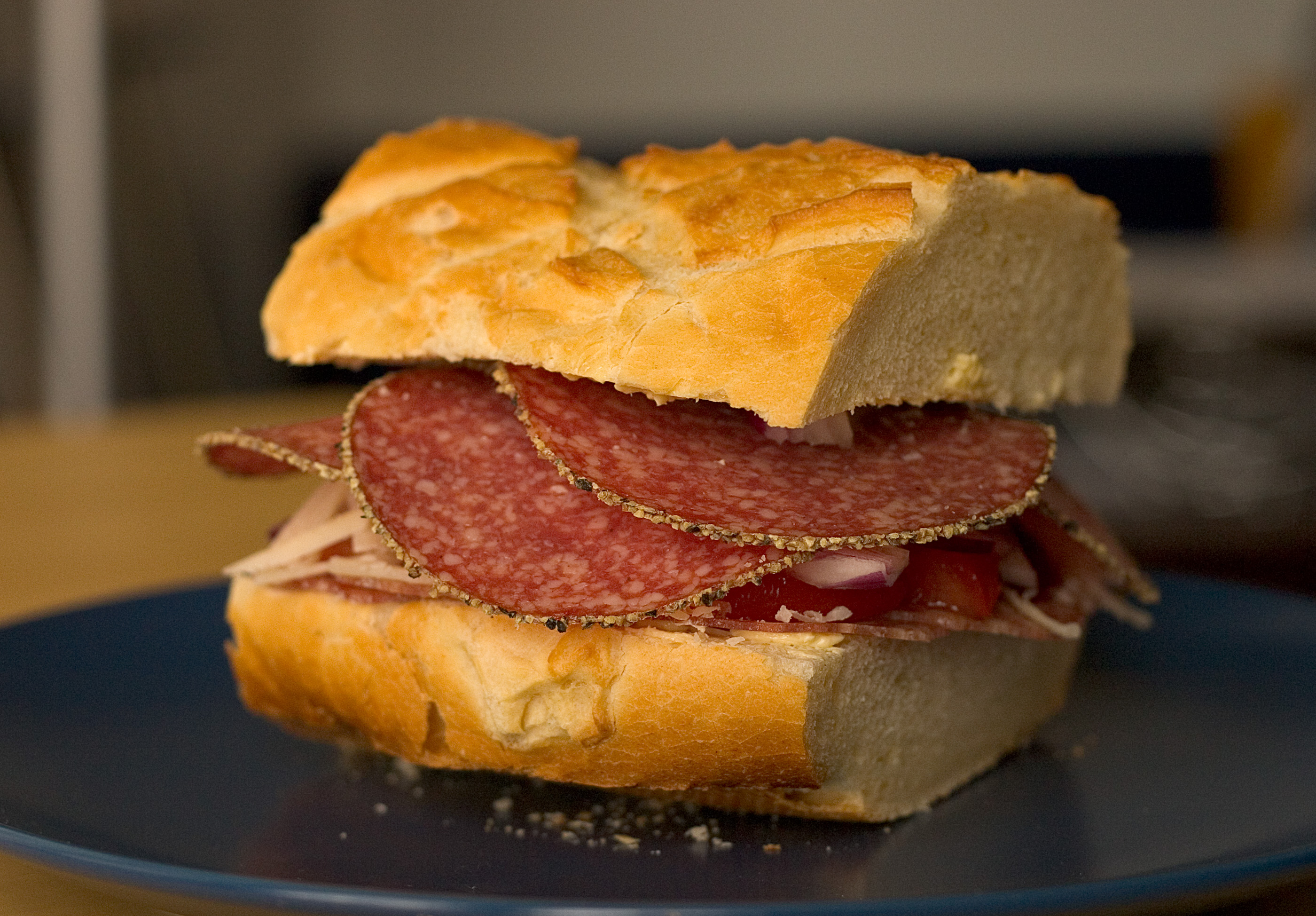
A classic panino with salami for the merenda

A merenda (from the Latin merenda) is a snack in the mid-morning (around 10 a.m.) or mid-afternoon (around 5 p.m.). It is usually a light meal, consisting of panini or tramezzini, fruit alone or bread and jam, if not a dessert and, in summer, possibly gelato. It is common for children, and also eaten by adults.

=== Supper (cena) ===
Supper is the other main meal of the day. It has the same courses as lunch, but with dishes and foods that are usually lighter.

Exceptions are richer dinners (cenoni) eaten for festivities such as New Year's Eve, Christmas Eve and the Carnival period.

Unlike lunch, supper, when consumed among close family members, does not necessarily include a first course based on starchy foods (such as pasta or polenta) or cereals (such as rice), so sometimes supper consists of the equivalent of a second course (a meat or fish-based preparation), with or without a side dish, or a single dish, such as a soup, and including bread.

== Formal meal structure ==
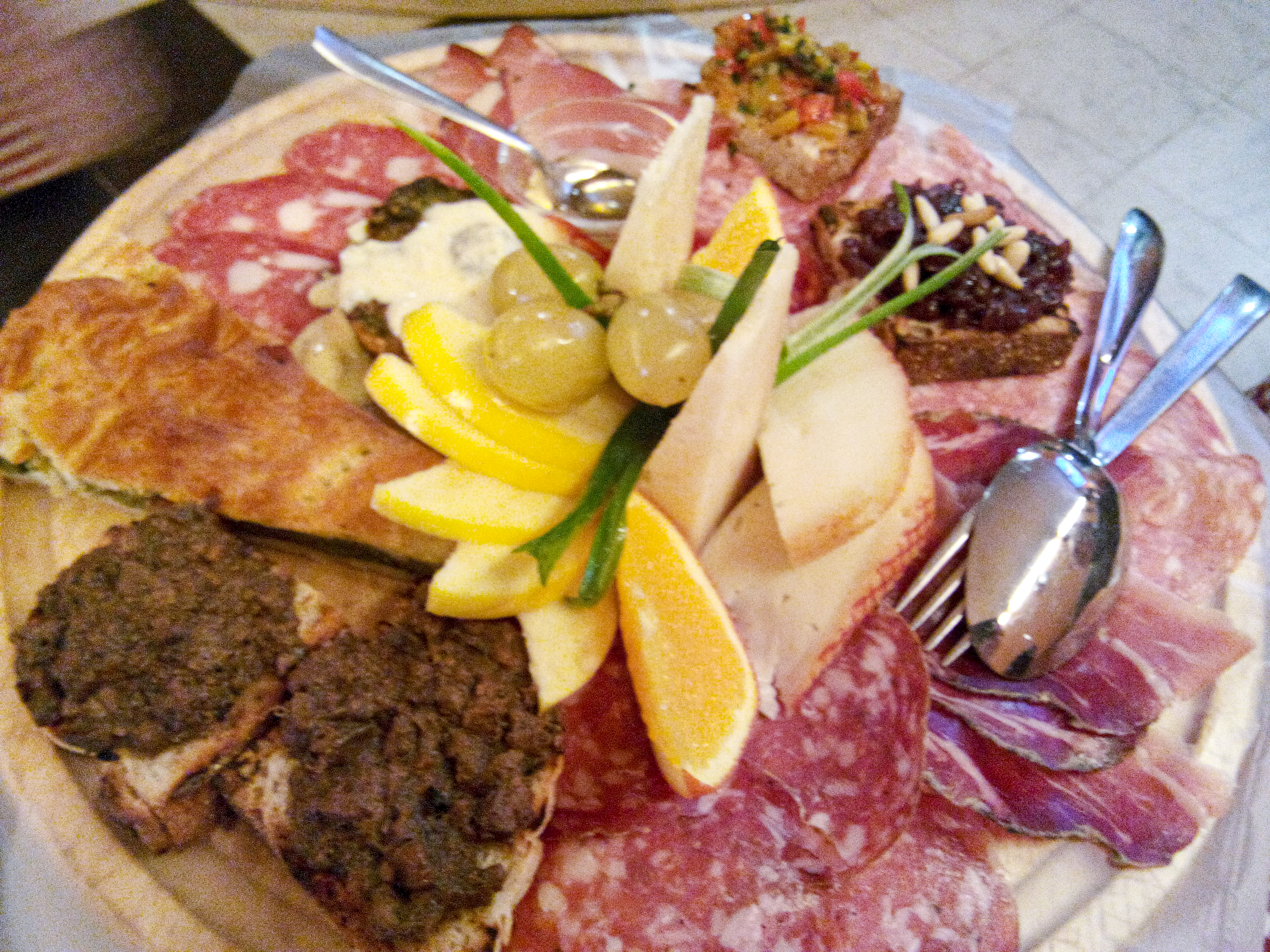
An Italian-style antipasto

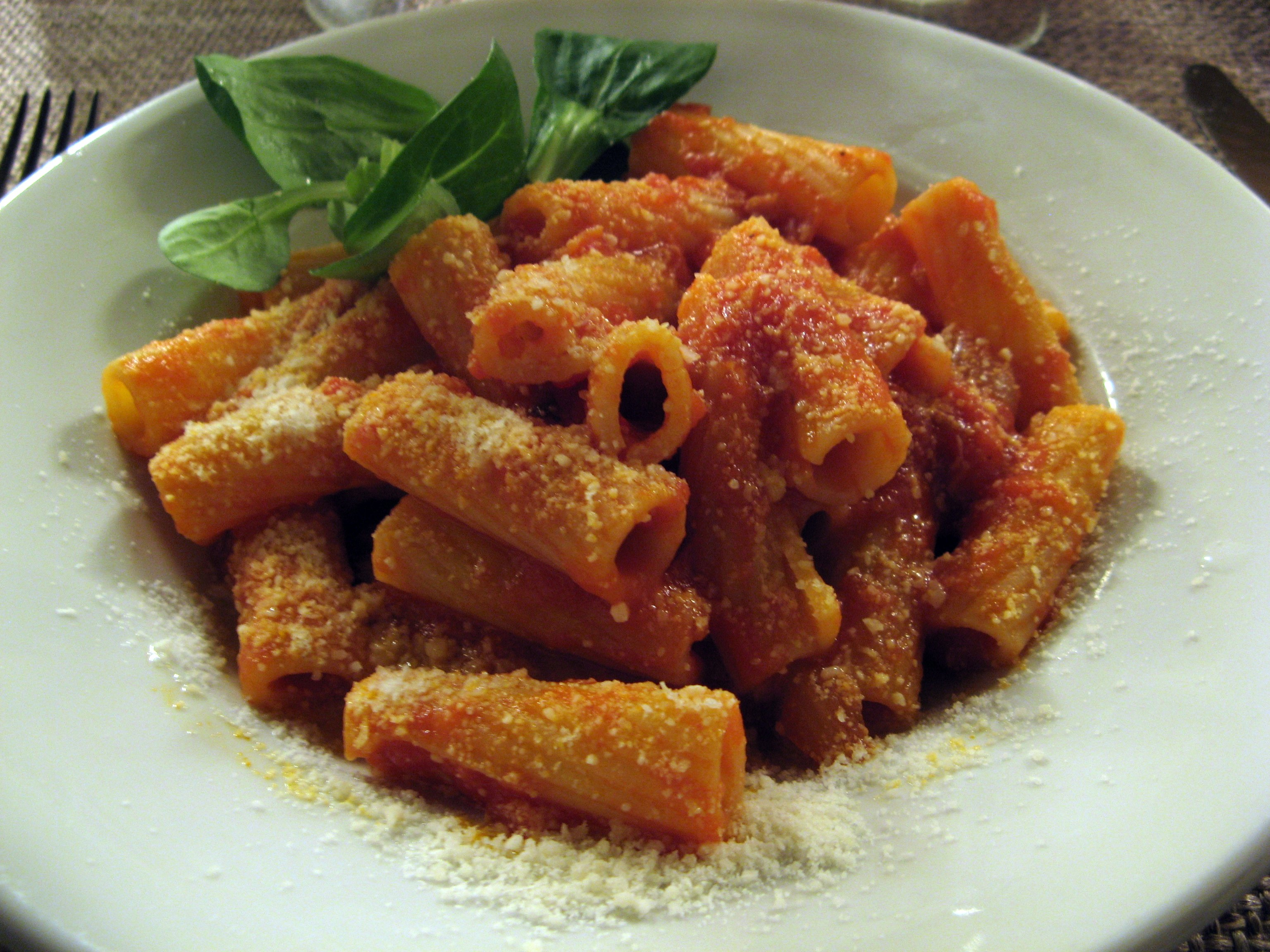
Maccheroni all'amatriciana. Pasta is the archetypal primo.

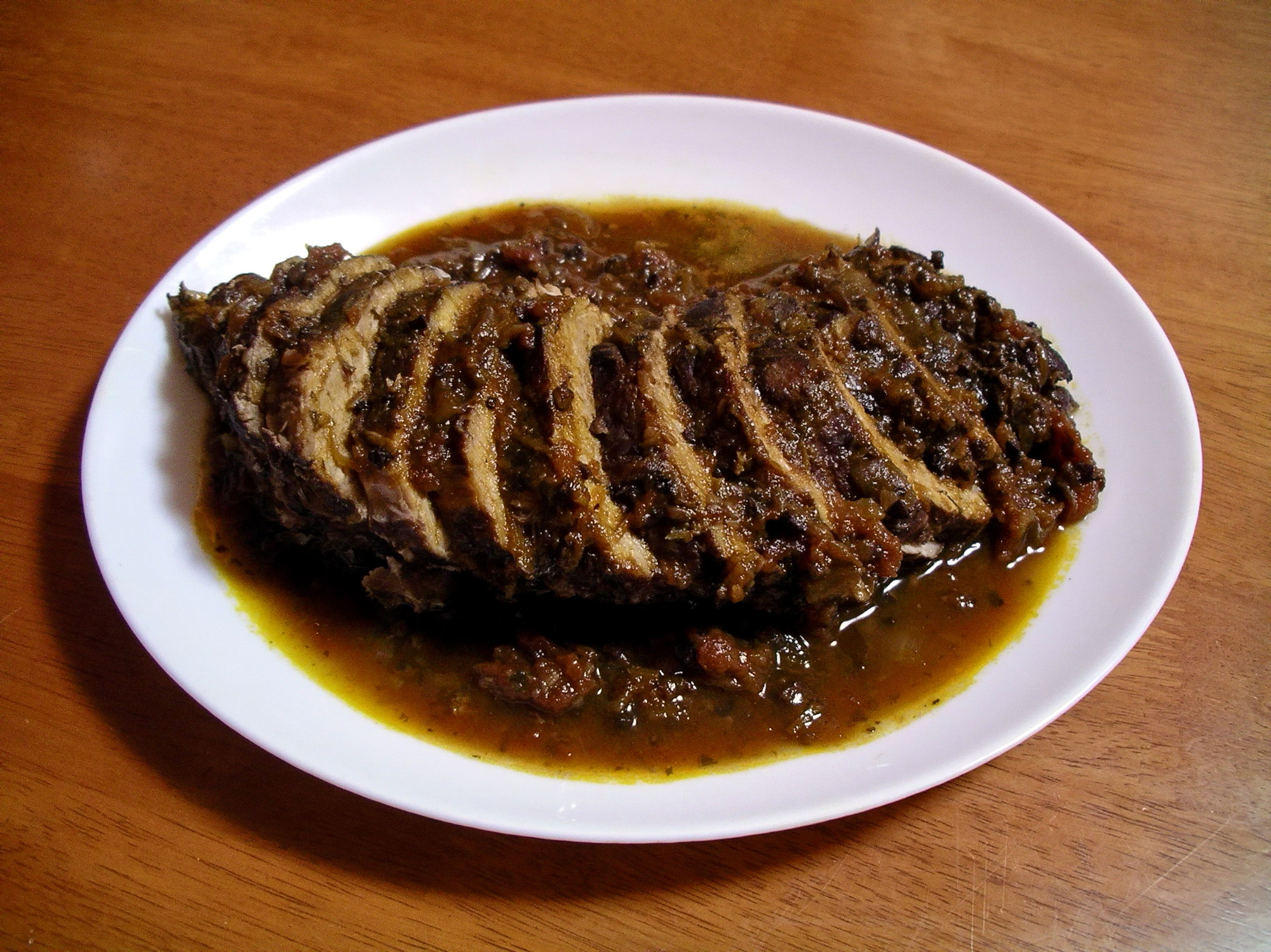
A Lombard brasato di maiale is considered a second course.

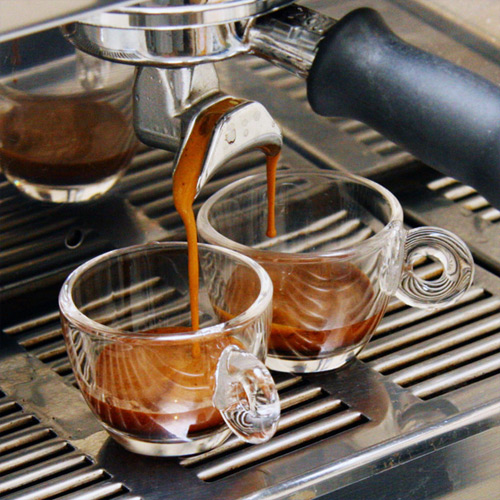
Cups of espresso typically consumed after a meal

A structure of an Italian meal in its full form, usually used during festivities:

Aperitivo
The aperitivo opens a meal, and it is similar to an appetizer. Most people gather around standing up and have alcoholic/non-alcoholic drinks such as wine, prosecco, spritz, vermouth, and gingerino. Occasionally small amounts of food are consumed, such as olives, crisps, nuts, cheese, sauce dips, little quiches or similar snacks.

Antipasto
The antipasto is a slightly heavier starter. It is usually cold and lighter than the first course. Examples of foods eaten are salumi (such as salami, mortadella, prosciutto, bresaola, and other charcuterie products), cheeses, sandwich-like foods (panino and tramezzino), marinated vegetables or fish, cold salmon or prawn cocktails; more elaborate dishes are occasionally prepared.

Primo
The first course. It consists of hot food and is usually heavier than the antipasto, but lighter than the second course. Non-meat dishes are the staple of any primo piatto: examples are risotto, pasta, seafood or vegetarian sauces, soup and broth, gnocchi, polenta, crespelle, casseroles or lasagne.

Secondo
This course may include different meats and types of fish, including turkey, sausage, pork, steak, stew, beef, zampone, salt cod, stockfish, salmon, lobster, lamb or chicken. The primo or the secondo piatto may be considered more important depending on the locality and the situation.

Contorno
A side dish commonly served alongside a secondo piatto. These usually consist of vegetables, raw or cooked, hot or cold. They are usually served on a separate dish, not on the same plate as the meat as in Northern European style of presentation.

Insalata
If the contorno contained many leafy vegetables, the salad might be omitted. Otherwise, a fresh garden salad could be served at this point.

Formaggi e frutta
An entire course is dedicated to local cheeses and fresh seasonal fruit. The cheeses will be whatever is typical of the region (see List of Italian cheeses).

Dolce
Next follows the dolce, or dessert. Frequent dishes include tiramisu, panna cotta, cake or pie, panettone or pandoro (the last two are mainly served at Christmas time) and the colomba pasquale (an Easter cake). A gelato or a sorbetto can be eaten too. Although there are nationwide desserts, popular across Italy, many regions and cities have local specialties. In Naples, for instance, zeppole and rum baba are popular; in Sicily, cassata and cannoli are commonly consumed; mostarda, on the other hand, is more of a northern dish.

Caffè
Coffee is often drunk at the end of a meal, even after the digestivo. Italians do not have milky coffees or drinks after meals (such as cappuccino or caffè macchiato), but strong coffee such as espresso, which is often drunk very quickly in small cups while still hot. Short drinks, grappa in particular, may go with the caffè, either in a separate glass or mixed in (caffè corretto).

Digestivo
The digestivo, also called ammazzacaffè if served after the coffee, is the drink to conclude the meal. Drinks such as grappa, amaro, limoncello or other fruit/herbal drinks are drunk. Digestivo indicates that the drinks served at this time are meant to ease digestion of a long meal. Even if the caffè went with grappa, a sweeter digestivo may follow.

== See also ==
- Italian cuisine
- List of Italian foods and drinks
- Full-course dinner
