= Zuppa alla modenese =

Italian soup

- Type: Soup
- Course: Primo (Italian course)
- Place of origin: Italy
- Region or state: Modena, Emilia-Romagna
- Main ingredients: Stock, spinach, butter, salt, eggs, Parmesan cheese, nutmeg, croutons

Zuppa alla modenese is an Italian soup.

== See also ==
Zuppa alla Modenese at the Wikibooks Cookbook subproject

- List of Italian soups
