= Panuozzo =

Italian sandwich from Campania made of pizza bread stuffed with meat and vegetables

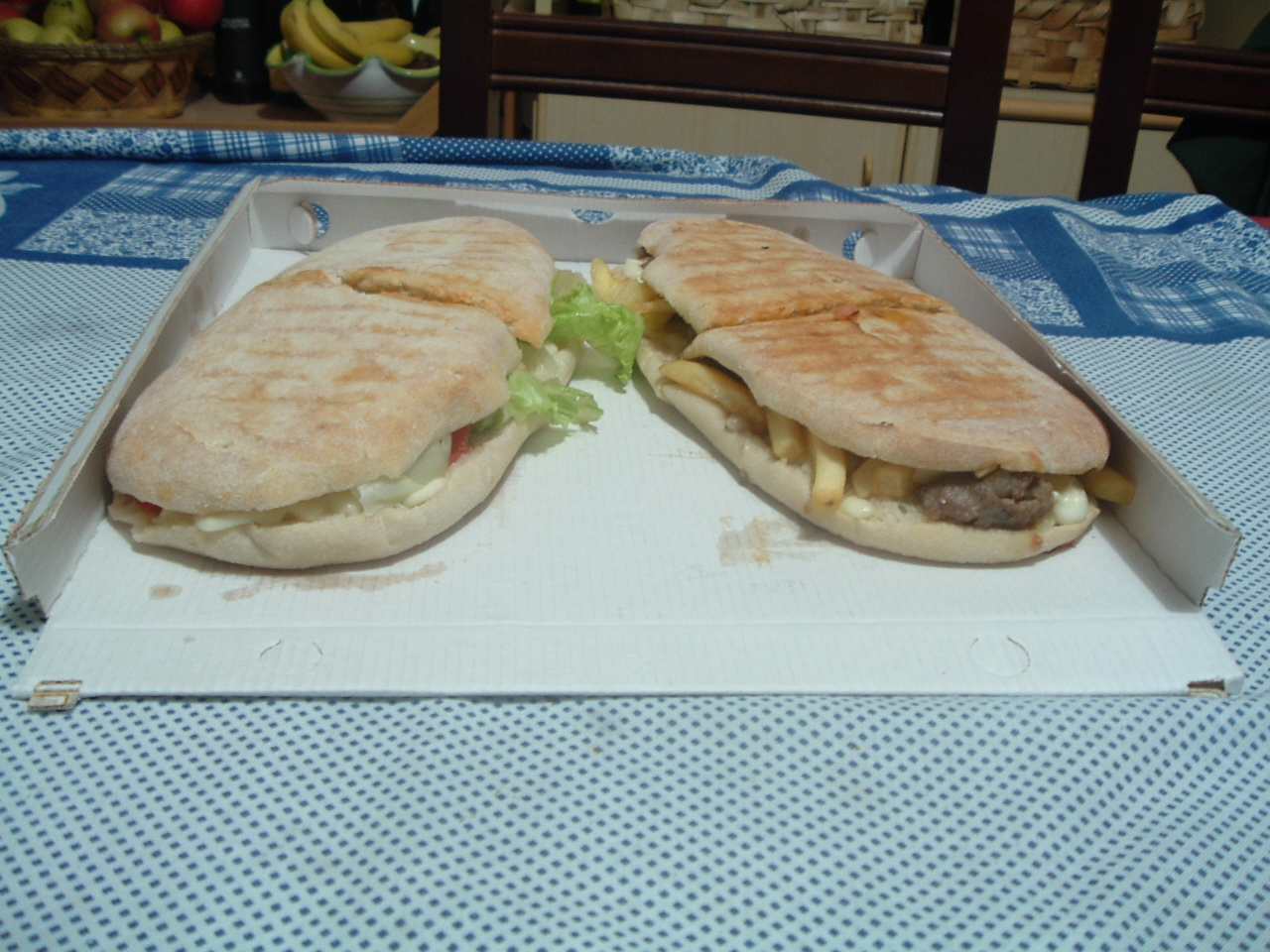
- A couple of panuozzi
- Place of origin: Italy
- Region or state: Campania
- Created by: Giuseppe Mascolo
- Invented: 1983
- Main ingredients: Pizza bread, various fillings with meat
- Variations: Vegetarian

Panuozzo (Italian: [paˈnwɔttso], Neapolitan: [paˈnwottsə]; Italian pl.: panuozzi, Neapolitan pl.: panuozze) is an Italian sandwich of pizza bread stuffed with fillings of meat and vegetables. It was invented in 1983 by the pizzaiolo ('pizza maker') Giuseppe Mascolo, from the comune (municipality) of Gragnano, near Naples, Italy, and was first adopted in the region of the Monti Lattari (Pimonte, Agerola, and Sant'Antonio Abate). Various fillings can be used, such as mozzarella or other dairy products, tomatoes, several vegetables (e.g., aubergine and courgette), Italian sausages and sliced meats, friggitelli, and so on.

Panuozzo is officially recognised as a prodotto agroalimentare tradizionale (PAT).

== Gallery ==
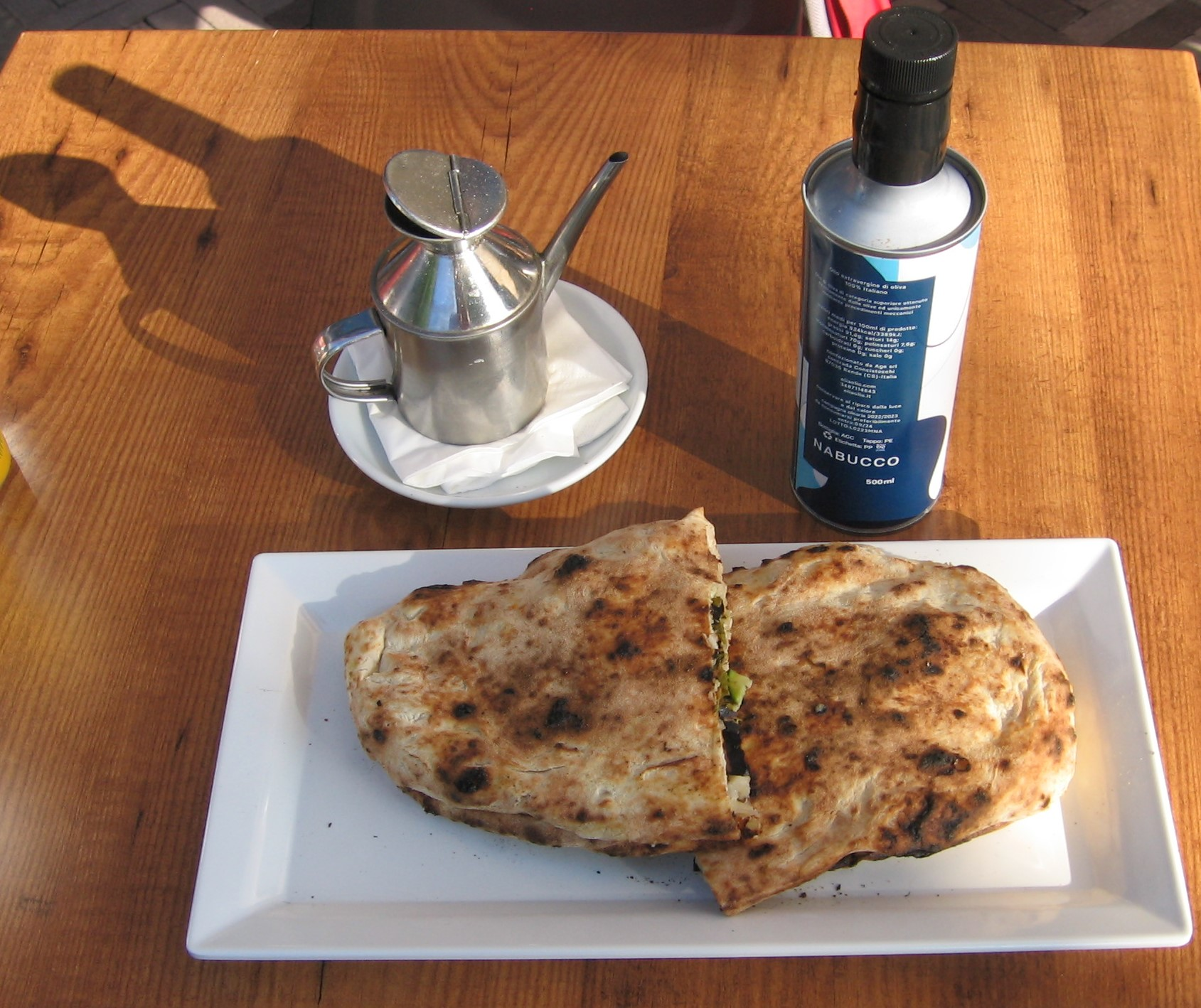
Panuozzo vegetariano (lit. 'vegetarian panuozzo'), Utrecht, 2024

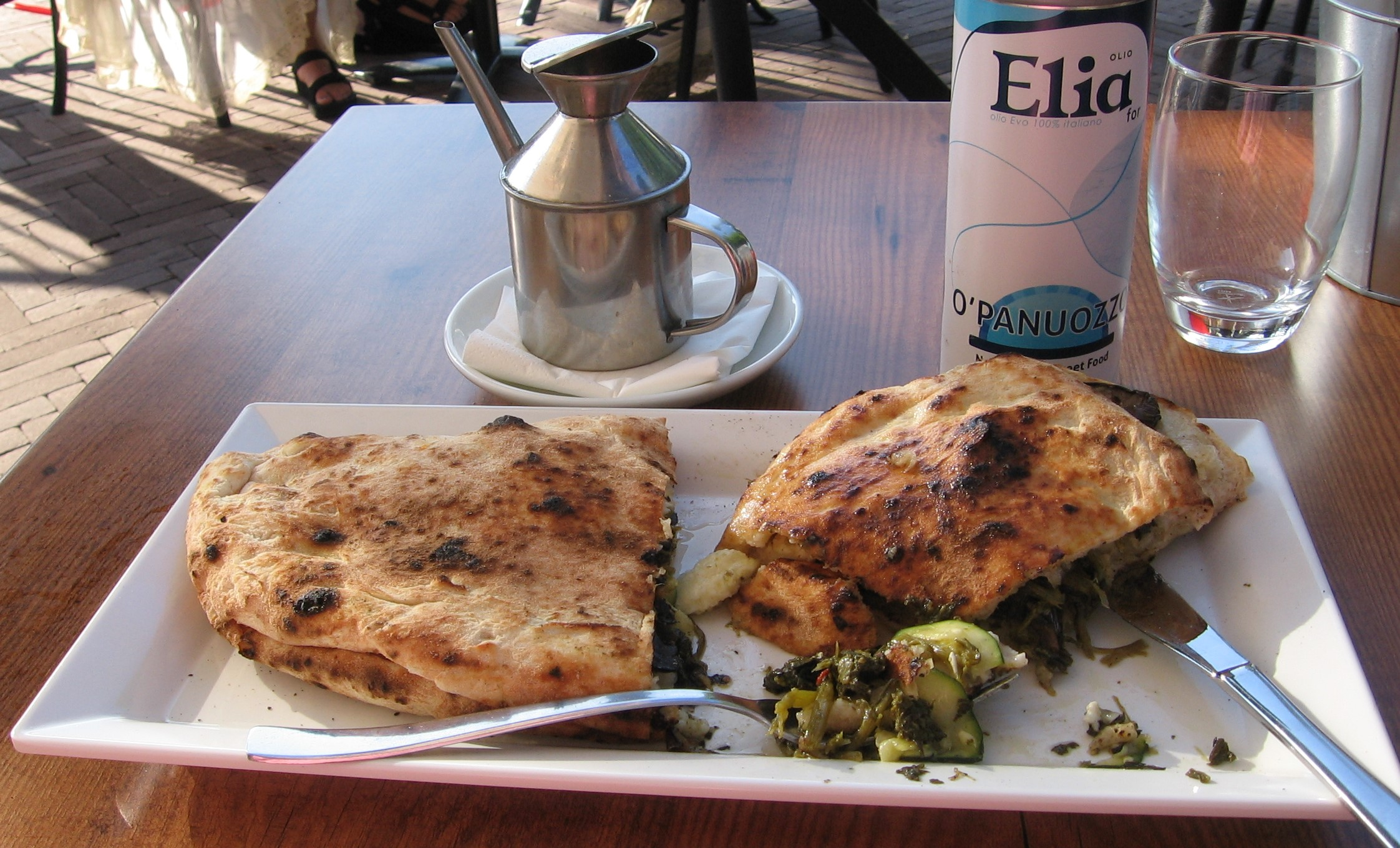
Pair of panuozzi with a forkful of fillings, Utrecht, 2024

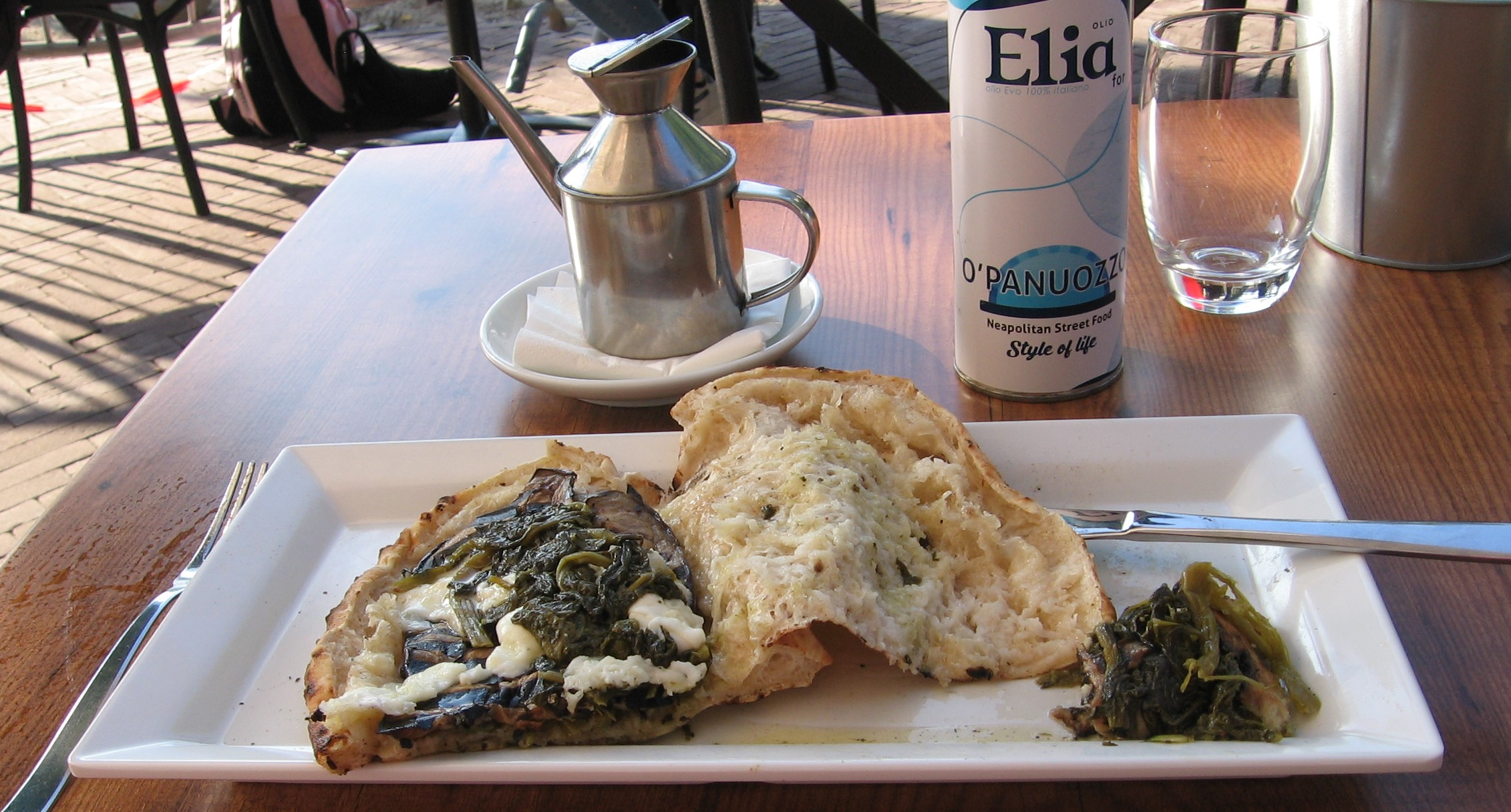
Opened panuozzo, exposing the filling of spinach with melted mozzarella, Utrecht, 2024

== See also ==
Media related to Panuozzi at Wikimedia Commons

- Panini
- Tramezzino
