= Ammazzacaffè =

Italian drink

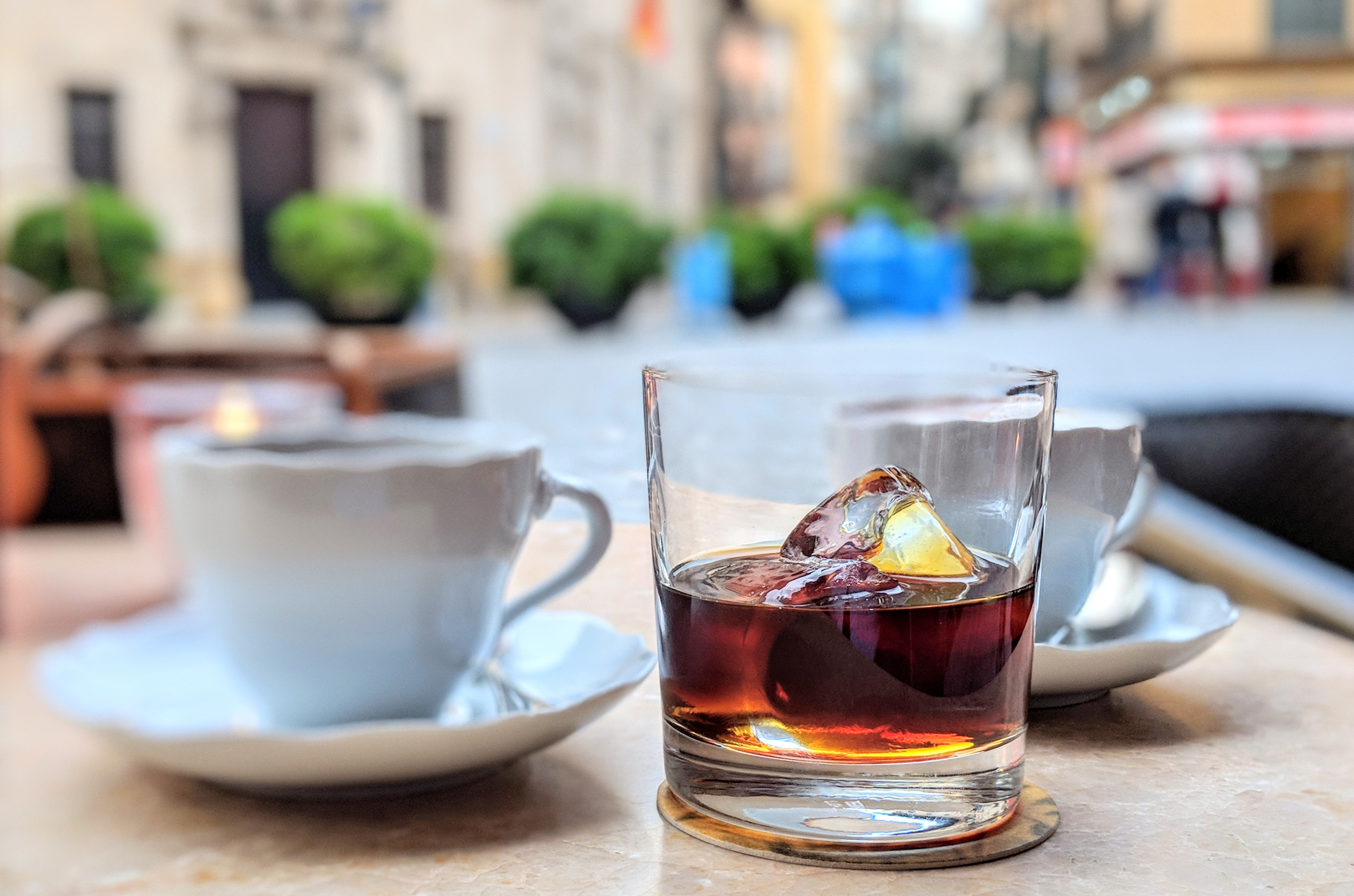
Amaro, served right after espresso

Ammazzacaffè (Italian: [amˌmattsakafˈfɛ]; lit. 'coffee-killer') is a small glass of liqueur usually consumed after coffee to dull its taste or the effects of caffeine. It is a common Italian custom, especially after a generous festive meal.
