= Bianca Modenese =

Breed of cattle

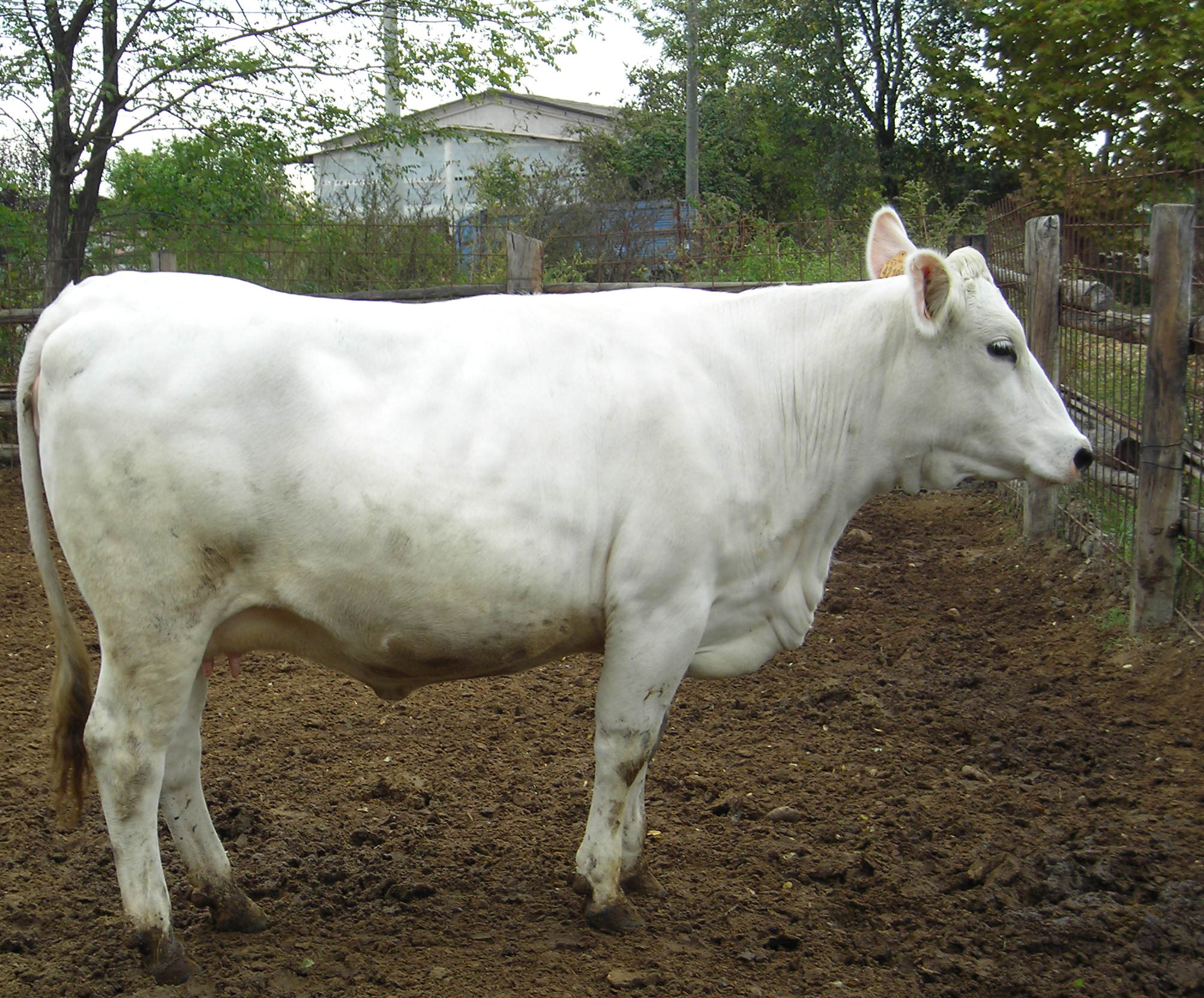
- A heifer

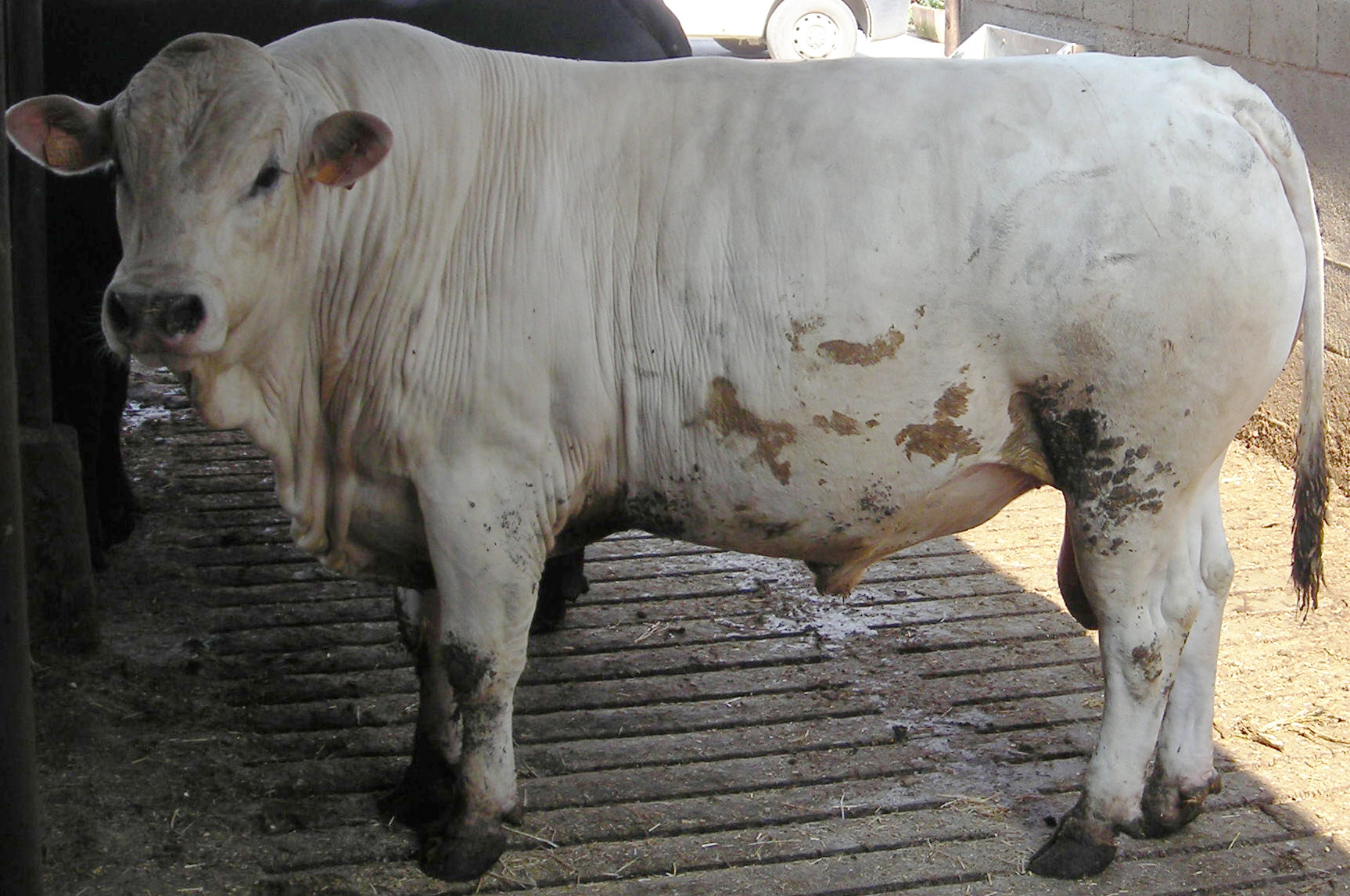
- A bull
- Conservation status: FAO (2007): endangered-maintained
- Other names: Bianca della Val Padana; Bianca Val Padana; Carpigiana; Modenese
- Country of origin: Italy
- Distribution: Province of Modena; Province of Bologna; Province of Ferrara; Province of Mantova; Province of Reggio Emilia
- Standard: MIPAAF (page 9)
- Use: originally triple-purpose; now meat and dairy

Traits
- Weight: Male: average 1050 kg; Female: average 650 kg
- Height: Male: average 155 cm; Female: average 145 cm
- Skin colour: unpigmented
- Coat: white; some grey shading in bulls
- Horn status: horns small, forward-curving
- Cattle; Bos (primigenius) taurus

The Bianca Modenese or Modenese is an Italian breed of dual-purpose cattle from the Po Valley, in the Emilia Romagna and Lombardy regions of northern Italy. It is raised for beef and milk production, but in the past was a triple-purpose breed, used also as a draught animal. The name derives from that of the province of Modena, where it is thought to have originated. In the nineteenth century it was concentrated in the area of Carpi, and was sometimes known as the Carpigiana. It was later distributed through much of the Po Valley, and thus also known as the Bianca della Val Padana.

== History ==
The origins of the Modenese are unknown. It may derive from a mixture of Reggiana and Podolica stock; in 1889 it was still of very mixed appearance. The breed is first documented in the mid-nineteenth century, and officially known as the "Modenese" from 1880. Many cattle in the area were wheaten; from the last decades of the nineteenth century farmers recognised that white-coated animals yielded better-quality meat, and began to breed selectively for white colouring.

The range and numbers of the Modenese expanded rapidly, particularly between 1927 and 1940. A breed standard was officially approved by the Italian ministry of agriculture in 1935, and the breed was renamed "Bianca Val Padana" to reflect its much greater area of distribution. In the early twentieth century there were 52000 head registered; the total population was probably about 200000. A census in 1944 recorded 140000, and a further 100000 under the name Carpigiana. Numbers began to decline after the Second World War: in 1955 the population was again estimated at 200000, and the Modenese constituted about 52% of the cattle raised in the province of Modena; by 1968 this had fallen to 26%. A herd book was instituted in April 1957. By 2005 about 800 head remained, of which 258, including 11 bulls, were registered in the herd book. The Modenese was listed as "endangered-maintained" by the FAO in 1995, in 2000, and in 2007. In 2012 a total number of 1022 was reported.

The Modenese is one of the sixteen minor Italian cattle breeds of limited diffusion recognised and protected by the Ministero delle Politiche Agricole Alimentari e Forestali, the Italian ministry of agriculture.

== Characteristics ==
The Modenese is white-coated; bulls may show some of the grey shading on the neck and shoulders typical of grey cattle. Bulls stand about 155 cm at the shoulder and weigh about 1050 kg; cows stand 145 cm and weigh 650 kg. They occasionally exhibit double muscling.

== Use ==
The Modenese is raised both for milk and for beef; in the past it was a triple-purpose breed, used also as a draught animal..

Milk production is about 4700 kg in a lactation of 305 days, with 3.3% fat and 3.4% protein. The milk is suitable for cheese-making and in the past was much used in the production of Parmigiano Reggiano. In the twenty-first century, some Parmigiano Reggiano is produced using only the milk of the Bianca Modenese.

Because of long selection for draught use, the cattle are willing and docile in nature, and may be used for draught work for tourism or for educational purposes.
