= Panini (sandwich) =

Italian-style sandwich

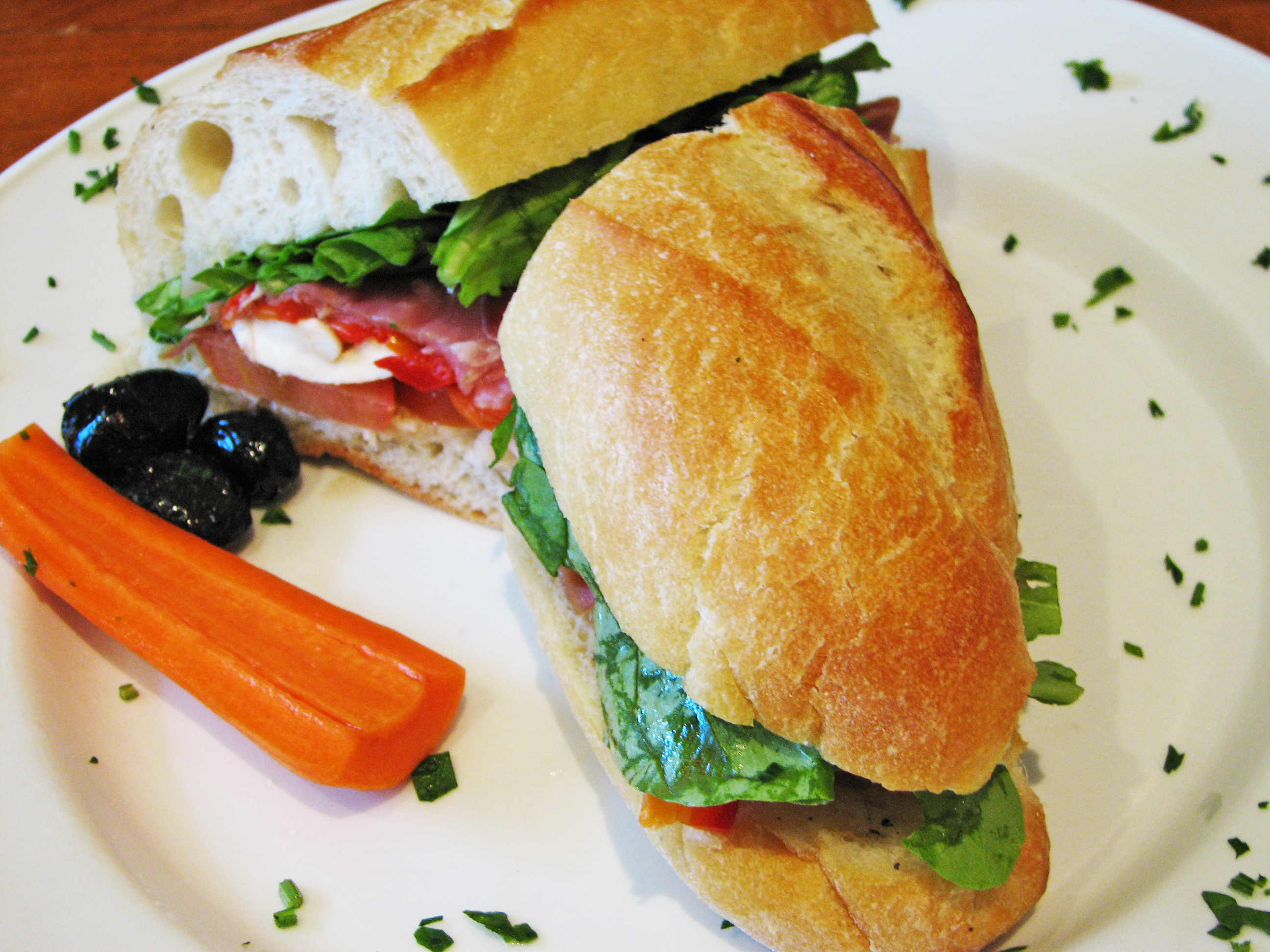
- Panino imbottito
- Alternative names: Panino (Italian singular form), panino imbottito or panino ripieno (lit. 'stuffed panino')
- Type: Sandwich
- Place of origin: Italy
- Serving temperature: Warm or room temperature
- Main ingredients: Italian bread (not sliced bread), filling (salumi, cotoletta, cheese, vegetables)

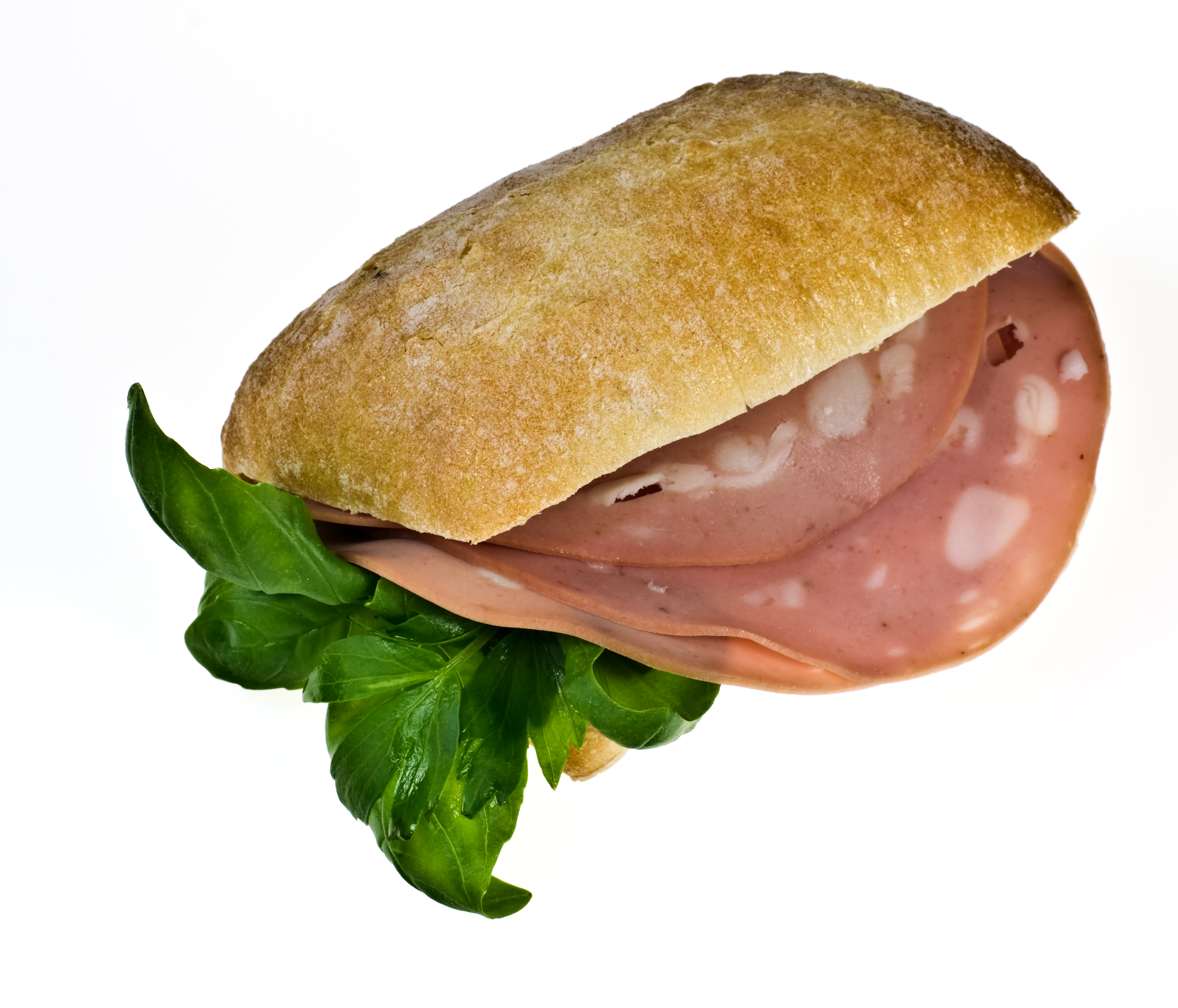
Panini with mortadella

Panini (/pəˈniːniː/), nowadays less commonly called panino (Italian pronunciation: [paˈniːno]), are sandwiches made with Italian bread (such as ciabatta and michetta), usually served warm after grilling or toasting.

In many English-speaking countries, the name panini is given to a grilled sandwich made using various breads. The bread is cut horizontally and filled with deli ingredients, and often served warm after having been pressed by a warming grill.

== Etymology ==
Panini is a word of Italian origin. In Italian, the noun panino (Italian: [paˈniːno]; pl.: panini) is a diminutive of pane (lit. 'bread') and refers to a bread roll. Panino imbottito (lit. 'stuffed panini') refers to a sandwich, but the word panino is also often used alone to indicate a sandwich in general.

In English-dominant countries, panini is widely used as the singular form, with the plural form panini or paninis, although some speakers use singular panino and plural panini as in Italian.

== History ==
Although the first US reference to panini dates to 1956, and a precursor appeared in a 16th-century Italian cookbook, the sandwiches became trendy in Milanese bars, called paninoteche, in the 1970s and 1980s. Trendy US restaurants began selling panini, with distinctive variations appearing in various cities.

During the 1980s, the term paninaro arose in Italy to denote a member of a youth culture represented by patrons of sandwich bars, such as Milan's Al Panino. Paninari were depicted as right-leaning, fashion-fixated individuals, delighting in showcasing early-1980s consumer goods as status symbols.

== See also ==
Media related to Panini at Wikimedia Commons Media related to Mortadella sandwiches at Wikimedia Commons

- List of sandwiches
- Panuozzo
- Tramezzino
