= Tramezzino =

Triangular Italian sandwich made with white bread and no crusts

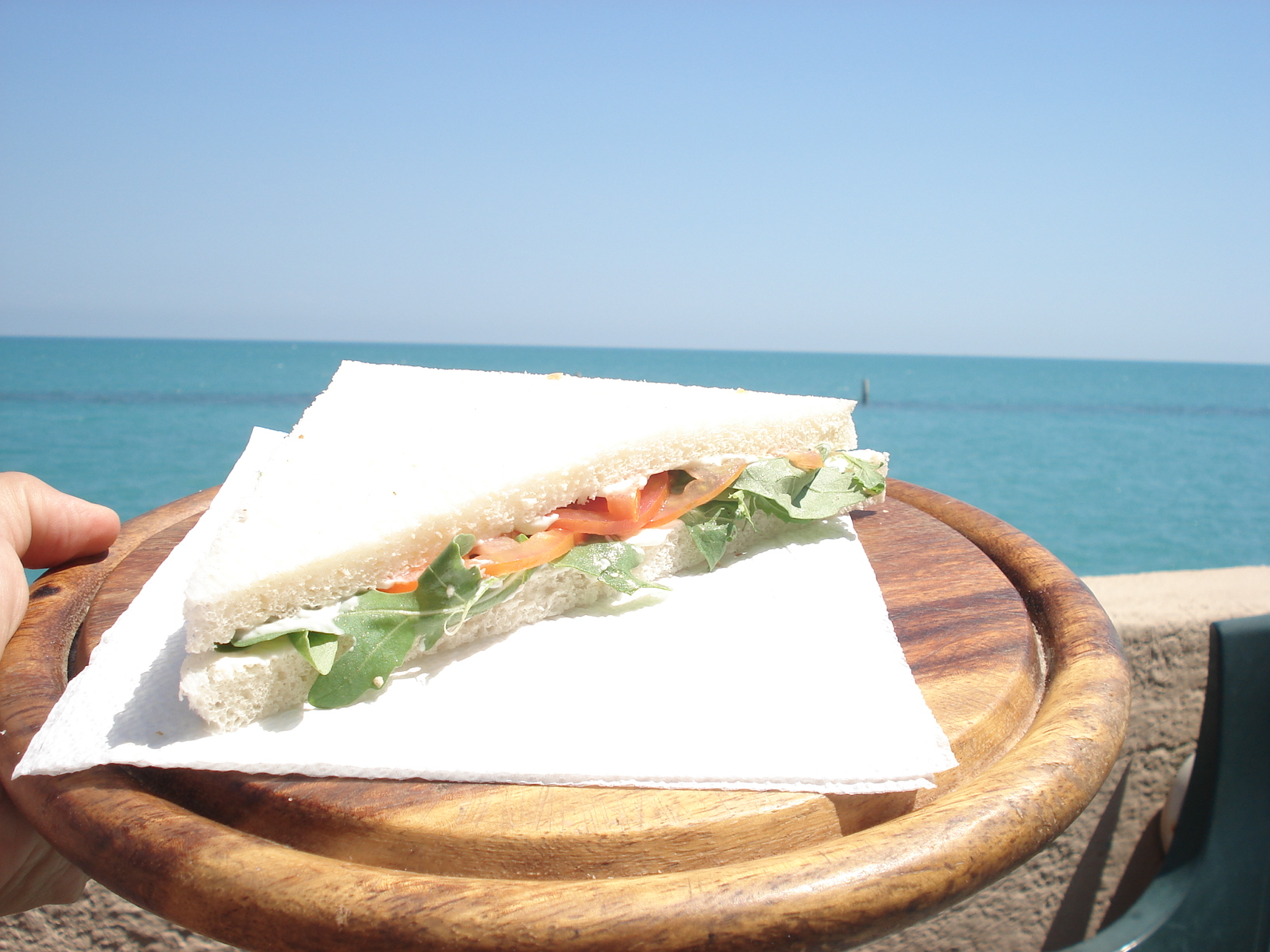
- Place of origin: Italy
- Region or state: Piedmont
- Main ingredients: Bread, various fillings

Tramezzino (Italian: [tramedˈdziːno]; pl.: tramezzini) is an Italian sandwich consisting of two slices of soft white bread, with the crusts removed, usually cut in a triangle. Popular fillings include prosciutto, tuna, and olives, but many other fillings can be used.

== Etymology ==
The term tramezzino was coined by Gabriele D'Annunzio to replace the English word sandwich. It is the diminutive of the word tramezzo, meaning 'in-between' (formed with the addition of the suffix -ino).

== History ==
The origin of the tramezzino can be found in the Caffè Mulassano in Piazza Castello, Turin, where it was devised in 1925 as an alternative to English tea sandwich.

== See also ==
Media related to Tramezzini at Wikimedia Commons

- List of sandwiches
- Panini
- Panuozzo
