= Mazapégul =

Mischievous elves in the folklore of Romagna, Italy

The mazapégul, also known by several other names in Romagnol, are mischievous nocturnal elves in the folklore of Romagna, especially around the Apennines of Forlì, in northern Italy.

Portrayed as homunculi with feline features, mazapégul wear a distinctive red cap, which they require to perform their mischief. They disrupt sleep, make objects disappear, and disturb animals, especially horses, whose tails and manes they braid. Mazapégul are particularly attracted to beautiful young girls, with whom they tend to sleep and compliment. A mazapégul's power can be removed by stealing its cap, performing an action to disgust the elf, or reciting a poem while walking along a rope.

The mazapégul, particularly its red cap, features in Romagnol carnival costumes. It is often incorporated into cultural events in Romagna aimed at children and families, and its name has been adopted in music and by a brewery.

== Names and etymology ==
The mazapégul's name varies across Romagna, including variants of mazapegolo, caicarel, and fuletà. The variant mazapedar is common in Faenza and mazapigur is common in Cesena. In hilly areas by the Apennines, it is called cheicatrèpp (lit. 'belly-crusher'), cheicabìgul (lit. 'navel-crusher'), or cheicarëll, and at the legend's southern extremities, the names sprivìnkle, spèrvinkle, and sprèvinkle appear.

The etymology of mazapégul is contested. It may relate to the Italian mazzapicchio (poleaxe), or some kind of murderer (maza meaning 'murder') of children, stones, fathers, or sheep. In another hypothesis, the term combines maza, suggesting a heavy object, and pegul, suggesting something viscous and sticky, to leave the impression of a weight trapping a person from above.

== History ==
The mazapégul descend from the mythological incubus, a demon that would disturb sleeping humans and take advantage of women. They share characteristics with elves from other regions of Italy, such as the Laurieddhu of southern Italy, as well as from the French Vosges. Folklore surrounding the mazapégul is recorded in a survey of early 15th-century Cesena by Giuliano Fantaguzzi.

According to one legend, the mazapégul were domestic elves of the Lombards, who imported them to Romagna following their territorial expansion. In a 1924 fable distributed in regional schools, John the Apostle eschewed his responsibility to wipe out elves and fairies that preceded Jesus Christ, and the creatures hid in a pine forest in Classe, near Ravenna.

== Attributes and behaviour ==
The elves are portrayed as a cross between apes and homunculi, with grey fur, also resembling cats or monkeys. They wear a distinctive red cap, which they require to perform their mischief.

The mazapégul are credited for causing nightmares, including sleep paralysis or sensations of suffocation, ruffling women's hair in their sleep, causing stomach pains, making objects disappear, playing the cymbals, causing dishes to fly, and making victims gain weight. In the countryside, they disturb animals, especially horses, who wake in the mornings covered in sweat and with braided tails and manes. The elves especially visit houses on the night of Samhain.

Attracted by beautiful young girls, the elves enter their rooms at night and fall asleep on their stomachs. They compliment them, saying: "What beautiful eyes! What beautiful hair!" (Romagnol: Ad bëll òcc! Ad bëll cavell!). Girls responding kindly are brought good luck, and the mazapégul rewards them with stockings and tidying their room. A girl who disrespects a mazapégul becomes the victim of its mischief: the elf could bite, shake, scratch or pinch her, and they are especially mischievous with women's breasts.

== Protections ==
A mazapégul's presence can be identified from paw marks if flour is laid in front of a house's entrance, and from its red cap being pinned by a well. If its cap is stolen or thrown into the well, either its vanquisher is tormented at night with the demand of "give me back my cap!" (dam indrì e' mi britin!), or they are safe from the elf's torment, as the mazapégul merely laments its demands to passers-by at the well.

Priests and exorcists ward off the mazapégul. Other traditions against the mazapégul include keeping a pitchfork under beds and in stables, placing a broom in front of a house's entrance, planting a caveja, a wrought iron rod symbolic of Romagna, outside the house, and sprinkling grains of rice on a windowsill so that the mazapégul is distracted by counting them until daybreak.

In one ritual to rid the mazapégul, a tormented victim straddles a window while eating cheese. In another, they sit on a chamber pot in their bedroom and, while defecating, eat bread with one hand and pretend to remove headlice with the other, which disgusts the mazapégul, who tells its former victim: "Ugly cow, you eat and piss and shit!" (Bruta vaca, t’megn et pess et fè la caca!)

In another ritual, a tormented victim ties a noose at the top of seven yards of rope used for pairing cattle, and then suspends the rope outside for three days and three nights, before tying it to the foot of their bed. Then, the victim recites a poem while walking along the rope barefoot:

Poem against the Mazapégul
Romagnol

Corda di canva fata da nov lìgul,
cun una ciapra e cun i chév a spìgul;
corda par imbalze’ e’ caval de’ re
cun e’ pél négar e balzan da tre;
par inlazè e’ cavron dl’anma daneda
ch’l’à la rogna cun la schena pleda;
pr impiadurè la bes-cia buvarena,
pr ande int la val a fe tri cuv ad zlena;
corda d’canva pr al campan da mòrt,
corda pr e’ col dla speia screca fort;
corda di canva pr impicher e’ ledar,
bona par impicher e’ mazapédar.

Italian

Corda di tela fatta di nove legacci,
con una capra e con i capelli a spazzola;
corda per imbracare il cavallo del re
con il pelo nero e balzana di tre;
per legare il caprone dell'anima dannata
che ha la rogna con la schiena piegata;
per impietosire la bestia bovina,
per andare nella valle a fare tre covoni di legna;
corda di tela per il campana dei morti,
corda per il collo della spada molto affilata;
corda di tela per impiccare il ladro,
buona per impiccare il mazapégul.

English

Canvas rope made of nine ties,
with a goat and brush-like hair;
a rope to harness the king's horse
with black fur and a three-spot white mark;
to tie the damned soul's goat
with scabies and a bent back;
to pity the bovine beast,
to go into the valley to make three bundles of wood;
canvas rope for the death knell;
canvas rope for the neck of the very sharp sword;
canvas rope to hang the thief,
good for hanging the mazapégul.

== In popular culture ==
The mazapégul, particularly its red cap, features in Romagnol carnival costumes. The elf has been the subject of several local songs, and is often incorporated into local cultural events aimed at children and families.

In Romagnol, misbehaving children are called mazapégul. A craft beer from Civitella di Romagna is known as Mazapegul, as well as a regional band, Mazapegul, active in the 1990s.

Inspired by the mazapégul, Antonio Morri's 1840 dictionary defines mazzapëdar as "that oppression, and almost suffocation, that others sometimes feel when sleeping on their back".

== See also ==
- Folklore of Italy
- Piada dei morti – a sweet focaccia topped with raisins, almonds, walnuts, and pine nuts, and traditionally eaten in November for All Souls' Day in Rimini
- Redcap – a mischievous goblin in the folklore of the Anglo-Scottish border, who also wears a red cap
