= Caveja =

Agricultural equipment and symbol of Romagna, Italy

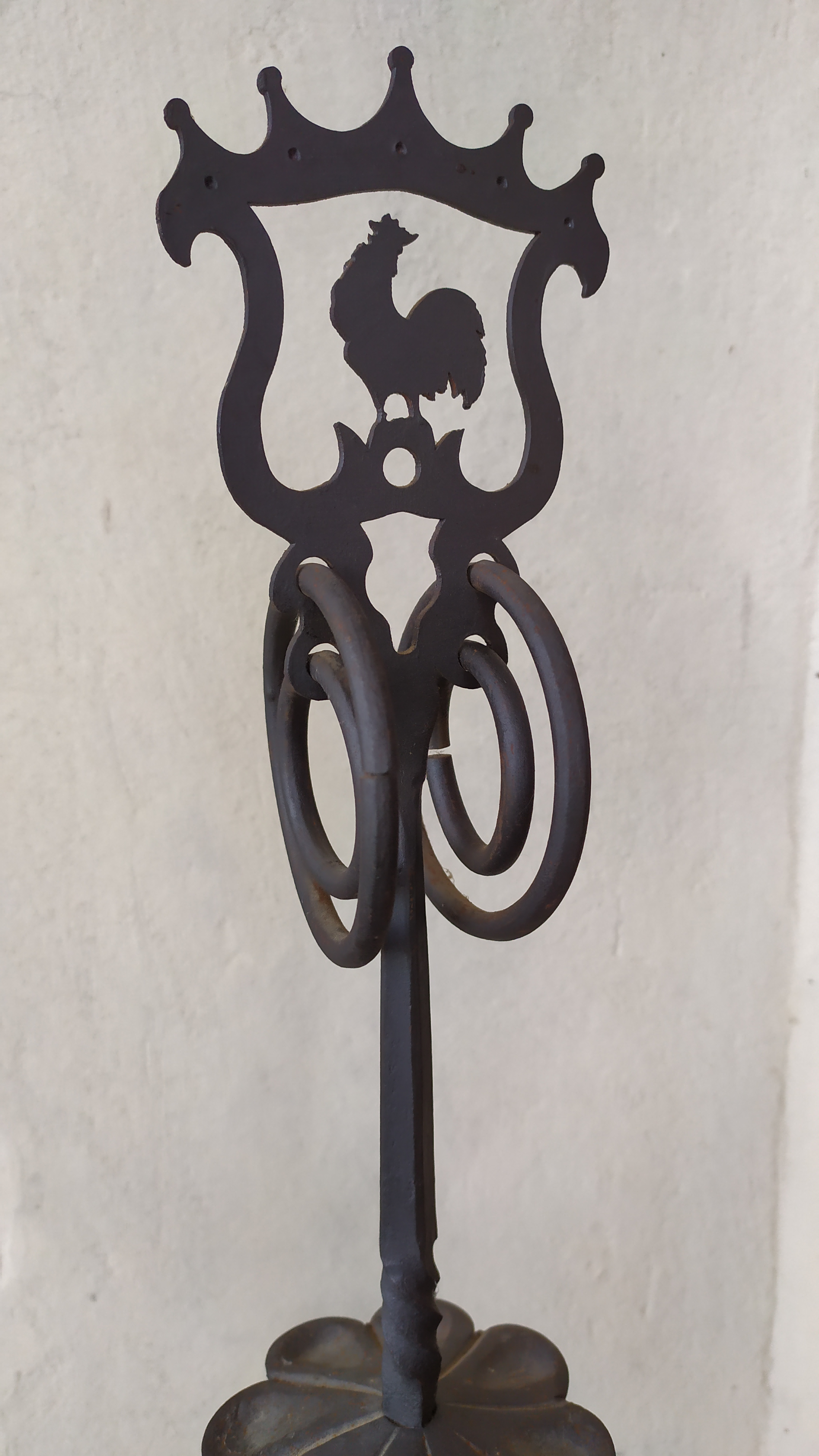
A caveja with the pagella of a rooster, November 2020

A caveja (pl. caveje, lit. 'ankle') is a wrought iron rod which was fixed at the helm of a plough or cart to prevent the dislodging of an ox's yoke in the event of a sudden stop. It is a symbol of the historical region of Romagna in northern Italy, where it was widely used. In the rest of Italy, the caveja is more commonly known as a cavicchio or chiodella.

== Use and decorations ==
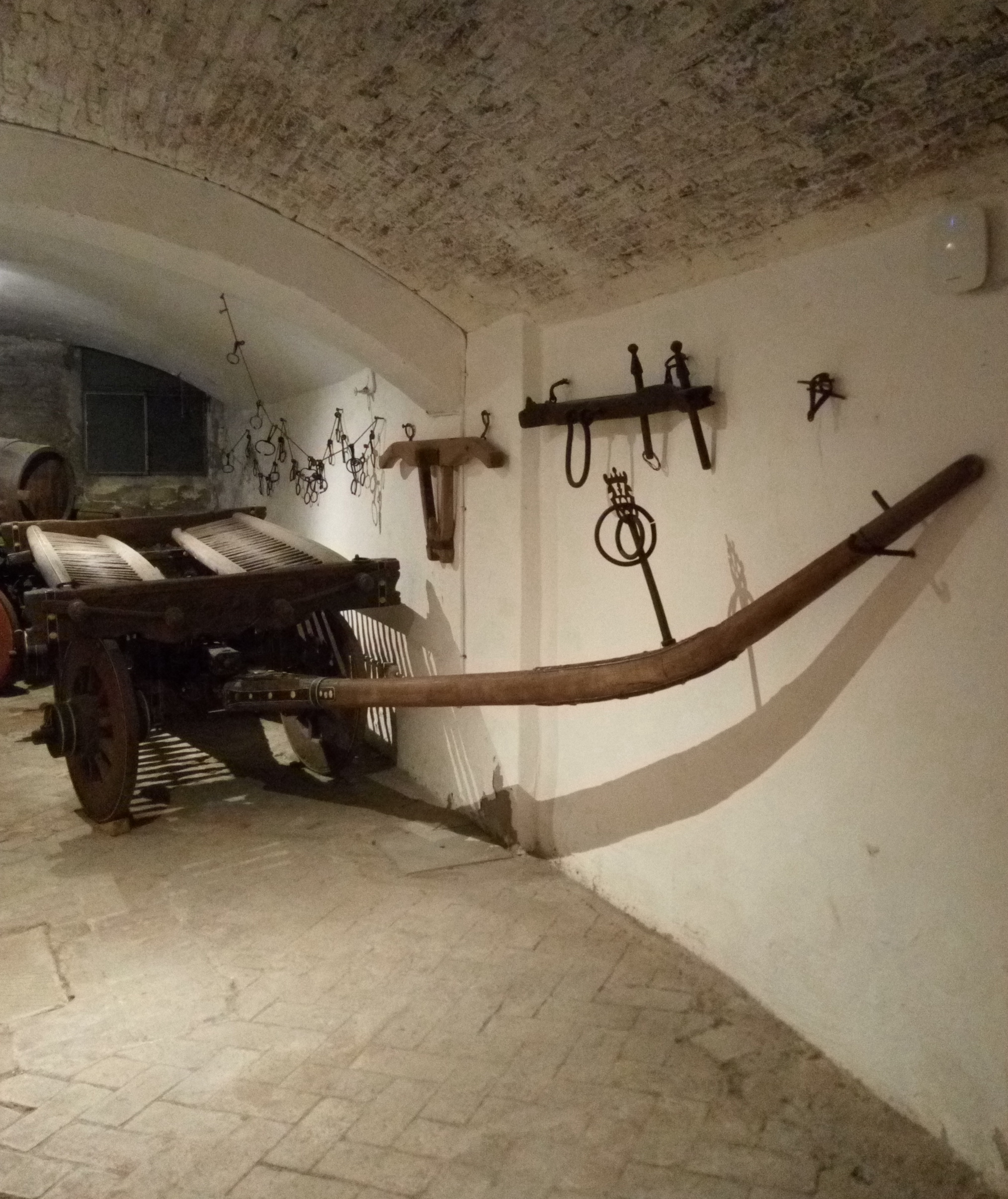
A cart with a caveja at the helm, October 2023

In the agricultural societies of Romagna, a caveja was fixed at the helm of a plough or cart, which would be driven by two oxen side by side. The caveja pinned the oxen's shared yoke to the helm, preventing the yoke from dislodging in the event of a sudden stop. The caveja also alleviated the yoke's weight on the oxen.

Each caveja is topped by a stylised motif known as a pagella. Typical pagelle include depictions of a rooster, a crescent moon, the Sun, an eagle, a dragon, hearts, or small breasts (representing prosperity). Some pagelle adopted religious motifs, such as a cross, dove (representing the Holy Spirit), or peacock (representing the Resurrection). Coloured bows could be added for further decoration.

Between one and three pairs of rings hang on the pagella. The rings resonate with lively sounds as the oxen are driven, leading to the caveja's alternative name of caveja cantarena (lit. 'singing ankle'). Originally, a single ring was used to assist manoeuvres; the jingle it emitted served a further practical purpose by alerting other road users of the oxen.

Along with church bells, the rings would be tied between Maundy Thursday and Holy Saturday to deafen them as part of the religious observance of Holy Week. In some areas of Romagna, the caveja is called caveja campanera (lit. 'ringing ankle'), attributed to a legend of a town that temporarily replaced its broken church bell with a caveja.

== History ==
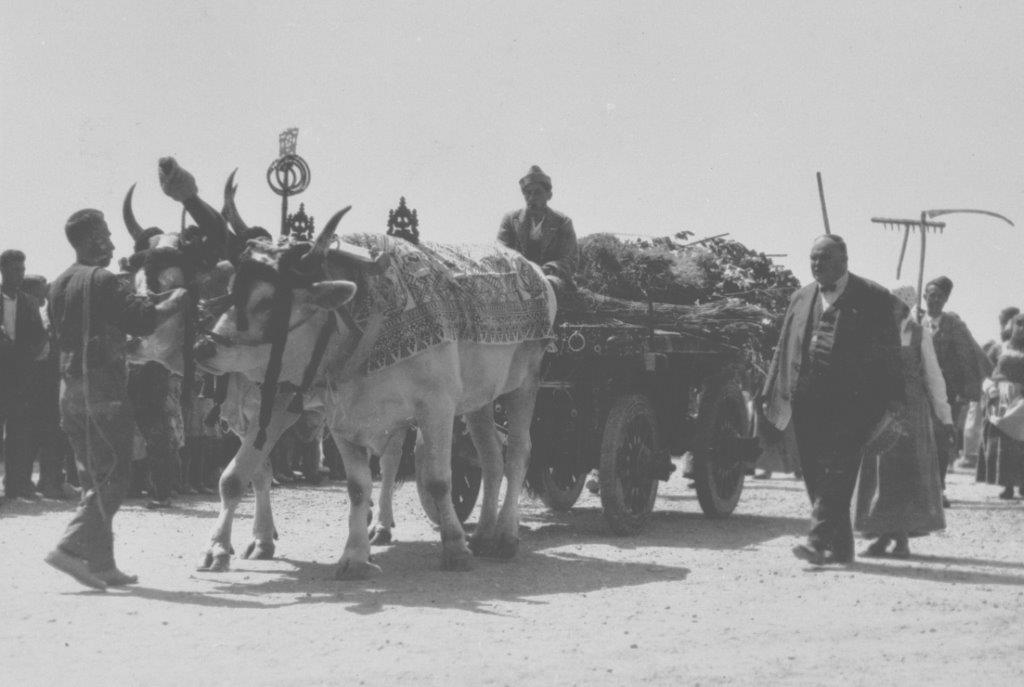
In this photograph from 1928, a caveja is visible above the heads of a pair of festively-decorated oxen.

The earliest examples of caveje are undecorated metal pins dating to the 14th and 15th centuries. The metal pins were superior to wooden alternatives, which were susceptible to wear and tear from rubbing against the oxen. Over time, additional rings were added to the caveja for the pleasantness of their jingle. By the mid-18th century, the caveja had become a status symbol: wealthier families were distinguished by more pairs of rings and more elaborate decorations. Caveje were especially exhibited at village fairs, with some families owning "parade" caveje not intended for agricultural use. It was traditional for the caveja to be part of a bride's dowry, with a bronze ring in their stem and hearts in their pagelle.

The caveja features in Romagna's folklore. In one ritual, the azdôra, the oldest woman in the house, could tell the sex of an unborn child by making the sign of the cross with a caveja, circling the seated pregnant woman three times, and placing the caveja on a base by a lighted candle. If the left rings stopped chiming first, it suggested the birth of a boy, while the right rings suggested a girl, and an indeterminate result suggested a miscarriage. The caveja was also used in rituals to avert storms, pray for the forgiveness of debts, bless the houses of newlyweds, and capture bees. The caveja could also be used to ward off the mazapégul, mischievous nocturnal elves, by planting it outside a tormented victim's house.

== In popular culture ==
An unofficial flag of Romagna, depicting a rooster holding a caveja

The caveja is among Romagna's most recognisable symbols. It features in unofficial regional flags, the most popular of which depicts a rooster holding a caveja on a red and yellow background. Some hotels and restaurants in Romagna are named after the caveja. In 1963, a regional journalism prize was known as the Caveja d'oro (transl. Golden Caveja), a name shared with a regional cinematography prize launched in 1983.

A 1908 poem by Giovanni Pascoli describes farmers braking a wagon using a "statoio with a ringing bell", which he compares to "a ship's mast". The first literary mention of the caveja instead appears in La Cavêja degli anëll (1912), a Romagnol poem by Aldo Spallicci. The poem compares the caveja to "a campanile that unties its bells", with "all the passion of a song that dies", "a sound that seems silver, like the laughter of a child who never stays still", and "the big voice of a father...that would like to be bad and instead is a friend". The poem concludes that the caveja is "the good music of fatigue". Spallicci's poem is widely attributed with promoting the caveja's status as a symbol of Romagna.

Following the 2023 Emilia-Romagna floods, several fundraisers used the caveja to inspire donations to the region, including a calendar distributed by Il Resto del Carlino in Cesena, and a series of personalised keys featuring the caveja on one side to raise funds for the Manfrediana Library in Faenza.
