= Piadina romagnola =

Thin Italian flatbread

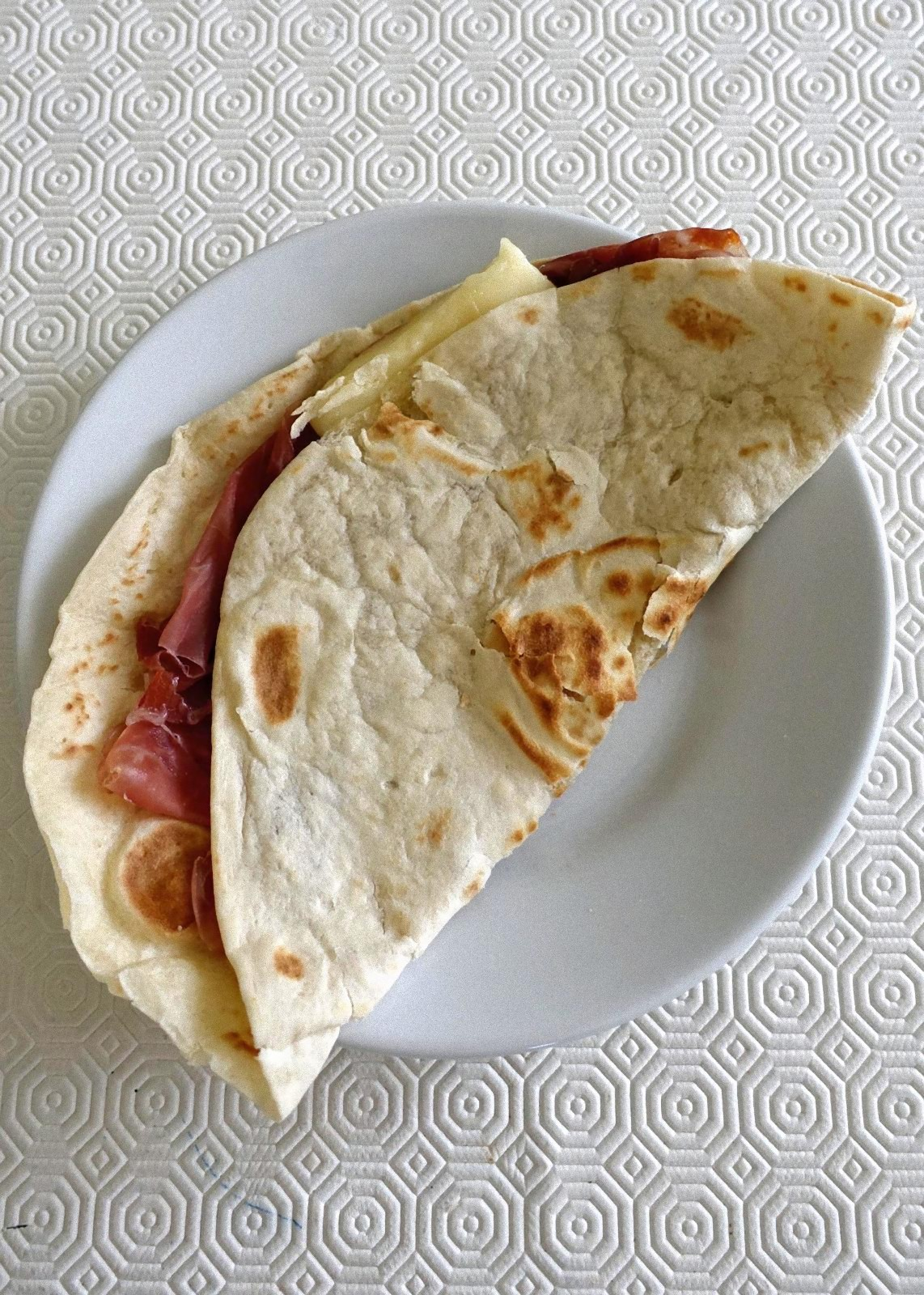
- Alternative names: Piadina, piada
- Type: Flatbread
- Place of origin: Italy; San Marino
- Region or state: Romagna
- Main ingredients: Flour, lard or olive oil, salt, water

Piadina romagnola (pronounced [pjaˈdiːna romaɲˈɲɔːla]) or simply piadina, traditionally piada (pronounced [ˈpjaːda]; Romagnol: pièda), is a thin Italian flatbread, typically prepared in the Romagna historical region (which mostly consists of the Italian provinces of Forlì-Cesena, Ravenna, and Rimini, and the Republic of San Marino). It is usually made with white flour, lard or olive oil, salt, and water. The dough was traditionally cooked on a terracotta dish (locally called teggia or testo), although nowadays flat pans or electric griddles are commonly used.

Piadina has been added to the list of the prodotti agroalimentari tradizionali (PAT) of the Emilia-Romagna region, and to the protected geographical indication of the European Union in 2014.

== Origin ==
Since ancient Rome flatbreads like this were used, the first mention of the piadina was in 1317, in the Descriptio provinciæ Romandiolæ, when papal legate Angel de Grimoard describes its recipe: "It's made with grain wheat mixed with water and seasoned with salt. It can also be made with milk and seasoned with a bit of lard."

== Etymology ==
The etymology of the word piadina is uncertain; many think the term piada (piê, pièda, pìda) was borrowed from the Greek word for 'long, narrow dish'. Others think the term was borrowed from other languages because of the widespread use of similar foods throughout the Eastern Roman Empire. The term piada was officialised by Giovanni Pascoli, who adapted the Romagnol word piè into its more Italian form.

== Types and preparation ==
Two different types of traditional piadina can be found in Romagna:

- Piadina romagnola, a thicker piadina typical of the areas of Forlì, Cesena, and Ravenna
- Piadina riminese, a thinner version from Rimini

=== Piadina romagnola ===
Until the 1940s, this type of piadina traditionally used to be made with only wheat flour, lard, salt and water. Since families used to be made up of ten people on average, piadina tended to be large, with a diameter of over 40 cm (16 in) and 1.5–2 cm (0.6–0.8 in) thick. Generally, no yeast was used, with the exception of small amounts of the same sourdough starter used to make bread. The piadina would be cooked on specific artisanal slabs made by firing a mix of locally sourced clays in wood-fired ovens.

Since the 1950s, piadina has been made in smaller sizes, with a diameter of 25–30 cm (9.8–12 in) and 0.5–1 cm 0.5–1 cm (0.2–0.4 in) thick. Slabs made of common terracotta and produced in local brickworks were used for the new cooking method, but they were only suitable for cooking over firewood or in newer kitchens, as a flame that could cover the whole underside of the slab was necessary. Starting from the 1960s, trays made of cast iron, iron and aluminium became widespread thanks to their higher conductivity, which made them suitable for gas stoves, making it possible to cook piadina in any type of kitchen. In order to make the piadina softer, more crumbly and easier to preserve, leavening agents such as baking soda and, later on, leavening agents for desserts (mainly composed of Tetrasodium pyrophosphate) were introduced in the recipe.

To avoid the formation of steam bubbles inside the dough during cooking, the piadina is pierced with a fork. Once well cooked, brick red (never black) spots should be visible, and the piadina should be held vertically in order to air out and let out moisture. To help this process, specific wooden racks are often used.

Piadina romagnola can vary depending on the area. Around Forlì and Cesena, it is thicker and bigger than in the area around Imola, where it is smaller and the size of an open hand.

=== Piadina riminese ===
The typical piadina in the province of Rimini is quite different than the other type. It is very thin (2–3 mm) and so flexible that it can be folded on itself. During cooking, some bubbles form and create the characteristic so called "eyes". Unlike piadina romagnola (from Forlì-Cesena and Ravenna), which is supposed to dry out, piadina riminese is supposed to hold a certain amount of moisture and it is therefore placed on a surface or stacked after cooking.

== Modern era ==
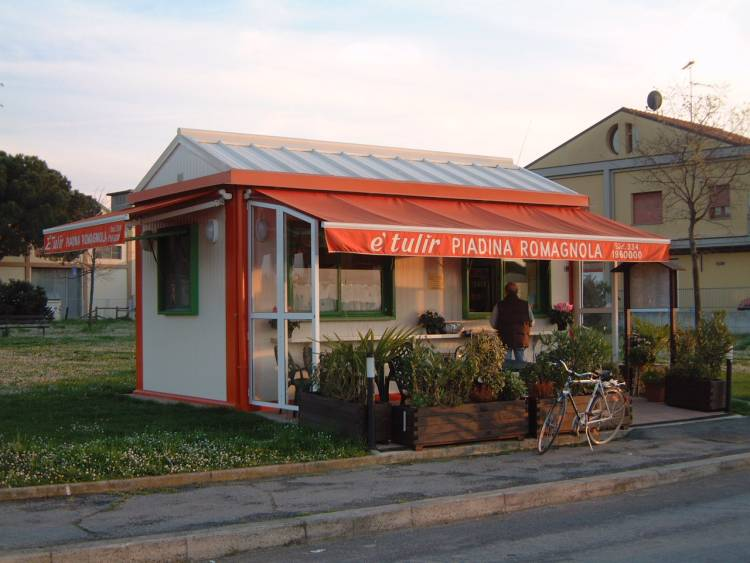
A piadineria in Cesena

Piadine are usually sold immediately after preparation in specialised kiosks (called piadinerie), filled with a variety of cheeses, salumi, and vegetables, but also with sweet fillings, including Nutella or jam. There may be small differences depending on the zone of production. Piadine produced around Ravenna and Forlì are generally thicker, while those produced around Rimini and the Marche region are thinner and have a greater diameter.

Piadina has even found its way to space, eaten by a Russian astronaut as part of a Mediterranean diet experiment on the International Space Station.

La j'è bona in tot i mud, la j'è bona énca scundida sa' n'avì ancora capì, a scor propri dla pida.	Delicious with filling or even served plain, if you haven't already guessed, I am talking about the piadina.

According to Giovanni Pascoli,

Nothing speaks more of Romagna than this bread of ours... it is a symbol that speaks of devotion to our land.

— Romagna Piadina: from tradition to flavour

=== Shelf-stable commercial piadina and PGI controversy ===
Since the late 20th century, precooked and shelf-stable piadine have started being available in supermarkets all around Italy. These products are generally similar to piadina riminese, which is more suitable for a longer storage period. A PGI procedural guideline has been created for these commercial products and for their large-scale distribution in order to guarantee certain conditions. However, they still are very different from traditional piadina that has been freshly cooked at home or in kiosks. The PGI guidelines allow the use of wheat flour produced anywhere and preservatives such as food alcohol, and they allow the sale of products cooked months earlier. As a result, these guidelines have been criticized by Romagna restaurant and kiosk owners who produce and sell fresh piadine, which are not counted as PGI. Even the Slow Food organization and other Romagna cuisine experts have expressed their criticism in this regard.

=== Protected geographical indication ===
With the Commission Implementing Regulation No 1174 of the Official Journal of the European Union, piadina romagnola or piada romagnola, including the Riminese variation, has obtained the protected geographical indication (PGI) status on the area of the provinces of Forlì-Cesena, Ravenna, Rimini, and the east side of the province of Bologna, east of the River Sillaro. Its symbol is a stylised rooster and an ear of wheat.

Japan officially registered the collective trademark of piadina romagnola in 2024.

The National Institute of Industrial Property of Brazil also registered piadina romagnola as a PGI product in 2025, ensuring protection comparable to that of the European Union.

== Variations ==
Fried piada

It is widespread in the area of Forlì, Faenza, and Imola (where many piadina kiosks prepare it) but it is not too common in the rest of Romagna. It can be made using dough meant for bread, by rolling it out and cutting it in the shape of diamonds or circles to fry in lard. Another way of preparing it is to use the common dough for piadina and including baking powder or instant yeast to make it less puffy.

Greased piada

Ancient type of piadina made with flour and water kept from the cooking process of cotechino. This water is not thrown away but used in piadina as it is already flavoured with fat, salt, and pepper.

Layered piada

In the area bordering the region of Marche, a type of layered piadina, similar to crescia urbinate, is common. To prepare it, the dough is divided into portions which are rolled out, covered with lard, rolled up, shaped into a spiral and finally rolled out again. This procedure makes it possible to create a sheet of dough with internal layers separated by lard, which are still present after cooking.

== Sweet piadine ==
- Sweet piada or gudaia: piadina made with a dough that includes eggs and sugar.
- Piada dei morti: sweet focaccia native to Rimini, topped with raisins, almonds, walnuts, and pine nuts and named after piadina for their shared circular shape.
