= Far darrig =

Faerie of Irish mythology

Fear Dearg
Creature information
- Other name: Fear dearg
- Grouping: Fairy
- Similar entities: Redcap; Leprechaun

Origin
- Country: Ireland

A far darrig or fear dearg is a faerie type in Irish mythology. The name far darrig is an Anglophone pronunciation of the Irish words fear dearg, meaning Red Man, as the far darrig is said to wear a red coat and cap. They are sometimes known as Rat Boys as they are said to be rather fat, have dark, hairy skin, long snouts and skinny tails. The far derrig is generally described as short, while sometimes described as tall. It's said the far derrig has the ability to change sizes. An 1832 description from T. Crofton Croaker in Munster says the far derrig are around 2.5 feet tall with a wrinkled face, long grey hair, and a sugarloaf hat.

According to Fairy and Folk Tales of the Irish Peasantry, the far darrig is classified as a solitary fairy along with the leprechaun and the clurichaun, all of whom are "most sluttish, slouching, jeering, mischievous phantoms". The far darrig in particular is described as one who "busies himself with practical joking, especially with gruesome joking". One example of this is replacing babies with changelings. They are also said to have some connection to nightmares. Refusing any request from a far derrig was unlucky, as they were very imaginative in thinking of punishments.

When not playing jokes, the far darrig spend much of their time smoking by campfires and thinking. They will eat a meal if offered, and the presence of one in a house is said to bring good luck.

== See also ==
- Redcap
- Leprechaun
- Alp
