= Piada dei morti =

Sweet bread from Rimini, Italy

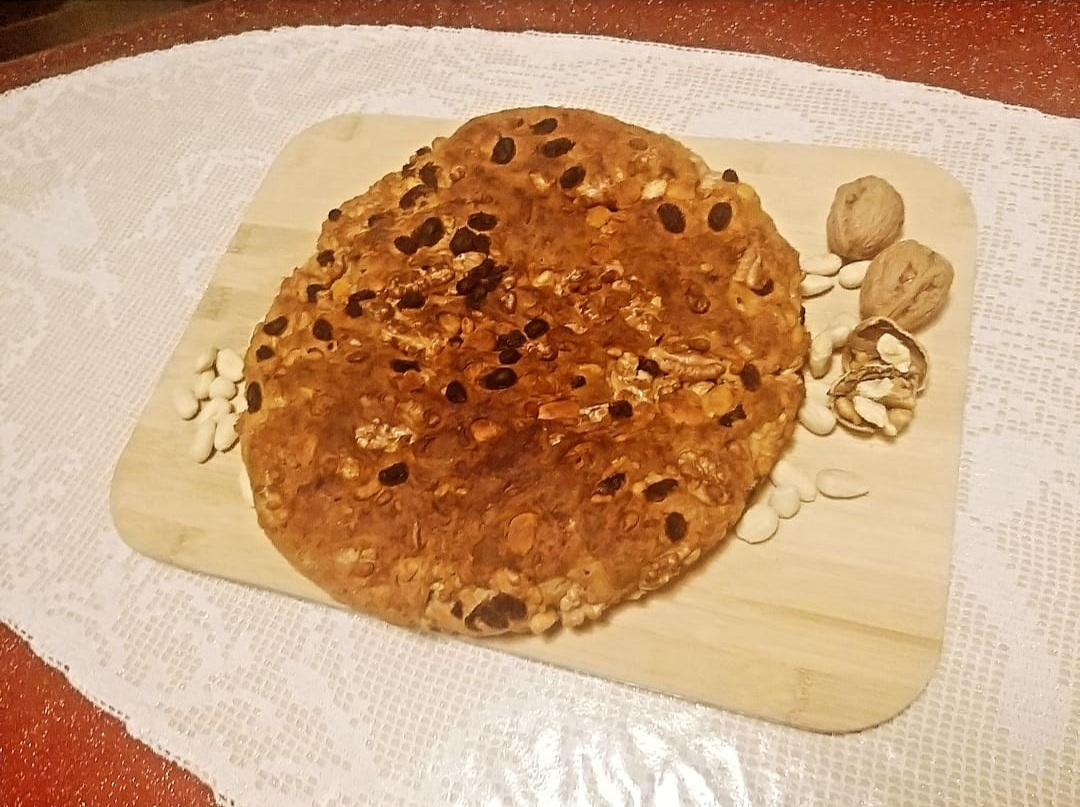
- Type: Focaccia
- Course: Dessert
- Place of origin: Italy
- Region or state: Rimini, Emilia-Romagna
- Main ingredients: Raisins, almonds, walnuts, pine nuts

Piada dei morti (lit. 'piada of the dead') is a sweet focaccia topped with raisins, almonds, walnuts, and pine nuts. It is local to Rimini, in the Emilia-Romagna region of Italy, and traditionally eaten in November for All Souls' Day.

== Overview ==
Though its name suggests that it is a piadina, a traditional flatbread also native to Romagna, piada dei morti is a sweet focaccia, a soft bread. The association with piadina arises from the piada dei morti's circular shape.

The bread is topped with raisins, almonds, walnuts, and pine nuts. The dried fruit must be topped rather than inside the dough. In traditional recipes, piada dei morti contains grape must, though modern recipes soak the raisins in Sangiovese wine instead.

Piada dei morti is usually served warm, for breakfast or as an afternoon snack. It is traditionally eaten in November for All Souls' Day, but appears from October, including for Rimini's patronal feast, San Gaudenzo, on 14 October, and during Halloween trick-or-treating.

== Origins ==
The origins of piada dei morti are contested. In local folklore, the bread is attributed to ancestral recipes from the times of the Celts in Romagna, or the Senones. On the night of Samhain, mischievous nocturnal domestic elves known as the Mazapégul would visit houses while the spirits of the dead would return to their homes and towns. Piada dei morti emerged as a seasonal delicacy to welcome the deceased spirits.

Others attribute the bread to Ciro Brunori, a pastry chef at the Antica Pasticceria Vecchi in Rimini's Borgo San Giuliano, from the early 20th century.
