= Pizza bianca =

Roman flatbread

- Type: Flatbread
- Place of origin: Italy
- Region or state: Rome, Lazio

Pizza bianca is a type of flatbread originating in Rome, Italy. It is a plain yeast flatbread which more closely resembles focaccia than typical cheese-topped pizza. It can be split and filled with ingredients such as prosciutto, Parmesan cheese or rocket and is typically served hot. In 2019 the government of Italy declared Pizza Bianca Romana alla Pala del Fornaio a traditional agri-food product of Italy.

== Historical accounts ==
The mention of a pizza bianca mastunicola in 1666 in Italy was reported in a PDO file for the Associazione Verace Pizza Napoletana as a dough base coated with lard complemented with cheese and basil. The pizza bianca is mentioned again multiple times during the 19th century, along with the pizza rossa, by contemporaries from Italy and France. In 1903, Italian workers ate pizza bianca in the Old Port of Marseille.

== See also ==
- Roman cuisine
