= Redcap =

Goblin found in folklore

The redcap (or powrie) is a type of malevolent, murderous goblin found in folklore of the Anglo-Scottish border region. The redcap is said to inhabit ruined castles along the Anglo-Scottish border, especially those that were the scenes of tyranny or wicked deeds, and is known for soaking his cap in the blood of his victims. He is also known as Redcomb and Bloody Cap.

== Description and behaviour ==
Redcap is depicted as "a short, thickset old elf with long prominent teeth, skinny fingers armed with talons like eagles, large eyes of a fiery red colour, grisly hair streaming down his shoulders, iron boots, a pikestaff in his left hand, and a red cap on his head". When travellers take refuge in his lair, he flings huge stones at them, and if he kills them, he soaks his cap in their blood, giving it a crimson hue. He is unaffected by human strength, but can be driven away by words of Scripture or by the brandishing of a crucifix, which cause him to utter a dismal yell and vanish in flames, leaving behind a large tooth.

== Variants ==
The tale of a redcap in Perthshire depicts him as a more benign little man living in a room high up in Grantully Castle. He bestows good fortune on those who see or hear him.

The kabouter (kaboutermannekins) or redcaps of Dutch folklore are also very different and more akin to brownies. The word is usually translated "gnome".

The ruin of Blackett Tower, a border fortress that was owned by the Bell family in the parish of Kirkpatrick-Fleming in Dumfriesshire, was said to be haunted by a more traditional ghost known as "Old Red Cap" or "Bloody Bell". A description of the tower and ghost was given by William Scott Irving in the poem "Fair Helen" in which the "ghastly phantom" holds a bloody dagger beneath a red eastern moon.

The term redcap is also used in a more general sense. For example, in the village of Zennor in Cornwall fairies were often referred to as "red-caps" (including the more benevolent trooping fairies) because of their fondness for wearing green clothing and scarlet caps. This characteristic is demonstrated by an excerpt from the poem "The Fairies" by the Irish poet William Allingham: "Wee folk, good folk/trooping all together/Green jacket, red cap/and white owl's feather".

== Robin Redcap and William de Soulis ==
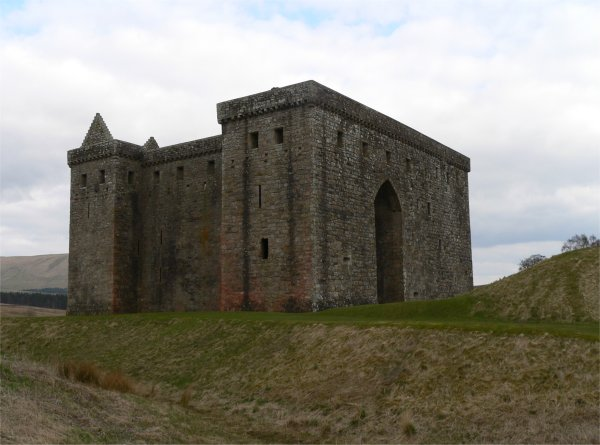
Hermitage Castle, home of Robin Redcap

Scottish nobleman William de Soulis was said in folklore to have a redcap familiar called "Robin Redcap". This entity was said to have wrought much harm and ruin in the lands of his master's dwelling, Hermitage Castle. Ultimately, William was (according to legend) taken to the Ninestane Rig, a stone circle near the castle, then wrapped in lead and boiled to death. In reality, William de Soulis was imprisoned in Dumbarton Castle and died there, following his confessed complicity in the conspiracy against Robert the Bruce in 1320.

Sir Walter Scott in Minstrelsy of the Scottish Border (1802) records a ballad written by John Leyden entitled "Lord Soulis" in which Redcap has granted his master safety against weapons and lives in a chest secured by three strong padlocks. Scott states that the redcap is a class of spirits that haunts old castles, and that every ruined tower in the south of Scotland was supposed to have one of these spirits residing within. Robin Redcap should not be confused with the mischievous hobgoblin known as Robin Roundcap of East Yorkshire folklore.

== See also ==
- Bluecap
- Far darrig
- Kobold
- Mazapégul
- Nain Rouge
