= Crescia =

Italian flatbread

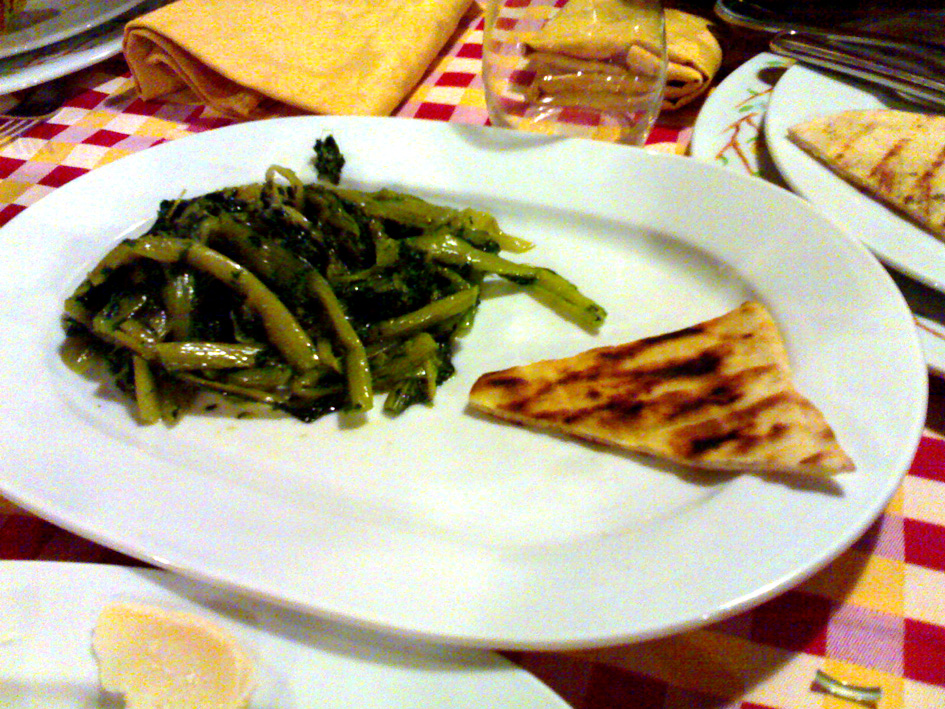
- Crescia with wild herbs
- Type: Flatbread
- Place of origin: Italy
- Region or state: Marche; Umbria
- Main ingredients: Flour, water, salt

Crescia (Italian: [ˈkreʃʃa]) is a thin Italian flatbread typically prepared in Marche and Umbria (Pesaro, Urbino, Ancona, Macerata, Perugia, and Terni). The crescia probably has a common ancestry to the piadina, to be found in the bread used by the Byzantine army, stationed for centuries in Romagna, in the north of the Marche (Pentapolis), and in the Umbrian Valley crossed by the Via Flaminia. The food is also known by the common name of "white pizza".

== Local variants ==
=== Urbino area ===
The urbinate crescia, also called crescia sfogliata, crostolo or, more rarely, piadina sfogliata, typical of Urbino and Montefeltro, is made with flour, eggs, water, lard, salt and pepper. The dough obtained with a rolling pin is greased with lard and rolled up on itself, so that it releases pieces that integrate with the rest of the dough. Pressed into a disc and cooked, it takes on a characteristic layered structure, golden and crunchy. Typically it is eaten hot with sausage, wild herbs, ham, loin or cheese. A variant, the crostolo di Urbania, provides for the replacement of wheat flour with polenta which remains attached to the cauldron.

=== Pesaro and Fano area ===
The crescia of Pesaro, often called "piadina", is widespread in the Pesaro area, in the Fano area and in the surrounding countryside, does not require the use of yeast, is rolled high with a rolling pin, and contains a high quantity of lard. There are two variants: the crescia vonta and crescia sfojeta. The crescia vonta is quite thick and after cooking it is greased on both sides with pork lard, then passed over the grill; sometimes it is stuffed with sautéed cabbage. The crescia sfojeta is also thick, rectangular in shape; it is rolled out for the first time, then folded and rolled out again with a rolling pin; in this way many distinct layers are obtained. Originally these were considered nutritious and intended for farmers recovering from manual labour.

=== Ancona area ===
In the province of Ancona, crescia is prepared with the same dough as bread, and is generally cooked on the grill, or, in a more traditional version, under the grill. It is usually eaten cu 'le foje, that is, with wild herbs, but it can also be combined with cured meats such as loin, salami and ham. A variant made with the leftovers of polenta sautéed on the plate is called cresciola in the areas of Iesi and Osimo. In Offagna (one of the castles of Ancona) there is an Accademia della Crescia, which organizes the local medieval festivals. This food was so important in the past that it gave its name to a common currency, the cresciolo.

=== Macerata area ===
Even in the province of Macerata, and throughout the Alto Chiascio area, crescia is prepared with bread dough, but takes on a consistency similar to that of Tuscan schiacciata. Round, with a broken edge and with dimples on the surface (which have the function of retaining the oil better), it is seasoned with oil, salt, onion or rosemary. Some historical variants foresee the use in the mixture of lard and pork cracklings (also called "grasselli" or "sgriscioli"), and the replacement of wheat flour with that of maize.

=== Ascoli Piceno area ===
Proceeding further south, in the internal areas of the province of Ascoli Piceno, now far from the area of Byzantine domination, the crescia gives way to the stuffed focaccia, or chichì stuffed, higher than the crescia and richly stuffed.

=== Umbria ===
The crescia of Gubbio is one of the best known and most appreciated traditional recipes: the dough is obtained by kneading very simple ingredients by hand: flour, water, salt and a chemical leavening agent like baking powder. Traditionally cooked on a "testo", or an iron disc placed directly on the embers of the fireplace, today it is normally cooked on cast iron griddles or non-stick pans directly on the stove. It is usually served with ham, various cold cuts, cheeses or with grilled sausages and spinach cooked in a pan.

== The crescia di Pasqua ==
In the northern and central Marche, the name of crescia is sometimes also used to indicate a food very different from the typical crescia: it is a high savory pie: the crescia di Pasqua or pizza di Pasqua or cheese pizza, typical of the Pesaro area, Ancona area and Macerata area, with a leavened dough flavored with pecorino cheese, which gives it a golden color and a strong flavor. The crescia or Easter pizza from Ancona and Macerata combines the Pesaro recipe with large pieces of pecorino cheese, which swell up during cooking and leave cavities inside the crescia; the cheese that runs on the outside becomes crunchy.
