= Focaccia =

Oven-baked Italian leavened flatbread

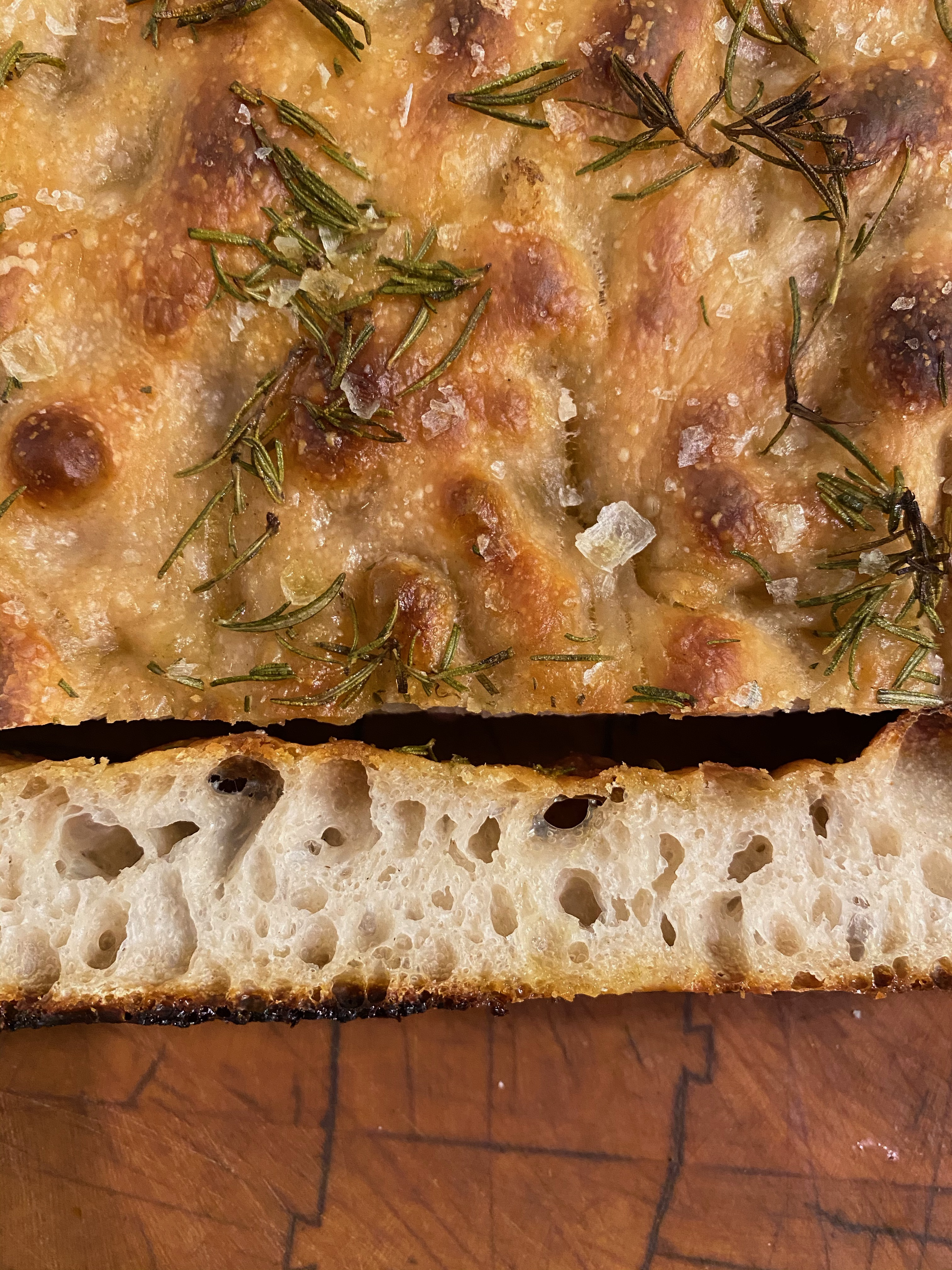
- Type: Flatbread
- Place of origin: Italy
- Main ingredients: High-gluten flour, oil, yeast

Focaccia (Note: Pronunciation: UK: /fəˈkætʃə/ fə-KATCH-ə, US: /foʊˈkɑːtʃ(i)ə/ foh-KAH-ch(ee-)ə, Italian: [foˈkattʃa]; Ligurian: fugassa, pronounced [fyˈɡasːa]; Barese: fecazze, pronounced [fəˈkattsə].) is a flat leavened oven-baked Italian bread. It is similar to a flatbread called pizza bianca (lit. 'white pizza') in Roman cuisine.

== Etymology ==
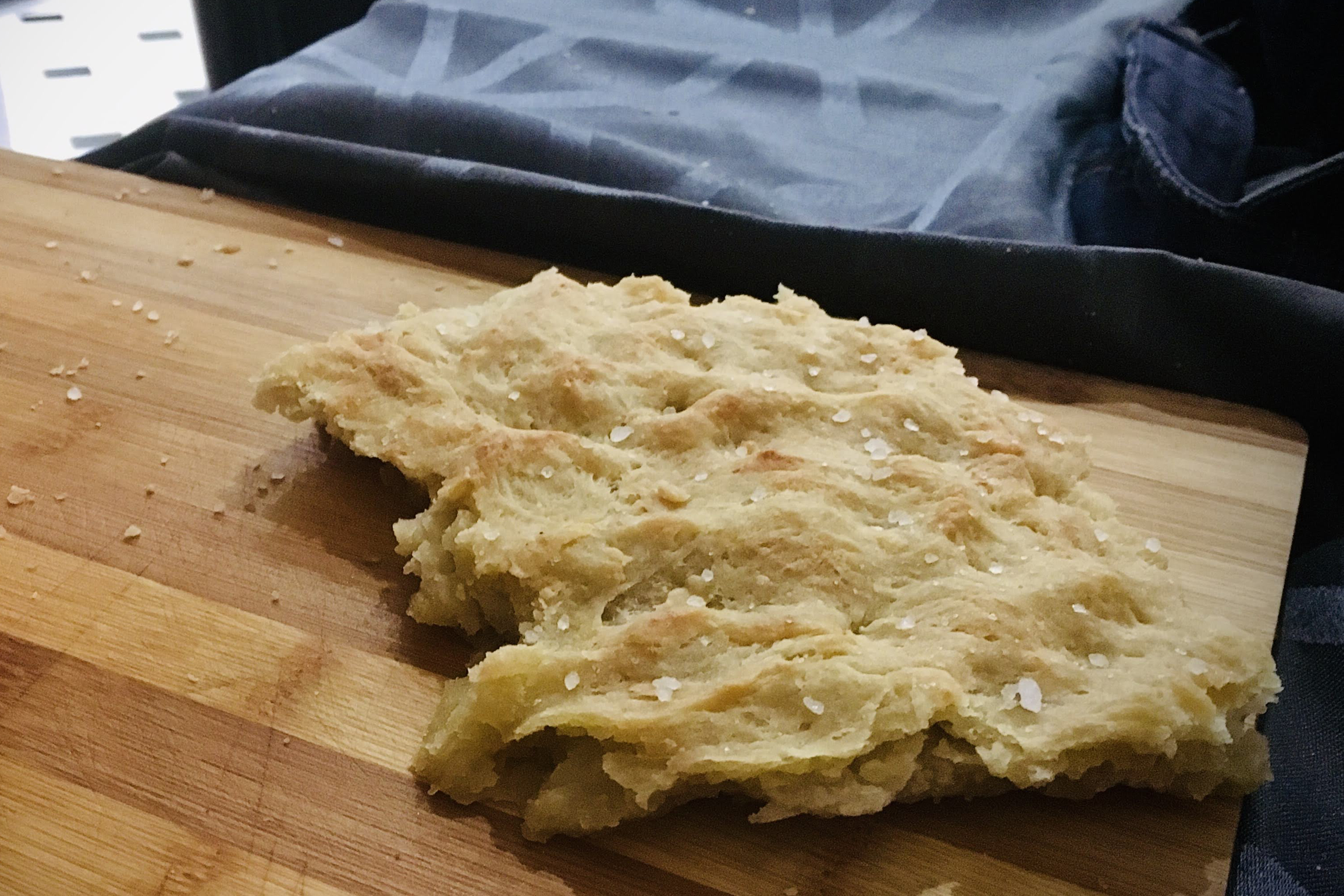
A piece of focaccia on a wooden cutting board

In ancient Rome, panis focacius was a flatbread baked on the hearth. The word is derived from the Latin focus, 'hearth, place for baking'. The basic recipe is thought by some to have originated with the Etruscans, but today it is widely associated with Ligurian cuisine, while outside Liguria the word usually refers to the Genoese variants.

The first attestation of the word focaccia dates back to the 14th century.

Focaccia is sometimes considered to be a variant of pizza in publications outside Italy, (Note: "Focaccia with Rosemary; Yield: 1 (12-inch [30cm]) pizza") although focaccia is left to rise after being flattened, while pizza is baked immediately. (Note: "What is the main difference between pizza and focaccia? The flattening of the dough, how long you take to roll out the dough, as well as the cooking time. Focaccia sits and rises before being baked. It is only put in the oven when the dough finishes rising. Pizza is placed in the oven immediately." – Gabriele Bonci)

== Regional variants ==
=== Ligurian variants ===
==== Focaccia genovese ====
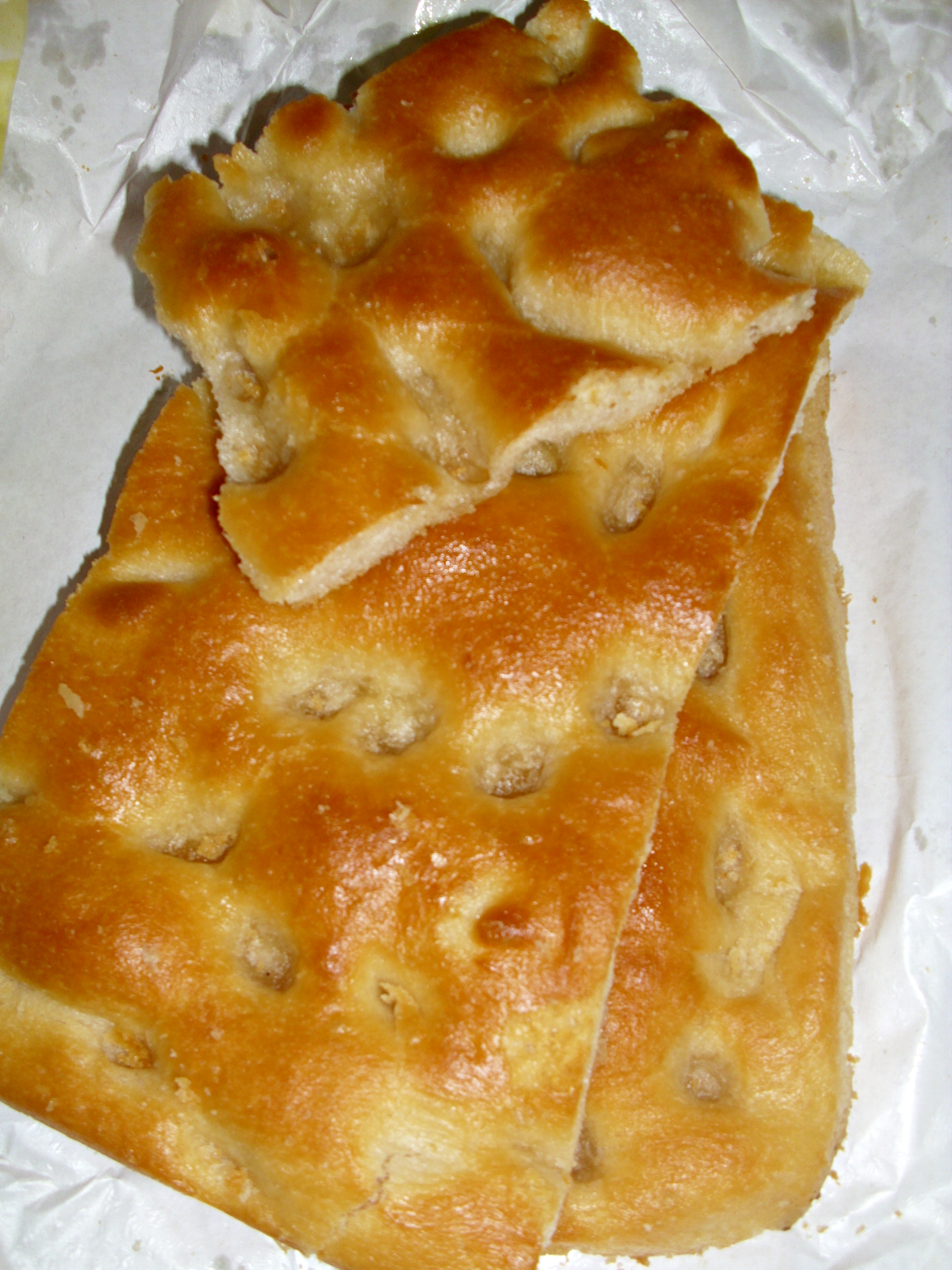
Genoese fügassa

Focaccia genovese (lit. 'Genoese focaccia'), marked by its finger-sized holes on its surface called "dimples" (ombrisalli in Genoese dialect), is brushed or sprinkled with olive oil, coarse salt, and sometimes water before the final rise.

In Genoa, focaccia is eaten in the morning at breakfast or during the day. It is often dipped in milk or in cappuccino at breakfast and eaten warm and wet.

==== Other Ligurian variants ====
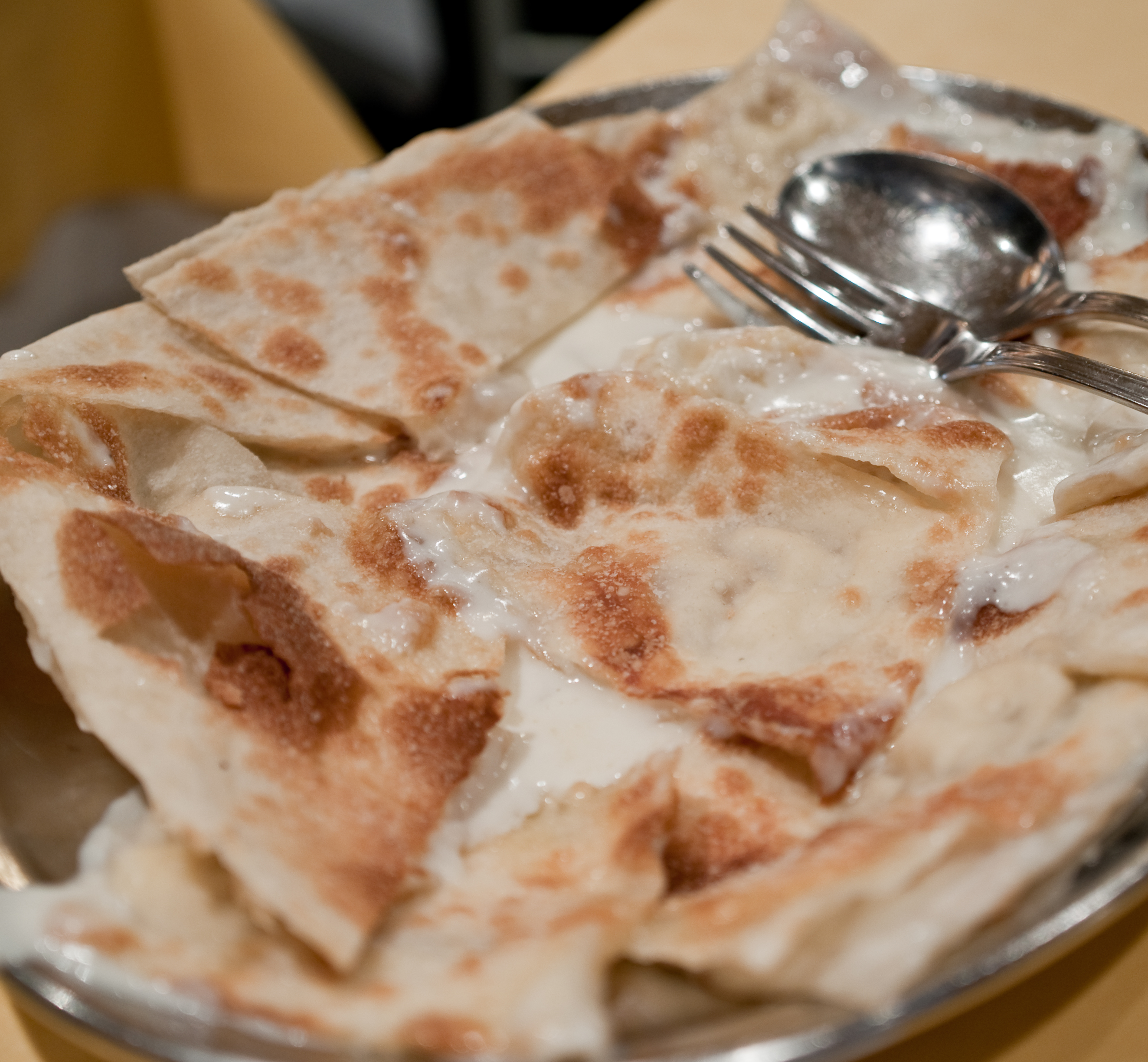
Focaccia col formaggio or focaccia di Recco, a typical variety of focaccia made in Recco

Focaccia has countless variations along the Ligurian coast, from the biscuit-hard focaccia secca (lit. 'dry focaccia') to the corn-flour, oily, soft Voltri version.

An example is focaccia con il formaggio (lit. 'focaccia with cheese'), also called focaccia di Recco or focaccia tipo Recco, which is made in Recco, near Genoa. This version has prescinsêua cheese sandwiched between two layers of paper-thin dough.

=== Other variants ===
In northwest Italy, a popular variant is focaccia dolce (lit. 'sweet focaccia'), which is sprinkled lightly with sugar, and may include raisins or honey. In northeast Italy, focaccia veneta (lit. 'Venetian focaccia') is typical for Easter; it is based on eggs, sugar, and butter. In the city of Rimini, piada dei morti is a sweet focaccia topped with raisins, almonds, walnuts, and pine nuts, and traditionally eaten in November for All Souls' Day.

In the Apulia region, southern Italy, focaccia pugliese ('Puglian focaccia') incorporates potatoes in the dough, and is topped with tomatoes, olives, and fresh herbs, often oregano.

In South Tyrol and the Austrian village of Krimml, Osterfochaz (locally Fochiz) is a traditional Easter gift from godparents to their godchildren. It is made slightly thinner in the centre so that dyed eggs may be placed there.

==== Focaccia al rosmarino ====
Focaccia al rosmarino (lit. 'rosemary focaccia') is topped with rosemary. It may be served as an antipasto, table bread or snack. Whole or sliced fresh rosemary leaves may be used, as can dried rosemary. It may be garnished with sprigs of fresh rosemary, after baking, and sprinkled with salt. Potato rosemary focaccia is sometimes called "potato pizza" in New York City.

Although rosemary is the most common herb used to flavor focaccia, sage is also used, and the variant is called focaccia alla salvia.

Focaccia al rosmarino may have a moist texture, and the exact recipe varies. It may be savory or sweet. It typically is baked, although it is sometimes fried. Garlic or basil may be added. It is sometimes served accompanied with slices of prosciutto. It may be used in the preparation of sandwiches.

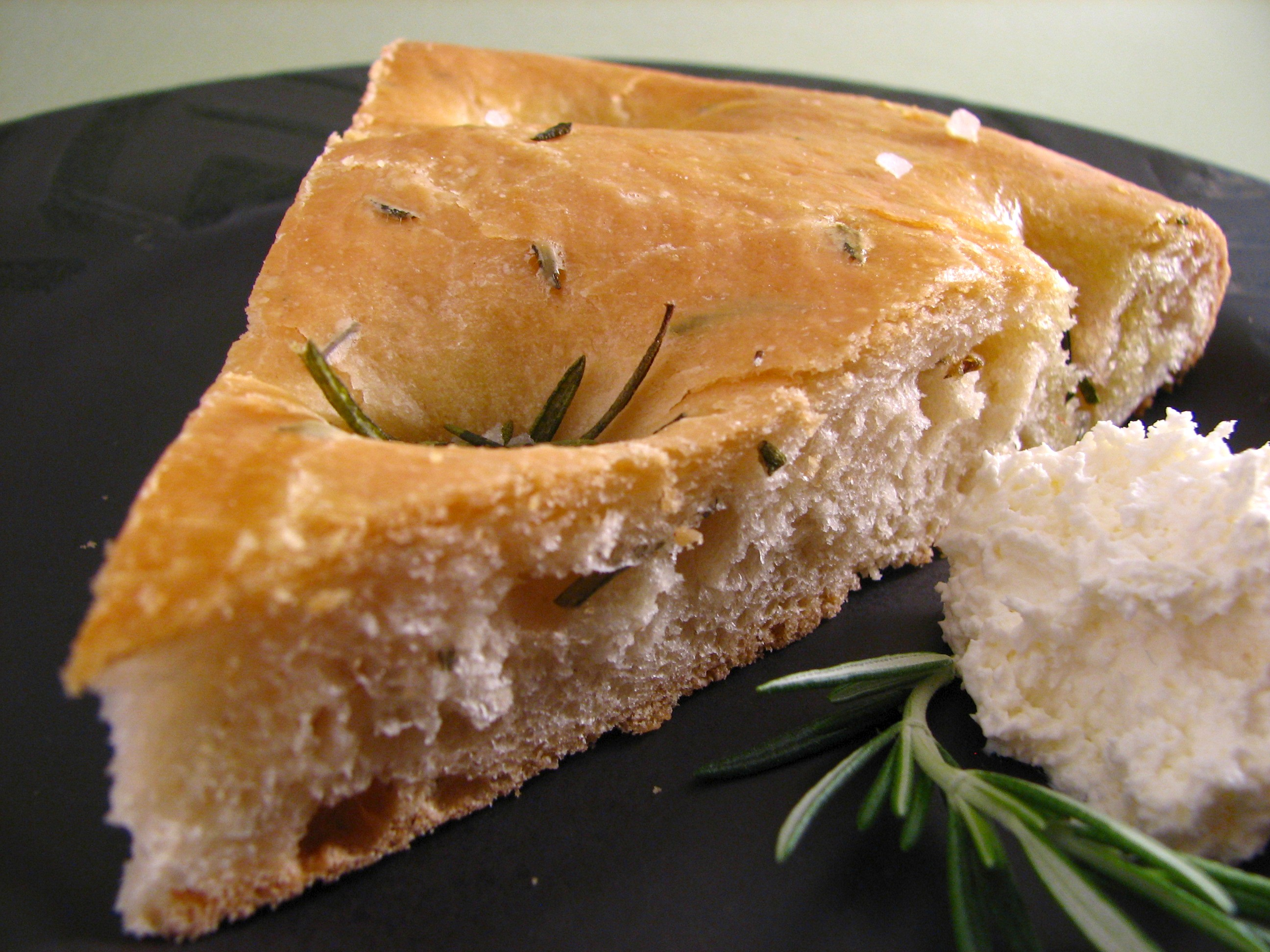
A close-up view of focaccia al rosmarino

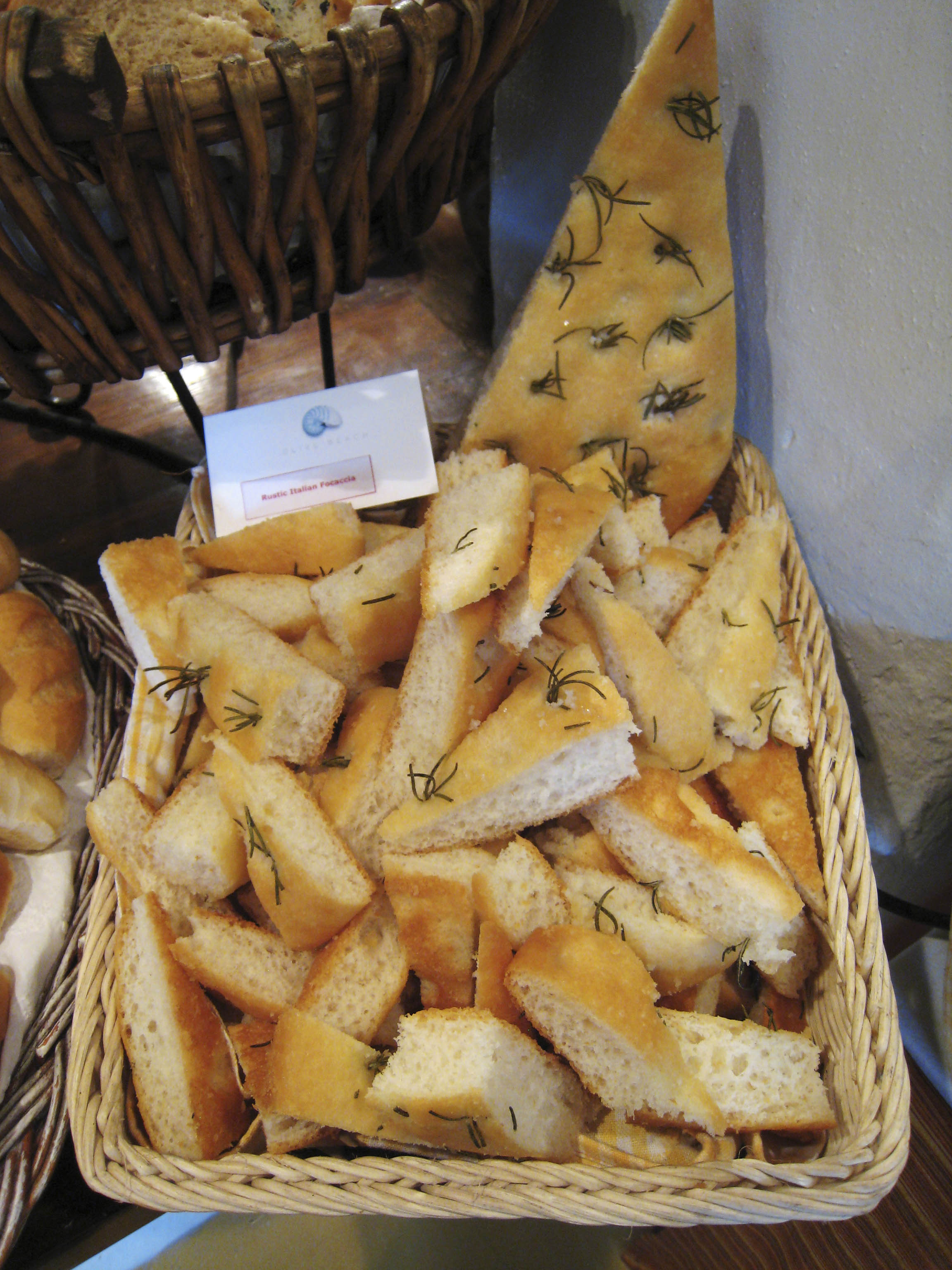
Slices of focaccia al rosmarino

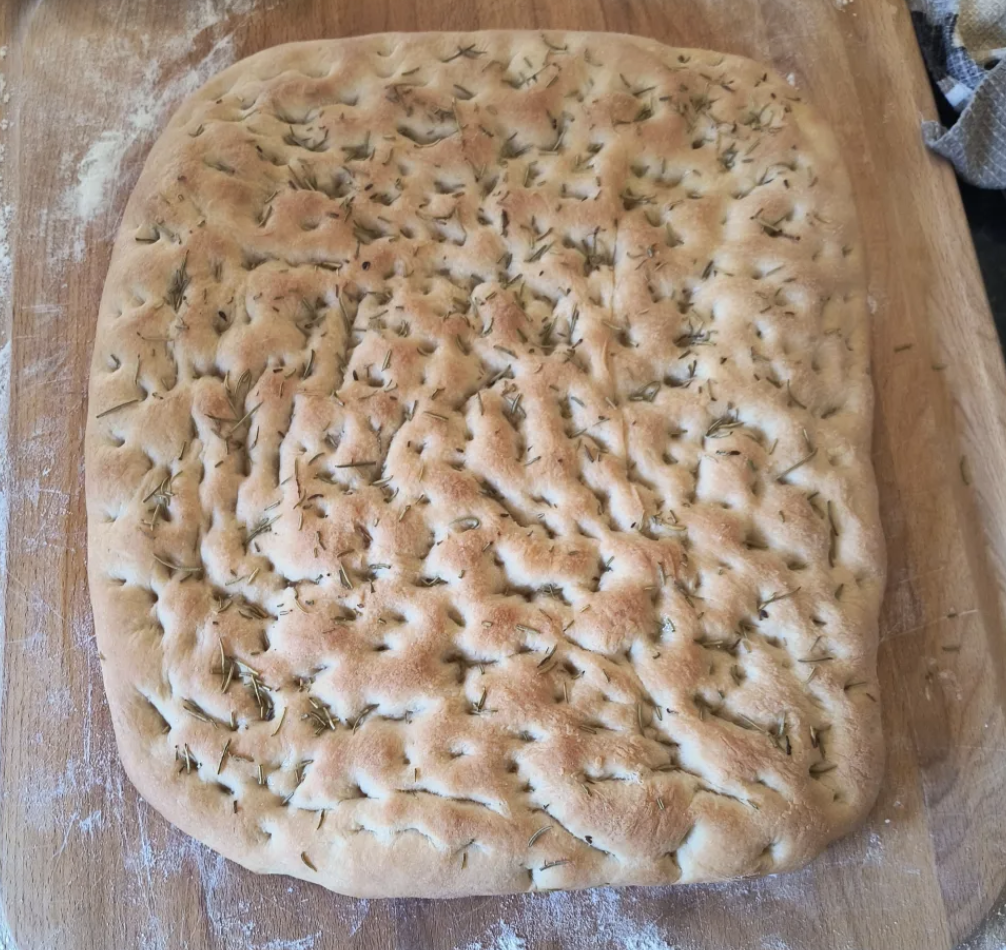
Focaccia al rosmarino with many dimples (ombrisalli in Genoese dialect)

== See also ==
Media related to Focaccia at Wikimedia Commons Focaccia II at the Wikibooks Cookbook subproject

- Cuisine of Liguria
- Fougasse (bread)
