= Cuisine of Basilicata =

Cuisine of the Basilicata region of Italy

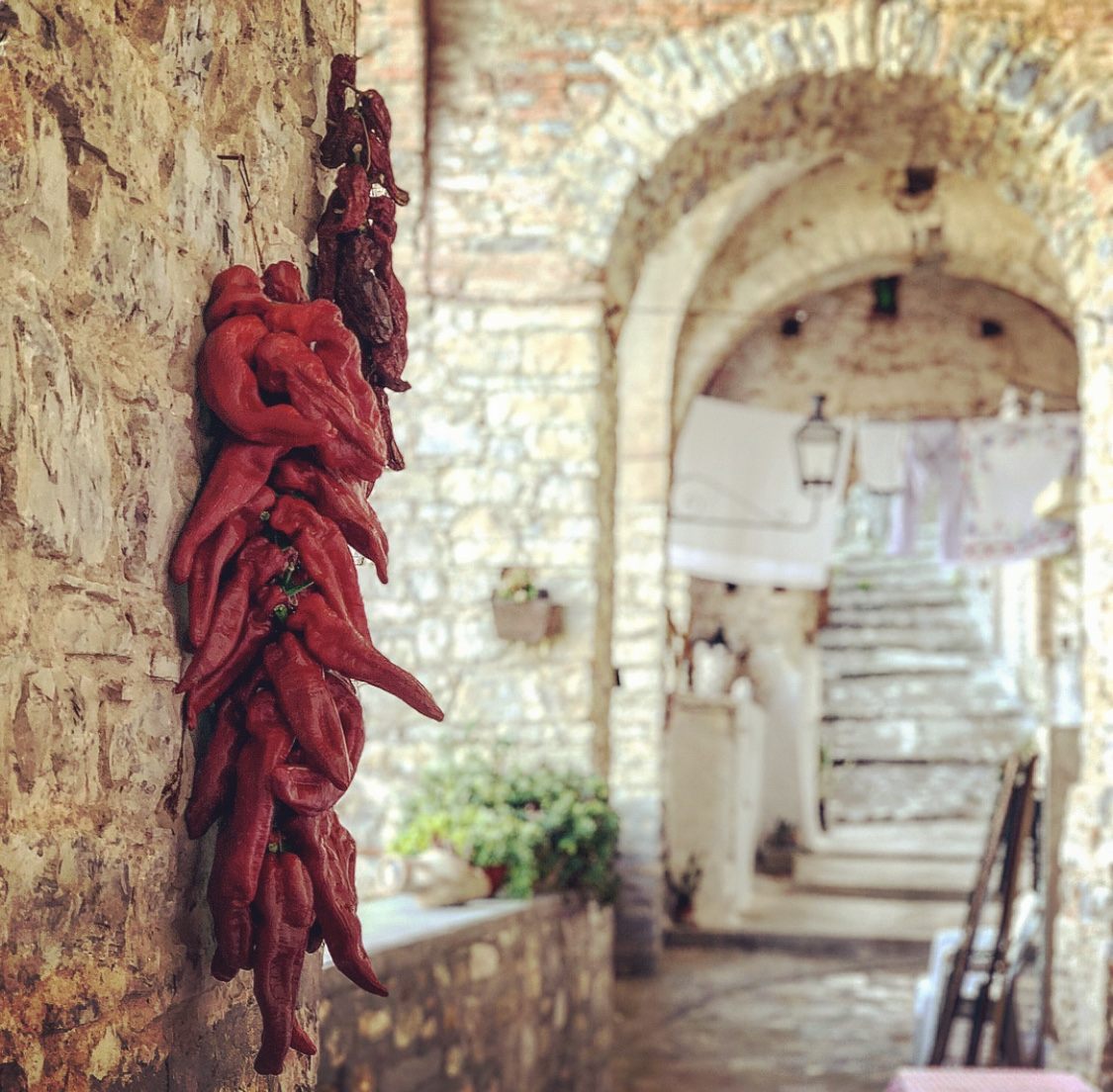
Peperoni cruschi, a variety of dry pepper typical of Lucanical cuisine

The cuisine of Basilicata, or Lucanian cuisine, is the cuisine of the Basilicata region of Italy. It is mainly based on the use of pork and sheep meat, legumes, cereals and vegetables, with the addition of aromas such as hot peppers, powdered raw peppers and horseradish. The local gastronomy is, for historical-cultural reasons, typically peasant, based on simple recipes and on the culture of reuse, in particular of meat and bread.

Some dishes have undergone variations and enrichments in modern times, losing the connotations of "poor" cooking which characterized them in the past. The most ancient manuscript available about Lucanian cooking dates back to 1524, by Antonio Camuria from Lagonegro, cook at the service of the Carafa family.

== Overview ==
The cuisine of Basilicata is mostly based on inexpensive ingredients and deeply anchored in rural traditions.

Pork is an integral part of the regional cuisine, often made into sausages or roasted on a spit. Famous dry sausages from the region are lucanica and soppressata. Wild boar, mutton, and lamb are also popular. Pasta sauces are generally based on meats or vegetables. Horseradish is often used as a spice and condiment, known in the region as "poor man's truffle". The region produces cheeses such as pecorino di Filiano, canestrato di Moliterno, pallone di Gravina, and padraccio and olive oils such as the Vulture. The peperone crusco (lit. 'crusco pepper') is a staple of the local cuisine, defined as the "red gold of Basilicata". It is consumed as a snack or as a main ingredient for several regional recipes.

Among the traditional dishes are pasta con i peperoni cruschi, pasta served with dried crunchy pepper and breadcrumbs; lagane e ceci, also known as piatto del brigante (lit. 'brigand's dish'), pasta prepared with chickpeas and peeled tomatoes; tumact me tulez, tagliatelle-dish of Arbëreshe culture; rafanata, a type of omelet with horseradish; ciaudedda, a vegetable stew with artichokes, potatoes, broad beans, and pancetta; and the baccalà alla lucana, one of the few recipes made with fish. Desserts include taralli dolci, made with sugar glaze and scented with anise and calzoncelli, fried pastries filled with a cream of chestnuts and chocolate.

The most famous wine of the region is the Aglianico del Vulture; others include Matera, Terre dell'Alta Val d'Agri, and Grottino di Roccanova.

Basilicata is also known for its mineral waters which are sold widely in Italy. The springs are mostly located in the volcanic basin of the Vulture area.

== Characteristics ==
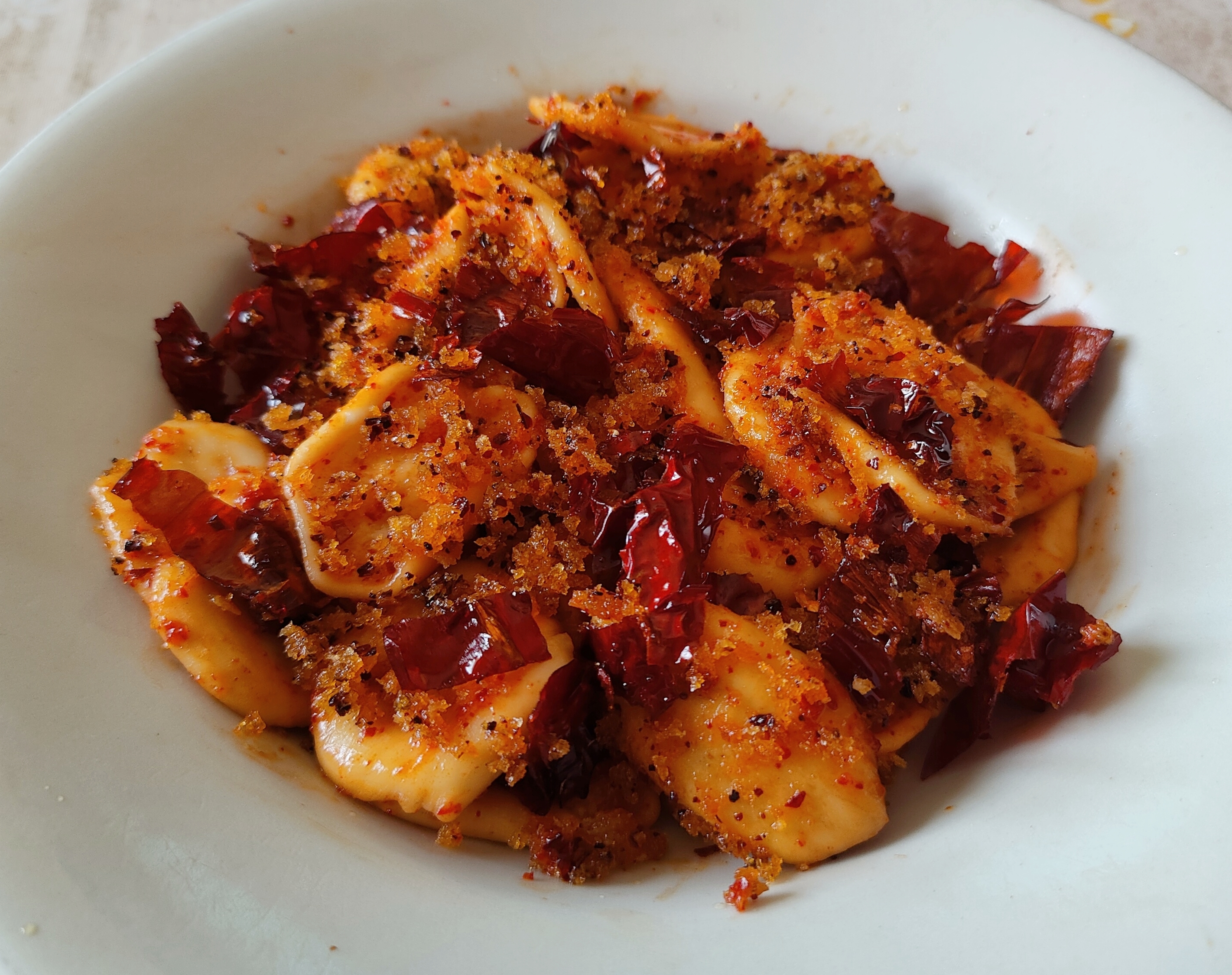
Pasta con i peperoni cruschi

The region is characterized by many small towns, villages and rural centers often separated by geographical barriers, therefore determining the necessity of cooking and eating what was produced on the spot, according to techniques developed on the spot. The most common recipes, passing from an area to another, from a village to another take on different connotations, and are made with different raw materials.

Pork has been a fundamental ingredient of Lucanian cooking since ancient Roman times. According to Marcus Terentius Varro, in ancient Lucania (which included most of today's Basilicata) originated the sausage, at the time called lucanica, which spread, later, in the whole national territory and from which originated the luganega, typical sausage of northern Italy.

Little used fish in the hinterland and only widespread in the limited Tyrrhenian and Ionic coasts. In the past, salt cod was the most common variety in inland areas because of its long shelf life.

Among the most used legumes and cereals there are beans, chickpeas, chickling peas, broad beans, barley and spelt, which are widely used in different recipes such as crapiata and ciaudedda; and used for the production of mischiglio, a mixture of flours dating back to the sixteenth century, used for the preparation of dishes served on the tables of counts, barons, marquises and landowners of Basilicata.

Fruit has always represented an essential component. Figs, in particular, were considered a versatile food: consumed both in holidays and in the most intense working periods such as harvesting. Grapes, besides the production of wines, have a culinary use in the preparation of first courses (lagana chiapputa) and desserts such as pan minisc. Dried fruits, such as chestnuts, are used in many ways in first and second courses, as well as in sweets such as calzoncelli.

Peperone crusco, a variety of dried bell pepper, is a key element of the regional cooking, so much to be labeled as "the red gold of Basilicata". It is consumed both as a snack and in the preparation of first courses, second courses and appetisers, such as pasta con i peperoni cruschi, baccalà alla Lucana (salt cod) and acquasale. A very used aromatic element is horseradish, defined by people from Basilicata as "poor man's truffle", historically common on the tables of labourers because of its accessible costs and its wide spreading in the territory. Horseradish is a fundamental ingredient of condiments such as ndruppeche, main courses such as rafanata or by mixing it with bread and potatoes to prepare meatballs, as well as to flavor meat.

A condiment frequently found in Lucanian dishes is breadcrumbs which was considered the "poor man's cheese", representing an alternative to more expensive dairy products.

Ancient is the art of calzone, known in Basilicata with different names such as pastizz or falagone, datable at least between the eighteenth and nineteenth century.

== Pasta dishes ==
Basilicata is considered the region with the highest consumption of pasta. The figures reach 42 kg (93 lb) per capita per year, compared to the national average of 24 kg (53 lb). Typical pasta formats of the region are strascinati, cavatelli (also known as rascatielli), ferretti (also known as ferricelli, fusilli or frizzuli), orecchiette, maccaronara, lagane (not to be confused with lagane, better known as "lasagne"), an ancient pasta format dating back to Roman times, similar to tagliatelle but slightly shorter and thicker, and manate, a long pasta rather thick and irregularly shaped.

Some notable pasta dishes are:

| Name | Image | Description |
|---|---|---|
| Calzoni di pezzente e fagioli | | pasta stuffed with pezzente salami and cooked ham, seasoned with beans, pecorino cheese and parsley. |
| Cavatelli o strascinati con cime di zucca | | pasta served with pumpkin tops, crusco peppers and tomatoes. |
| Cavatelli con cime di rapa or senàpe selvatiche | | pasta seasoned with vegetables and garlic. A variant foresees the addition of tomato and pecorino cheese. |
| Cauzunciedd | | ravioli filled with ricotta cheese, eggs and mint, seasoned with tomato sauce. |
| Ferrett' cu pezzent e rafano | | pasta seasoned with a sauce of salami pezzente and horseradish, with the addition of cacioricotta cheese or grated pecorino cheese. |
| Lagane e ceci | | pasta with chickpeas, garlic or leek and laurel. They are also called "piatto del brigante" (dish of the brigand) because it is said that they were very appreciated by the Lucanian brigands of the nineteenth century who were, therefore, called "scolalagane". |
| Lagana chiapputa | | lagh' na chiappout in dialect. Typical of the municipalities of Alto Bradano. Pasta seasoned with cooked wine, walnuts, almonds, pine nuts and raisins. |
| Orecchiette alla materana | | baked pasta with tomato, minced lamb, mozzarella and pecorino cheese. |
| Pasta con fagiolini e cacioricotta | | typical recipe from Bernalda, with green beans from the eye and tomato puree. |
| Pasta con peperoni cruschi | | first course with cruschi peppers, bread crumbs and cacioricotta cheese. Types of pasta used are strascinati, frizzuli and cavatelli. |
| Pasta con ragù alla potentina | | generally strozzapreti or strascinati served with l'ndruppeche, ragout prepared with pork and beef meat and seasoned with grated horseradish. |
| Pasta mollicata | | known in dialect as pasta ammuddicata or pasta ca muddica, is present in many culinary traditions of Southern Italy. In Basilicata it is prepared with breadcrumbs and with the addition of other seasonings such as chopped tomatoes or meat sauce, powdered crusco bell pepper or acciughe sotto sale. |
| Strascinati con la menta | | typical pasta dish of Tito with chopped mint, lard, crusco bell pepper and horseradish. |
| Timballo di riso al forno | | topped with provola cheese, sausage, chicken livers, bread crumbs, pecorino cheese and tomato sauce. |
| Tumact me tulez | | dish of the arbëreshë lucana tradition typical of Barile; tagliatelle with tomatoes and anchovies, seasoned with breadcrumbs and nut grains. |

== Secondi ==
Ingredients which stand out in Lucanian second courses are pork and sheep meat, with some exceptions of chicken and fish. Among these are to be mentioned:

| Name | Image | Description |
|---|---|---|
| Agnello alla contadina | | lamb cut into pieces with potatoes cooked in the oven. |
| Anguilla di Pantano | | eel served with tomatoes and chili pepper, flavored with bay leaf and mint. |
| Baccalà alla potentina | | also called baccalà a ciauredda. Dish based on fish with different variations. Generally seasoned with tomato puree, onion, black olives and raisins. |
| Baccalà alla lucana or Baccalà all'aviglianese | | seasoned with cruschi peppers. |
| Brodetto | | 'Vredett in dialect. Lamb meat with wild fennel, eggs, pecorino cheese and tomato (optional). |
| Cappucci e cicorie | | second course that combines vegetables with pork rind and pig's foot. |
| Cutturidd | | also known as Pastorale or Pignata, sheep meat stew with different ingredients and variations such as tomatoes, potatoes, lampascioni and cardoncelli. |
| Frascatula | | cornmeal polenta with potato and lard prepared in different versions, usually with pork sauce or cooked wine. |
| Gnummeriedde | | widespread in all of central-southern Italy. Also known with other names such as Gnommariell or Migliatiedde, they are entrails of lamb or kid twisted and seasoned with different aromas according to the area. |
| Grattonato or Trippa risottata | | typical of the Pollino area, made with offal of sheep (bovine in the most recent version), eggs, pecorino cheese and powdered bell pepper. |
| Maiale con cipolle | | pork with onions and dry white wine. |
| Pollo alla potentina | | prepared with tomato, onion, potatoes, lard and fresh chilli pepper. |
| Pollo ripieno al ragù | | chicken giblets stuffed with breadcrumbs and sausage, seasoned with pecorino cheese and tomato puree. |
| Rafanata | | high baked omelette flavored with horseradish and pecorino cheese, boiled potatoes and/or sausages can be added. |
| Sarde con origano e pane | | sardines seasoned with grated bread crumbs, pecorino cheese, oregano, parsley and garlic. |
| Spigola alla malvasia lucana | | fish dish with malvasia, seasoned with grapes, orange and lemon peel, thyme, rosemary and garlic. |
| Zucca lunga sposata | | in dialect Cocuzza logna maritata. Pumpkin seasoned with a sauce of tomatoes, onions and celery. |

== Other dishes ==
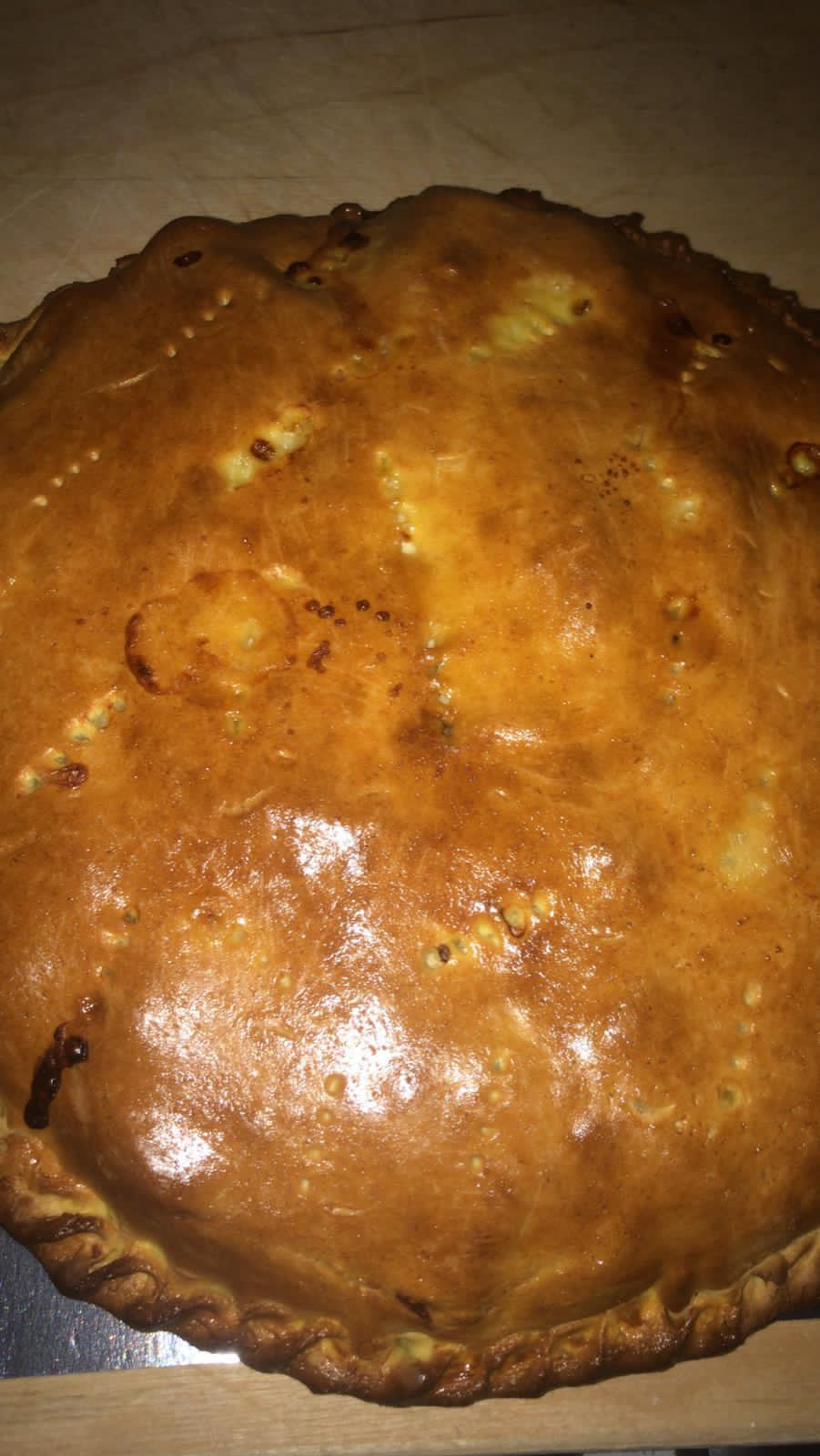
Pizza rustica lucana

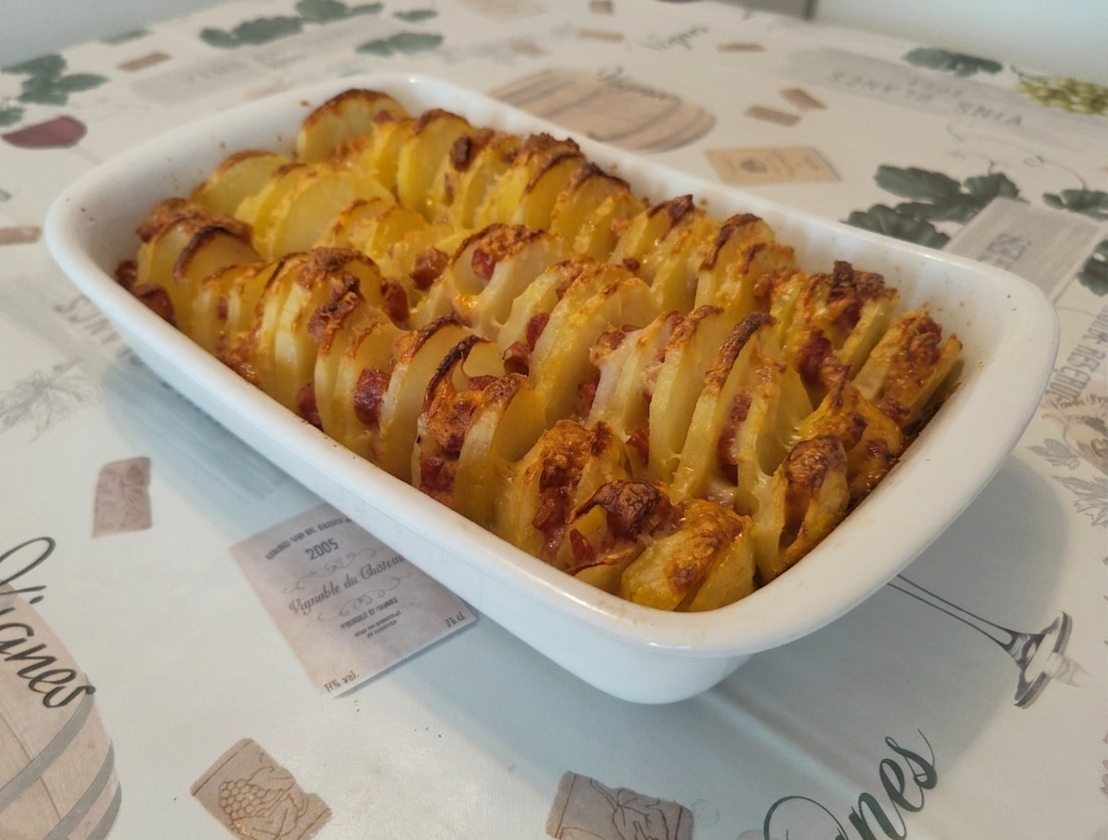
Patate piene

- Acquasale: a unique dish with several variations, all with stale bread as a basic ingredient. It can be enriched with egg, tomato, onion, raw peppers.
- Cialledda: similar to acquasale and widespread in the area of Matera. It is prepared with bread, onion and tomato.
- Crapiata: typical soup from Matera with various ingredients such as peas, broad beans, chickpeas, wheat, spelt, lentils, beans, chickling peas, new potatoes, cherry tomatoes, celery, onion and carrot.
- Cuccìa: widespread in the area of the Lucanian Dolomites, peasant soup with wheat, chickpeas, broad beans, chickling peas.
- Falagone: in dialect Falaòn. A type of calzone prepared with an unleavened dough. The filling can be salty or sweet depending on the place of production.
- Patate piene: also known as patat' chiene or patat' abbrazzat, typical recipe of Laurenzana, therefore called "patate alla laurenzanese" (patat' alla runzanese). Baked potatoes cut into slices and stuffed with seasoned sausage, cheese and eggs. You can also add breadcrumbs and horseradish.
- Munnulata: typical soup of Castelsaraceno, prepared with chestnuts, beans, potatoes and crusco bell pepper powder.
- Pane cotto (or pan cotto): prepared with bread, potatoes, guanciale or pancetta. Another version common in the Vulture-Melfese area is made with bread, broccoli or turnip tops and cruschi peppers.
- Pizza rustica lucana: known with different names such as scarcedda, pasticcio, cazzola or cuzzola, it is a savory pie of the Easter period with a filling of eggs, ricotta (or toma), pecorino and soppressata (or sausage).
- U' pastizz rtunnar: known simply as pastizz (not to be confused with the aforementioned savory pie), typical calzone of Rotondella, stuffed with pork, egg and grated cheese.

== Side dishes ==
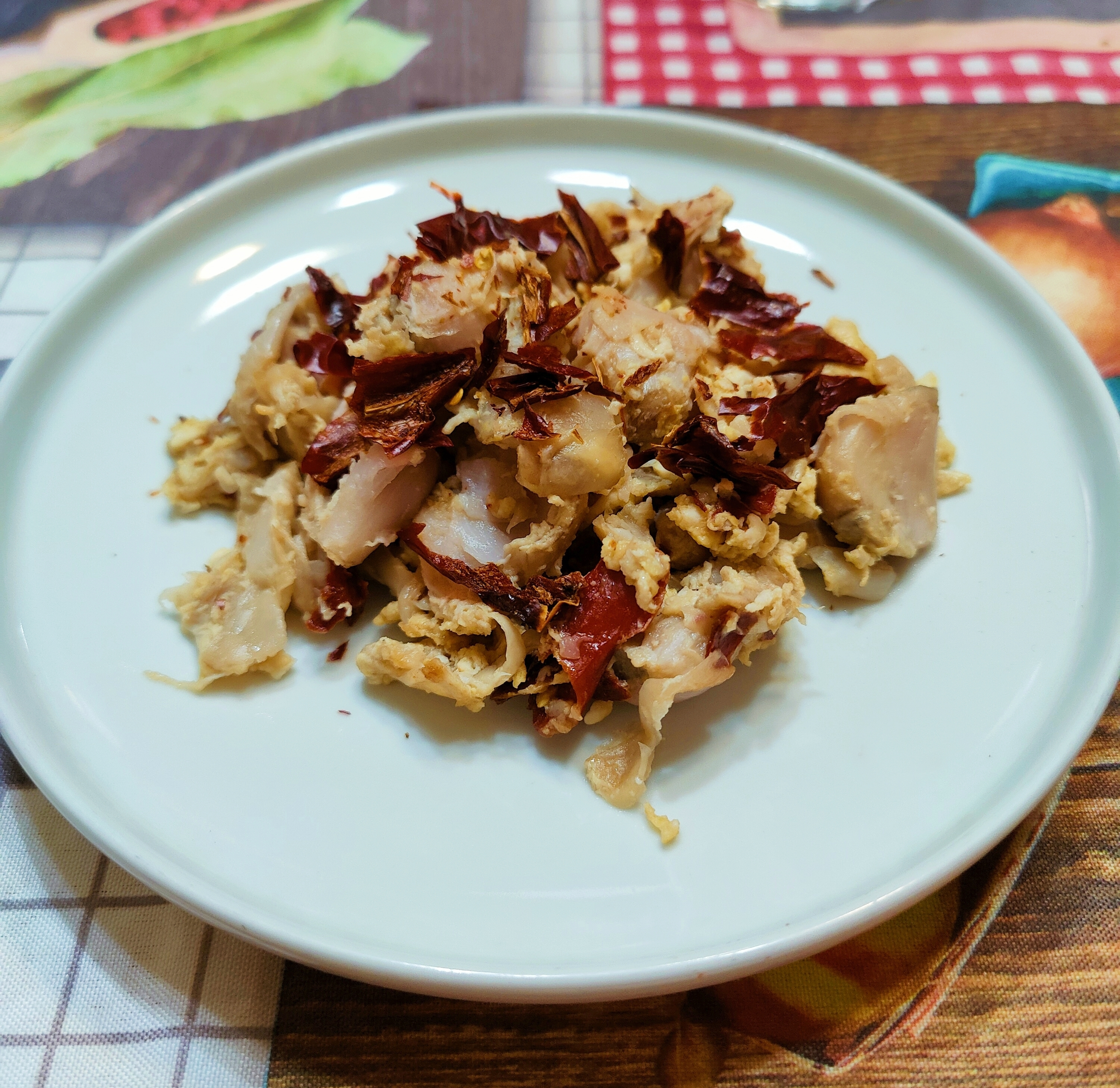
Lampascioni, egg and cruschi peppers salad

- Ciambotta lucana: vegetable side dish with eggplants, peppers, onions, potatoes and tomatoes.
- Ciaudedda: side dish made of potatoes, artichokes, onions and bacon.
- Lampascioni salad: there are many variations throughout the region. Additional ingredients include scrambled eggs, crusco or chili peppers, bread crumbs, sausage or tomato.
- Patate raganate: baked potatoes with tomatoes, onions and bread crumbs.
- Patatelle: typical dish of Viggiano and Brienza; fried potato balls with cheese seasoned with chicken broth or tomato sauce.
- Zafaran chin: baked peppers with a filling of breadcrumbs, anchovies and garlic.

== Bread ==
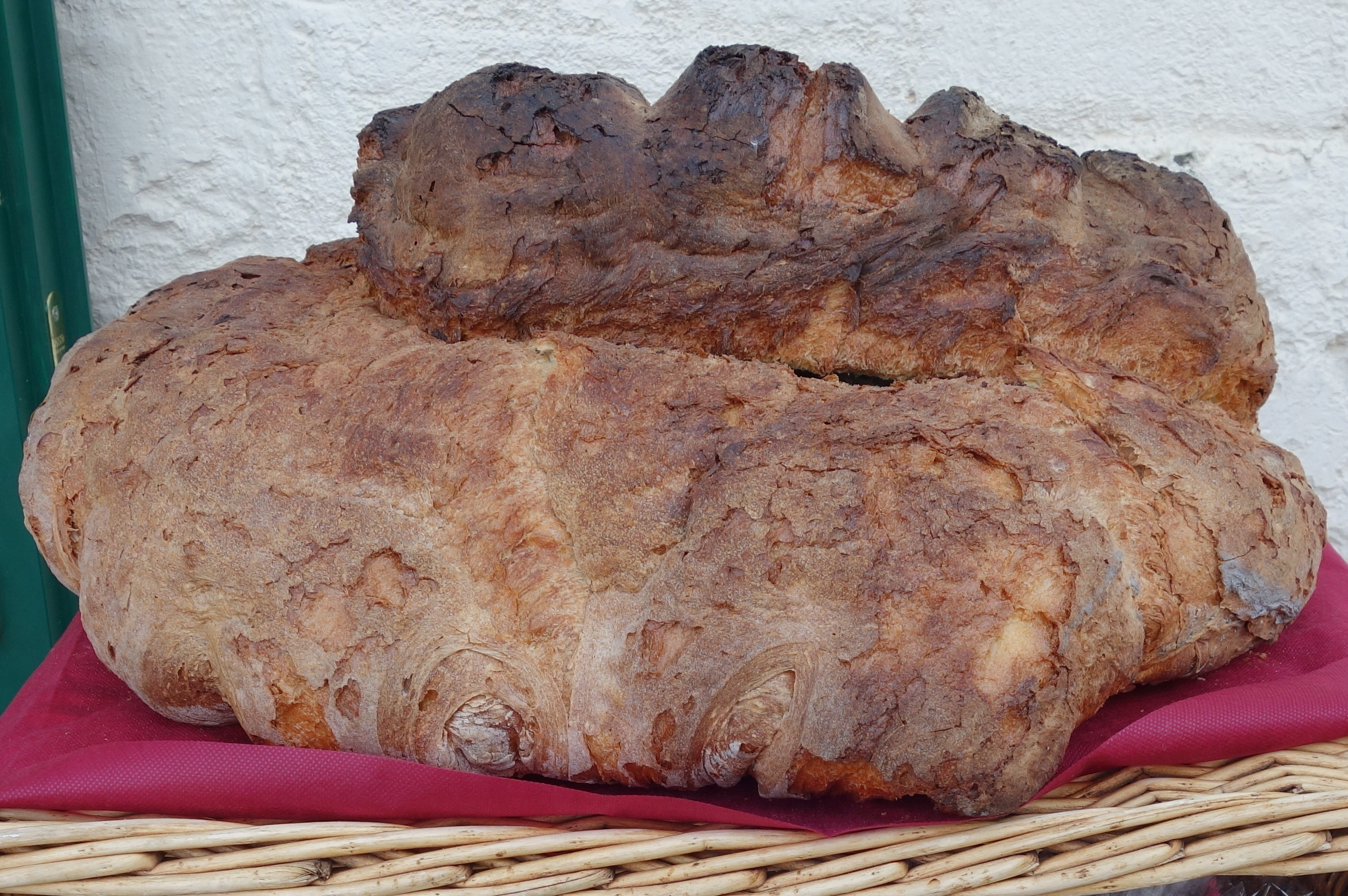
Pane di Matera

Among the most famous bakery products offered by the region there is Matera bread, certified I.G.P. Other types of bread to be mentioned are Trecchina bread and San Severino Lucano potato bread, both recognized as traditional food products.

Among the focaccias there are the strazzata, a variety with pepper; the carchiola, an unleavened corn focaccia cooked in a fireplace, both typical of Avigliano; focaccia with powdered crusco bell pepper and focaccia with honey. Other bakery products are friselle and taralli, as well as those of arbëreshë origin such as cugliaccio (kulac), a sweet linked to weddings and Easter festivities; and petulla Shën Paljit, a thin crepe with a savory taste stuffed with cheese and cold cuts.

Like other Italian regions, Basilicata also has its own version of Easter bread, which has many variations and different names such as picciddat and piccilatiedd. Other products of the Easter period are ficazzola (f'cazzol), panierino (u' panaridd) and bambolina (a' pipua), typical of Oliveto Lucano.

== Oils ==
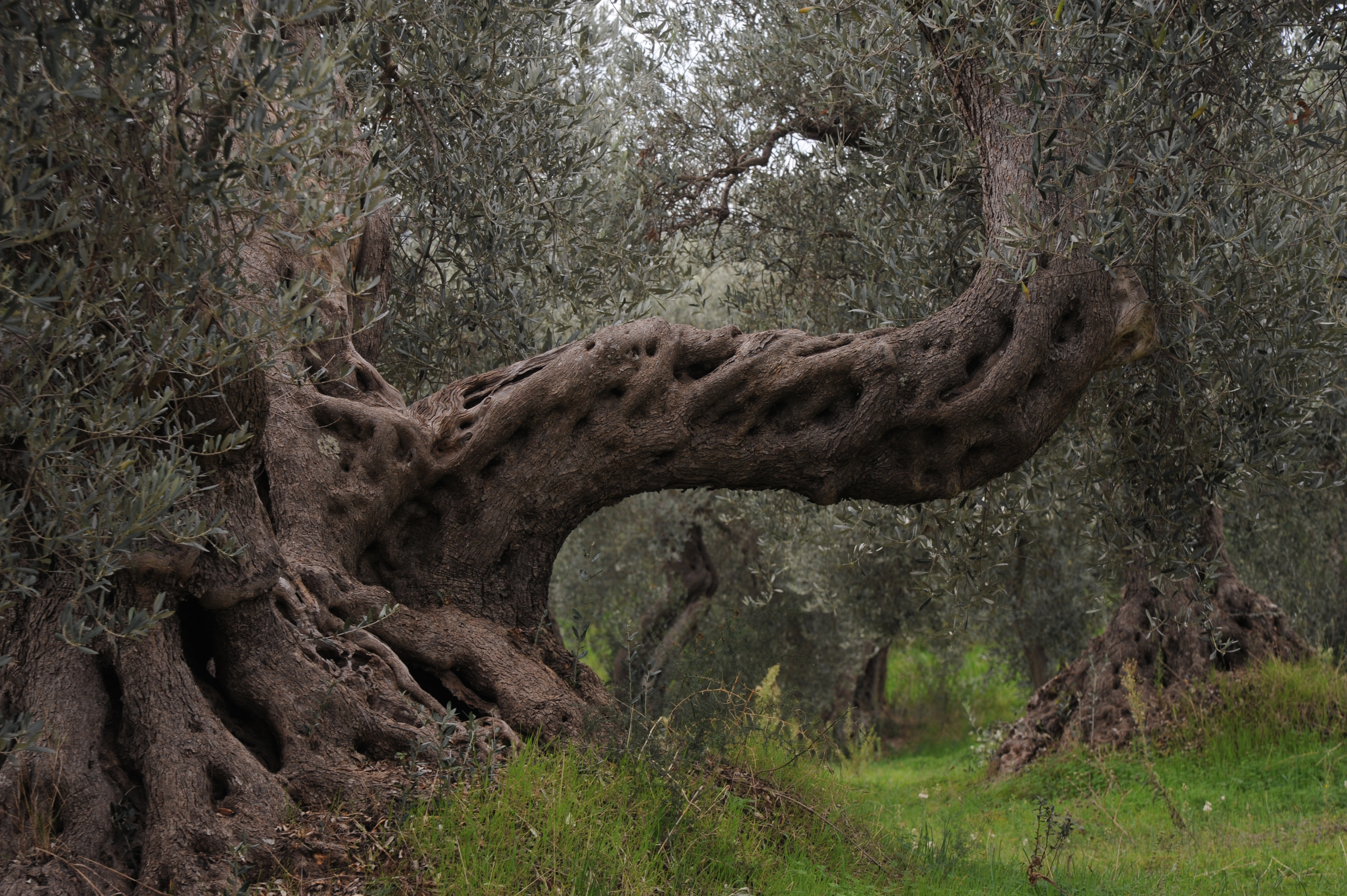
Olive tree in Ferrandina

In the cuisine of Basilicata, an important and essential element is the oil, present in almost all regional dishes. In fact, in Basilicata, the olive tree covers over 85% of the cultivated area. The areas with higher production are Vulture-Melfese, low Val d'Agri and low Collina materana.

The most common quality of olives in this region is the Ogliarola del Vulture (also called Ogliarola di Melfi or Rapollese) and Majatica di Ferrandina. The oil produced is mainly extra-virgin olive oil, but virgin olive oil is also produced. The predominant color of the oil is golden yellow with green reflections.

- Olio di oliva Vulture
- Olio di oliva "Majatica" di Ferrandina

== Cold cuts ==
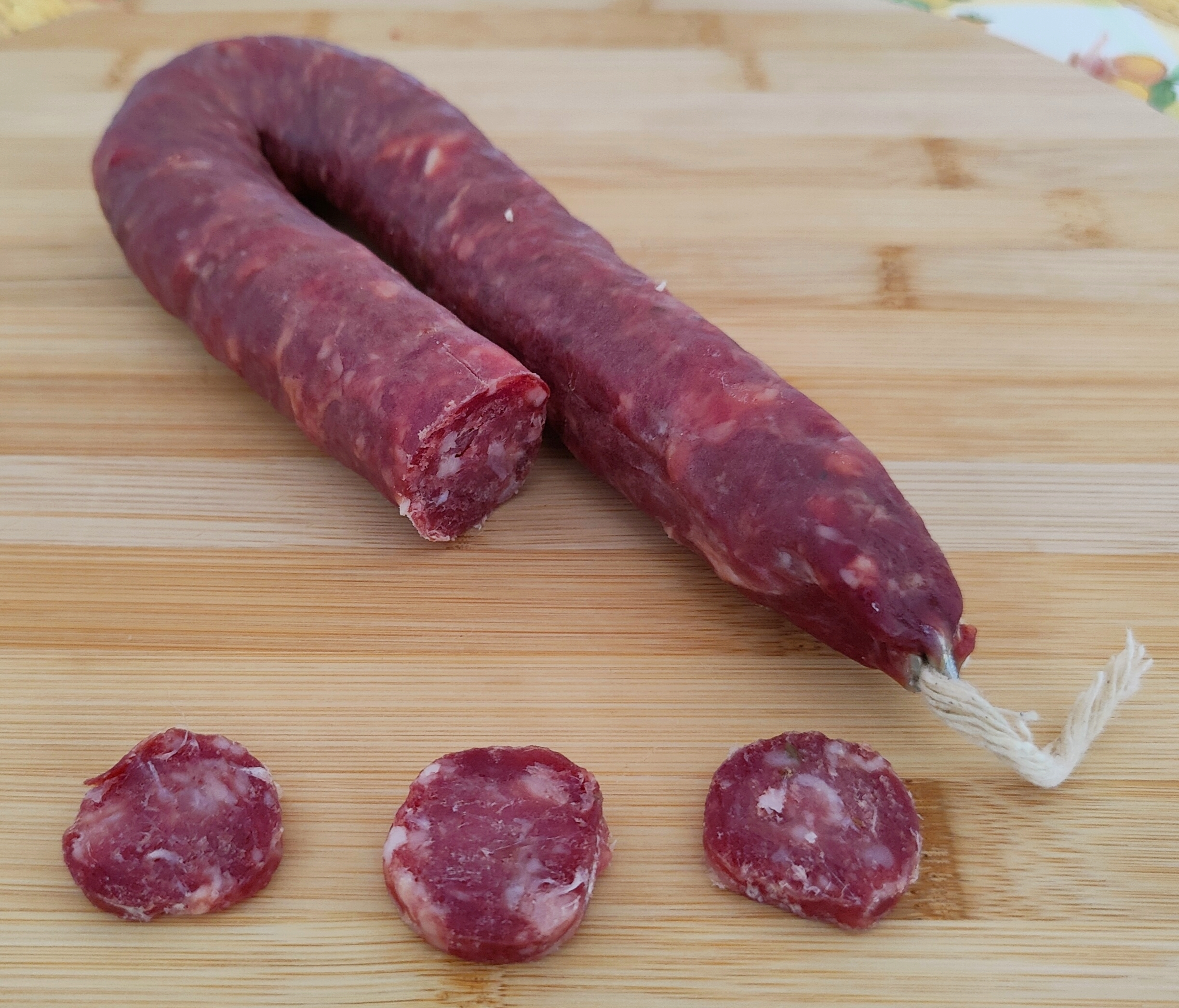
Lucanica di Picerno

Typical pork cold cuts are:

- salsiccia
- salame pezzente
- soppressata
- capocollo
- pancetta

Picerno is the undisputed pole in this sector, producing about 50% of Lucanian cold cuts. Typical regional cold cuts are the lucanica di Picerno, the chain sausage of Cancellara and the nuglia di Laurenzana. In Tricarico are typical products derived from black pig. Pork is also used to produce lard and sanguinaccio dolce. Wild boar is also used for the production of sausages and of borzillo (U' burzill), a spreadable sausage with sweet bell pepper paste, typical of Pietragalla.

== Cheese ==
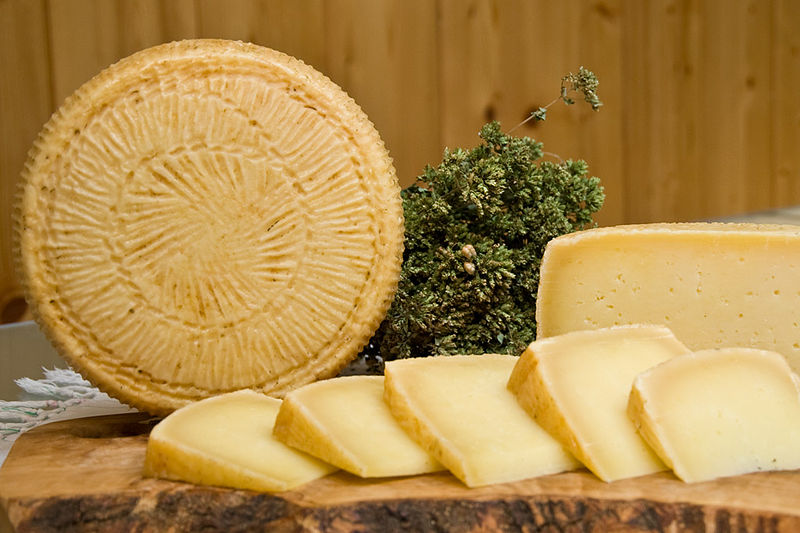
Pecorino di Filiano

Traditional cheeses from Basilicata are:

- ricotta
- cacioricotta
- caprino
- manteca
- pecorino
- caciocavallo
- scamorza

Among the most famous types are pecorino di Filiano, canestrato di Moliterno, padraccio, toma and treccia dura (or treccione), the latter defined as "cheese of Basilicata" since it belongs to the cheese-making tradition of Basilicata, as stated in "La statistica del Regno di Napoli" (lit. 'Statistics of the Kingdom of Naples') of 1811.

== Fruits, vegetables, and beans ==
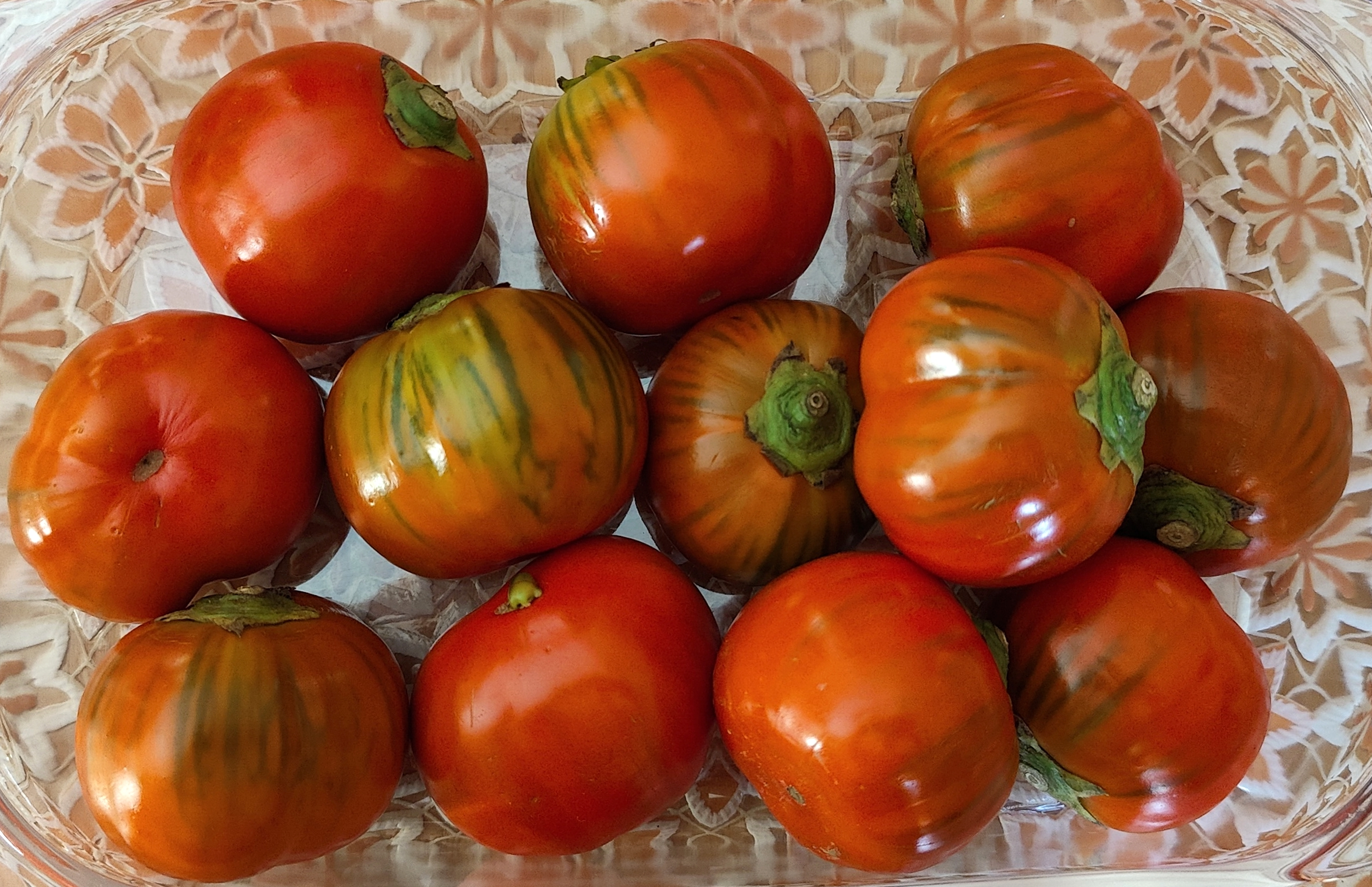
Melanzana rossa di Rotonda

Typical fruits of the region are Pear Lady of Sinni Valley, Pink Fig of Pisticci, strawberries "Sabrosa" and "Candonga", and orange Staccia of Metapontino. Common types of dried fruits are almonds, pistachios (the ones from Stigliano are well known) and chestnuts, in particular those of Vulture such as the marroncino of Melfi which are a central ingredient of first and second courses, desserts, liqueurs and sought after by the processing industries for the preparation of marron glacé.

Among fruit and vegetables are to be mentioned the Peperone di Senise, the Melanzana Rossa di Rotonda and the Pomodoro Ciettaicale di Tolve. Legumes are widely used, such as beans (in particular the Sarconi bean, but also the ones from Rotonda, Muro Lucano and Rivello), chickpeas from Latronico, and lentils from Potenza.

== Desserts ==
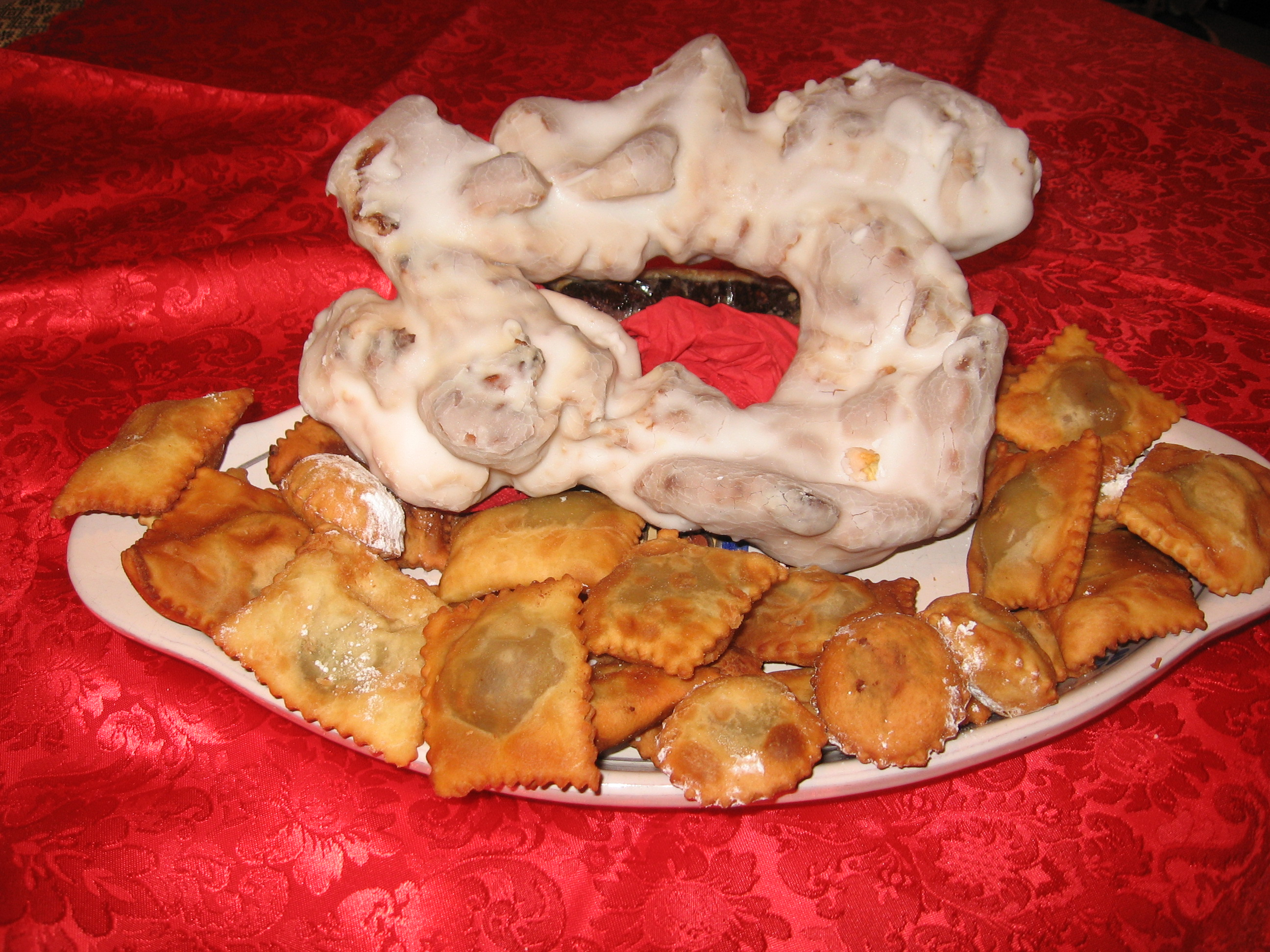
Tarallo glassato and calzoncelli

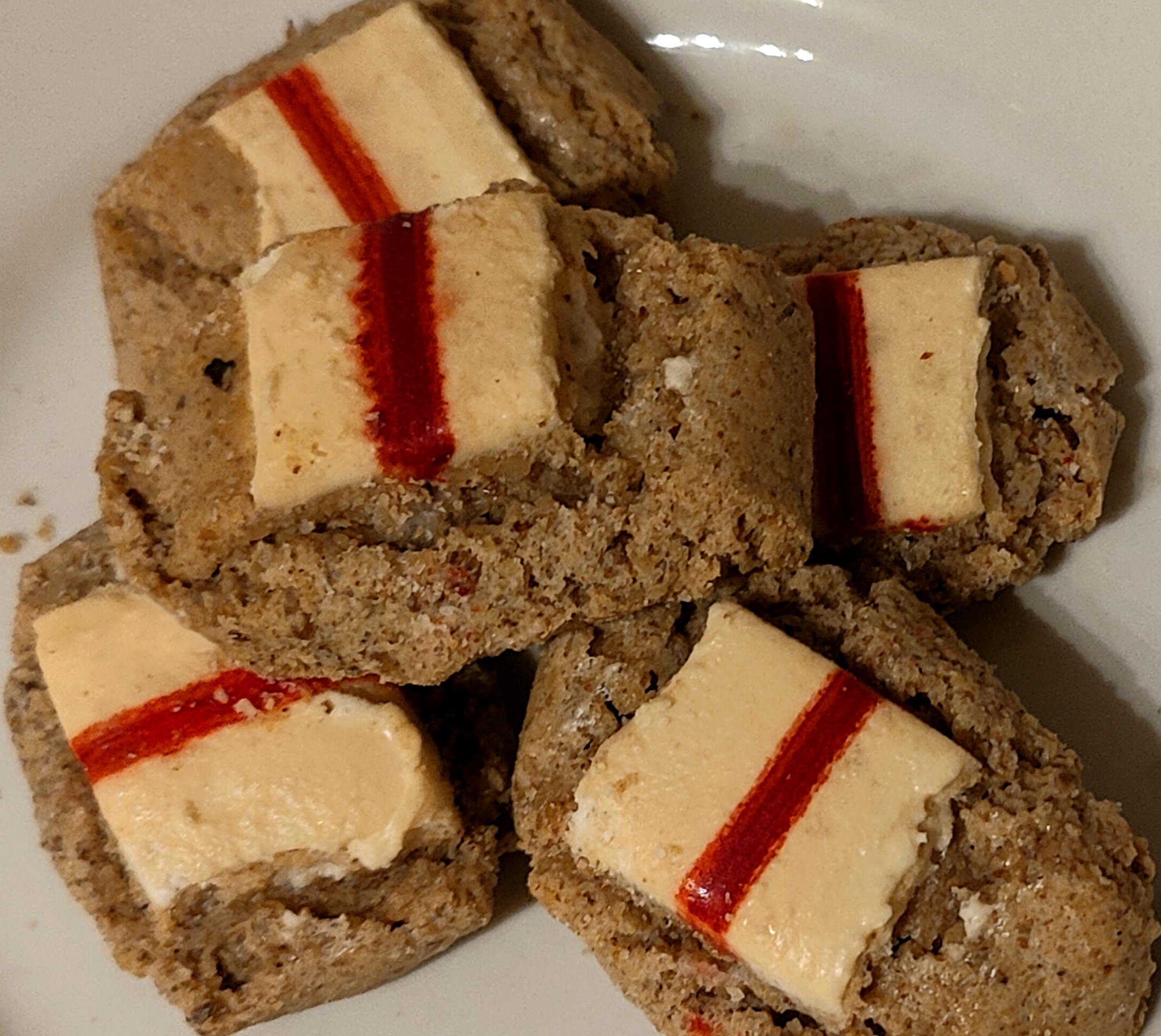
Nocetti

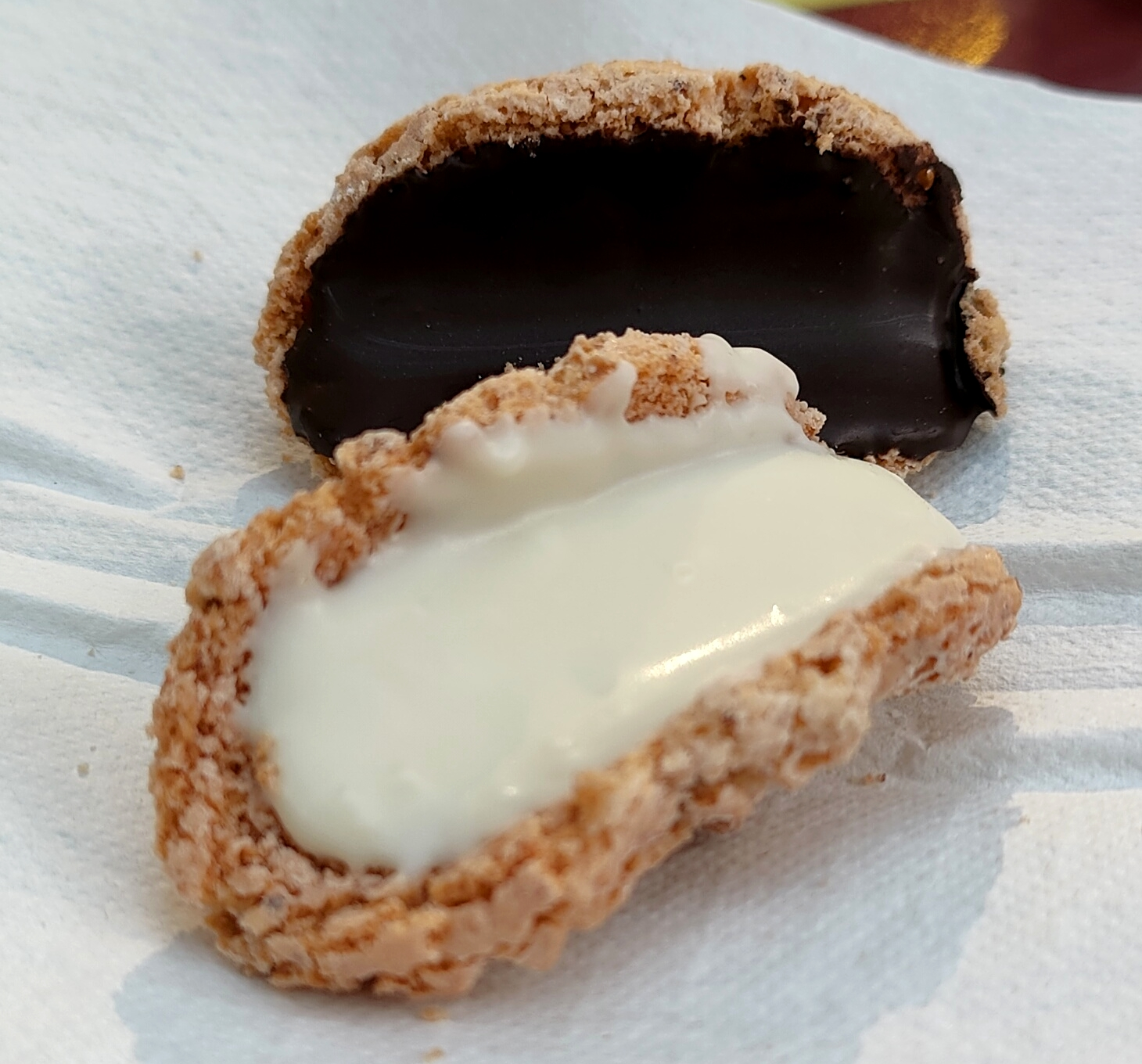
Scorzette

The confectionery tradition is, for the most part, simple and not very elaborated, based on easily available ingredients that the land offered. The products are, mainly, dry and of small dimensions, which allowed an easy transport and an easy consumption to the laborers during the working activities. Among typical sweets there are:

- Anginetti: glazed cookies in the shape of a doughnut, flavored with aniseed or finochietto seeds. Known those of Lauria and recognized as a traditional regional food product.
- Bocconotti: typical of central and southern Italy. In Basilicata they have a filling of black cherry jam (or oranges) or custard.
- Calzoncelli: also known as panzerotti, chinulidd', cauzncidd (not to be confused with first course). Variety of sweet ravioli fried or baked with different fillings depending on the place of production, generally made with chestnuts and cocoa.
- Cannaricoli: sweets typical of Pollino area, prepared with flour, oil (or lard), lemon juice and white wine.
- Cicerata: Christmas cake of central-southern Italy with different names. They are balls of fried dough arranged in a pyramid and covered with honey.
- Nocetti: sweets made with eggs, sugar and nuts, decorated with a lemon glaze. Typical of Trecchina and Maratea.
- Pan minisc' (or Paparotta): typical sweet of the province of Potenza; made of cooked must, flour, sugar and spices.
- Pastarelle: milk cookies with a simple preparation. They can be decorated with codette.
- Pesche grigliate con gelato: peaches marinated in white wine and mint roasted, served with ice cream, raspberry sauce and almond flakes.
- Rosacatarre: also known as scarteddate or crispedde. Fried sweets in the shape of a rose, covered with honey.
- Scorzette: typical sweets of Bernalda, prepared with egg white, sugar, hazelnuts and covered with dark chocolate. A variation replaces hazelnuts and dark chocolate with almonds and white chocolate.
- Soppressata di fichi: typical of Carbone with figs, almonds, walnuts and orange peel.
- Spumette: soft cookies from Matera made with chopped almonds. In the Potentino area they are known as Spumini and have walnuts instead of almonds; those of Cersosimo are certified as traditional food products.
- Strazzate: Strazzet in materanese. Christmas sweet with toasted and chopped almonds, cocoa powder, cinnamon and grated lemon.
- Stozze: dry cookies with almonds, similar to Tuscan cantucci.
- Taralli glassati: similar to anginetti, but larger in size and with irregular shapes, in particular those from Avigliano. A variant without glaze are the ficculi.
- Sospiri (or bride's cakes): They are oval shaped sponge cakes, filled with custard or cocoa, and covered with icing. In Stigliano they are also known as sweets without a name.
- Zeppole di San Giuseppe: sweets of the southern tradition. Fried pastries (or, rarely, baked) made with eggs, flour and sugar, garnished with custard and black cherries in syrup.

== Wines, liquors and drinks ==
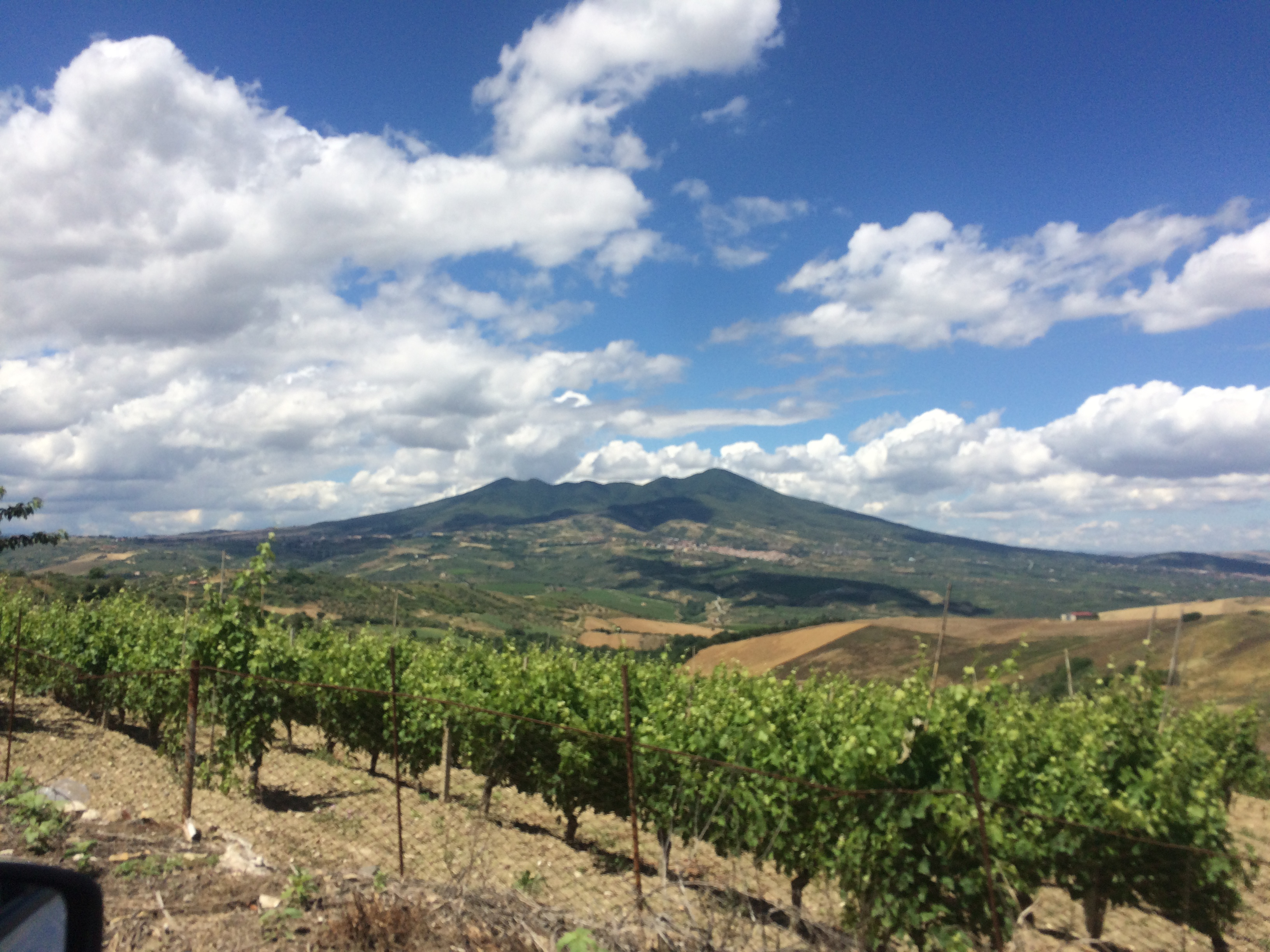
Aglianico vineyard with Mount Vulture in the background

Basilicata is one of the most ancient regions of Italy having a viticultural vocation; at the end of the XX century, 154 different cultivar denominations were registered in the municipalities of Basilicata. Vines cultivated are mainly black berried. Among the most relevant wines there are Aglianico del Vulture, Grottino di Roccanova, Matera and Terre dell'Alta Val d'Agri. White wines are also produced, even though to a lesser extent, from greco and Malvasia, in particular in Vulture and Metapontino.

Typical spirits are Amaro Lucano from Pisticci, elderberry liqueur from Chiaromonte and Sempre Freddo from Avigliano, made of Aglianico and black cherry; other types produced are nocino, fragolino, limoncello cream, citron and orange liqueurs. Among beverages there is Birra Morena, produced in Balvano, and the soft drink Avena from Potenza.

Mineral waters in Basilicata represent the largest reservoir in Italy, amounting to more than 30% of the national water resources. The sources of Vulture, the area of greatest production, have volcanic materials that provide the spring waters with a natural effervescence, a rare characteristic in the panorama of mineral waters. Among mineral waters to be mentioned are those produced by Fonti del Vulture and Gaudianello, both operating at Monticchio Bagni, a hamlet of Rionero in Vulture.

== See also ==
- Italian cuisine
- Cuisine of Abruzzo
- Apulian cuisine
- Arbëreshë cuisine
- Emilian cuisine
- Cuisine of Liguria
- Lombard cuisine
- Cuisine of Mantua
- Neapolitan cuisine
- Piedmontese cuisine
- Roman cuisine
- Cuisine of Sardinia
- Sicilian cuisine
- Tuscan cuisine
- Venetian cuisine

== Bibliography ==
- Piras, Claudia; Medagliani, Eugenio (2000). Culinaria Italy. Könemann Verlagsgesellschaft mbh. ISBN 3-8290-2901-2.
