= Gilo (disambiguation) =

Gilo can also refer to:

- Gilo, a settlement/neighborhood in Jerusalem
- Har Gilo, an Israeli settlement near Jerusalem in the West Bank
- An alternative spelling of Giloh, a biblical city
- Gilo River, a river in the Gambela Region of southwestern Ethiopia
- The fruit of the Scarlet eggplant or the plant itself, formerly known as Solanum gilo but now placed with the widespread Solanum aethiopicum
- A nickname for retired English cricketer Ashley Giles
- Gilo of Paris, twelfth-century bishop and poet
