= Pan minisc' =

Grape dessert from Basilicata, Italy

Pan minisc' is a sweet from the Basilicata region of Italy. It is made with grape must, flour and sugar.

== Name ==
The origin of the name is uncertain: it could mean 'grape bread' or 'mixed bread', and the pronunciation varies depending on the region, as does the name (it is also known as farinata, and in Avigliano and Potenza it is called paparotta). Traditionally associated with the grape harvest, it was an important source of energy for farmers when they had to face strenuous days of work.

== Preparation ==
The grape must is brought to a boil in a pot over low heat, and once removed from the fire, it is mixed with durum wheat flour, sugar and spices. Put back on the heat, the mixture is continuously stirred until it thickens. Then, it is spread out on a plate to cool down and, finally, served. Pan minisc' can be enjoyed either as a spoon dessert or cut into small portions and eaten with hands, depending on the desired consistency of the final product.

In various variations, both black and white grapes, or both, can be used, resulting in different colours (ranging from pinkish to purplish) and slightly different flavours (either sweeter or more sour). In Avigliano, the grape must is flavoured with cinnamon and/or cloves, while in other areas such as Val d'Agri, pine nuts, chestnuts, raisins or dried figs may be added.

== See also ==
- Cuisine of Basilicata
- List of Italian desserts and pastries
- Sugolo – similar Italian dessert
