= Tumact me tulez =

Pasta dish from Basilicata, Italy

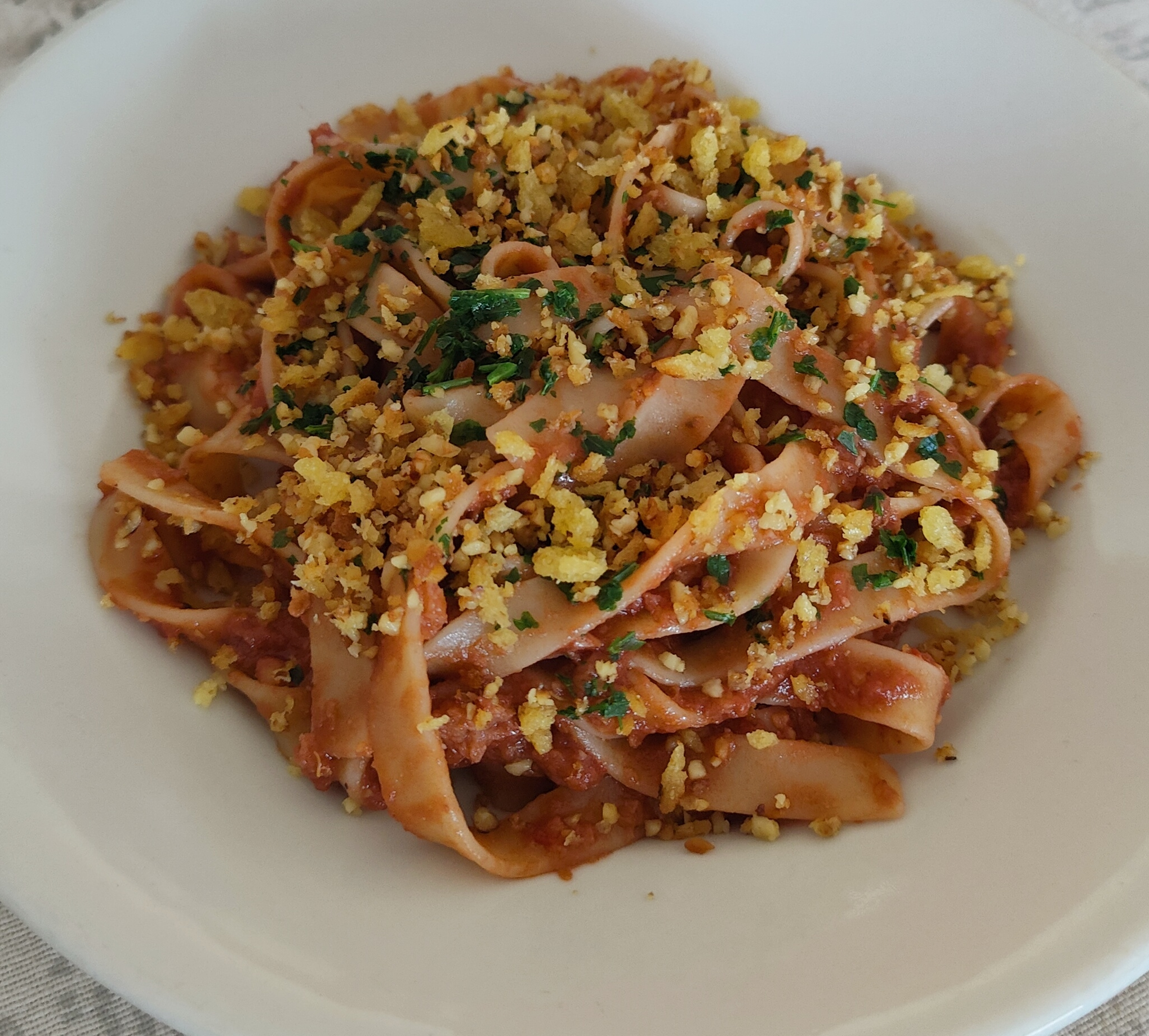
- Alternative names: Tumacë me tulë
- Course: Primo (Italian course)
- Place of origin: Italy
- Region or state: Basilicata
- Main ingredients: Tagliatelle, tomato, anchovy, breadcrumbs, walnuts

Tumact me tulez (tumacë me tulë in Albanian; lit. 'tagliatelle with breadcrumbs') is a pasta dish from southern Italy, specifically Basilicata, of Arbëreshë origin.

The dish is typical of Barile, a comune (municipality) in the province of Potenza where Albanian Christians settled in the 15th century to escape the Ottoman invasion of the Balkans. Its preparation was historically connected with particular events such as weddings, Saint Joseph's Day and Christmas. Despite its Arbëreshë origin, the dish has blended with local cuisine over time.

Tumact me tulez is served with tomato filets (or tomato sauce) and anchovy, in addition to fried breadcrumbs, chopped walnuts, garlic and parsley. Dried chili pepper can be added.

Pier Paolo Pasolini, who arrived in Barile for the shooting of his film The Gospel According to St. Matthew (1964), expressed appreciation for the dish.

A local festival (sagra) dedicated to the dish has been held since 1997. In 2018, American Express cited the sagra among "10 amazing Italian food festivals".

With ministerial decree of 25 February 2022, tumact me tulez entered the list of traditional Lucanian agri-food products (PAT).

== See also ==
- Cuisine of Basilicata
- Arbëreshë cuisine
- List of pasta
- List of pasta dishes
