= Cencioni =

Type of pasta

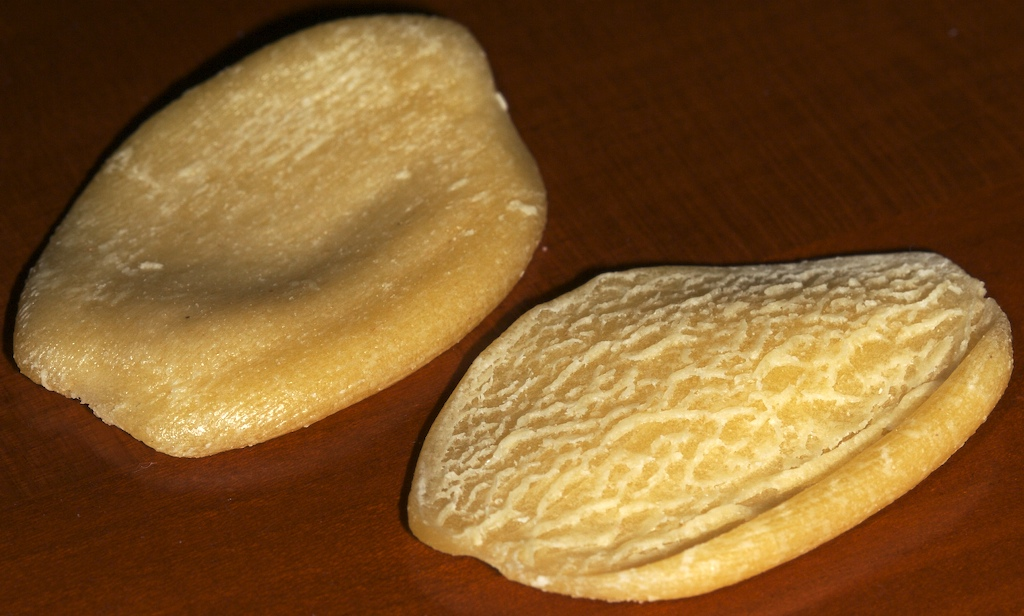
- Type: Pasta
- Place of origin: Italy

Cencioni (Italian: [tʃenˈtʃoːni]; Italian for 'little rag') are a type of pasta. They are oval and petal-shaped, with a slight curve, larger and flatter than orecchiette, with a more irregular shape and a rough texture to one side to help sauces cling better.

== See also ==
- List of pasta
