= Rafanata =

Italian egg-based dish

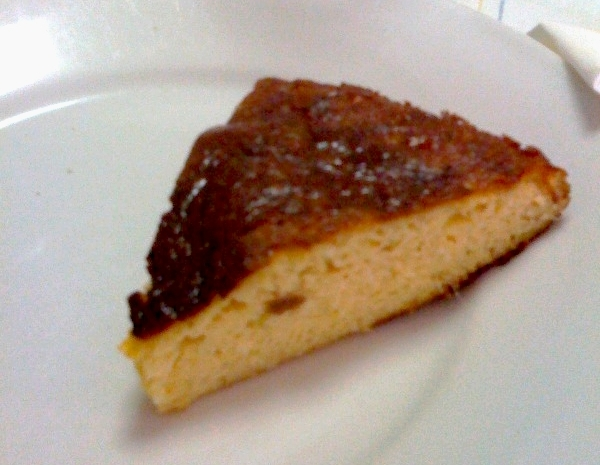
- Type: Savoury
- Place of origin: Italy
- Region or state: Basilicata
- Main ingredients: Eggs, horseradish, potatoes, pecorino, extra virgin olive oil

Rafanata is an egg-based dish from the Basilicata region of Italy. It is a type of baked frittata made with eggs, horseradish, potatoes, pecorino cheese, and extra virgin olive oil. Rafanata is typical of the Carnival and winter periods.

It is featured in Jamie Oliver's book Jamie Cooks Italy. With a ministerial decree of 25 February 2022, rafanata entered the list of traditional Lucanian agri-food products (PAT).

== Etymology ==
The name comes from rafano, the main ingredient of the dish, which means 'horseradish' in Italian.

== History ==
A dish of peasant origin, it takes its name from horseradish, the rhizome of the plant Armoracia rusticana, a root with a strongly balsamic and spicy taste, probably introduced by the Normans in Basilicata around the 11th century. Horseradish is an essential ingredient of traditional Lucanian cuisine; it often appeared on the tables of farmers and shepherds, being inexpensive, rich in health properties, and a good source of vitamins. Therefore, horseradish is also known in Basilicata as u tartuf' d'i povr' òmm, meaning 'the truffle of the poor'.

Rafanata is traditionally a dish linked to the Carnival festivities, prepared from the feast of Saint Anthony (January 17) until Shrove Tuesday.

== See also ==
- Cuisine of Basilicata
- List of egg dishes
- Frittata
