= Orecchiette =

Type of pasta

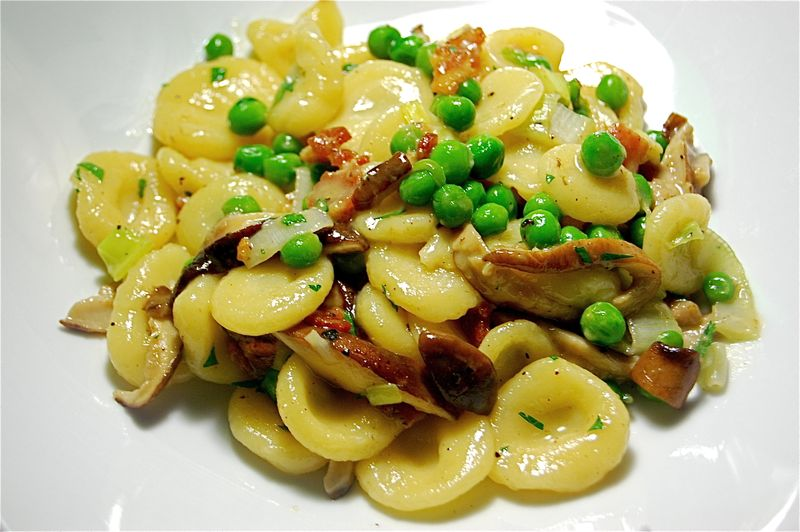
- Orecchiette with peas and bacon (piselli e pancetta)
- Type: Pasta
- Place of origin: Italy
- Region or state: Apulia
- Main ingredients: Durum wheat flour, water

Orecchiette is a pasta typical of the Apulia region of Italy. Their name comes from the Italian word for "ear," a reference to their shape.

== Description ==
An orecchietta has the shape of a small dome, with its center thinner than its edge, and with a rough outer surface that helps it hold thick sauces. Like most other types of pasta from southern Italy, orecchiette are made with durum wheat semolina, water, and salt; eggs are rarely used. Individual orecchietta typically measure approximately one inch (2.5 cm) in width.

In traditional southern Italian home cooking, the dough is rolled into a thin rope and cut into small cubes. Each cube is pressed and dragged on the board with a small knife, producing a curled shape; the result is then inverted over the thumb to give the characteristic concave form.

== Etymology ==
The name orecchiette (Italian pronunciation: [orekˈkjɛtte]; singular: orecchietta) derives from the Italian orecchia ("ear") with the diminutive suffix -etta. In the vernacular of Taranto they are called recchietedde or chiancaredde. In the Bari dialect they are often referred to as strasc'nat (from the Italian strascinare, "to drag"), a reference to the technique of dragging the dough across the board with a finger or knife.

== History ==
Orecchiette are documented in the Apulia region from at least the 12th and 13th centuries, particularly around Bari. A 16th-century manuscript referring to the dish is held in the archives of the Church of San Nicola in Bari. Some historians attribute the origin to local Pugliese tradition, while others propose a Provençal origin, suggesting that a similar pasta was produced in southern France during the Middle Ages and brought to Apulia by the Angevin dynasty when they ruled the region in the 13th century. The Angevin connection remains debated among food historians.

== Regional variants ==
In Cisternino, orecchiette are made with durum wheat semolina; they are larger and assume a different shape, with deep internal ribs that more closely resemble a human ear. These are known locally as recchie d' privte ("priest's ears") and are traditionally served on holidays with ragù of rabbit.

Closely related shapes include cavatelli, strascinati (strascinate in the vernacular of Bari), and cencioni. These are made by the same dragging technique but without the final step of forming a concave shape; strascinati and cencioni are typically larger than orecchiette.

== Production tradition in Bari ==
In the old town of Bari, particularly along Via dell'Arco Basso in Bari Vecchia, women have traditionally produced orecchiette by hand and sold them to passersby from tables set up outside their homes. The imagery of these so-called "pasta grannies" has become an internationally recognized symbol of southern Italian culinary tradition and a significant draw for tourism. As of 2019, the women were not permitted to sell to restaurants or other commercial establishments.

In August 2025, a police raid prompted by allegations that factory-produced orecchiette was being passed off as handmade discovered pasta-making machines in some of the houses. Three women were subsequently convicted of fraudulent trading.

== Preparation and sauces ==
The most iconic Apulian preparation is orecchiette alle cime di rapa, orecchiette served with rapini (turnip tops), often dressed with garlic, anchovies, chili pepper, and extra-virgin olive oil, and finished with grated cacioricotta cheese. Outside the rapini season, broccoli or cauliflower are commonly substituted, and the dish may also be dressed with tomato sauce (al sugo), sometimes with miniature meatballs or a sprinkling of ricotta or ricotta forte, particularly around Capitanata and Salento.

The Italian cookbook Il cucchiaio d'argento (The Silver Spoon) notes that the concave shape and rough surface make orecchiette particularly well suited to vegetable-based sauces. They are also served with meat, capers, and a crisp white wine in some preparations outside Apulia.

== See also ==
- List of pasta

== Sources ==
- Zanini De Vita, Oretta (2009). "Orecchiette". Encyclopedia of Pasta. University of California Press. pp. 188–190. ISBN 978-0-520-94471-8.
- Sada, Luigi (1994). La cucina pugliese. Newton-Compton.
