= Pasta mollicata =

Italian pasta dish

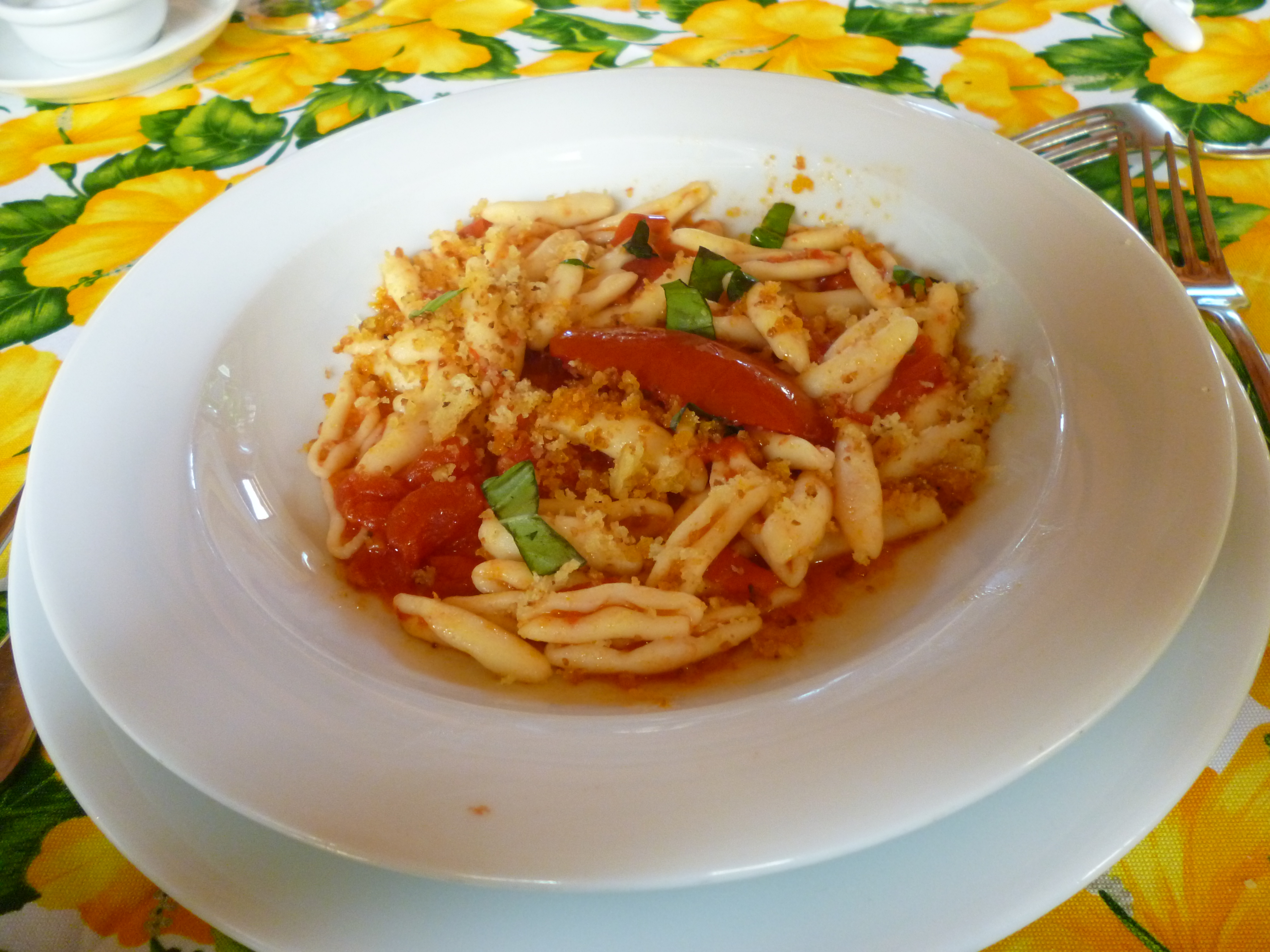
- Pasta mollicata in Matera, Basilicata, Italy
- Course: Primo (Italian course)
- Place of origin: Italy
- Region or state: Basilicata; Calabria; Sicily
- Main ingredients: Pasta, onions, breadcrumbs
- Variations: Fresh leeks, chopped nuts, fresh mushrooms

Pasta mollicata is a pasta dish based on breadcrumbs, particularly common in the Basilicata, Calabria, and Sicily regions of Italy. Compared to other pasta recipes, it is considered a "poor dish" because it is not prepared with many ingredients.

== Preparation ==
Pasta mollicata is usually made by frying a chopped onion (previously dipped in red wine) in a cooking pan with olive oil and a bit of lard. A chopped tomato is then added to the mixture and cooked on high heat for several minutes. Afterwards, some stale bread reduced to crumbs is added and the pan is left on high heat for about 15 minutes. After draining the salty pasta and stir-frying it with a bit of cacioricotta cheese, the dish is seasoned with more fresh cacioricotta, oil, and some hot pepper.

== See also ==
Media related to Pasta mollicata at Wikimedia Commons

- List of pasta
- List of pasta dishes
