= Arbëreshë cuisine =

Italo-Albanian ethnic cuisine

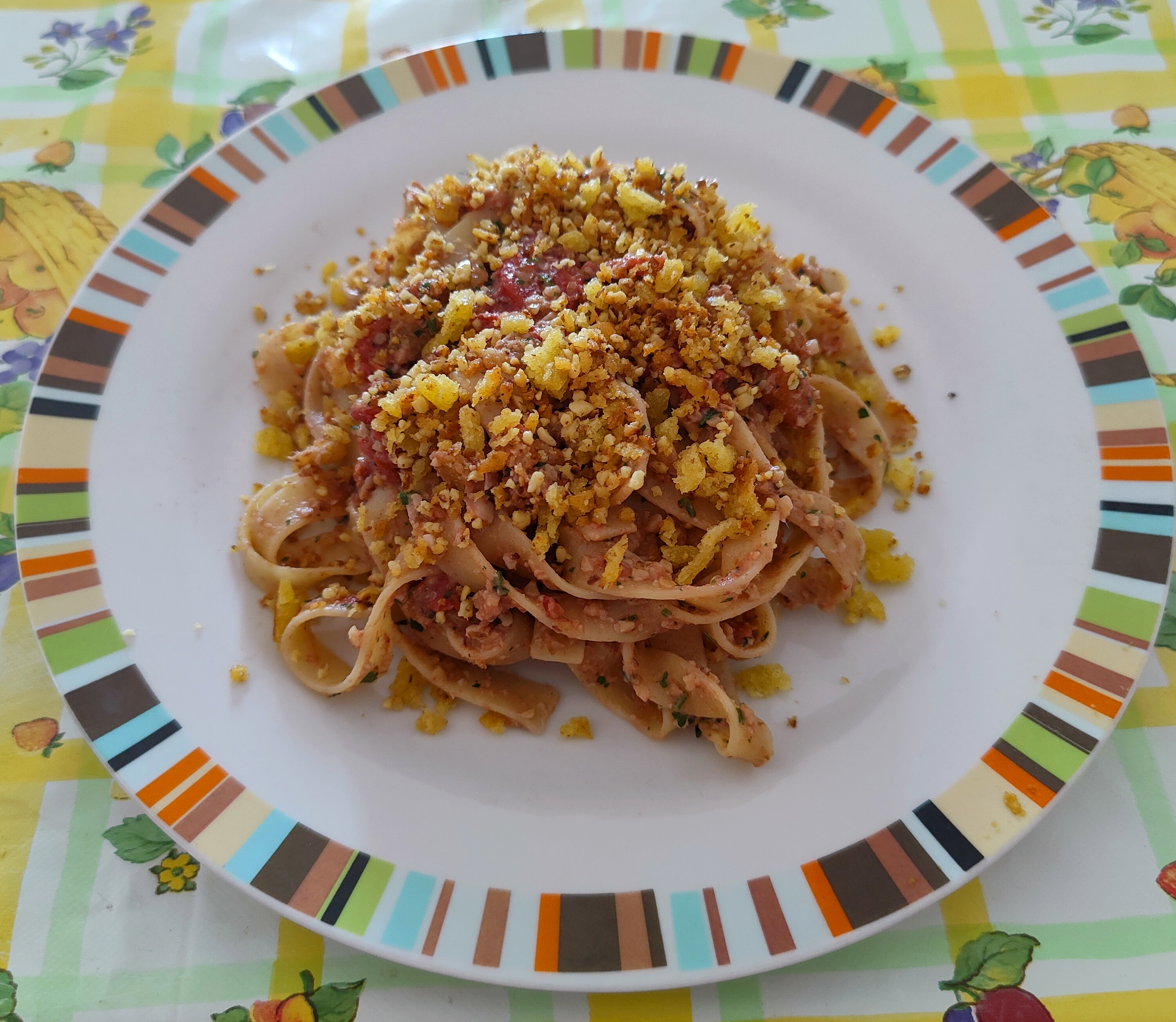
Tumact me tulez, an Arbëreshë dish from Basilicata.

The Arbëreshë cuisine (Albanian: Kuzhina arbëreshe; Italian: Cucina arbëreshë) is the cuisine of the Arbëreshë people (Italo-Albanians) who settled in southern Italy between the 15th and 18th centuries after successive migrations from Albania, Epirus, Chameria and Morea, during the Ottoman conquest of the Balkans.

In the 2010 book My Calabria, by authors Rosetta Costantino and Janet Fletcher, Arbëreshë cuisine is described as largely indistinguishable from the broader Cuisine of Calabria, with only a few pasta varieties lacking a Calabrian equivalent.

== History ==
Preserved for centuries in the Arbëreshë communities of Calabria, Basilicata, Sicily, Molise, Campania, Abruzzo and Apulia, the cuisine combines traditional Albanian dishes with the ingredients and culinary practices of southern Italy.

One of the clearest examples of this fusion is found in Abruzzo, where the tepsi is prepared as a savory pie filled with spinach, onions and pine nuts beneath a pastry crust. Possibly deriving from the Albanian byrek, its meatless filling and preparation also resemble the Neapolitan "pizza di scarola".

In Portocannone, the traditional gjimave, once prepared with lamb, evolved to include tomatoes and boiled potatoes, while cheeses such as pecorino and parmigiano became common additions or replacements for earlier ingredients.

The rustic cake cugliaccio derives from the Albanian kulaç, a simple round bread. In San Costantino Albanese, it is prepared with wheat flour, semolina, eggs, olive oil, lard, natural yeast, brewer’s yeast and wild fennel.

Main dishes are centered on slow-cooked goat, lamb and pork. One local specialty is the capretto alla civitese, a braised kid goat seasoned with bay leaves. Matured cheeses, cured meats such as likëngë, wild herbs and seasonal vegetables are widely used.

Recipes based around vegetables include luljékuq ma fazuljé, corn poppy leaves cooked with beans and bathë e çikour, mashed fava beans served with wild chicory. On Christmas Eve, anchovies or dried fish are traditionally served with boiled and fried shoots of cultivated turnip (çim de rrapë) or wild mustard (sënap). At Easter, a festive pie known as verdhët is prepared using eggs, lamb, ricotta cheese and the boiled leaf stalks of Spanish salsify (Scolymus hispanicus).

== Pasta varieties ==
Among the best-known Arbëreshë pasta varieties are dromësat, small pellets of flour dough cooked directly in sauce and shtridhëlat, handmade ribbon-like noodles traditionally served with chickpeas and beans. Other local specialties include strangùle me nenezë, a type of handmade cavatelli dressed with fresh goat ricotta and nenesa, a wild nettle-like herb from the Pollino massif, as well as fillatjel, which are commonly served with fresh tomato sauce, porcini mushrooms or, in more recent adaptations, Calabrian ’nduja.

Tumact me tulez is a traditional pasta dish from the Arbëreshë town of Barile. It consists of handmade tagliatelle served with a sauce of tomatoes, anchovies, garlic, white wine and fresh basil. Rather than cheese, the pasta is finished with a topping of fried breadcrumbs mixed with chopped walnuts and parsley, giving the dish its distinctive texture.

== Desserts ==
Traditional Arbëreshë desserts include giuggiulea, a nougat similar to Sicilian varieties; kanarikuj, honey-coated dumplings; cruscoli, biscuits prepared with flour, olive oil and wine; maiatka, thin pancakes served either sweet or savory; cullurielli, leavened festive fritters; kasolle megijze, ricotta-filled pastries; and pitta, a pastry filled with dried fruit, raisins and honey that is commonly associated with Easter.

Calabria, home to the largest Arbëreshë community in Italy, has retained many of these traditional recipes. In Spezzano Albanese, vecchiarelle are among the oldest local sweets. These fried, ring-shaped pastries are coated with sugar and closely resemble Calabrian zeppole. They are traditionally prepared for the Feast of Saint Joseph on March 19th.

In the Arbëreshë settlements of Campania, Easter is celebrated using pastries known as panaret (basket) and nucia (bride). Made from sweet pastry and decorated with colored sugar sprinkles, they are shaped into baskets and dolls as part of the annual holiday tradition.

The cannoli prepared in Piana degli Albanesi are often considered among the best in the island of Sicily. Their crisp handmade shells are traditionally fried in lard, filled with smooth local sheep’s milk ricotta enriched with chocolate chips and, in some variations, honey and chopped pistachios.

== Traditional dishes ==
- Papoçulla (papocciulo) – Lightly sweetened leavened pastries made from a brioche-style dough and decorated with simple facial features. They are often eaten for breakfast with cured meats.
- Makarrunet – Long, fusilli-like pasta made from flour and water without eggs. The strands are formed by rolling the dough around a dried willow stick and are typically served with tomato sauce and meatballs or a chicken-based sauce.
- Tumacët – Handmade ribbons of fresh eggless pasta resembling tagliatelle, usually served with tomato sauce or a sauce made from beans and chili peppers.
- Strangujët – Gnocchi traditionally prepared with potatoes, although some villages make them using only flour and water. They are shaped with a hollow center and served with tomato sauce, basil and local cheese.
- Dromësat – Small handmade pasta pellets made from flour and cooked directly in the sauce.
- Shtridhëlat – Ribbon-like noodles traditionally served with chickpeas and beans.
- Turdile – Fried sweets made from potatoes and flour, traditionally prepared at Christmas and coated with Calabrian fig honey.
- Natallize – Traditional bread baked for Christmas and Easter from flour, water and yeast, shaped as cradles or braided loaves.
- Kot e kot – A traditional stew of goat or mutton, slow-cooked in communal cauldrons for the Feast of Saint John on 24 June.
- Kanarikuj – Large honey-coated dumplings.
- Kasolle megijze – Pastry rolls filled with ricotta.
- Panaret – Basket-shaped Easter pastries with shortcrust handles, decorated with flowers and birds and containing red or green dyed eggs.
- Nucia – A doll-shaped Easter cake decorated with an egg representing the face.
- Nxhinetta (Ginetti) – Tall, yeast-free biscuits coated with an egg white and sugar glaze. They are traditionally hung from the Kalimera, a decorated palm branch used during Easter celebrations and weddings.
- Pettule – Fritters made from potatoes or from a simple flour-and-water dough, served plain or coated with sugar during the Vallje festival.

== See also ==
- Albanian cuisine
- Italian cuisine
