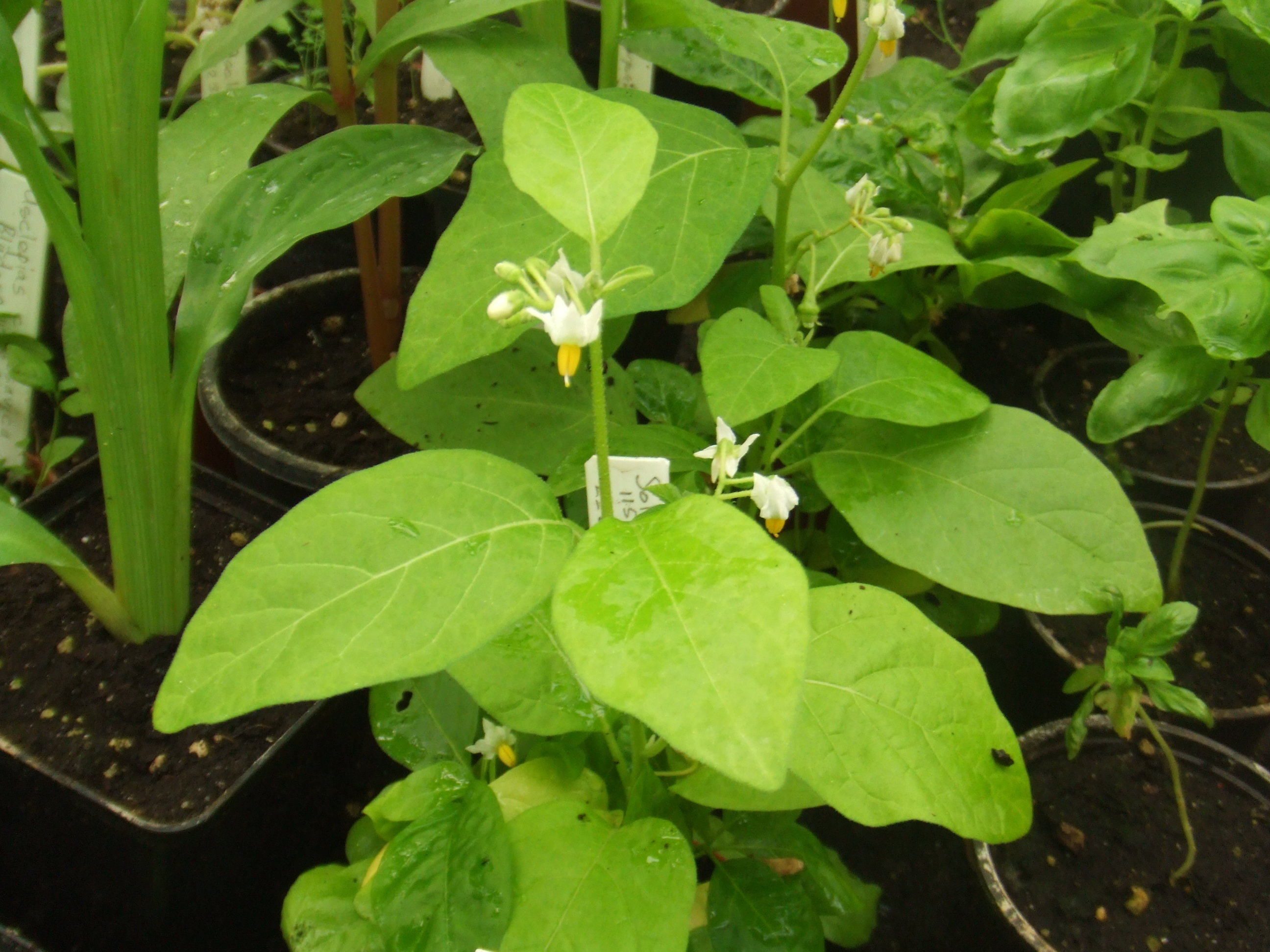

Scientific classification
- Kingdom: Plantae
- Clade: Embryophytes
- Clade: Tracheophytes
- Clade: Spermatophytes
- Clade: Angiosperms
- Clade: Eudicots
- Clade: Asterids
- Order: Solanales
- Family: Solanaceae
- Genus: Solanum
- Species: S. aethiopicum

Binomial name
- Solanum aethiopicum L.

= Solanum aethiopicum =

Fruiting plant

Solanum aethiopicum, the bitter tomato, Ethiopian eggplant, or nakati, is a fruiting plant of the genus Solanum mainly found in Asia and Tropical Africa. It is also known as Ethiopian nightshade, garden eggs, pumpkin-on-a-stick, and mock tomato. It is a popular vegetable in north-east India, and is known as khamen akhaba in Manipuri and samṭawk in Mizo. They are called Titay bii or simply bii in Darjeeling, Sikkim and Nepal, and are relished with meat, particularly pork. These names are a result of its varied morphology, with ripe fruit often looking like a cross between an eggplant and a tomato, which are also from Solanum. In fact, the Ethiopian eggplant was so much confused with the ordinary eggplant that this was considered by some a variety violaceum of S. aethiopicum.

== Genetics ==
Ethiopian eggplant may have originated from the domestication of Solanum anguivi. The scarlet eggplant, also known as Gilo or jiló, was long held to be a distinct species (S. gilo) but is nowadays generally considered to be a cultivar group of S. aethiopicum.

Ethiopian eggplant has been used as a source of disease resistance genes for several commercially grown Solanaceae crops, including Solanum melongena (eggplant). A lack of genomic resources has meant that breeding has lagged behind other vegetables, although a 1.02-Gb draft genome sequenced by BGI, with single-nucleotide polymorphisms identified for use by breeders was released in 2019. A high-quality genomic assembly of S. aethiopicum was released in 2025, enabling the identification of the genetic basis of key agronomic traits.

== Uses ==
The leaves of Solanum aethiopicum are eaten as a leaf vegetable and are actually more nutritious than the fruit.

The highly variable fruit of the plant is eaten both raw and cooked and is becoming more popular as a cultivated crop. These fruits are usually harvested while still green, before the skin becomes thick. Bitterness increases with higher levels of saponin in the fruit, some varieties being sweet and others very bitter. When the berries mature, they turn bright red because of high carotene content.

Solanum aethiopicum is used as an ornamental in Asia.

In Nigeria, Igbo people use it as a substitute for kola nut, especially for those who do not want to chew kola nut, in which case it is used to welcome guests at home or before resumption of a traditional ceremony.

Garden egg, as it is commonly known in Nigeria, is sometimes used to make a tomato-based sauce which can be used to eat yam.

=== Cultivation ===
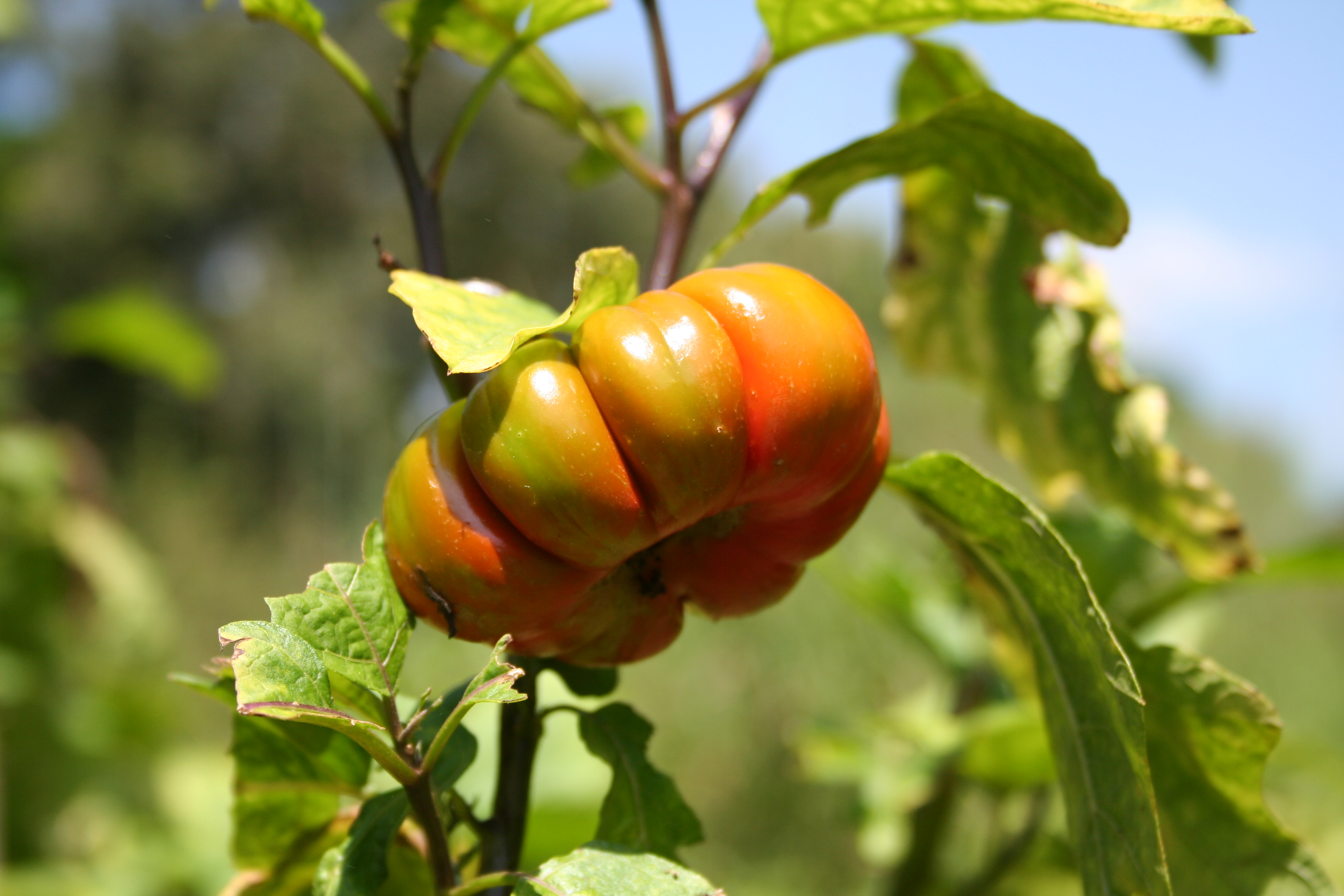
Fruit of S. aethiopicum from SW Burkina Faso

Currently there is a large movement towards increased cultivation of Solanum aethiopicum in West Africa. It grows all year long and can produce high fruit yields. However, low germination rates are an obstacle to wider cultivation.

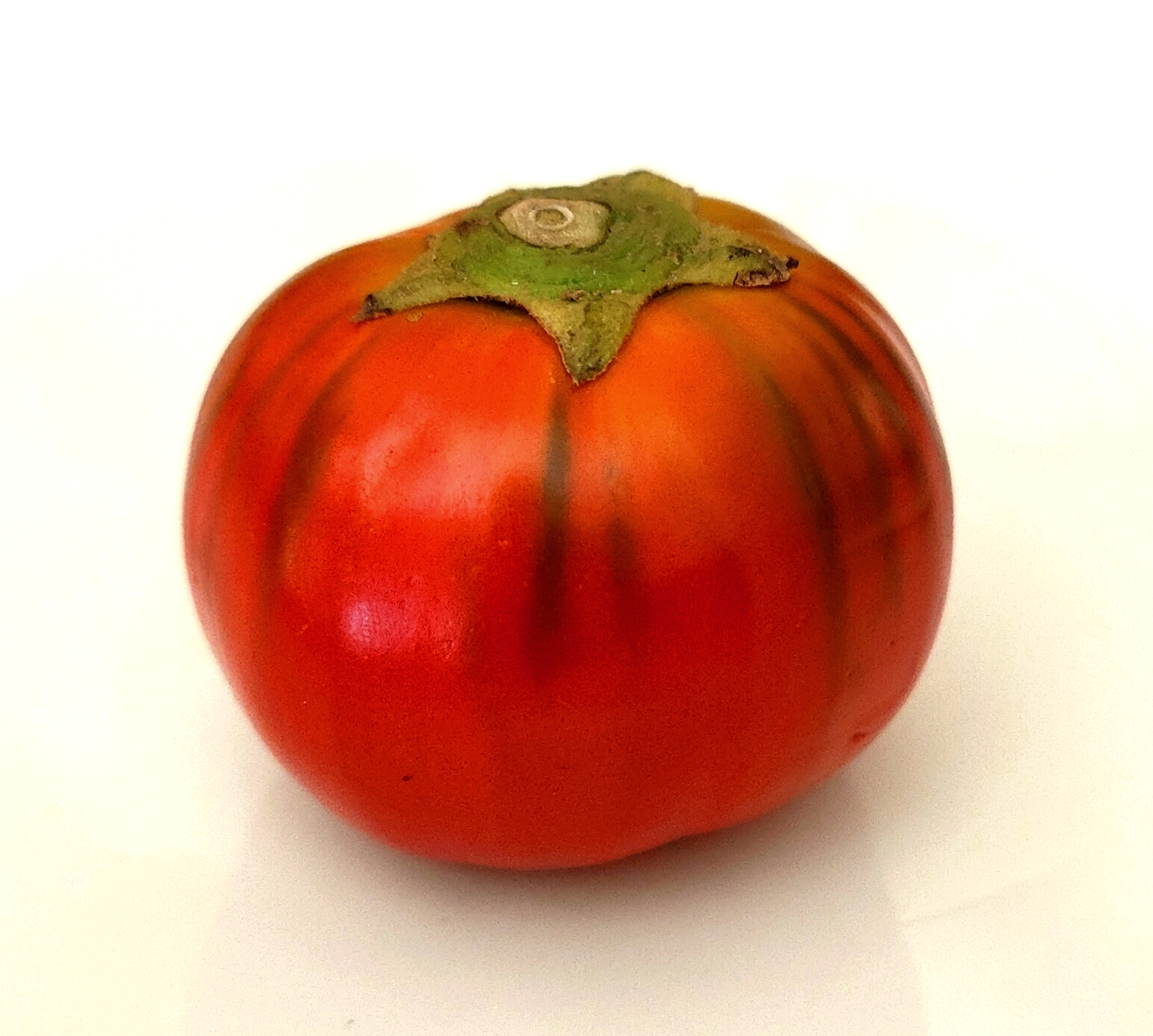
Melanzana rossa di Rotonda, Basilicata, variety of S. aethiopicum cultivated in Italy

The only place where S. aethiopicum is grown to a significant extent in Europe lies in South Italy, in Rotonda in the Basilicata, where this plant is of some commercial importance. It was likely introduced by veterans returning from East Africa after the colonial war in the late 19th century.

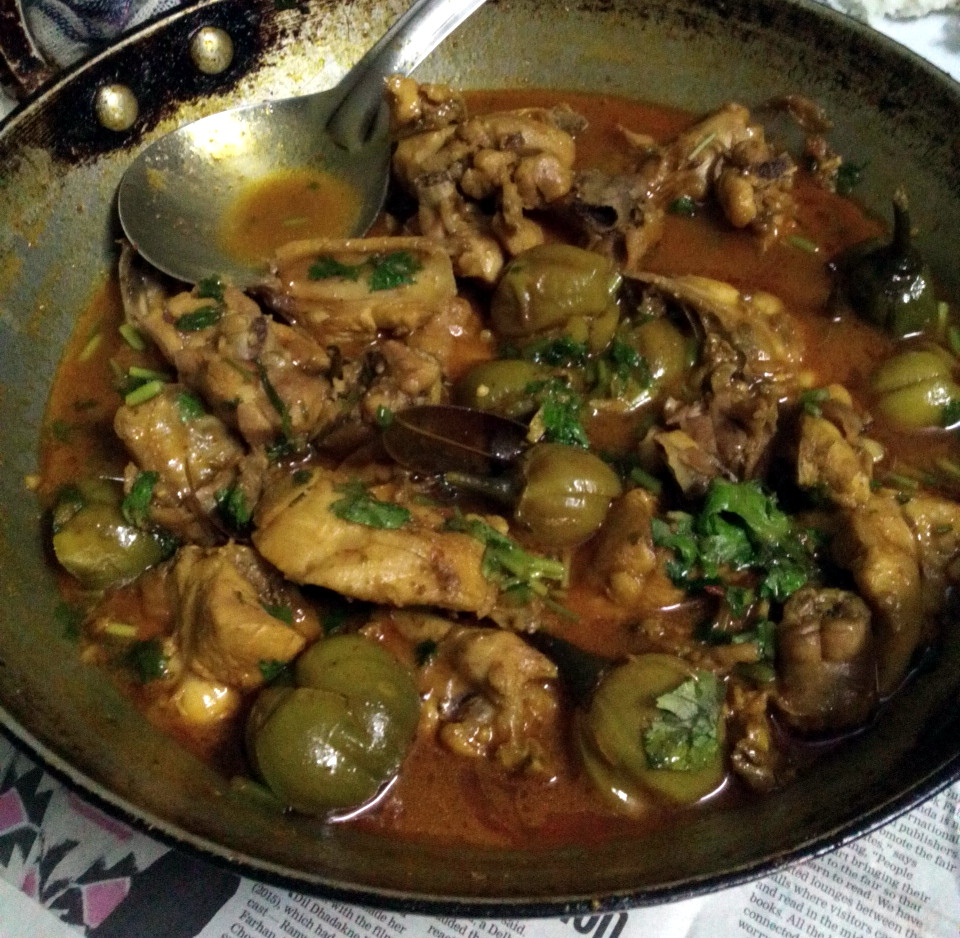
Chicken cooked with bitter tomato in northeast India

=== Cultivars ===
Cultivars have been allocated into four groups, termed Gilo, Shum, Kumba and Aculeatum. Gilo are grown only for fruit, Shum only for their leaves, Kumba are grown for both their leaves and fruit, Aculateum are ornamental.

- 'Turkish Orange' or 'Turkish Italian'

The fruits of this variety are about 2 inches in diameter and turn bright orange-red when ripe, although they are usually eaten when still green. The sweet taste is often used in Thai curry. It can produce fruit within just 75 days after planting.

- 'Sweet Red'

These striped fruits, just 1 inch in diameter, have a strong but non-bitter flavor. The plant is thornless and grows up to 3 feet tall. It can produce fruit 125 days after planting.

- 'Small Ruffled Red', 'Red Ruffles', or 'Hmong Red'

The two-inch berries of the 'Hmong Red' have deep creases and a bitter flavor used in Southeast Asian cooking. It can produce fruit 100 days after planting.

- 'Gilo', 'Jiló', 'Scarlet eggplant' or garden eggs

Grown mainly in Brazil and sub-Saharan Africa. It has a bitter taste and is usually consumed cooked. The plant takes 75 days to reach maturity. Plants vary in size, shape, taste, etc.

- 'Liberian eggplant'

Landrace from Liberia. Immature fruit are white in color. They are used in soups and stews like Tabughee. The plant takes 85 days to reach maturity.
