= Acquasale =

Southern Italian dish

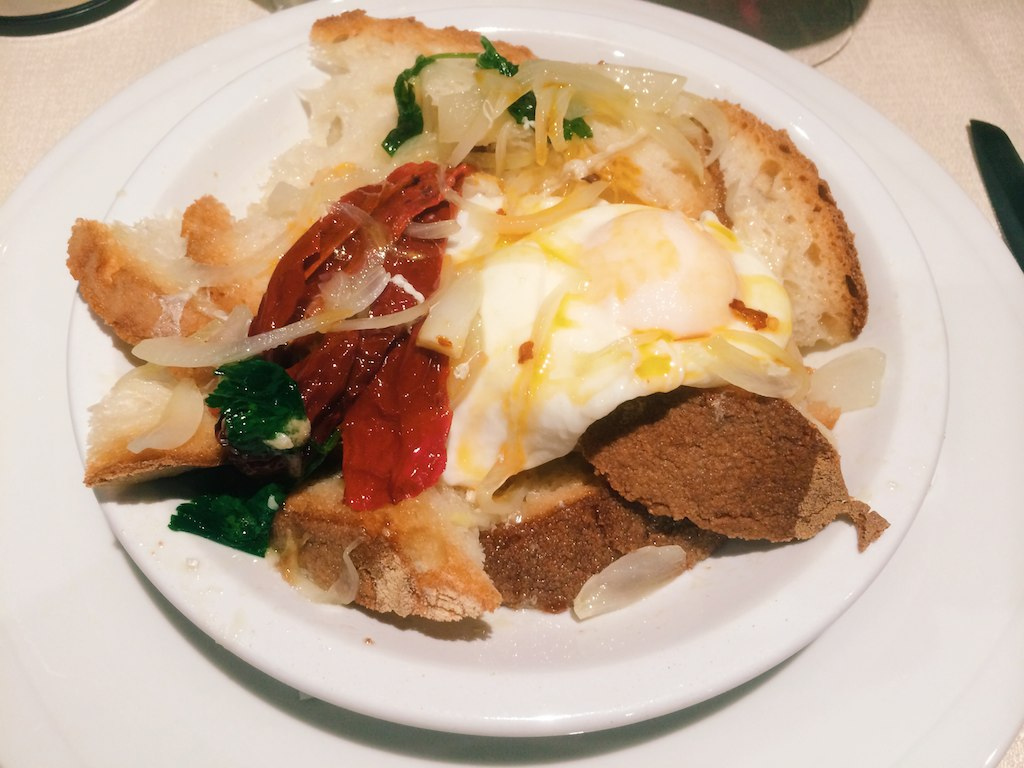
- Acquasale from Basilicata, Italy
- Alternative names: Cialledda
- Type: Antipasto
- Place of origin: Italy
- Region or state: Basilicata; Campania; Apulia
- Main ingredients: Stale bread, salt, extra virgin olive oil, tomato, oregano, egg, peppers
- Variations: Caponata, panzanella

Acquasale or cialledda is a dish characteristic of southern Italian cuisine, especially in Basilicata, Campania, and Apulia regions.

It is made with stale bread, salt, olive oil, tomato, oregano, egg, and peppers, and served in a soup dish.
