= Soppressata =

Italian dry salami (sausage)

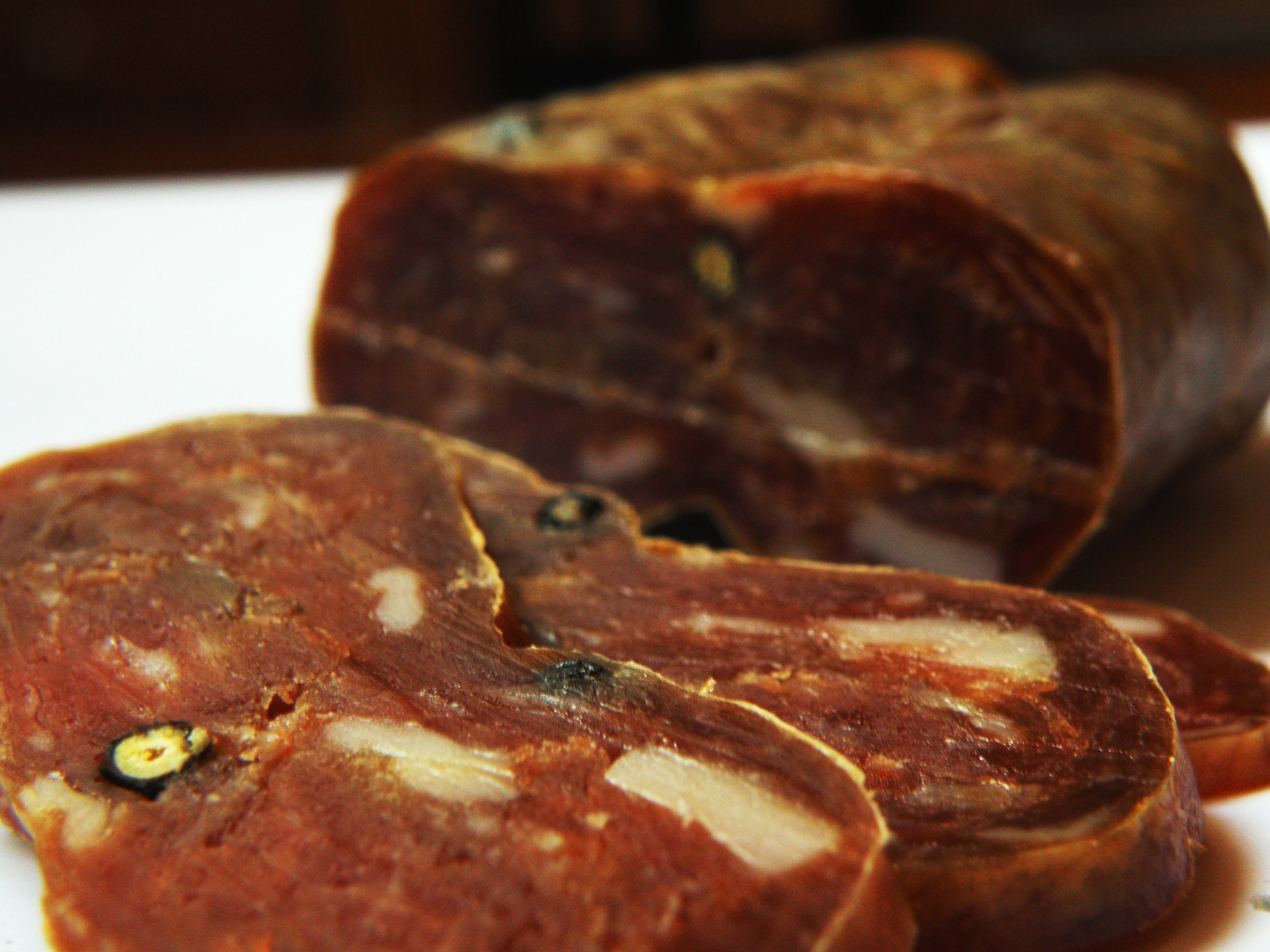
Soppressata from Basilicata

Soppressata is an Italian dry meat product (salume). Although there are many variations, two principal types are made: a cured dry sausage typical of Basilicata, Apulia, and Calabria, and a very different uncured salami made in Tuscany and Liguria. It is still part of southern Italian cultural heritage that local people (especially in the smaller rural towns) slaughter the pig themselves and use it all, with nothing going to waste, using some parts to make cured meats, including soppressata. It is sometimes prepared using prosciutto.

== Varieties ==
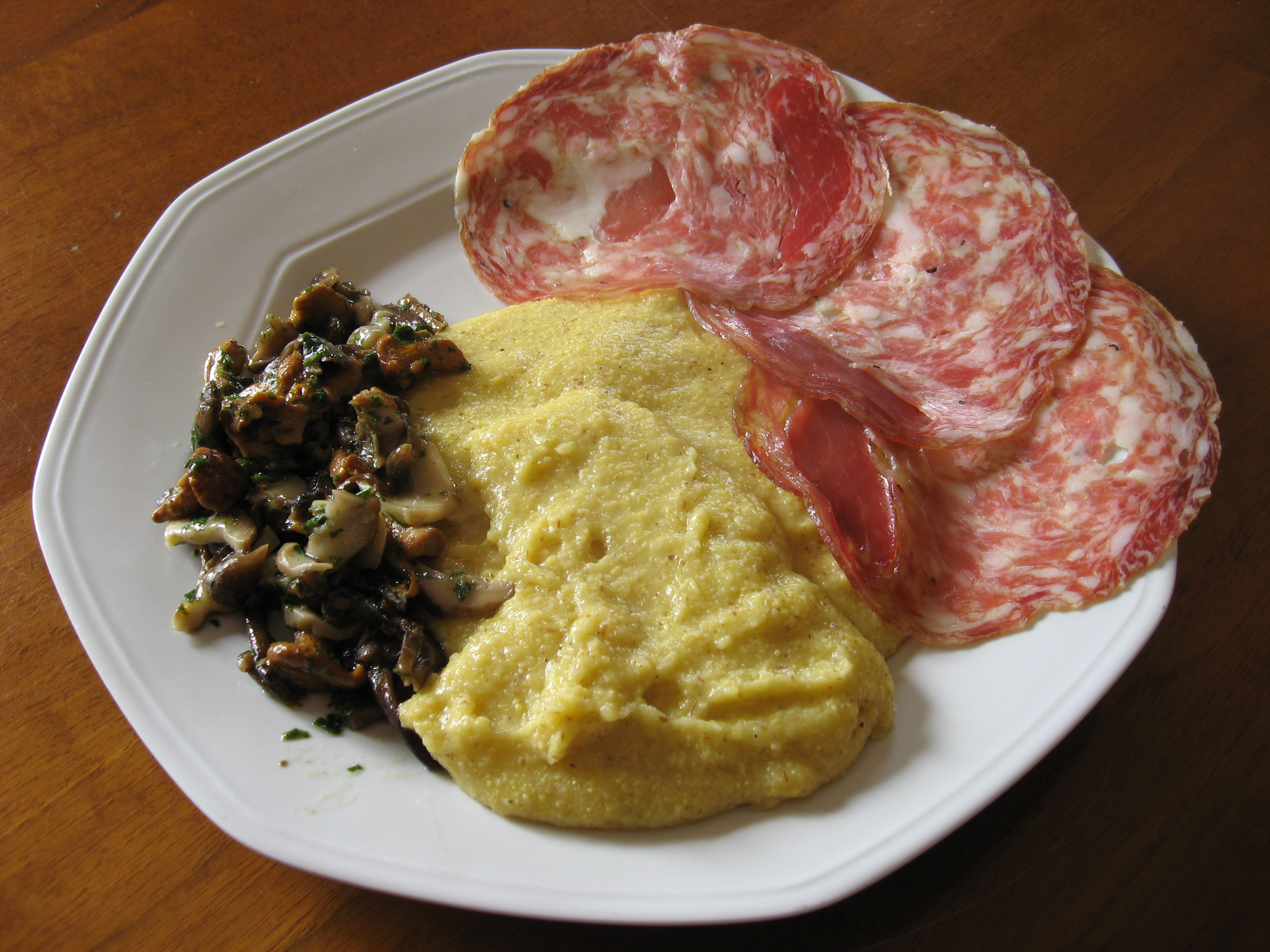
A plate of sopressa vicentina served with polenta and mushrooms

Soppressata di Basilicata is mainly produced in Rivello, Cancellara, Vaglio, and Lagonegro. Soppressata di Calabria enjoys protected designation of origin (PDO) status; the one produced in Acri and Decollatura is especially renowned.

Sopressa veneta (or just sopressa) got its name from the practice of pressing the salami between planks of wood resulting in a straight, flattened shape. It is a typical product of the Veneto region.

== See also ==
Media related to Soppressata at Wikimedia Commons Media related to Soppressa vicentina at Wikimedia Commons
