= Scarlet eggplant =

Fruiting plant of the genus Solanum, related to the tomato and eggplant

Scarlet eggplant Gilo
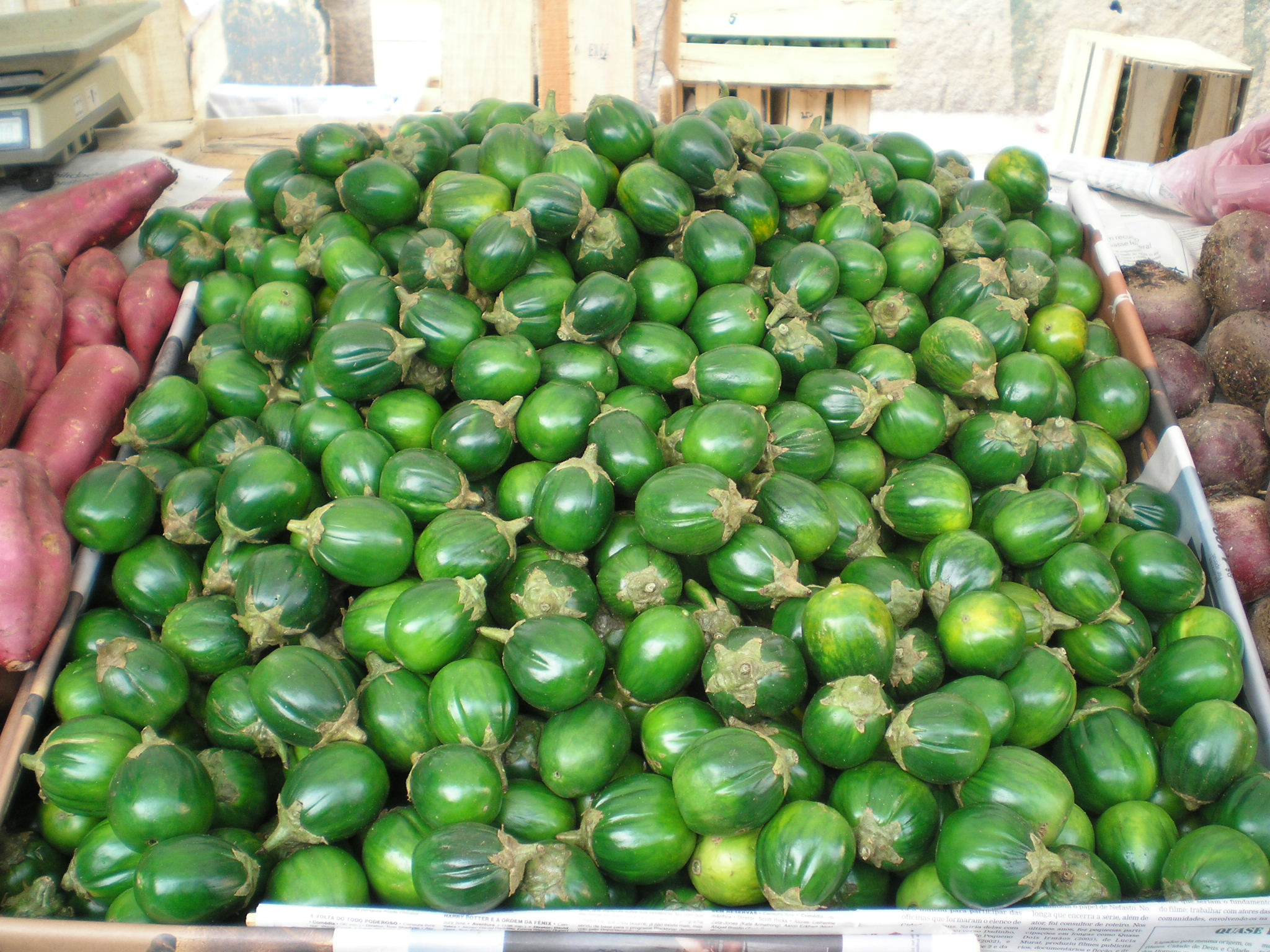
- Jiló (var. morro redondo) in a market in São Paulo, Brazil
- Species: Solanum aethiopicum
- Cultivar group: Gilo Group
- Cultivar group members: Many; see text.

The scarlet eggplant is a fruiting plant of the genus Solanum, related to the tomato and eggplant. Its green fruit is known as gilo (Brazilian Portuguese: jiló, from Kimbundu njilu). It was once treated as a distinct species, Solanum gilo, but it is now known to be a cultivar group of Solanum aethiopicum (the Ethiopian eggplant or nakati).

Gilo was brought to Brazil from West Africa during the slave trade. It is still grown in West Africa, where it is sometimes called "garden eggs."

Widely grown in Brazil, it is normally cooked as a vegetable. The fruit turns orange-red when ripe, but is usually picked and cooked while it is green. In Mizo it is called samtawk.

== Varieties, taste and usage ==
Some varieties, like morro redondo, can have a bitter flavor which is an acquired taste. Solanum gilo 'Black Stream' has black stems and red or orange fruits; it is grown in France as an ornamental, and can be dried for winter decorations.
