= Padraccio =

Italian cheese

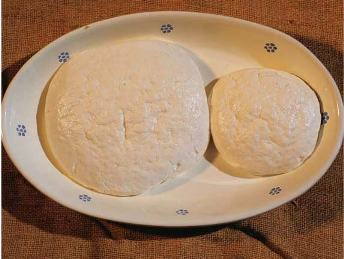
Padraccio

Padraccio is an Italian cheese made in Basilicata, typical of the Pollino National Park area. It is recognized as a prodotto agroalimentare tradizionale (PAT) of Basilicata.

The cheese is made from a mixture of the milk of the Lucana grey goat (capra grigia lucana) – a rare breed of goat from the Apennines – and sheep's milk.

== Production ==
Padraccio is produced between April and July. Raw milk is heated to 37–38 °C (99–100 °F) degrees before the (sheep or goat) rennet is added. The cheese sets in 20–30 minutes. When the curds break, the cheese is transferred to a wicker container and worked with the fingers. It is then pressed, using the flat of the hand, to end up with a spherical shape. Finally, this fresh cheese with no added salt needing no ripening time is wrapped in fern leaves.

== See also ==
- List of Italian cheeses
