= Rotonda, Basilicata =

Rotonda
- Comune
- Comune di Rotonda
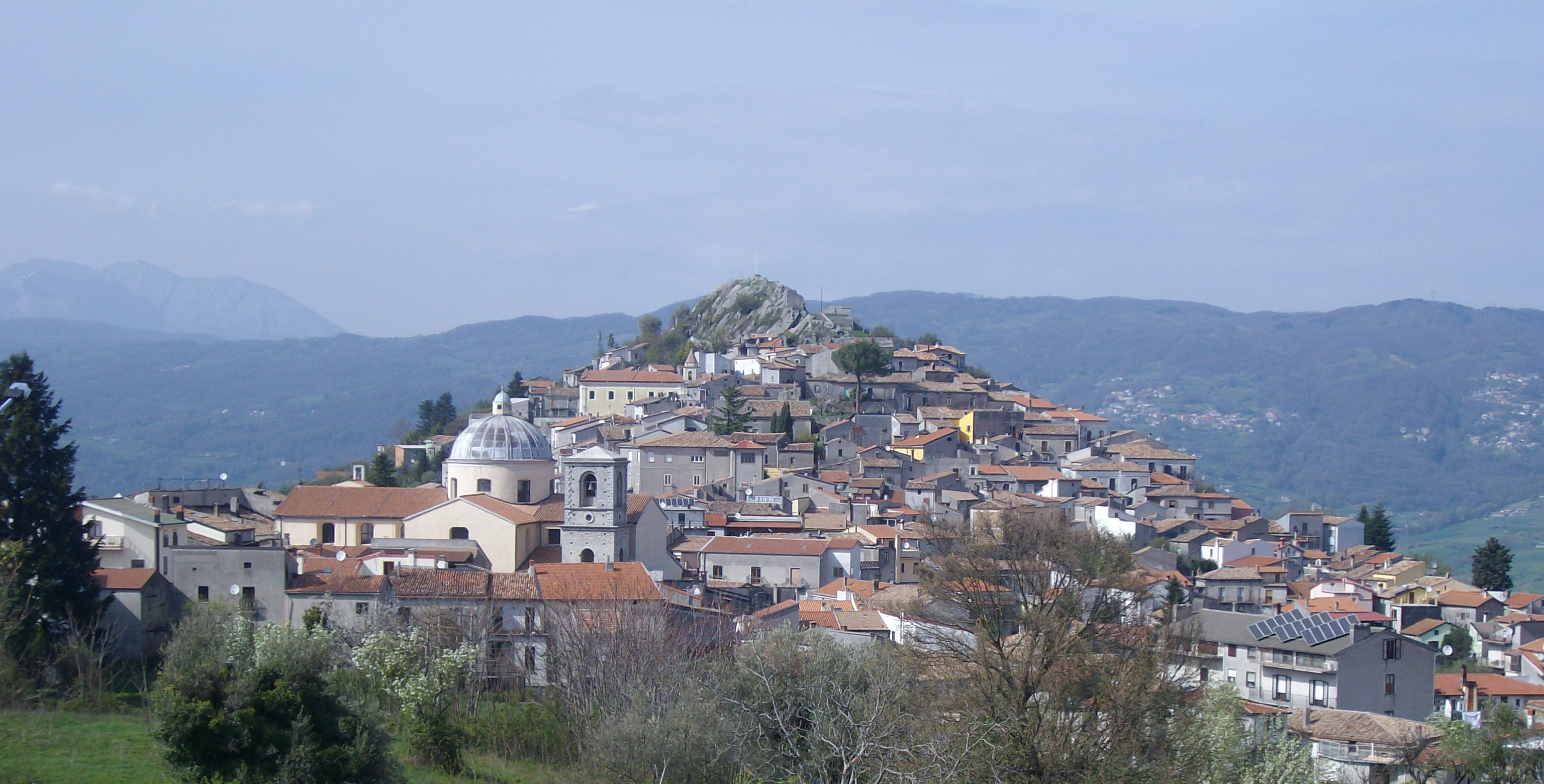
- View of Rotonda, Basilicata

- Location within Italy Location within Basilicata
- Coordinates: 39°57′N 16°2′E
- Country: Italy
- Region: Basilicata
- Province: Potenza (PZ)

Government
  - Mayor: Rocco Bruno

Area
  - Total: 42.92 km^{2} (16.57 sq mi)
- Elevation: 635 m (2,083 ft)

Population (December 2008)
  - Total: 3,632
  - Density: 84.62/km^{2} (219.2/sq mi)
- Demonym: Rotondesi
- Time zone: UTC+1 (CET)
  - Summer (DST): UTC+2 (CEST)
- Postal code: 85048
- Dialing code: 0973
- ISTAT code: 076070
- Patron saint: St. Anthony of Padua
- Saint day: 8–13 June
- Website: Official website

Rotonda (Lucano: Rutunna) is a town and comune in the province of Potenza, in the Southern Italian region of Basilicata.

Rotonda is home to the Melanzana rossa di Rotonda production. This is the only Ethiopian Eggplant grown in Europe in significant quantities. It is a reddish kind of aubergine that looks similar to a tomato.
