= Sarconi =

- Comune
- Comune di Sarconi
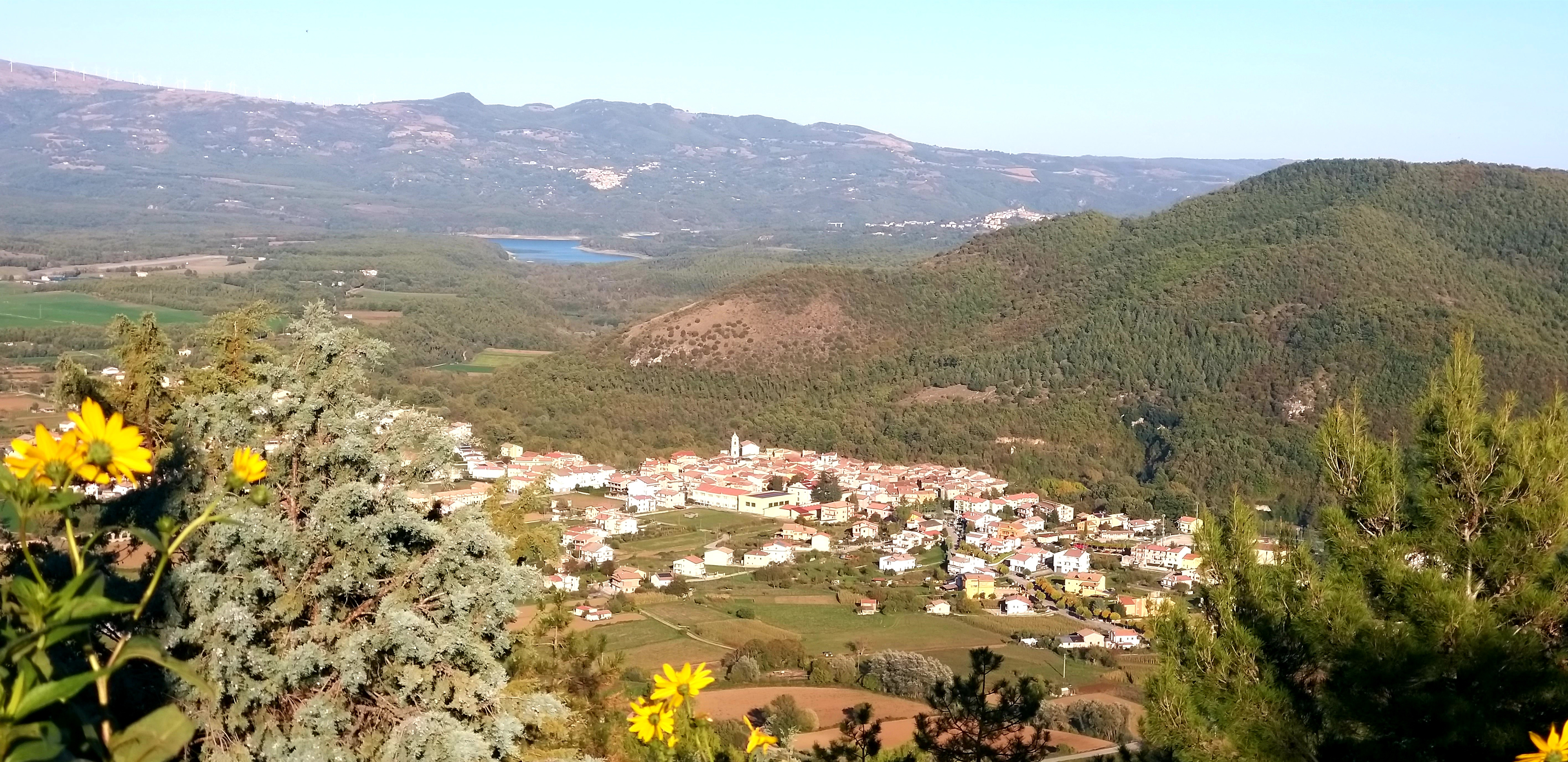
- View of Sarconi

- Coat of arms

- Location within Italy Location within Basilicata
- Coordinates: 40°15′N 15°53′E
- Country: Italy
- Region: Basilicata
- Province: Potenza (PZ)

Government
  - Mayor: Cesare Marte

Area
  - Total: 30.69 km^{2} (11.85 sq mi)
- Elevation: 636 m (2,087 ft)

Population (2026)
  - Total: 1,421
  - Density: 46.30/km^{2} (119.9/sq mi)
- Demonym: Sarconesi
- Time zone: UTC+1 (CET)
  - Summer (DST): UTC+2 (CEST)
- Postal code: 85040
- Dialing code: 0975
- ISTAT code: 076081
- Patron saint: St. Anthony of Padua
- Website: Official website

Sarconi (Lucano: Sarcùni) is a town and comune (municipality) in the Province of Potenza in the region of Basilicata in Italy. It has 1,421 inhabitants.

Sarconi borders the municipalities of Castelsaraceno, Grumento Nova, Moliterno, and Spinoso.

== Demographics ==
As of 2026, the population is 1,421, of which 51.9% are male, and 48.1% are female. Minors make up 12.9% of the population, and seniors make up 25.5%.

Historical population

Year	Pop.	±%
1861	1,134	—
1871	1,290	+13.8%
1881	1,232	−4.5%
1901	1,064	−13.6%
1911	919	−13.6%
1921	1,098	+19.5%
1931	1,160	+5.6%
1936	1,222	+5.3%

Year	Pop.	±%
1951	1,338	+9.5%
1961	1,326	−0.9%
1971	1,249	−5.8%
1981	1,206	−3.4%
1991	1,307	+8.4%
2001	1,351	+3.4%
2011	1,362	+0.8%
2021	1,406	+3.2%

Source: ISTAT

=== Immigration ===
As of 2025, of the known countries of birth of 1,369 residents, the most numerous are: Italy (1,258 – 91.9%), Bangladesh (40 – 2.9%), Romania (21 – 1.5%), Morocco (14 – 1%), India (10 – 0.7%).
