= Cacioricotta =

Italian cheese

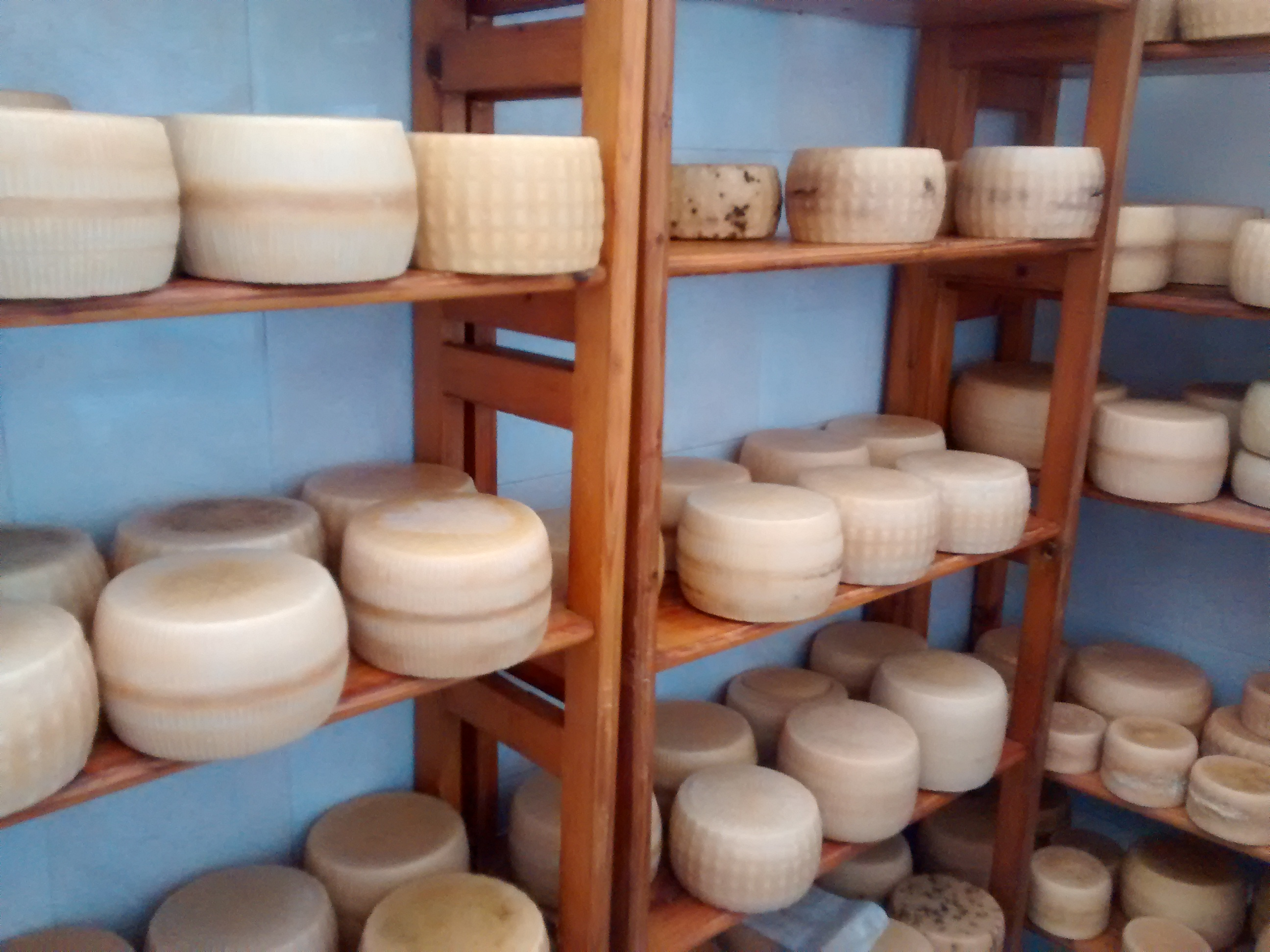
- Handmade cacioricotta cheeses in Puglia
- Place of origin: Italy
- Region or state: Basilicata; Apulia; Campania

Cacioricotta is a typical southern Italian cheese produced in the regions of Basilicata, Apulia and Calabria.

== Production method ==
Cacioricotta is produced with a "hybrid" method of preparation, following both the steps used in the production of ricotta as well as hard paste cheese. The cheese is usually made with sheep or goat milk, and more rarely with cow milk or water buffalo milk.

To manufacture the cheese filtered milk is heated up until it reaches its boiling point; the liquid is then left to cool until it reaches a temperature of 38–40°, rennet is then added. Due to the liquid reaching a temperature close to 90° whilst reaching its boiling point, curd, as well as casein and albumin, are integrated within the liquid, unlike ricotta where whey becomes a by-product.

== Acknowledgements and regional differences ==
Cacioricotta is recognised as a prodotto agroalimentare tradizionale (PAT), and has the following variants in these Italian regions:

Basilicata

- Cacioricotta

Calabria

- Cacioricotta

Campania

- Cacioricotta di capra cilentana

Lazio

- Cacioricotta di bufala

Apulia

- Cacioricotta salentina

== See also ==
- List of Italian cheeses
