= Apulian cuisine =

Culinary traditions of Apulia, Italy

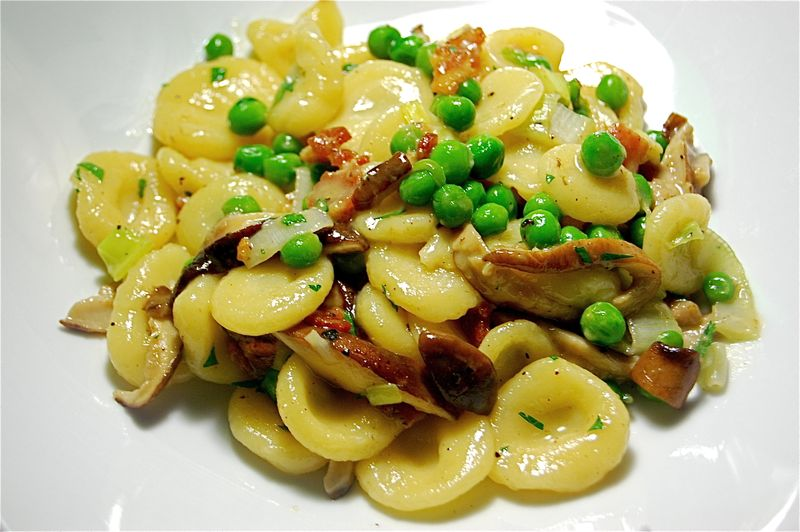
Orecchiette is the emblematic pasta shape of Apulia.

Apulian cuisine is characterized above all by the importance given to raw materials, both land and sea, and by the fact that all the ingredients are designed to enhance and not alter the basic flavours of the products used.

Therefore, it has a large variety of seasonal vegetables, legumes and seafood. Moreover, even if there are some common dishes, the recipes vary from province to province and, sometimes, from city to city: for example, the typical recipes of the provinces of Taranto, Brindisi and Bari, located on the sea, are not the same as those practiced in the province of Foggia, which is more hilly, and that of Lecce, which is more inland.

There are many recipes in this cuisine, which has a particularity that distinguishes it from others, that of offering different dishes in relation to the different seasons, so that during the milder seasons, that is in spring and summer, preference is given to vegetables, fish and seafood, while in the other seasons legumes predominate, as well as home-made pasta seasoned with various sauces, alone or combined with vegetables or fish.

== Overview ==
Apulia is a massive food producer; major production includes wheat, tomatoes, courgette, broccoli, bell peppers, potatoes, spinach, aubergines, cauliflower, fennel, endive, chickpeas, lentils, beans, and cheese (such as caciocavallo and the famous burrata). Apulia is also the largest producer of olive oil in Italy. The sea offers abundant fish and seafood that are extensively used in the regional cuisine, especially oysters, and mussels.

Goat and lamb are occasionally used. The region is known for pasta made from durum wheat and traditional pasta dishes featuring orecchiette-style pasta, often served with tomato sauce, potatoes, mussels or broccoli rabe. Pasta with cherry tomatoes and arugula is also popular.

Regional desserts include zeppole, doughnuts usually topped with powdered sugar and filled with custard, jelly, cannoli-style pastry cream or a butter-and-honey mixture. For Christmas, Apulians make a very traditional rose-shaped pastry called cartellate. These are fried or baked and dipped in vin cotto, which is either a wine or fig juice reduction.

Most famous street foods are focaccia barese (focaccia with fresh cherry tomatoes), panzerotto (a variant of the pizza that can be baked or fried) and rustico (puff pastry with tomato, bechamel and mozzarella cheese, popular especially in Lecce and Salento)

== Sagre food festivals ==
Apulia's sagre food festivals showcase local cuisine, cooking traditions and culture. While not unique to Apulia—sagre festivals are one of Italy's best kept food secrets—food is an integral part of the region's identity and these are intensely social occasions.

== History ==
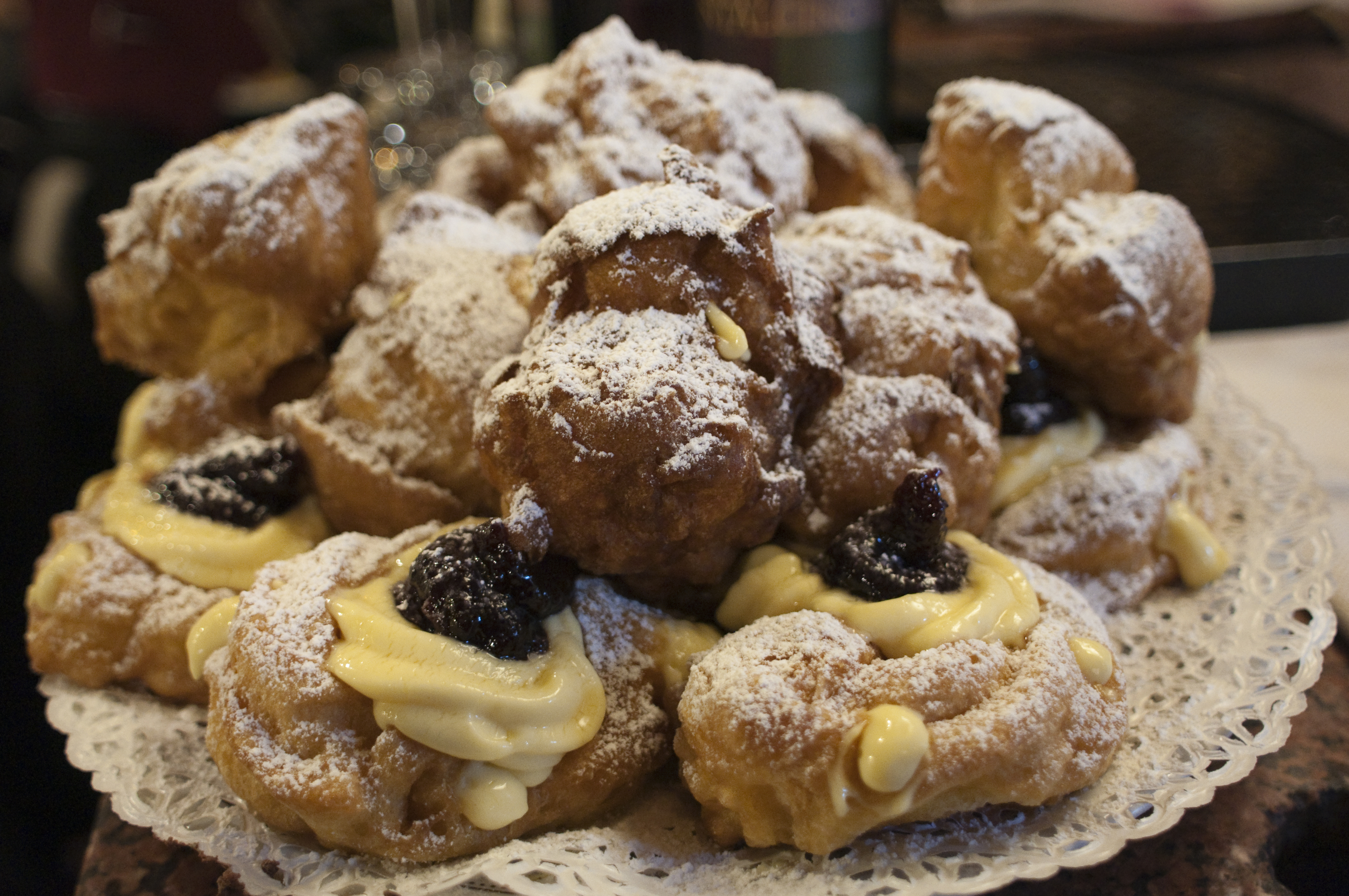
Zeppole

After the period of Magna Graecia, Apulia never had political autonomy. It was always a peripheral region of a larger state. From the Middle Ages until the Italian unification in the 19th century Apulia was controlled by the Kingdom of Naples and later the Kingdom of the Two Sicilies. It was governed from Naples in Campania, the capital of both kingdoms.

The nobility, which owned large tracts of land in Apulia, preferred to live in Naples. If they spent any time in Apulia, it was for brief inspections of their properties and the collection of profits. As a consequence the cuisine of the nobility started to disappear in Apulia during the 18th and 19th centuries. The cuisine of the monasteries, which were present in large numbers in Apulia, never became part of the local tradition. As charitable institutions which supported the poor, the food they served them was limited to soups.

Because of these factors, the cuisine of common people defines the gastronomy of Apulia. Historically Apulia was a poor region, which meant that ingredients had to be affordable, local and seasonal. Due to this frugality vegetables attained an important role. Dishes are simple, without elaborate preparations. The food of Apulia is often characterized as peasant food or cucina povera ('cuisine of the poor'). In spite of this, the dishes are richer and more complex than the number of ingredients and the simplicity of the cooking methods would suggest.

The first cookbook on Apulian cuisine was Libro de la Cocina from 1504, which covered the cooking of the nobility. It contains some recipes which are not Apulian, but which became part of the local tradition over time. This demonstrates that Apulians were eager to adopt cooking practices from other regions and integrate them into their own cuisine.

In modern times Apulian cuisine distinguishes between appetizers, first and second courses. Separate courses are a relatively new addition to the cuisine, because in the past a meal used to consist of a single dish. Many dishes now served as appetizers were inspired by single dishes which made up an entire meal. Some dishes which are now served as first courses can still be quite filling and rich in ingredients, which reflect their use as a single dish for the entire meal.

== Ingredients and dishes ==
=== Snacks and appetizers ===
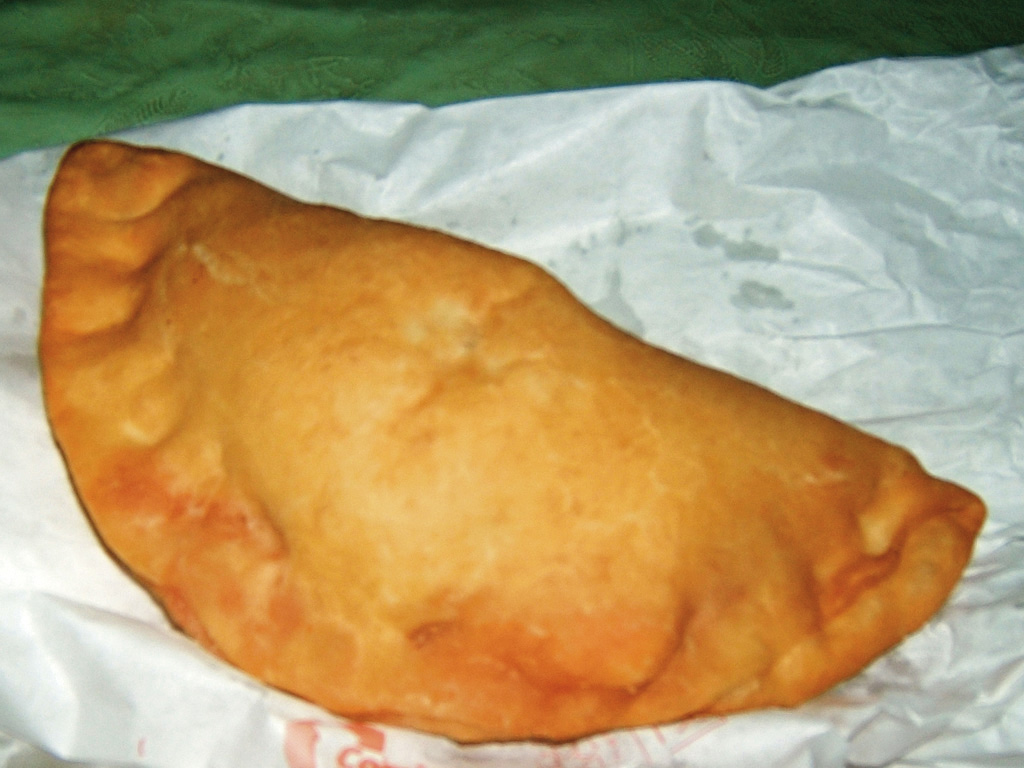
Panzerotto is a turnover, traditionally deep-fried and often filled with mozzarella and tomato.

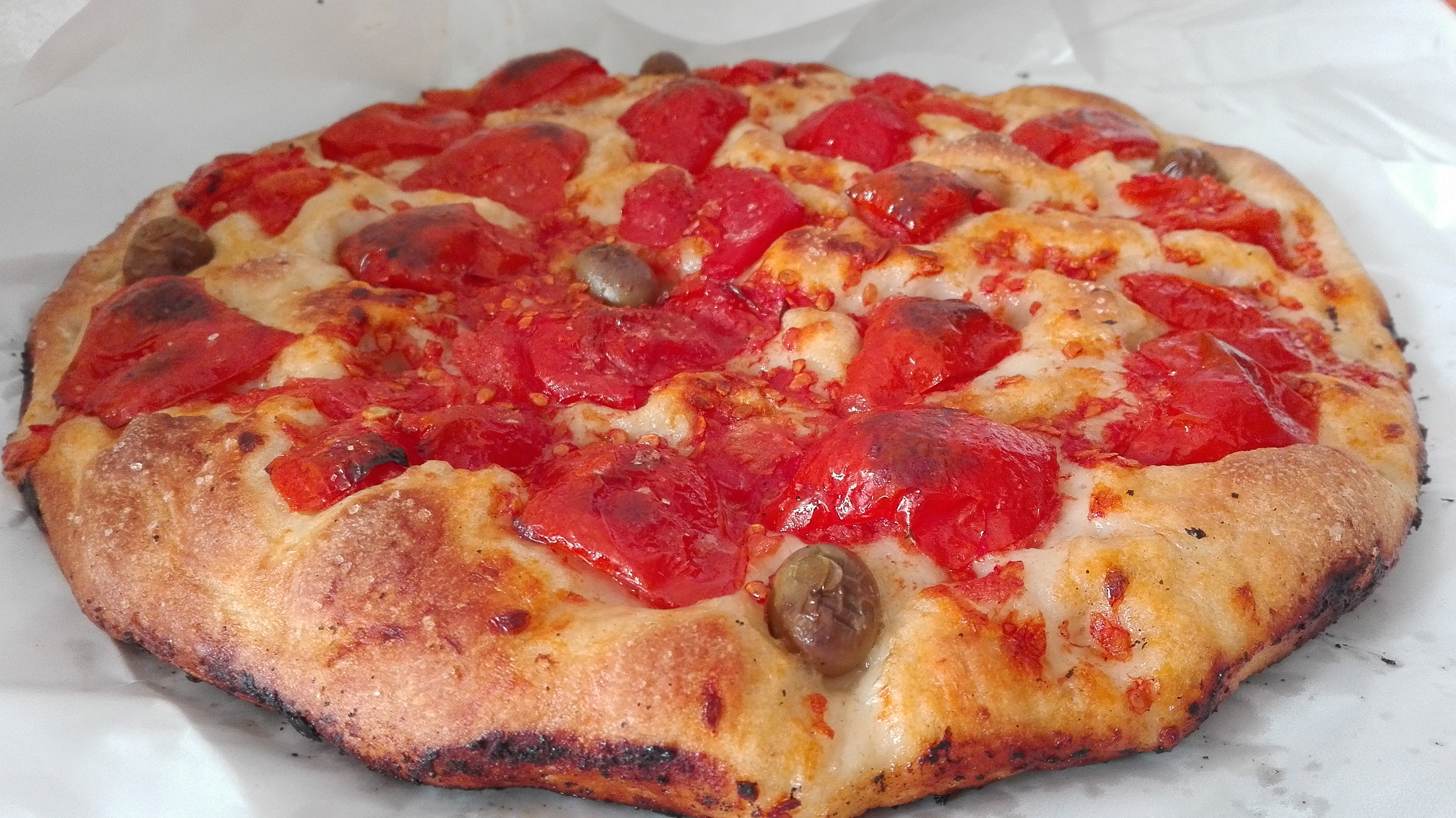
Focaccia Barese with tomatoes and olives

Many foods which are eaten as a snack or appetizer are based on bread. The puccia (plural pucce) is a small, flat and round bread which may or may not have olives mixed through its dough. The version with olives is eaten as is, but the version without olives is sliced open and stuffed with many kinds of vegetables, meat or seafood. The panzerotto is a turnover filled with various stuffings. A combination of tomatoes and mozzarella is popular. They are similar to the calzone of Naples, but are smaller and use a softer dough. They can be baked in the oven like calzone, but deep frying is traditional. Focaccia Barese is a local variation of focaccia originating from Bari, which is covered with tomatoes, oregano and optionally olives, with olive oil drizzled on top.

The rustico which is popular in the area of Lecce doesn't use bread but puff pastry as a base. The pastry is filled with béchamel sauce, mozzarella and tomato sauce and then baked in the oven. Scagliozzi may be the only popular way to eat polenta in Apulia. Polenta is prepared normally and then allowed to cool and dry. It is then cut in slices and deep fried. Pettole are deep-fried croquettes made from a liquid batter of flour with yeast, which may include boiled potatoes. There are both flavoured versions with small pieces of fish or vegetables and sweet versions.

Taralli are popular toroidal crackers made with flour, olive oil, white wine and salt along with other ingredients. The classical version uses fennel seeds, but they come in many variations and can be savoury or sweet. They are eaten as is or dunked in wine.

=== Bread ===
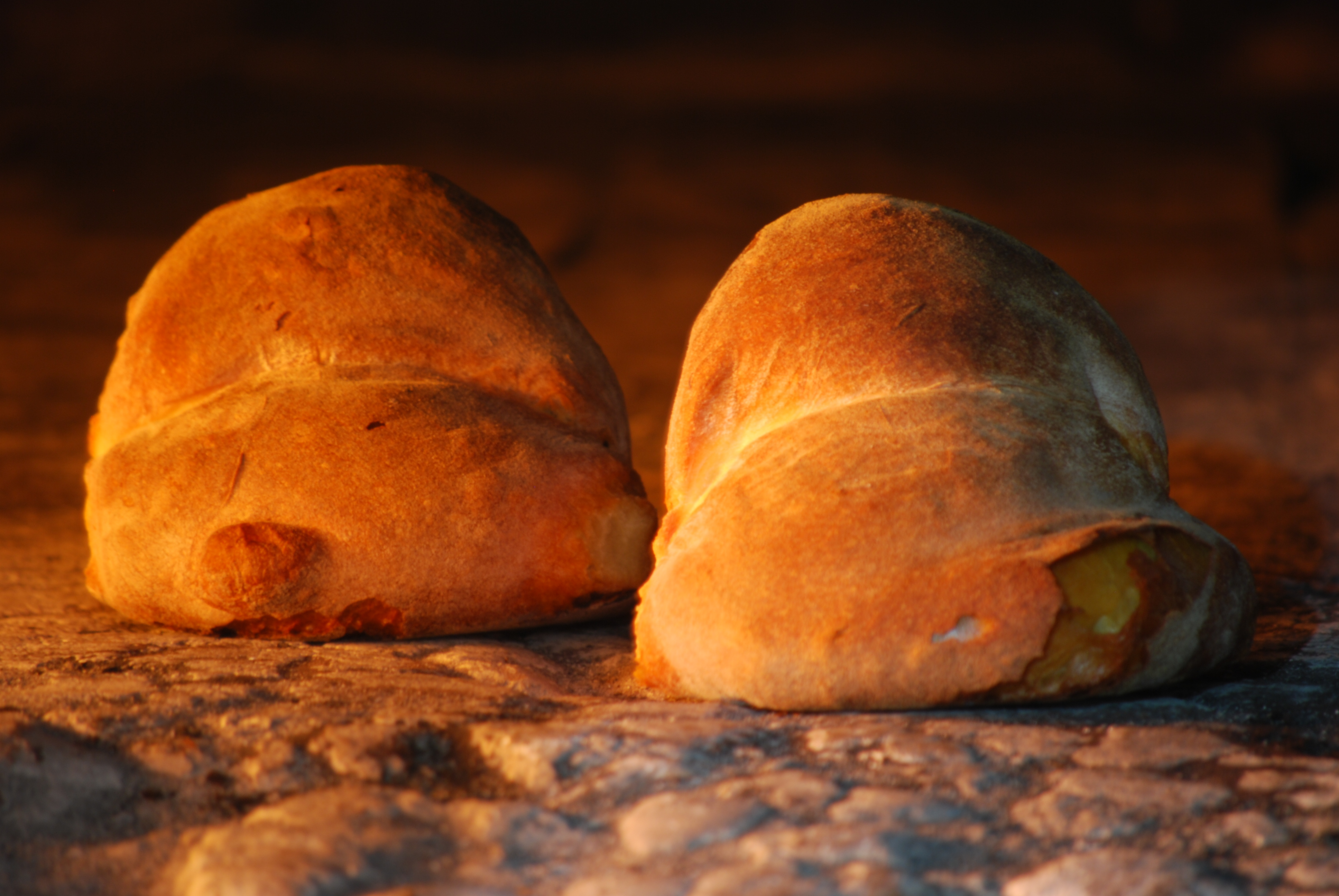
Pane di Altamura is bread made entirely of durum flour.

Bread is a very important part of the Apulian diet. The vast majority of wheat cultivated in Apulia is durum wheat, with minimal production of common wheat. For this reason many types of bread are made entirely or partially with durum wheat. The most highly regarded breads are Pane di Altamura, Pane di Laterza and Pane di Monte Sant'Angelo. Pane di Altamura was granted Protected Designation of Origin (PDO) status in the European Union (EU) and is made entirely with durum wheat flour, just like Pane di Laterza. Pane di Monte Sant'Angelo stands out because it is traditionally made with only common wheat flour.

Frisella is a bread with a long shelf life, making it a suitable alternative to fresh bread. It has a toroidal shape with a hole in the center, which facilitated stringing them together for storage and transport. The dough is made with either wheat, durum or barley flour. After a first stage of baking in the oven, the friselle is cut horizontally and then baked in the oven again until they are completely dry. Before consumption the friselle is soaked in water until it is still crisp but not mushy. It is then eaten with a variety of toppings.

Instead of disposing of stale bread, Apulians have invented many dishes to make it palatable. Cialledda, also called aquasale, is one of these. After soaking bread in water to soften it, it is combined with tomatoes, olive oil and salt. The dish pancotto is similar, but more elaborate with more ingredients. Stale bread is also used to make dry breadcrumbs which can be used a garnish for several dishes.

=== Cheese ===
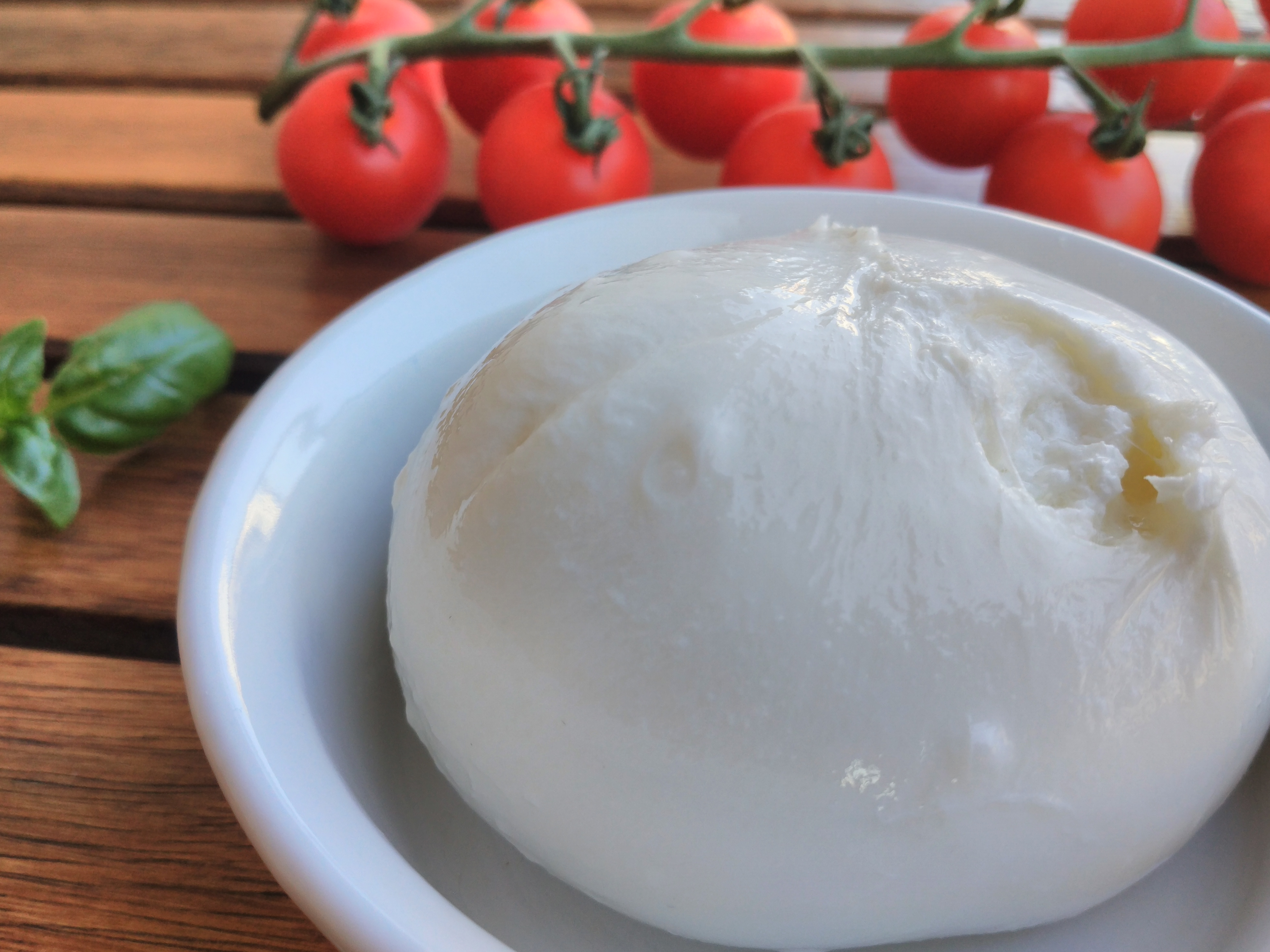
Burrata

The cheese from Apulia which is most popular internationally is the fresh cheese burrata. This cheese consists of an outer shell of mozzarella which is filled with stracciatella and cream. Only burrata di Andria is protected under the Protected Geographical Indication (PGI) status by the EU, so the generic name is also used for burrata produced outside Apulia. The PDO cheeses of Apulia are the aged caciocavallo Silano, canestrato Pugliese and fresh mozzarella di bufala Campana. Other cheeses include caciocavallo podolico, cacioricotta Pugliese, pallone di Gravina and several varieties of ricotta, of which ricotta forte has an especially strong flavor.

=== Fruit ===
Just like other regions in Southern Italy, olive oil is the principal cooking fat. While table olives are now frequently served as appetizers, they were even more important in the past as they were often the only available food next to bread. Apulia is Italy's largest producer of olive oil and table olives, with many local varieties. Five of these oils and one table olive, respectively the Collina di Brindisi, Dauno, Terra di Bari, Terra d'Otranto, Terre Tarentine and La Bella della Daunia, are protected under the PDO status.

Many different sweet fruits are enjoyed as a dessert at the end of a meal. The arancia del Gargano and clementine del Golfo di Taranto are respectively an orange and clementine which enjoy PDO status. The limone femminello del Gargano is a lemon with PGI status. The fruit of the prickly pear cactus which dots the countryside is consumed as well.

=== Soups ===
Soups are especially popular as winter dishes, with a main role for vegetables along with legumes and short pasta shapes. Bread is often included as well, either on the side or included in the soup. The bread dishes cialledda and pancotto may also be prepared in the form of a soup if a vegetable broth is added. A soup from the Salento is called cecamariti, literally meaning 'blinding the husband'. The dish received its name from its impressive appearance, which conceals its easy preparation. There are also fish soups, which feature a rich broth due to the addition of small fish with bones included.

=== Pasta ===
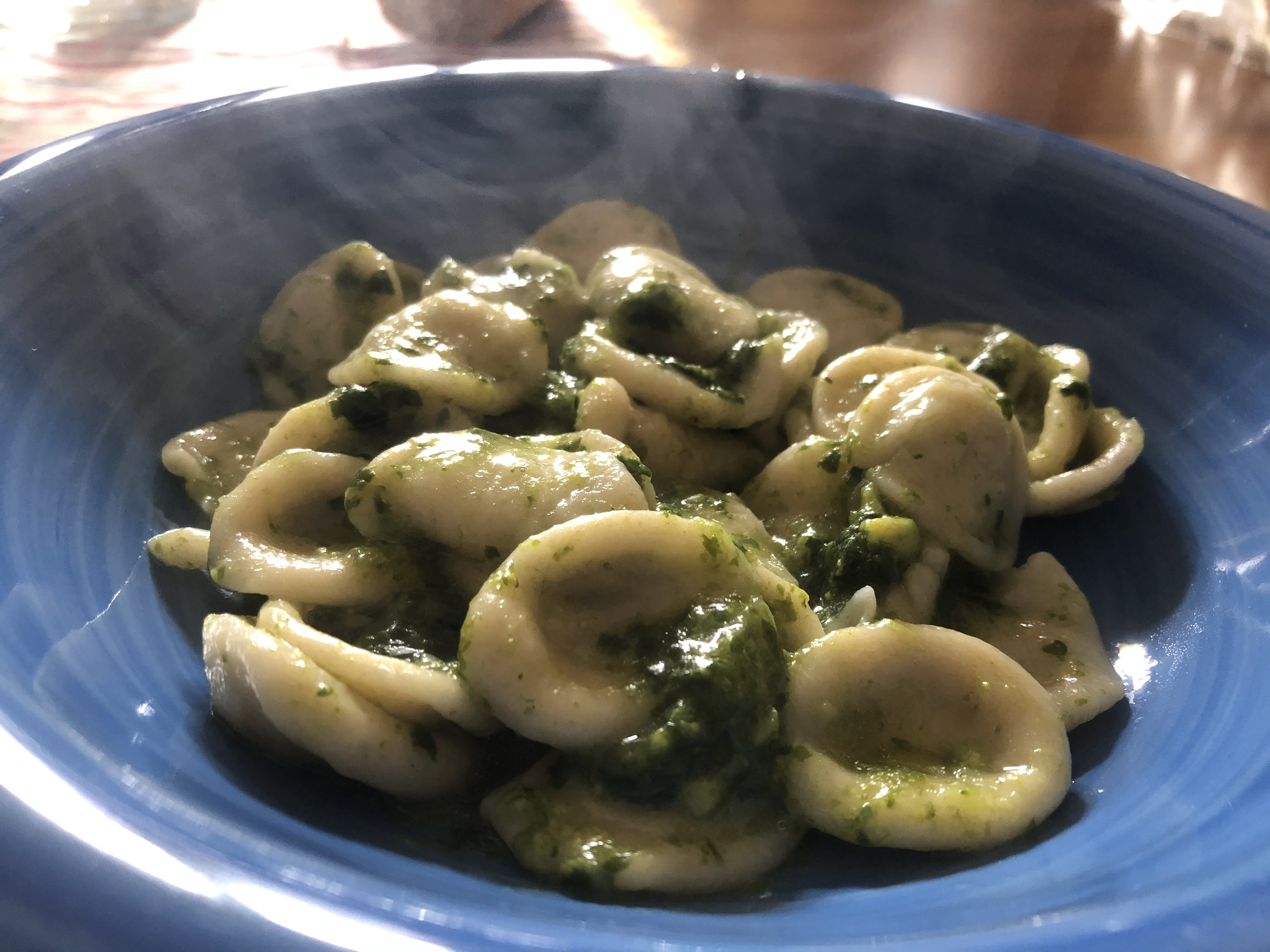
Orecchiette with cime di rapa sauce

Eggs are an essential ingredient for pasta in Northern Italy, but in Apulia and other regions of Southern Italy only semolina and water is used. This was done mainly for economic reasons, because eggs were considered too valuable for an everyday dish like pasta. Omitting eggs from pasta dough allowed their use in other dishes.

Orecchiette is considered the signature pasta shape of Apulia, but there are many other shapes as well. These include cavatelli, capunti (typical of the Murgia plateau), troccoli (from the Daunia), lagane and sagne. Orecchiette is frequently combined with fried cime di rape. Next to the familiar combinations of pasta with tomato sauces, meat and seafood, there are some typically Apulian pairings with vegetables. For example, the dish ciceri e tria uses chickpeas and lagane con puré di fave uses broad bean puree.

Pasta can also be made with grano arso, 'burnt grain'. In the past the remaining ears of grains would be gathered from the grain fields after the grain harvest, when the grain stubbles were burnt to clear the field. While this used to be done out of extreme poverty or frugality, pasta made with grano arso is now considered a delicacy.

=== Vegetables ===
Broad beans and cime di rape are the iconic vegetables of Apulia. The broad bean has been the staple food in the region for thousands of years. In its dried and split form it is the main ingredient of the famous dish fave e cicoria. Other frequently used vegetables include fennel, zucchini, artichoke, bell pepper, cauliflower, eggplant, wild leaf chicory, the cardoncello mushroom and broccoli. The carciofo Brindisino and lenticchia di Altamura are respectively artichokes and lentils which have attained the PGI status from the EU.

Many vegetables are preserved with the sott'olio method, meaning 'under the oil'. First vegetables are boiled in white wine vinegar. After they are combined with spices and herbs they are placed in jars. The vegetables are then covered by filling the jar with olive oil, so that they are not in contact with air. This allows the vegetables to be preserved for up to year and also enhances their flavor.

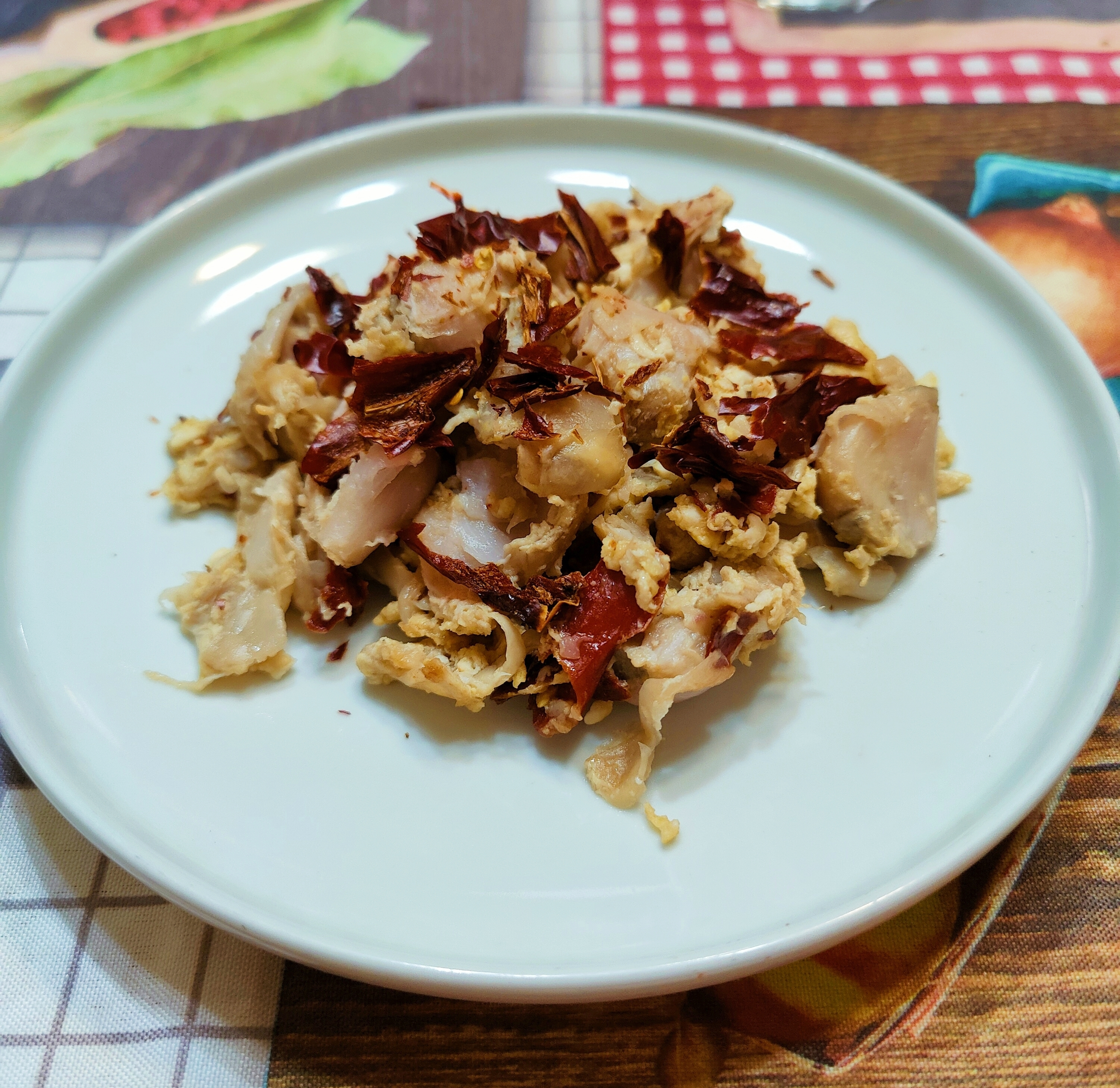
Lampascioni salade

Apulian cooking also uses some less widely known vegetables. The tassel hyacinth grows widespread in the wild and is used for its bulb. Known as lampascioni in Apulia, these are usually boiled in water and seasoned with olive oil, vinegar, salt and black pepper. They can also be grilled or deep-fried.

The black chickpea (ceci neri) was consumed more often before the 1950s, but production dropped as it was replaced by more profitable crops and legumes with shorter cooking times. Today production is centered in the Murgia plateau. Because they have a stronger taste than the white variety, they are often just boiled in water and served with oil, possibly combined with a small type of pasta.

The grass pea (cicerchia) used to be popular in cookbooks of the 1600s, but has since fallen out of favor because the plant provides a limited yield and is toxic if eaten as a staple. In recent times the crop has been rediscovered and is cultivated in the Alta Murgia and the Salento. It is used in soups and stews.

=== Seafood ===
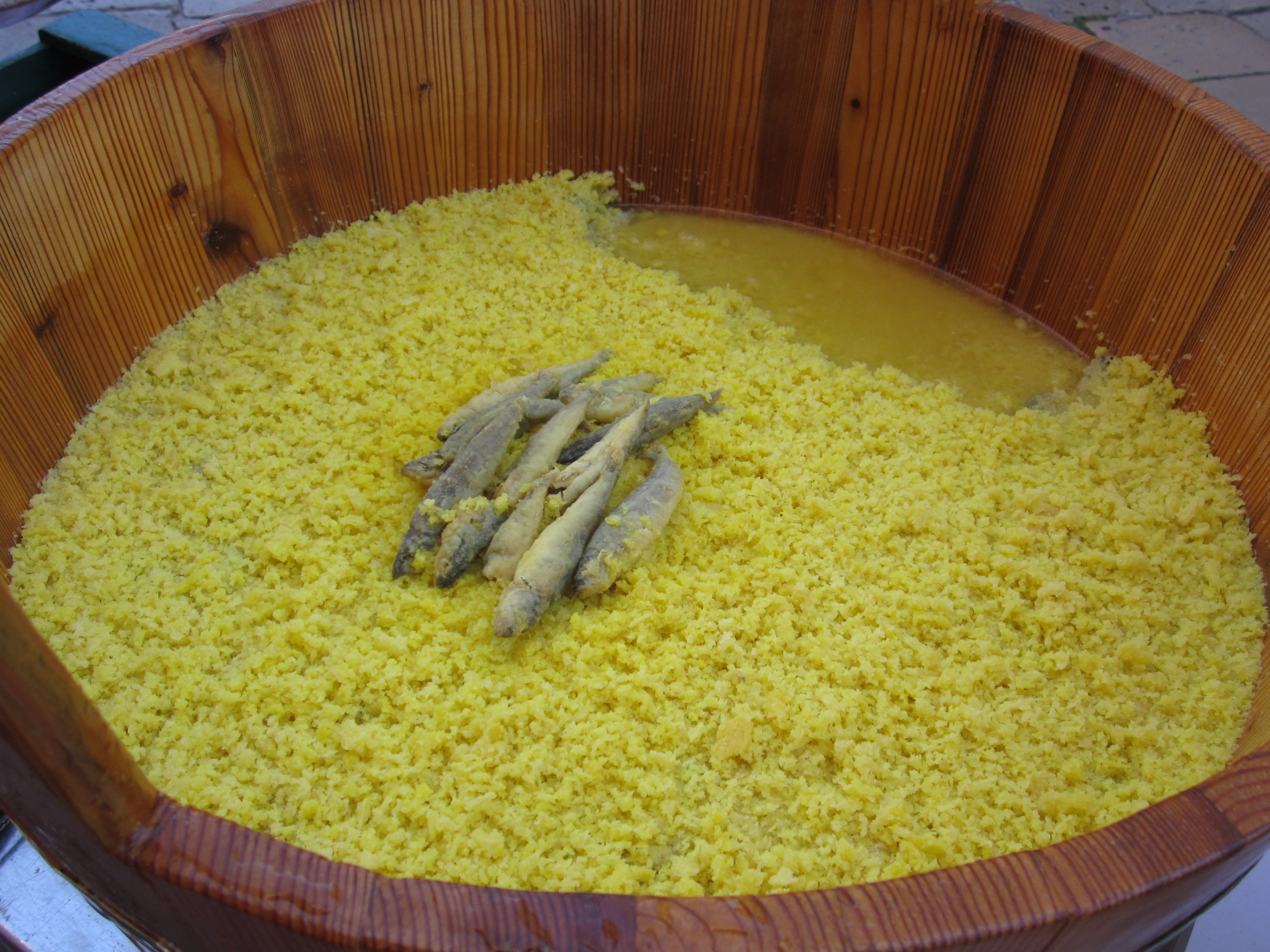
Scapece from Gallipoli is fried fish preserved in red wine vinegar with breadcrumbs and saffron.

Because Apulia is a peninsula, it has a long coastline and the sea is never far away. This has made seafood an important part of its cuisine. The large variety of seafood that is available includes sea bream, octopus, prawns, oysters, anchovies, mussels and clams. The region has been compared with Japan for its love of raw fish.

One of the more popular dishes is tiella, a slow-cooked dish layered with rice, potatoes and mussels. This version originates from Bari, but there is plenty of local variation in the recipe, with different versions originating from Foggia, Taranto and the Salento. Some of these don't even include seafood. Scapece is a fish dish from Gallipoli, Apulia which is notable for its preservation method. Similar to escabeche, fish is fried and then preserved in red wine vinegar with breadcrumbs and saffron to greatly extend its shelf life. Some dishes use dried and salted cod (baccalà) like Baccalà in umido alla pugliese, one of the very few imported ingredients. Mussels are the most used seafood, especially in Taranto, with mussles are prepared dishes like Cozze gratinate, Spaghetti con le cozze, Tubettini con le cozze, Impepata di cozze (Peppered mussles) etc...

=== Meat ===
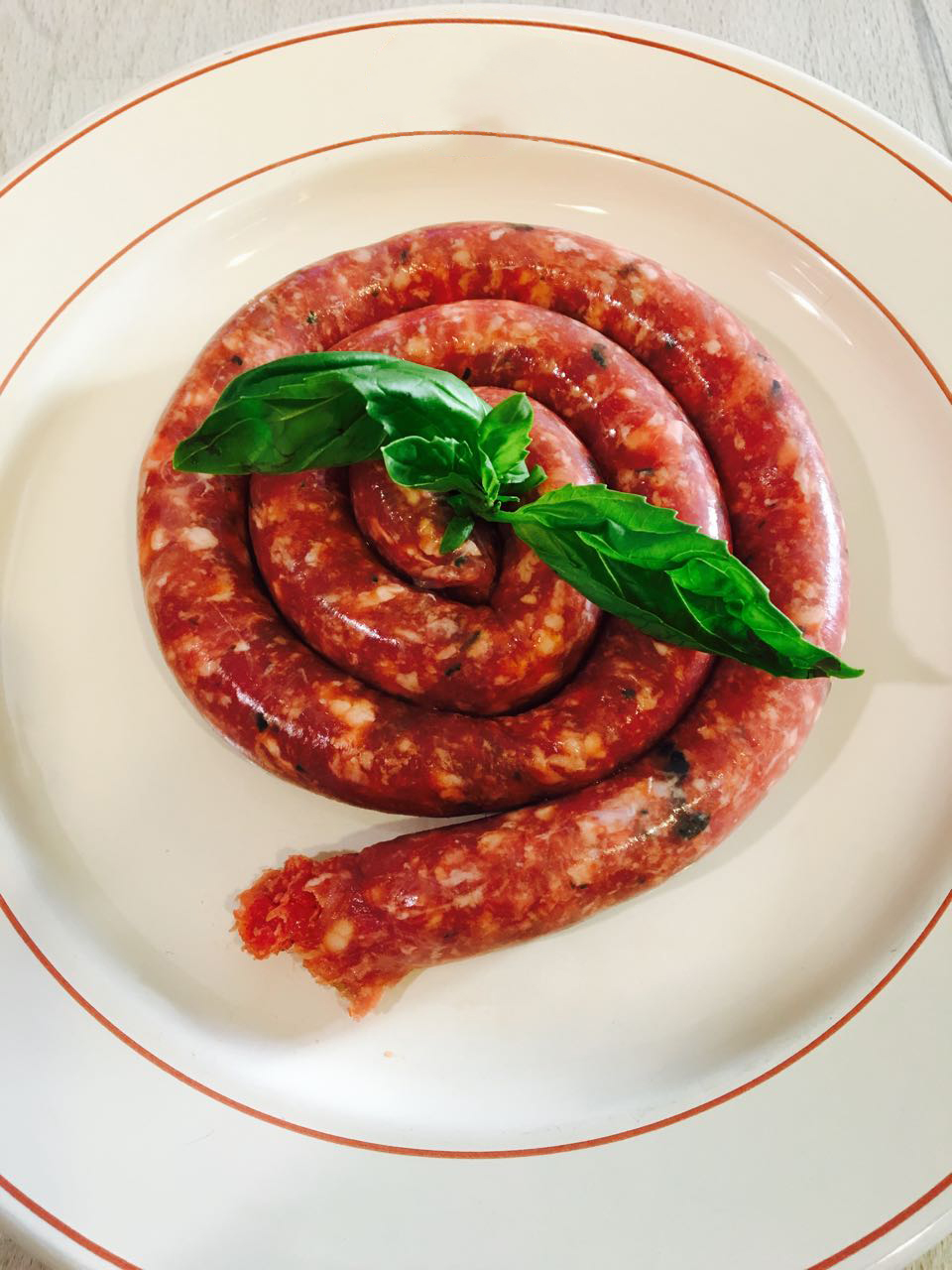
Zampina

In the past meat was a scarcity due to its expense. For this reason, it is not an important component of the cuisine of Apulia. Beef was lacking almost entirely from the diet in the past, because cattle was used for farm work or reared for milk. It was slaughtered only when it was very old. Likewise, the prevalence of horse meat is explained by the slaughter of lame horses which were no longer able to work. Lamb, poultry and rabbit (often reared on farms) and to a lesser degree game were the main sources of meat. A farm used to raise a single pig, of which every part would be used when it was slaughtered. Some of its meat would be consumed directly, but most of it would be preserved as ham and sausages, such as capocollo di Martina Franca, prosciutto di Faeto, soppressata di Martina Franca and zampina.

The Apulian recipe for ragù differs from the version prepared in other Italian regions. Traditionally it uses sun-dried tomato pulp (conserva) as a base, which is then fried in olive oil with some water, fresh tomatoes and optionally chili pepper and red wine. Then meat braciole (or involtini) are added, which can be used together with the sauce to dress pasta dishes. Apart from quality cuts of meat, there are also recipes which call for offal in the form of roulades and pig's trotters. In Puglia, there is an ancient tradition of horse butchery, often managed by the Roma communities in the south of the region (provinces of Taranto and Lecce). But even in Bari, a typical dish is pasta (often orecchiette) with horse meat braciole.

=== Sweets ===
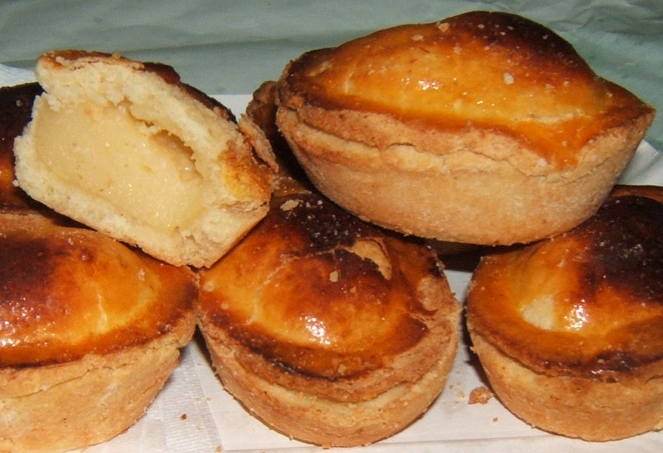
Pasticciotti filled with custard

The ingredients for sweets are sometimes influenced by the Middle East and include almonds, figs, hazelnuts, pistachios and spices. The traditional sweetener is honey, which is still frequently used. Fresh soft ricotta is used as well.

Pasticciotto is a type of filled Apulian pastry. Depending on the region, they are traditionally filled with either ricotta cheese or egg custard. Pasticciotti are approximately 1 inch (2.5 cm) thick. They are typically served as a breakfast item, but may also be eaten throughout the day, and are a traditional pastry in Apulia. According to a number of sources, pasticciotti should be eaten warm.

Zeppole are Italian pastries consisting of a deep-fried dough ball of varying size but typically about 4 inches (10 cm) in diameter. These fritters are usually topped with powdered sugar, and may be filled with custard, jelly, cannoli-style pastry cream or a butter-and-honey mixture. The consistency ranges from light and puffy, to bread- or pasta-like. They are eaten to celebrate Saint Joseph's Day, which is a Catholic feast day. Zeppole are typical of Italian cuisine, especially that of Rome, Naples, and Lecce.

== Wine ==
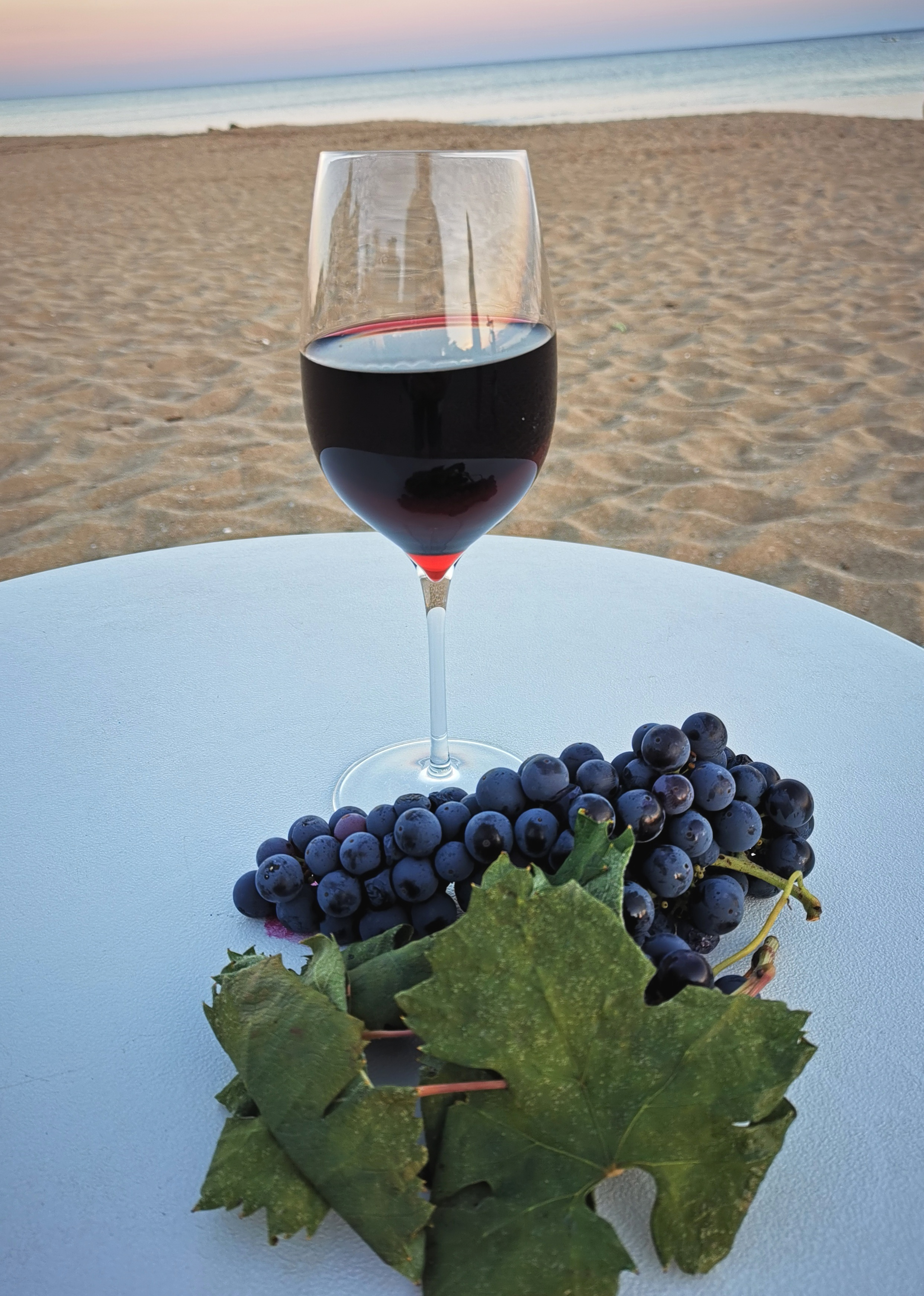
A glass of Primitivo di Manduria wine

In 2017 Apulia overtook Veneto as the largest wine producing region in Italy, with a total production of 9.070.112 hectoliters. It has been producing grapes with a high alcohol content for ages, which were used by other regions in Italy and France for mixing with their own wines. Since the 1990s Apulian winemakers have started taking more risks and using more innovative winemaking techniques. Today it produces wines with many different indigenous grape varieties. The most well-known wine internationally is Primitivo di Manduria, but there are many other varieties such as the Negroamaro, Bombino Bianco, Pampanuto, Verdeca, Bianco d'Alessano and Susumaniello.

== See also ==
- Italian cuisine
- Cuisine of Abruzzo
- Arbëreshë cuisine
- Emilian cuisine
- Cuisine of Liguria
- Lombard cuisine
- Cuisine of Mantua
- Cuisine of Basilicata
- Neapolitan cuisine
- Piedmontese cuisine
- Roman cuisine
- Cuisine of Sardinia
- Sicilian cuisine
- Tuscan cuisine
- Venetian cuisine
- Culture in Apulia
- Barese ragù

== Sources ==
- Ersetti, Dario (February 2018a). "Pasta with black chick peas from the Foggia Murge". Bridge Puglia USA. Archived from the original on 26 December 2015.
- Ersetti, Dario (February 2018b). "Puccia, pizzi and other delicacies". Bridge Puglia USA. Archived from the original on 27 December 2015.
- Ersetti, Dario (February 2018c). "Lecce's "rustico"". Bridge Puglia USA. Archived from the original on 26 December 2015.
- Ersetti, Dario (February 2018d). "The scapece of Gallipoli". Bridge Puglia USA. Archived from the original on 12 August 2020.
- Formisano, Luigi (February 2018). "Cicerchia: In pursuit of old-time flavors". Bridge Puglia USA. Archived from the original on 26 December 2015.
- "Crops: Cereals and legumees, roots, bulbs and tubers". Istat. 2019.
- "Crops: Grapes, wine, olives, oil". Istat. 2018.
- Lorusso, Luca; Polak, Vivienne (2015). Sharing Puglia. Melbourne: Hardie Grant Books. ISBN 9781742708485.
- Piras, Claudia; Medagliani, Eugenio (2000). Culinaria Italy. Könemann Verlagsgesellschaft mbh. ISBN 3-8290-2901-2.
- Pizzillo, Michele (12 July 2002). "Aria del Gargano, sale marino nasce il pane di Monte Sant'Angelo". La República (in Italian).
- Russo, William dello (2016). Puglia in Cucina: The Flavours of Apulia. Sime Books. ISBN 9788895218199.
- Sbisà, Nicola (2009). Savour Apulia: Traditional Recipes. Bari: Mario Adda Editore. ISBN 9788880828099.
- Schneider, Linda (16 January 2018). "A New Chickpea From the Old World". TASTE.
