= Pizza puff =

Filled deep-fried dough pocket

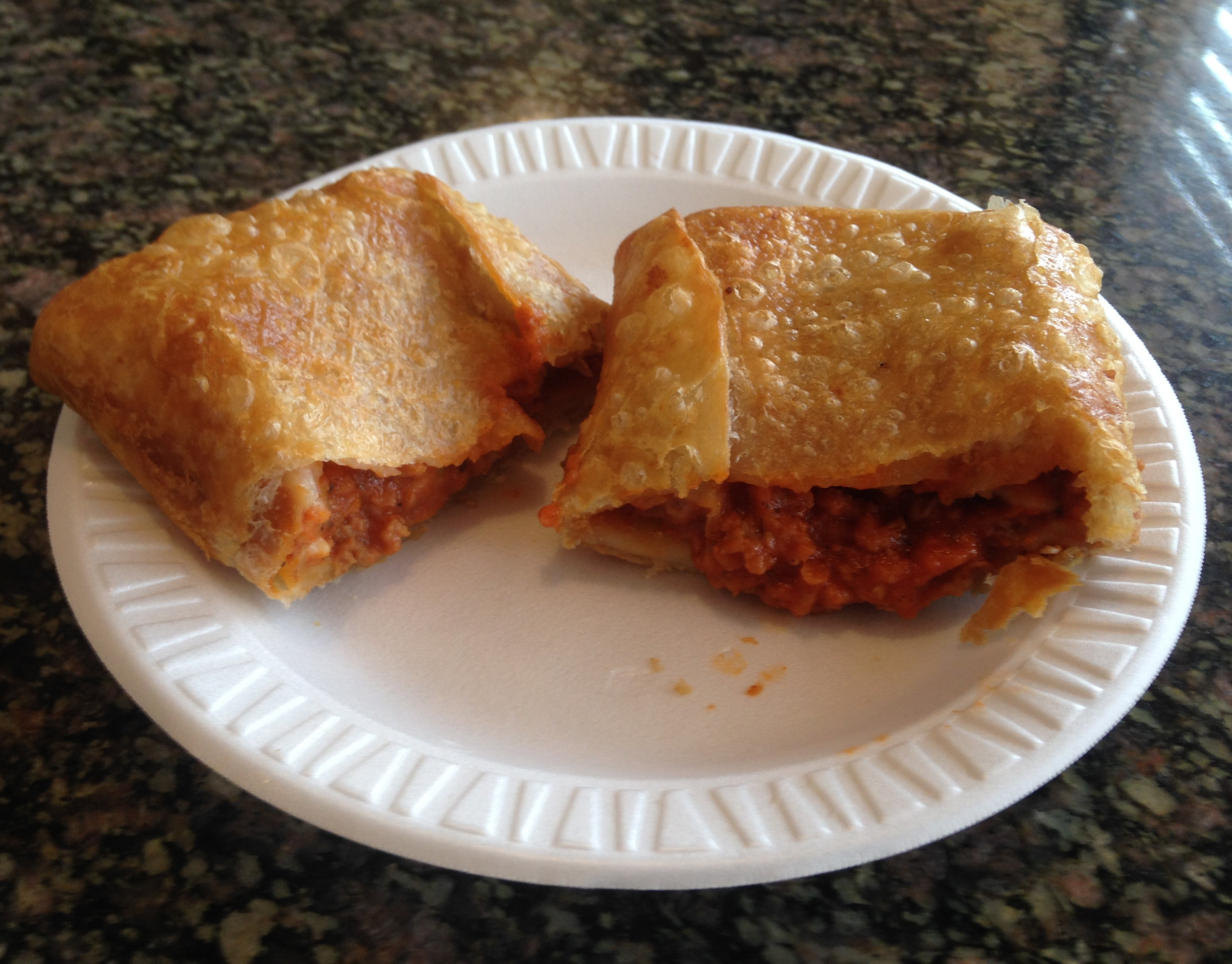
An Iltaco pizza puff

A pizza puff is a deep-fried dough pocket filled with cheese, tomato sauce, and other pizza ingredients such as sausage or pepperoni. Originally from Chicago, pizza puffs can be found at many casual dining restaurants there.

Pizza puffs are similar to panzerotti. They are also somewhat like calzones, but calzones are baked instead of fried, and do not always include tomato sauce.

Some Italian restaurants and casual dining establishments make their own pizza puffs from scratch. These pizza puffs feature a pizza dough wrapper, and tend to be somewhat larger than the pre-made ones.

== Commercial varieties ==
Some hot dog stands in the Chicago area serve mass-produced pizza puffs that they purchase from the Iltaco company. The frozen pizza puffs are deep-fried before serving. The dough wrapper of these pizza puffs is similar to a flour tortilla. Iltaco was founded in 1927 and was originally called the Illinois Tamale Company ("Il-Ta-Co"). It has been suggested that Iltaco invented the pizza puff. Iltaco pizza puffs are also sold in the frozen food section of some local area grocery stores.

Arco Frozen Foods is another company that mass-produced pizza puffs, and introduced a retail pizza puff circa 1968.

== See also ==
- List of deep fried foods
- Panzerotti
