= Panzerotti =

Baked Italian pizza dish

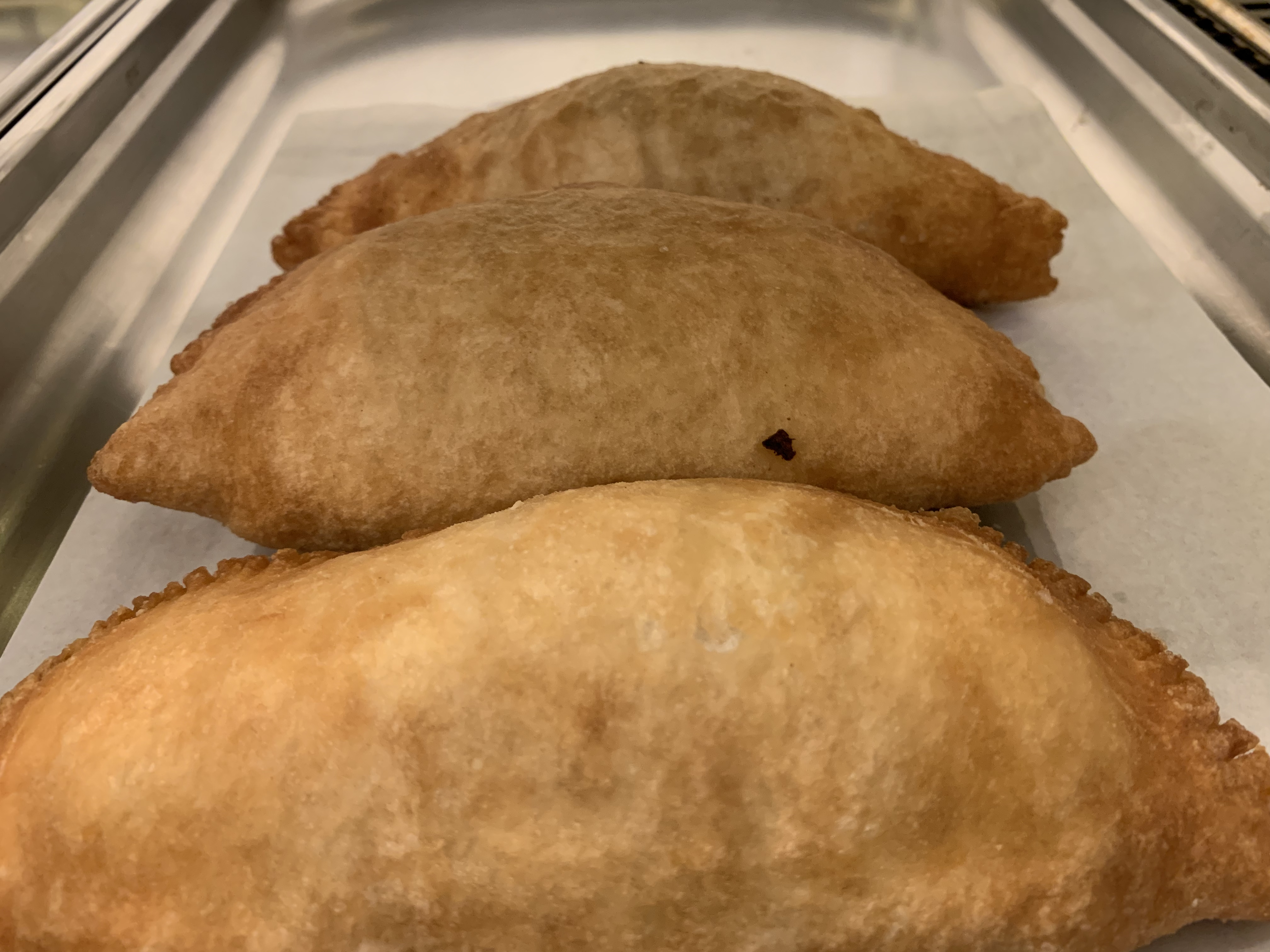
- Three panzerotti
- Alternative names: Panzerotto (Italian singular form), panzarotto (Italian singular form)
- Type: Folded pizza
- Place of origin: Italy
- Region or state: Apulia
- Main ingredients: Tomato sauce, mozzarella
- Similar dishes: Pizza fritta

Panzerotti, (Note: Italian: [pantseˈrɔtti]; sing.: panzerotto [pantseˈrɔtto]) also known as panzarotti, (Note: Italian: [pantsaˈrɔtti]; sing.: panzarotto [pantsaˈrɔtto]) are Italian savory bread products, originating in the Apulia region, which resemble small calzones, both in shape and in the dough used for their preparation. The term panzerotti applies exclusively to a fried product, though oven-baked calzones are similar and the two are often mistaken for each other.

== Etymology ==
The noun panzerotto comes from a diminutive of panza, a regional variation of Italian pancia (lit. 'belly' or 'tummy'), referring to the distinctive swelling of the pastry which resembles a belly bloating.

== Origin and variations ==
Panzerotti originated in Apulian cuisine. They are basically small versions of calzones, but are usually fried rather than oven-baked, which is why they are also known as calzoni fritti (lit. 'fried calzones') or pizze fritte (lit. 'fried pizzas') in Italy, most typically in Campania. In parts of Apulia, such as Molfetta, panzerotti also go by the name of frittelle or frittelli (lit. 'fritters'), while in Brindisi they are known as fritte (a local variation of frittelle).

The most common fillings for this turnover are tomato and mozzarella. Peeled whole tomatoes are drained and dried to be used as a filling, as using non-dried tomatoes will cause the dough to rip due to the moisture. Other fillings are onions sauteed in olive oil and seasoned with salted anchovies and capers, or mortadella and provolone cheese.

A different recipe for panzerotti is panzerotti di patate (lit. 'potato panzerotti'), a specialty from Salento which consists of mashed potato croquettes rather than panzerotti as the term is most typically intended.

== See also ==
Media related to Panzerotti at Wikimedia Commons

- Calzone
- Deep fried pizza
- U' pastizz 'rtunnar
