= Ferrovia cherry =

Cherry cultivar

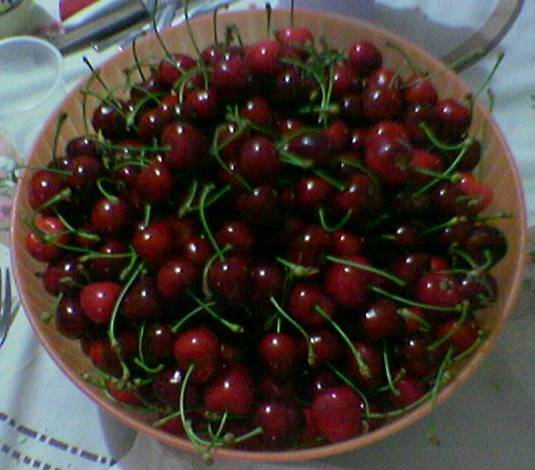
- Genus: Prunus
- Species: Prunus avium
- Cultivar: Ferrovia
- Origin: Apulia, Italy

Ferrovia (Italian: ciliegia ferrovia, lit. 'railway cherry') is a cultivar of sweet cherry originating in Italy, where it is the most important variety in the Apulia growing region.

== History and name ==
There are multiple stories of the origin of the Ferrovia cultivar. One version states that it originated on a small farm in Turi, where two local farmers, Giovanni Arrè and Matteo Di Venere, cultivated the original tree from a seed left over from a meal. When the fruit of this tree proved popular, it was extensively grafted by other farmers in the region and became widespread. In another version, the tree received its name because it was first discovered growing near a railway line between Turi and Sammichele di Bari. The Ferrovia is the most widely grown cherry in Italy, and is also grown in northern Greece.

It has been suggested that the Ferrovia cherry is derived from 'Schneiders', an old German sweet cherry cultivar.

== Tree characteristics ==
The Ferrovia cherry tree is vigorous and upright to spreading, reaching a height of 10 meters. It produces white flowers in the spring and has dark green foliage. It is self-incompatible and requires a pollinator.

== Fruit ==
The fruit of the Ferrovia cherry tree is ready for harvest in mid-May to early June. The fruits are very large, slightly pointed, and bright red, with a crunchy texture.
