= Grano arso =

Form of wheat found in Italian cuisine

Grano arso (literally "burnt grain" in Italian) is wheat which has been charred before being milled. It is popular in Italian cuisine.

== Meaning ==
Grano arso means "burnt grain" in Italian.

== History ==
According to Missy Robbins grano arso originated in the southern Italian region of Apulia and was a low-quality product eaten out of necessity, which later became trendy.

== Description ==
Grano arso is dark-colored and has a smokey flavor. It is also described as having nutty notes.

== Use ==
It is often mixed with normal flour to cut its bold flavor. It is generally used to make pasta.

== See also ==
- Apulian cuisine
- Parched grain
- Gofio
