= Tiella =

Italian dish

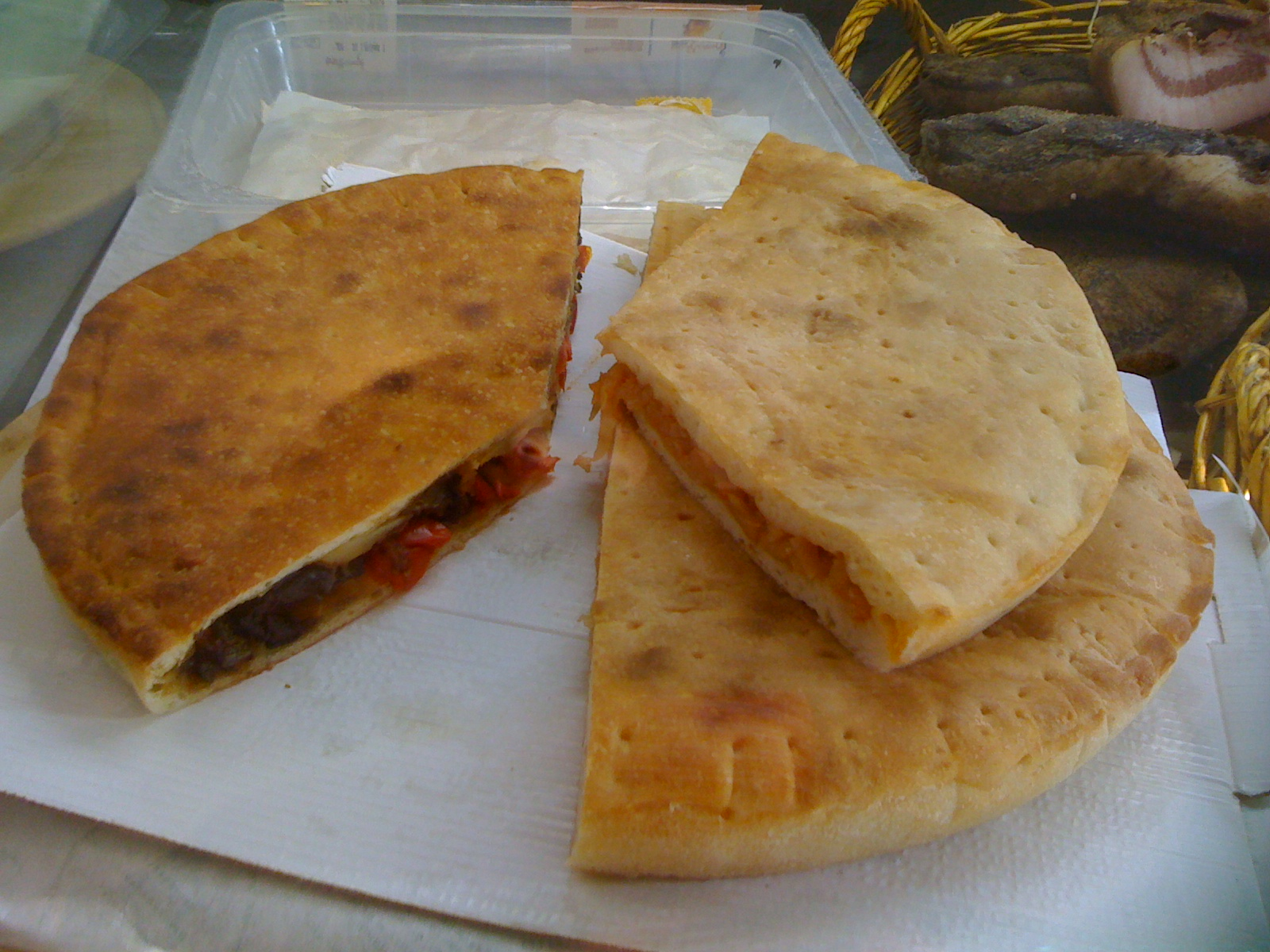
Tiella di Gaeta is prepared in the style of a pocket sandwich.

Tiella is an Italian dish prepared with potato, rice, onion and mussels as primary ingredients; additional ingredients may be used. Variations of the dish exist, some of which may be prepared with other types of seafood. Tiella is part of Apulian cuisine. It may also be found in coastal areas of the Calabria region. The round earthenware dish in which tiella is traditionally cooked is also referred to as tiella.

In the comune (municipality) of Gaeta, Lazio, tiella is a specialty dish of the region prepared in the style of a pocket sandwich, using seafood such as octopus that is stuffed within a cake. Some other Italian dishes also referred to as tiella include a casserole and a stew.

== Origin ==
In Italy, the dish originated during the time of Spanish rule in southern Italy, and it has been described as being "reminiscent of Spanish rule". Waverley Root described tiella as "one of the few Spanish dishes which have been taken into the Italian repertory" and considered it was distantly related to paella. Potatoes entered Italian cuisine during the 16th century, a time of powerful Spanish influence in the peninsula.

== Tiella with potato, rice, onion and mussels ==
=== Ingredients and preparation ===
Primary ingredients used in this dish are potatoes, rice, onions, and mussels. Additional ingredients used in its preparation may include tomato, artichoke, courgettes, garlic, white wine, celery, parsley, breadcrumbs and cheese, such as pecorino. It is typically baked in an oven, and has been described as similar in appearance to paella. Some versions omit the use of rice. The mussels are "traditionally served on the half shell", and may be steamed prior to being added to the dish for baking.

Tiella has been described as a "hearty dish", typical of the regional cooking of Apulia. Fresh vegetables from this region may be used in tiella's preparation there. Apulian tiella typically includes a significant amount of potatoes. Tiella has also been described as a casserole.

The dish may be cooked in a terracotta or earthenware glazed ceramic round dish that is also called a tiella. Contemporary preparations may be cooked in metal pans.

=== Variations ===
Apulian versions of the dish may use rice and potato, along with white wine to steam the mussels in, pecorino cheese, breadcrumbs and parsley.

Some versions may be prepared with other types of seafood, such as sardines.

== Other types ==
Italian dishes also referred to as tiella include an Abruzzan potato and aubergine casserole and an Apulian stew named tiella di agnello, prepared with lamb, potato and onion. Both of these dishes may also be cooked in an earthenware tiella dish. Tiella di agnello is typically prepared by placing all of the raw ingredients in the tiella dish in layers, which results in the top layer being crispy, while the bottom layer is soft and has liquids that have settled.

== See also ==
- List of potato dishes
- List of rice dishes

== Bibliography ==
- Andrews, Colman (2012). Country Cooking of Italy. Chronicle Books. ISBN 978-1452123929.
- Domenico, Roy Palmer (2002). The Regions of Italy: A Reference Guide to History and Culture. Greenwood Publishing Group. ISBN 0313307334.
- Goldstein, Joyce (2001). Enoteca: Simple, Delicious, Recipes in the Italian Wine Bar Tradition. Chronicle Books. ISBN 0811828255.
- Root, Waverly (1992). The Food of Italy. Knopf Doubleday Publishing Group. ISBN 0679738967.
- Scicolone, Michele (2011). 1,000 Italian Recipes. Houghton Mifflin Harcourt. ISBN 978-0544189119.
- Script Edizioni (2011). Single Courses – iCook Italian. Script Edizioni. ISBN 978-8866143598.
