= Food Cube Rule =

Internet theory for food classification

A model of the eight main classifications of the Food Cube Rule

The Cube Rule of Food Identification, also referred to as the Cube Rule of Food or just the Cube Rule, is an internet theory claiming that most foods can be classified based off of the location of the starch in the dish. The rule conceptualizes foods as a cube and categorizes the foods based off of which faces of the cube are covered by any kind of starch.

== History ==
The Cube Rule originated from a post made on Twitter in 2018 asking if a hot dog should be classified as a sandwich; the general conclusion reached was that a hot dog is a variety of sandwich. Through additional posts and replies, the discussion developed the initial model of the Cube Rule. The debate was reported on by The New York Times and The Washington Post. The initial model was rough and did not include the categories of cake or nachos, which have since been added after further revisions.

The idea received a Webby Award nomination in 2019.

== Real-world usage ==
The model was cited in a judicial opinion by Douglas Nazarian of the Appellate Court of Maryland. The ruling addressed a claim made by a food truck vendor that a Baltimore city ordinance which prohibits the operation of food trucks that directly compete with permanent restaurant establishments within 300 feet of said permanent establishments, is too vague to enforce. The defendant claimed that the ordinance cannot be enforced because the law does not classify different foods into set categories and therefore cannot prove that one food competes with another. Nazarian suggested the implementation of regulations and guidelines such as the Cube Rule as a way to reduce the possibility of confusion and vagueness.

== Examples ==
- A toast is classified as any food with a starch under exactly one side of the food. One exception to this category, however, is a block of just starch, e.g. muffins and uncut bread loaves. Other common examples include nigiri, pizza and a slice pumpkin pie.
- A sandwich is classified as any food in-between two starches; there are no exceptions. Common examples include Victoria sponge cakes and unfolded quesadillas.
- A taco is classified as any food with three connected faces covered by any starch. Common examples include hot dogs, uncut sub sandwiches, and slices of pie.
- A cake is classified as any food with three layers of starch with filling between each layer. Common examples include Big Macs, flapjacks and lasagna.
- A sushi is classified as any food with four connected faces wrapped by any starch. Common examples include falafel wrap, pigs in a blanket and enchiladas.
- A quiche is classified as any food with five connected faces of a starch forming a sort of cup around the filling. Common examples include cheesecakes and soups in a bread bowl.
- A calzone is classified as any food completely surrounded by a starch. Common examples include: corn dogs, Pop Tarts, dumplings and Uncrustables.
- A nacho is classified as any food that is a mix of starch and filling. A nacho does not have a solid shape because of its mixed nature. Common examples include Lucky Charms and salad with croutons.

== Unreliability ==
Food writers have noted that the Food Cube Rule functions primarily as a ironic thought rather than a practical culinary taxonomy. Two foods with identical starch placement can be defined as different things. Commentators pointed out that the framework intentionally produces contradictory classifications—such as categorizing enchiladas as sushi and burritos as calzones—by prioritizing geometric starch placement over culinary arts, food history, ingredients, and preparation methods.
