= Zampina =

Italian variety of cold meat

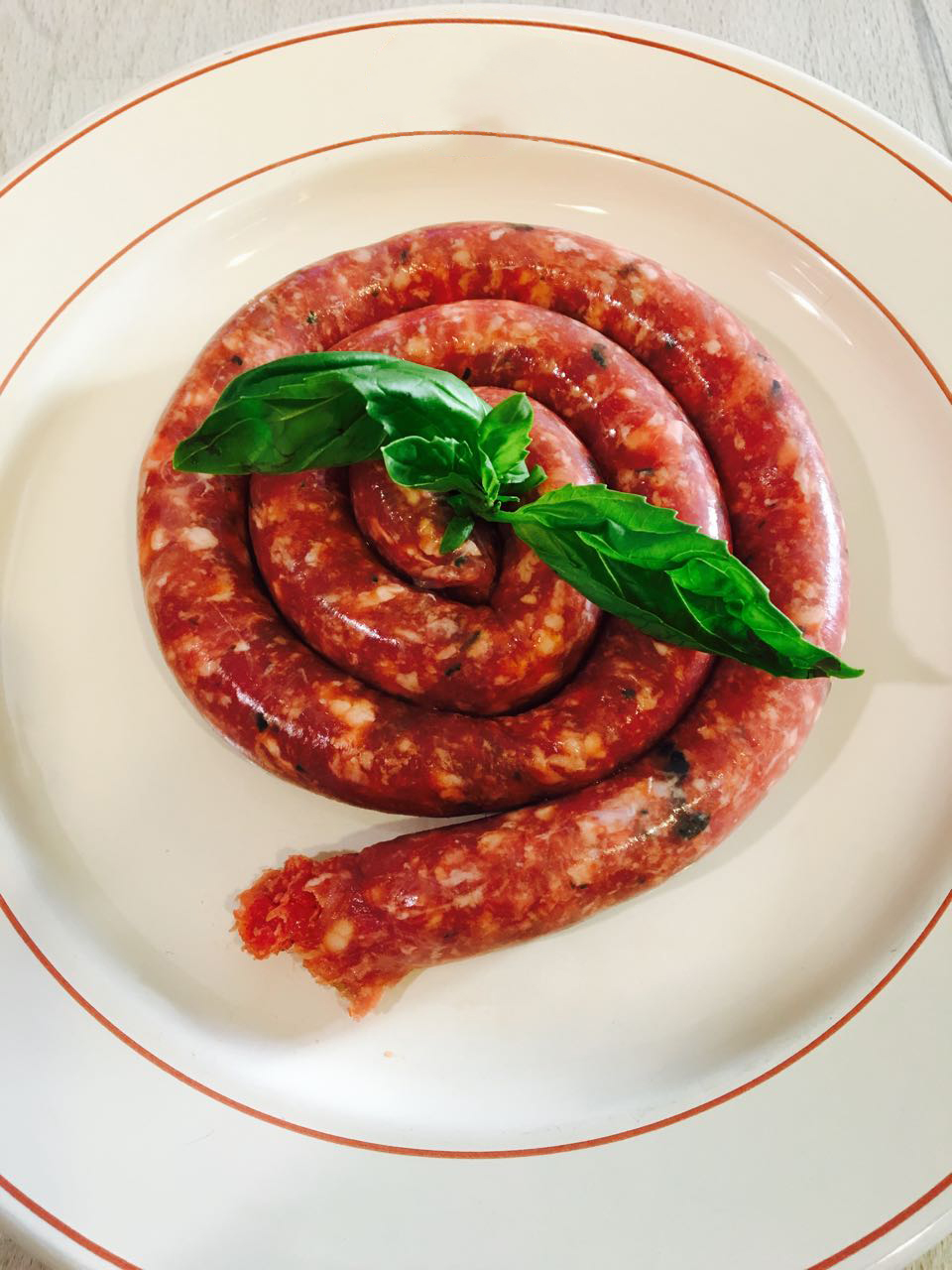
- Alternative names: Zampina di Sammichele
- Course: Secondo (Italian course)
- Place of origin: Italy
- Region or state: Sammichele di Bari, Apulia
- Associated cuisine: Italian (Apulian)

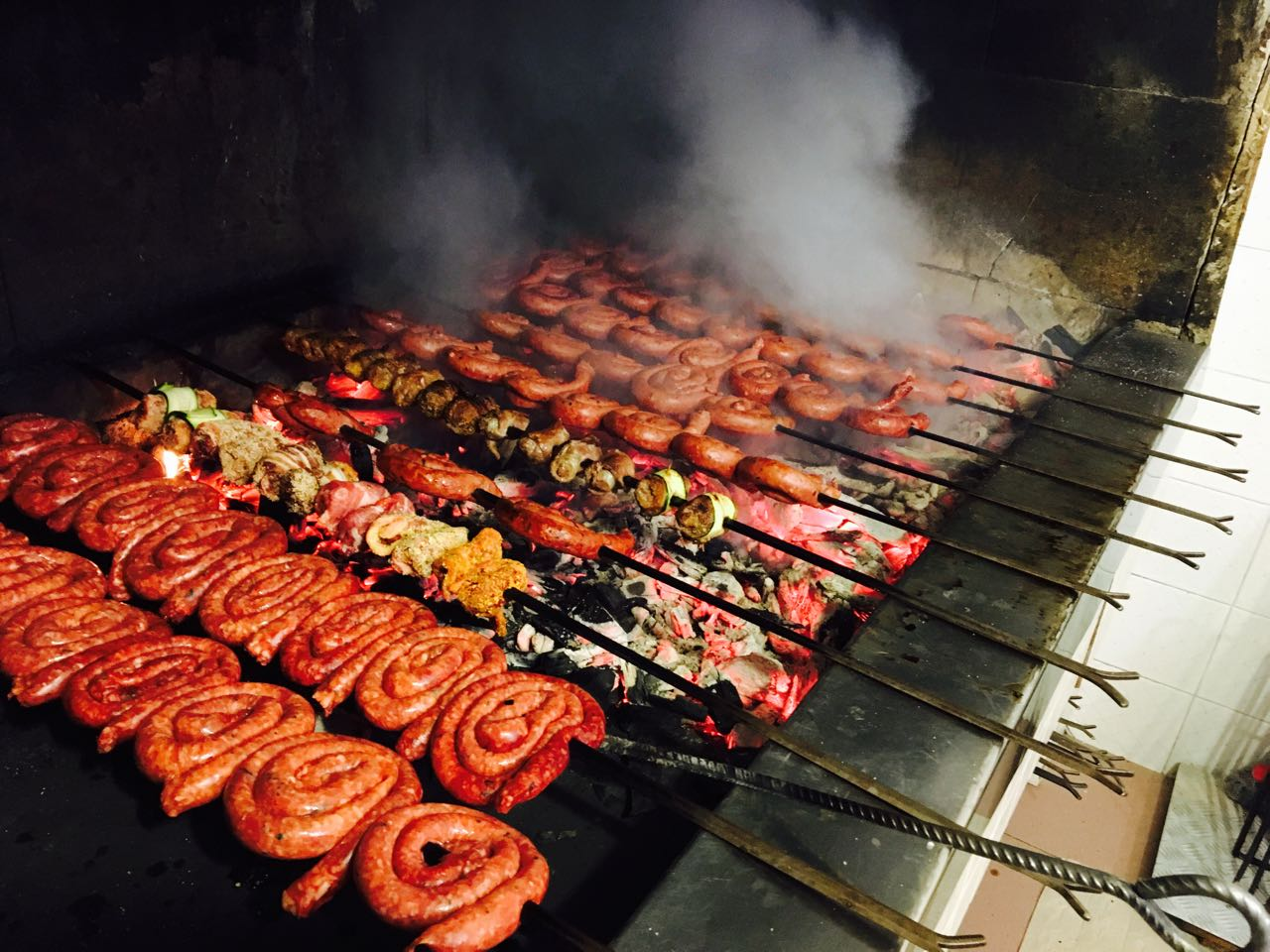
Wheels of zampina

Zampina (Italian: [dzamˈpiːna, tsamˈpiːna]), also known as zampina di Sammichele, is a salume recognised as a prodotto agroalimentare tradizionale (PAT). It also holds the trademark of denominazione comunale d'origine (De.CO).

Zampina originates from the Apulia region of Italy, more specifically from the comune (municipality) of Sammichele di Bari. A festival dedicated to the cold cut has been held since 1967. Zampina has become a commonly consumed cold cut throughout Apulia, and its production has expanded to the towns southeast of Bari.

In 2020, the Promoter Committee for the recognition of the IGP mark of the zampina di Sammichele di Bari was formed, composed of the Municipality of Sammichele di Bari, the Pro Loco Dino Bianco, the Centro Studi di Storia Cultura e Territorio, the G.A.L. Terra dei Trulli e di Barsento and all the butchers of Sammichele di Bari.

== History ==
Its origin dates back to around 1600, where some shepherds used to make it using sheep meat from sheep that had not calved. Sheep guts were used to make the sausage, which were turned over and properly washed. Wet breadcrumbs, cheese, wild thyme and salt were added to the minced meat.

The cold cut has also been dedicated the following poem:

Tra le tue spire / tenere e calde / mi perdo
delicato sapore / di pastura
il frumento dei colli / della Murgia /e l’erba Salvia
dall’antico tratturo / viene dondolando / la gregge
e sogno per tuo amore / placide campagne
mentre volge / dalla brace / una nuvola bianca.
Tra le tue spire / calde e delicate / mi perdo
e per tuo amore / sogno il Frassinito / dolce aspro
ricolmi boccali / di cretaglia a fiori
O Barbarossa / tintinnante soave
è placida sera
Tra le tue spire / tenere e calde / mi sento beato.

— Dino Bianco, Zampina, 1969

== See also ==
- Apulian cuisine
