= Parched grain =

Grain that has been cooked by dry roasting

Parched grain is grain that has been cooked by dry roasting. It is an ancient foodstuff and is thought to be one of the earliest ways in which the hunter gatherers in the Fertile Crescent ate grains. Historically, it was a common food in the Middle East, as attested by the following Bible quotes:

- "On the day after the Passover, on that very day, they ate some of the produce of the land, unleavened cakes, and parched grain."
- "Now Boaz said to her at mealtime, 'Come here, and eat of the bread, and dip your piece of bread in the vinegar.'" So she sat beside the reapers, and he passed parched grain to her; and she ate and was satisfied, and kept some back."

It is known in Hebrew as קָלִי (qālî). The grain has the same length of the normal grain, although somewhat thinner and darker with a green shade. It is served as a casserole hot dish, cooked with morsels of meat or poultry.

== Use as a camp ration ==
A variety of parched grains have been used historically as a camp ration, both for military troops on maneuvers and civilian travelers on extended overland journeys. Because parching both cooked the grains, and removed most of the water content, it was useful as a way to have pre-cooked meals which could be stored or carried for extended periods, and weighed the same or slightly less than the uncooked grains. It also had the advantage that it could be eaten without re-heating it, either dry or by soaking in water, and so would both reduce cooking time in the field and allow troops to travel without any campfires at all if needed.

In particular, parched rice was widely used in South and East Asia for troops well into the 20th century, including by the Imperial Japanese Army during the Sino-Japanese Wars and World War II. It was a primary staple of the People's Liberation Army of China during the Long March as well, being one of the few items they were able to carry a significant supply of while on the move.

Early European accounts of Native Americans record 'parched corn' as one of the many ways the Iroquoian peoples cooked maize. It was prepared by first scorching the corn and then pounding it to a fine meal. It was used in various recipes, but especially as emergency rations for travellers, usually eaten a spoonful at a time with a drink of water. According to Robert Beverley Jr. a local name for this food in Virginia was 'Rockahomonie'.

During the U.S. Civil War parched maize was used both as a grain itself and as a way to carry maize for grinding into cornmeal.

== See also ==
- Tsampa
- Panchamakara
- Grano arso
