= Brik danouni =

Tunisian stuffed pastry

- Alternative names: Brick danouni
- Type: Turnover
- Course: Appetizer
- Place of origin: Tunisia
- Serving temperature: Hot
- Main ingredients: Semolina dough, minced meat, egg, cheese, parsley, onion
- Variations: Fried and baked versions

Brik danouni is a Tunisian stuffed pastry consisting of a semolina-based dough folded around a savoury filling and either fried or baked. It is considered a variation of the Tunisian brik and is commonly served as an appetizer or during the month of Ramadan.

== Description ==
Unlike the more common Tunisian brik, which is traditionally prepared using thin malsouka filo pastry sheets, Brik Danouni is made with a homemade dough prepared from semolina and flour. The pastry is generally shaped into a half-moon turnover before cooking.

== Preparation ==
The dough is typically prepared from semolina, wheat flour, oil or butter, water, and salt. Common fillings include minced meat, onion, parsley, eggs, cheese, olives, and capers, although recipes vary by household and region. The filled pastries are sealed and either deep-fried or baked until golden brown.

== See also ==
- Brik
- Tunisian cuisine
- Empanada
- Samosa
- Fatayer
- U' pastizz 'rtunnar
- Pastizz
