= Sammichele di Bari =

Sammichele di Bari U Casàle (Neapolitan)
- Comune
- Comune di Sammichele di Bari
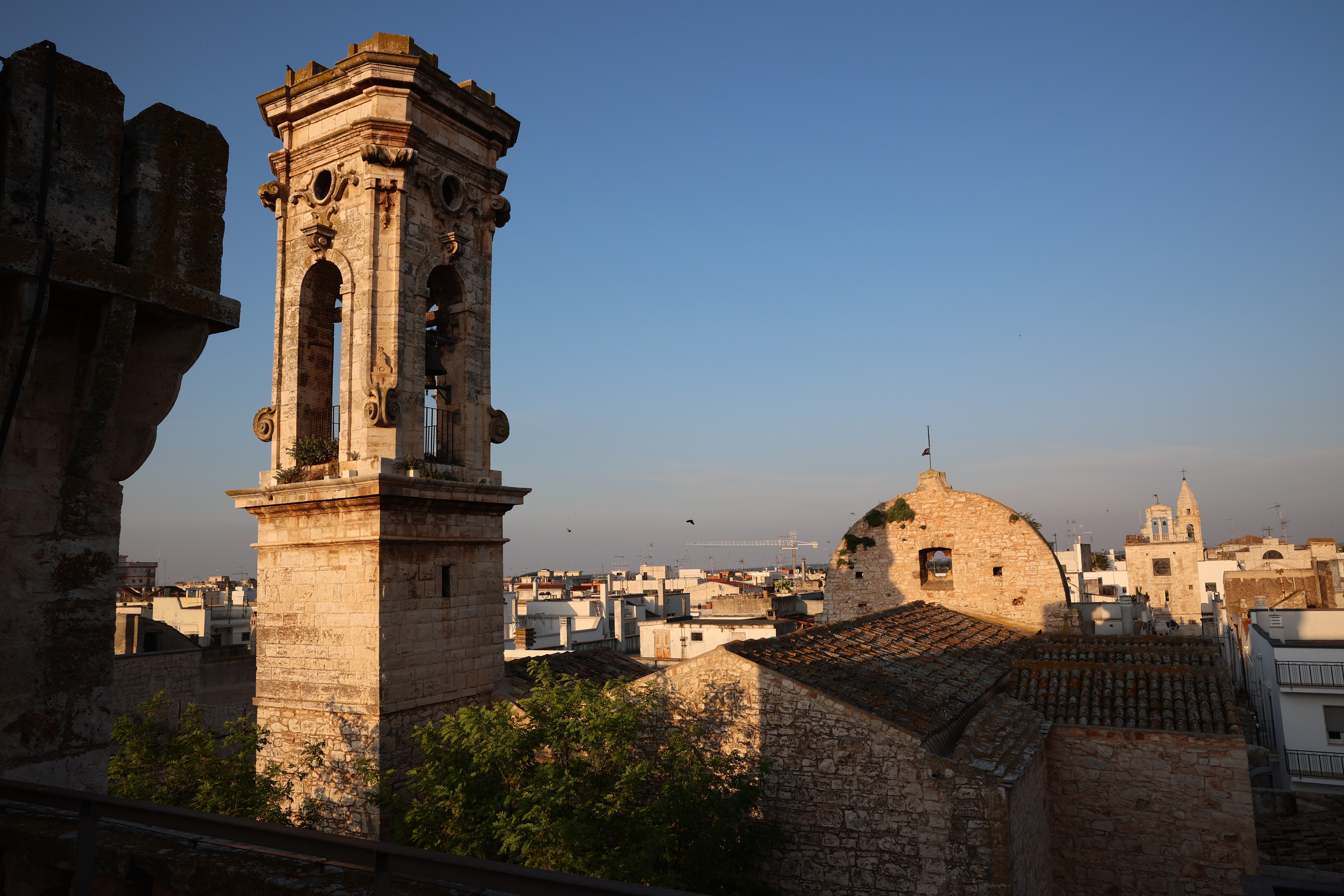
- Skyline of Sammichele as seen from Castello Caracciolo

- Location within Italy Location within Apulia
- Coordinates: 40°53′N 16°57′E
- Country: Italy
- Region: Apulia
- Metropolitan city: Bari (BA)

Government
  - Mayor: Lorenzo Netti

Area
  - Total: 34.23 km^{2} (13.22 sq mi)
- Elevation: 280 m (920 ft)

Population (31 December 2017)
  - Total: 6,454
  - Density: 188.5/km^{2} (488.3/sq mi)
- Demonym(s): Sammichelini, or Casalini
- Time zone: UTC+1 (CET)
  - Summer (DST): UTC+2 (CEST)
- Postal code: 70010
- Dialing code: 080
- Patron saint: Michael the Archangel
- Saint day: Second Saturday and Sunday of May; First Saturday and Sunday in September
- Website: Official website

Sammichele di Bari (Italian pronunciation: [sammiˈkɛːle di ˈbaːri], lit. 'St. Michael of Bari'; Barese: U Casàle, pronounced [u kaˈsæːlə], lit. 'The Rural Houses') is a comune (municipality) in the Metropolitan City of Bari, in the Italian region of Apulia. The town is located on the Murge Plateau and is built primarily on agriculture. It is one of I Borghi più belli d'Italia ("The most beautiful villages of Italy"). Its patron saint is Michael the Archangel.

== Tourism ==
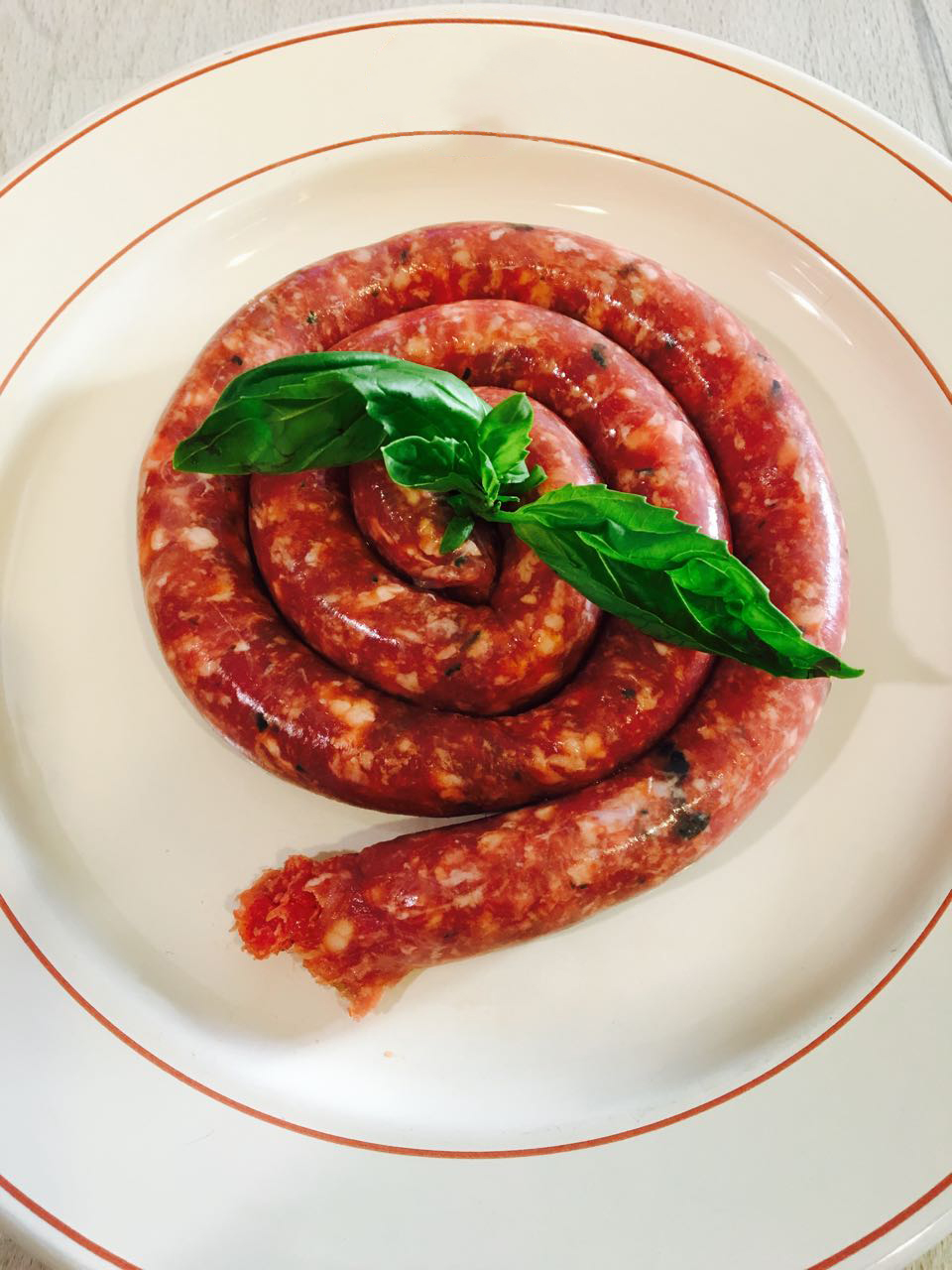
Zampina, most famous dish from Sammichele

Many people visit this town to eat its typical product, zampina. On the last Saturday and Sunday of September, there is a festival called "Sagra della Zampina", to promote the local product.

In the town's castle, there is also a museum, called "Museo della civilltà contadina", in which there are pictures, utensils, and clothes concerning farmer's life in the 19th century.

Next to the castle there also is a small church, called "Chiesa della Maddalena".

== Local products ==
Other local products are:

- F'cazz' al libr' or focaccia al libro, a typical kind of focaccia.
- Ferrovia cherry.
- Primitivo, a kind of wine.
- Zampina, a kind of sausage.

== Transport ==
The town is served by Sammichele railway station, which offers a service from the city of Bari to the city of Putignano. It is also available a bus service that let people get to other cities such as Taranto.
