= Cecamariti =

Type of Italian pasta

- Type: Pasta
- Place of origin: Italy
- Region or state: Lazio
- Main ingredients: Bread dough

Cecamariti is a traditional type of pasta from the Sabina area of Lazio in central Italy. What makes this pasta different is that it's made from bread dough instead of pasta dough. Cecamariti is believed to have been made from leftover bread dough.

The literal translation of the word is “husband blinders” referring to the fact that the dish was impressive enough to dazzle husbands.

== Etymology and History ==
Cecamariti originated in rural areas of Sabina where unlike egg and flour pasta, it was made from bread dough. Making bread everyday was central using scraps of fermented dough left in large wooden proofing boxes called madie.

The name is usually explained through a folk etymology connected with the Italian verb accecare, "to blind", and mariti, "husbands". Local accounts interpret the name as referring to a dish that appeared more elaborate than it was, thereby "fooling" or "blinding" husbands. This explanation is best treated as culinary folklore rather than as a documented historical origin.

== Preparation ==
Dough is made from flour, water, and yeast, then allowed to rise for a soft texture. The pasta maker will take pinch off small pieces from the dough and roll them to make irregular and long shapes. Sometimes they are slightly twisted resembling worms. They are then boiled in water for about 2 to 3 minutes.

== See also ==
- Apulian cuisine
- Italian cuisine
- Lazio cuisine
- List of pasta
