= Pancotto =

Soup

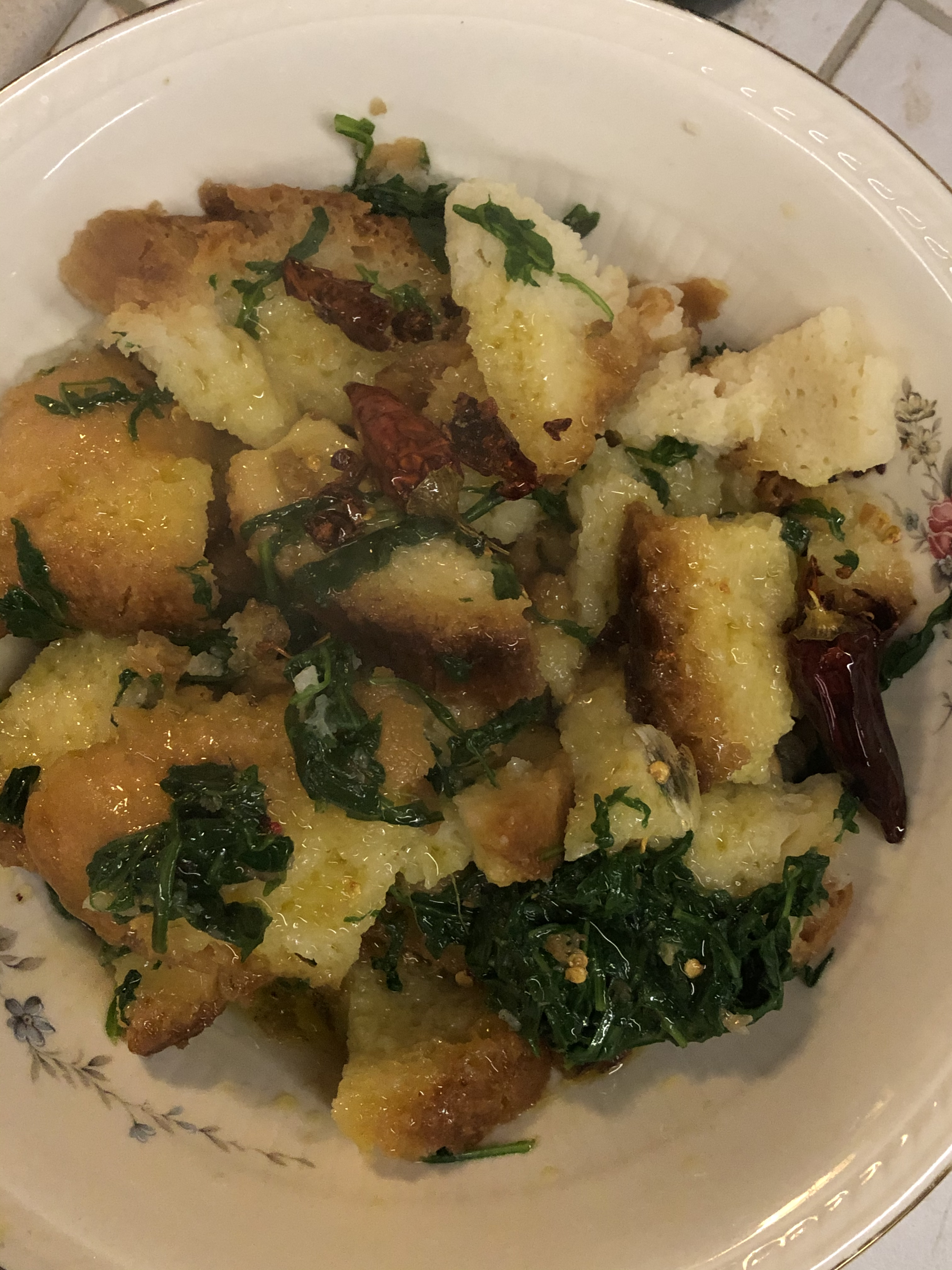
- Type: Soup
- Place of origin: Italy
- Region or state: Tuscany

Pancotto is an Italian soup prepared with pieces of stale bread boiled in broth or water and seasoned.

It is a dish from the cuisine of recovery that recalls peasant culture that would not waste bread, present in all regions of Italy with many variations due to the type of bread, the liquid used, and the cooking process. As a consequence, it has many names, such as Lombard panada, Ligurian pancheuto, and Sardinian pane cottu.

In the past, especially in Lombardy and Tuscany, it was used to promote lactation and it was served to convalescents.

== Pancotto across Italy ==
Tuscan pancotto includes a soffritto of basic herbs and vegetables, such as tomatoes, then wet with liquid, water or broth, and cooked for 10 minutes, to which bread is added.

Pancotto from Latium and Calabria requires that all ingredients, basic vegetables (tomatoes) and herbs (basil, garlic, pecorino cheese, and spices), bread, broth or water are cooked together right from the beginning for about thirty minutes; pancotto from Calabria also includes the addition of chili peppers.

Pancotto from Apulia requires that the basic vegetables (tomatoes, potatoes, zucchini, and turnip tops) are cooked in the liquid to which bread is then added, while the herbs are sautéed separately and added to the rest only at the time of serving.

Pancotto from Torremaggiore (a town the Alto Tavoliere area in the province of Foggia) is prepared according to local tradition; vegetables such as chard, turnips, cabbage, potatoes, and zucchini are boiled with the addition of garlic cloves, after cooking stale bread is added. At the end of cooking everything is drained and served with raw oil. This is a typical recipe from Torremaggiorese.

== See also ==
- List of Italian soups
- Bread soup
- Acquacotta – Italian soup with stale bread as a primary ingredient
