= Deep-fried pizza =

Style of pizza preparation

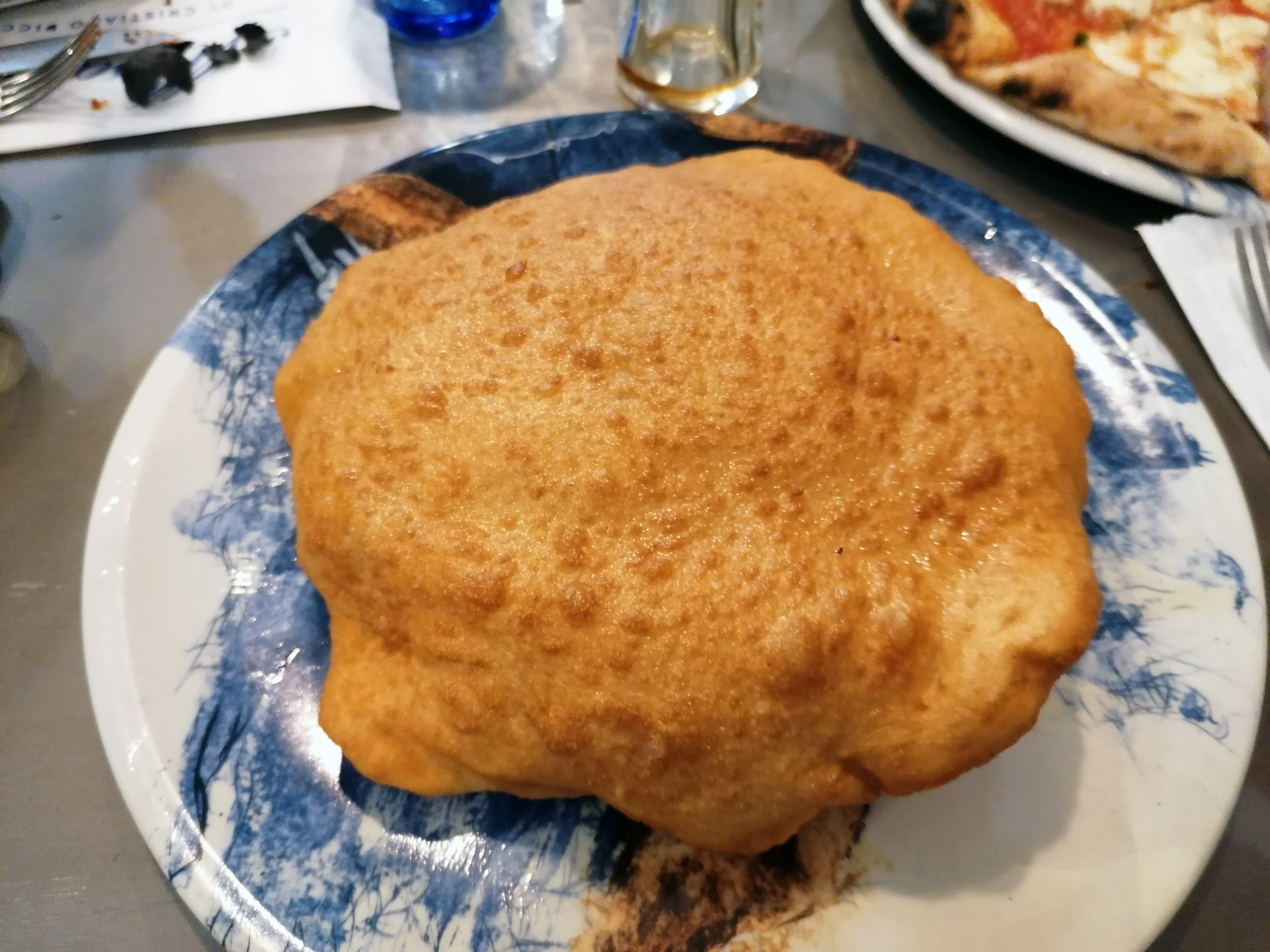
- Pizza fritta in Rome, Italy
- Alternative names: Pizza fritta (in Italian)
- Type: Pizza
- Place of origin: Italy
- Region or state: Naples, Campania

Deep-fried pizza (Italian: pizza fritta) is an Italian dish consisting of a pizza that, instead of being baked in an oven, is deep-fried. This technique is known in both Italy and Scotland, but there are numerous differences between the Italian and Scottish variants, which probably developed independently.

== In Italy ==
Pizza fritta originated in Naples, Italy, and is usually made by frying a disc of pizza dough before applying toppings and serving. Alternatively, the fillings may be enclosed in a pocket of dough like a calzone, which is then fried. Frying allows one to prepare a pizza without a pizza oven, for example from a street food cart, where an oven is impractical.

== In Scotland ==
Deep-fried pizza is common in chip shops in Scotland. This pizza is deep-fried without batter, although another variation known as a "pizza crunch" consists of a battered half-pizza or slice of pizza deep-fried, which can be served with chips as a "pizza crunch supper".

== See also ==
- List of deep-fried foods
