= Rustico (pastry) =

Italian snack made with puff pastry and stuffings

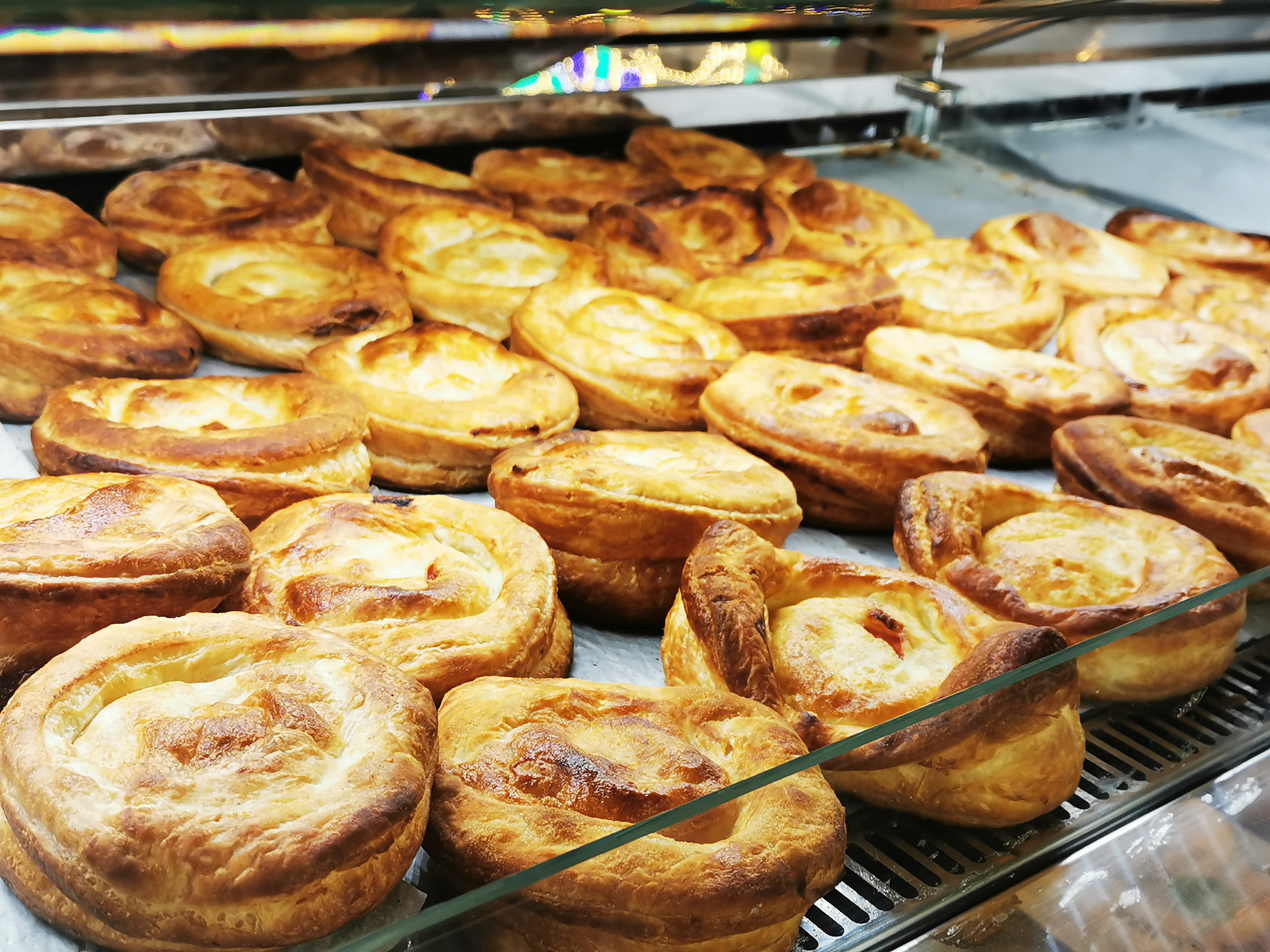
- Type: Fresh pastry, bakery product
- Course: Antipasto or snack
- Place of origin: Italy
- Region or state: Salento, Apulia
- Main ingredients: Puff pastry, any stuffing (usually mozzarella, tomato sauce, bechamel and pepper)
- Variations: There are many ways to make a rustico (usually change size and stuffing), such as those with spinach and ricotta or those with a wurstel.

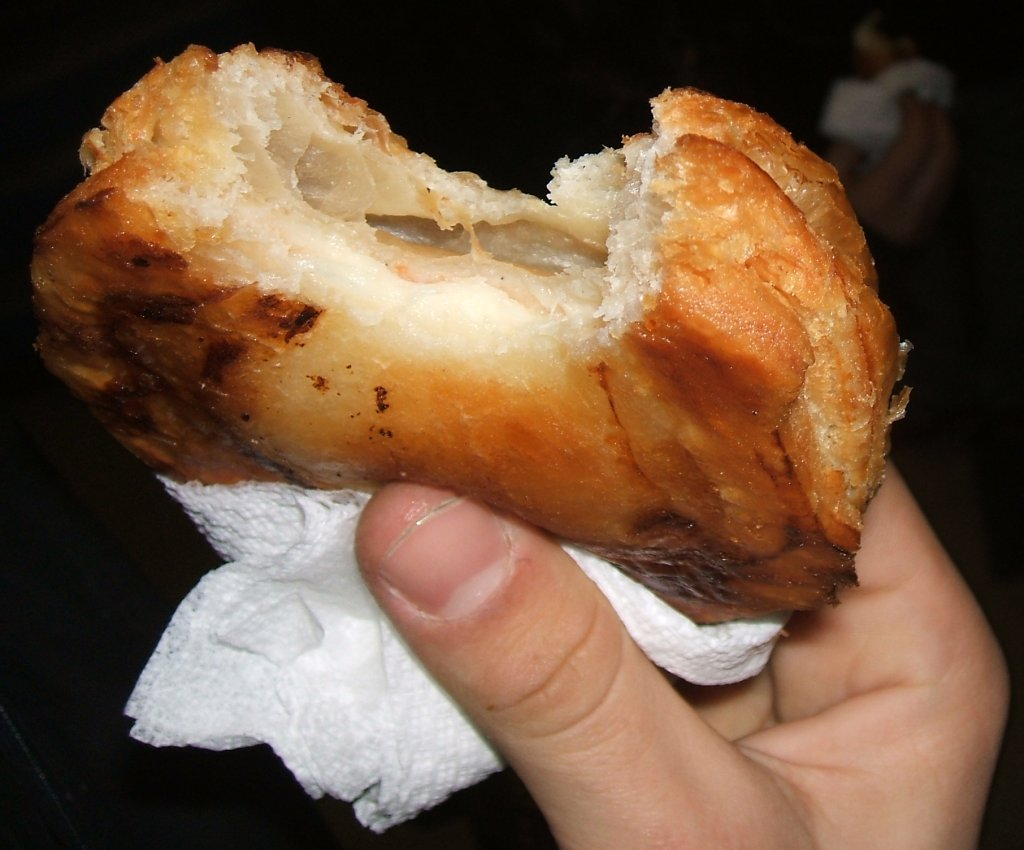
A rustico leccese

Rustico (pl.: rustici) is a Salento snack made with puff pastry and stuffings that vary by style. A common preparation uses puff pastry, tomato, and mozzarella. It is part of the Salentine street food tradition and can be found in every Apulian bar, bakery, and rotisserie.{{Citation needed}}

It is produced with two discs of puff pastry, the lower disk is of about 10 cm (approximately 4 inches) in diameter and the upper one of 12 cm (about 5 inch), to which adds cheese and tomato. Then it is brushed with egg and baked in the oven.

In Salento it is usually eaten as a mid-morning or evening snack, both in summer and winter. The wurstel variant of the pastry is the best known in Salento and throughout northern Italy (perhaps due to the Austrian culinary influence).

== See also ==
- List of Italian desserts and pastries
- List of stuffed dishes
