= U' pastizz 'rtunnar =

Baked pastry from Basilicata, Italy

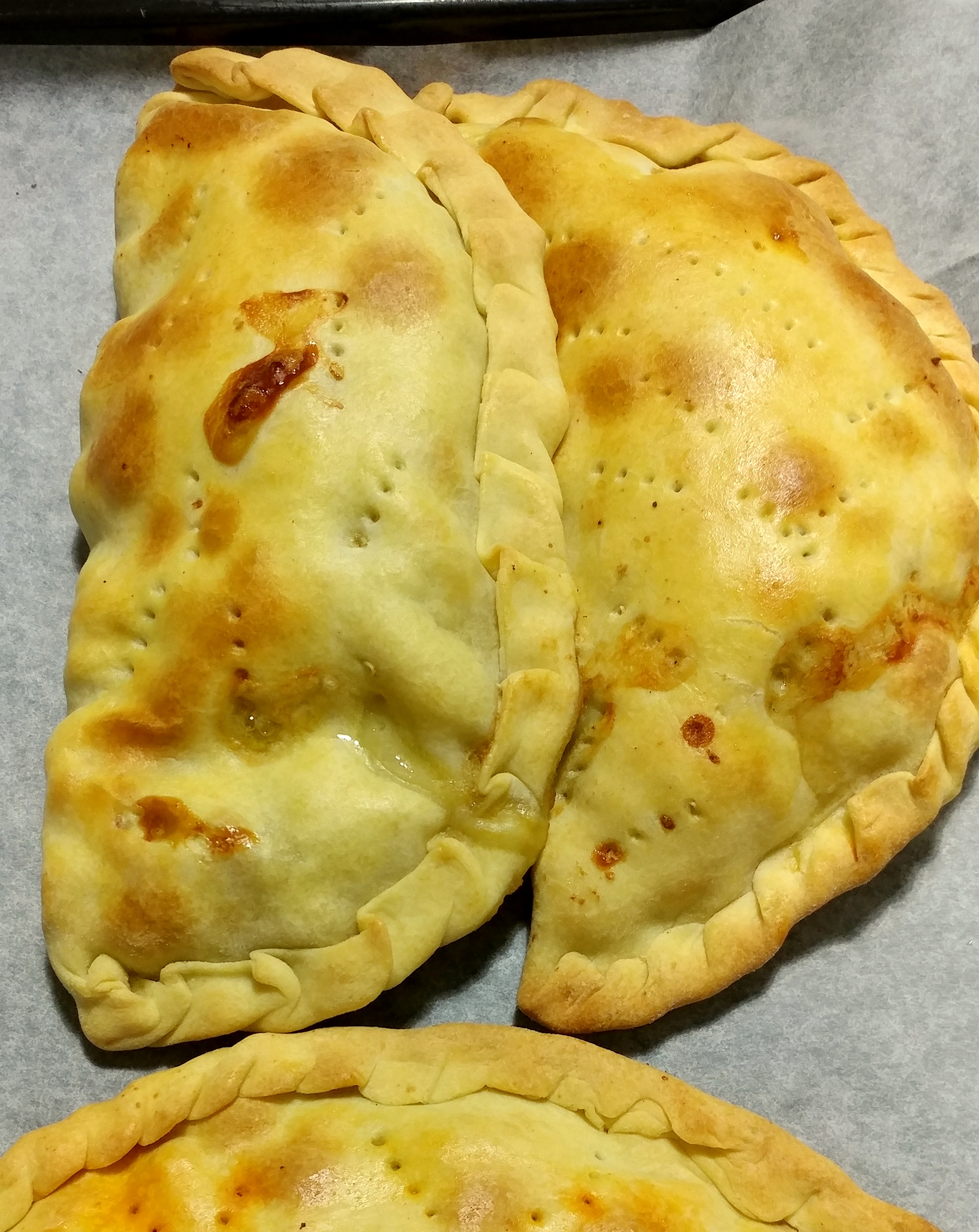
- Type: Turnover
- Place of origin: Italy
- Region or state: Basilicata
- Main ingredients: Pork, eggs, cheese

U' pastizz 'rtunnar, commonly known as pastizz, is a baked turnover with a savoury filling, typical of the Basilicata region of Italy.

== History ==
Pastizz is a type of calzone, originating in the 18th and 19th centuries. By tradition, it was prepared for particular events of the year (pig slaughter, Easter, and the celebration of Saint Mary of Anglona), when the availability of meat was increased. The half-moon shape is linked to a symbolism that refers to the concepts of female fertility and prosperity, and recalls that of a large womb that holds nutritious elements.

== Preparation ==
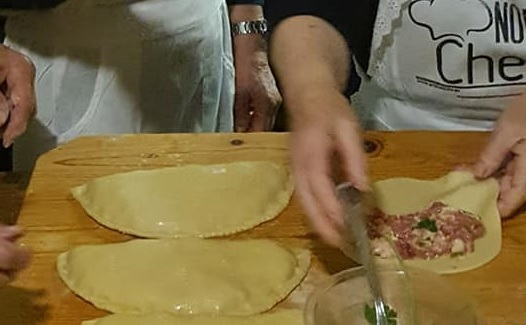
Preparation of the pastizz

Pastizz is about 15–20 cm (6–8 in) long and 10–12 cm (4–5 in) wide, and is traditionally cooked in a wood-burning oven. Fresh seasoned pork (or, more rarely, goat meat) is the main ingredient of the filling, along with egg and cheese, seasoned with salt, parsley, pepper, and olive oil. The dough is made with hard wheat flour, lard, water, extra virgin olive oil, and salt.

== See also ==
- Cuisine of Basilicata
- Calzone
- Empanada
- Brik danouni
