= Pasticciotto =

Type of filled Italian pastry

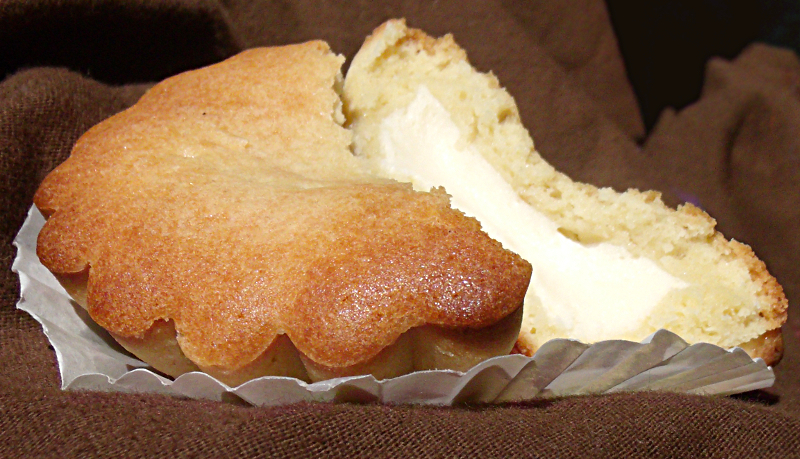
- Ricotta-filled pasticciotto
- Type: Breakfast
- Place of origin: Italy
- Region or state: Apulia
- Created by: Andrea Ascalone
- Serving temperature: Warm
- Variations: Various fillings

Pasticciotto (Italian: [pastitˈtʃɔtto]; pl.: pasticciotti) is a type of filled Italian pastry. Depending on the region, they are traditionally filled with either ricotta cheese or egg custard.

Pasticciotti are approximately 1 inch (2.5 cm) thick. They are typically served as a breakfast item, but may also be eaten throughout the day, and are a traditional pastry in Apulia. According to a number of sources, pasticciotti should be eaten warm.

== Composition ==
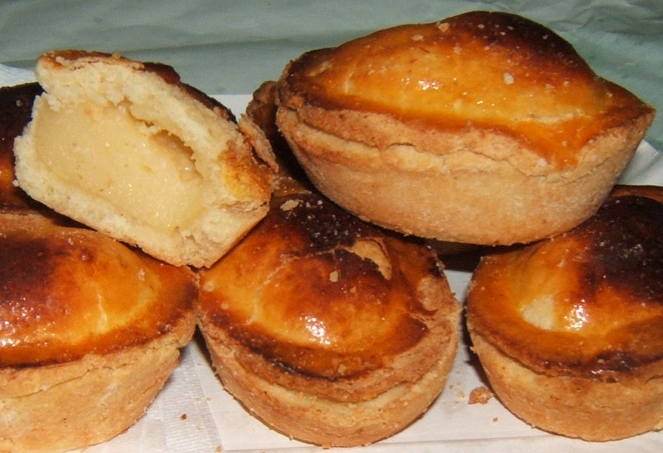
Pasticciotti filled with custard

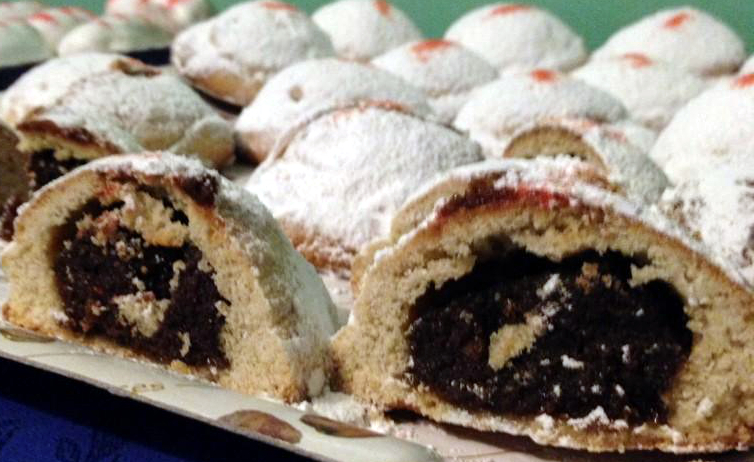
Pasticciotti di carne

=== Crust ===
The short-crust pastry dough used to make pasticciotti was originally shortened with lard, but modern recipes may use butter instead, although this alters the texture of the crust. An egg wash is often applied to the top of each pastry before baking.

=== Fillings ===
Fillings for pasticciotti include the traditional lemon-flavored custard or ricotta, and variant fillings such as almond, chocolate, pistachio or vanilla custard, fruit preserves, gianduja or Nutella chocolate-hazelnut spreads. An unusual variation filled with ground veal and almonds but topped with sugar, pasticciotti di carne, is a local favorite in the Sicilian comune (municipality) of Patti. Pasticciotti di carne are similar to the Moroccan pastilla which also combines a meat filling with a sugar topping. In Italy, custard-filled pasticciotti are the typical variety in Apulia, particularly in the province of Lecce, where the city of Lecce named the pasticciotto its typical cake. The ricotta filling is more commonly seen in Sicily. In Naples, in southwestern Italy between Apulia and Sicily, custard fillings are common but the pasticciotto napoletano also includes cherries. Both custard and ricotta fillings can be found in the United States.

== History ==
The invention of pasticciotti is credited to Andrea Ascalone, a chef in the comune of Galatina, near Lecce, who in 1745 used ingredients left over from full-sized tortas to create a smaller cake. The name pasticciotto allegedly comes from Ascalone himself regarding his creation as a pasticcio, or "mishap". However, recent studies demonstrate that the Ascalone family was not present in Galatina before 1787.

== Availability ==
In southern Apulia, pasticciotti are sold in bakeries, bars, coffee shops and restaurants. They are also commonly available at Italian-American bakeries in the United States, alongside other Italian pastries such as cannoli and sfogliatelle.

== See also ==
Media related to Pasticciotti at Wikimedia Commons

- List of Italian desserts and pastries
