= Capunti =

Type of pasta

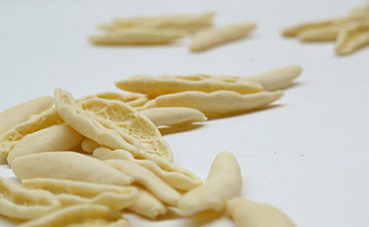
- Type: Pasta
- Place of origin: Italy

Capunti is a type of short convex oval pasta resembling an open empty pea pod.

== See also ==
Media related to Capunti at Wikimedia Commons

- List of pasta
