= Pasquale Natuzzi =

Italian entrepreneur

Pasquale Natuzzi (Matera, 24 March 1940) is an Italian entrepreneur and stylist, founder and chairman of the Natuzzi Group. In his 2008 biography Natuzzi Un divano a Wall Street, Agnese Sinisi considered Natuzzi to be one of the most important entrepreneurs in the history of southern Italy and in the upholstered furniture sector.

== Personal life ==
Born in Matera, he was the second-born of seven children. His father Vitantonio was a small carpenter, his mother Annunziata Tritto owned a small grocery store. After the early years spent in Matera, Natuzzi family moved to Taranto, Puglia. They were the hard years following the Second World War.

== Career ==
=== Early career ===
In that times even children had to help their families: Pasquale was still a child when he used to help his mother in the store and work as shop assistant in his father's carpentry. At 15 he became an apprentice in the workshop of his friend upholsterer. Here, after having seen this craftsman at work, with his dexterity and his gestures, he fell in love with what would have become the work of his life: to manufacture sofas.

In 1959 Natuzzi started on his own and started his first workshop for the production of sofas and armchairs: the Natuzzi company was born. In 1962 he moved to his hometown Matera, taking the advice of his father's friend, who had told him to move to the “subterranean city” because there was a lack of upholsterers. Before long, however, his staff returned to Taranto and Pasquale Natuzzi, not finding substitutes, decided to open a furniture store.

The commercial experience lasted five years, after which Natuzzi returned to his old love and set up a small company that slowly begun to grow. In 1972 he founded the Natuzzi Salotti srl, always based in Matera. A year later, a short circuit set fire to the plant in Matera. Natuzzi was obliged to relocate the production in the factory of Santeramo in Colle (Bari). Overdrawn and without the support of banks, Pasquale Natuzzi started over in a plant still under construction, forced to sleep there because doors and windows lacked. The productions started immediately and the first delivery was carried out already one week after the burning. That factory is now the headquarters of the Natuzzi Group.

By the mid-1970s, Pasquale Natuzzi participated for the first time at a furniture trade fair in Bari, where he took the first contacts with some customers of the Middle East: Saudi Arabia, Israel, Jordan. Already in 1976, the 60% of the company's turnover came from those countries, while the remaining part came from Italy. In 1977 Pasquale Natuzzi participated for the first time at the furniture fair in Cologne, where he exhibited a single leather sofa. Here he got in touch with a major European distribution chain, the Belgian Universe du Cuir, allowing him to export to Northern Europe and specialize in the niche of the leather sofa.

=== United States ===
In the 1980s Pasquale Natuzzi was focused on the conquest of the American market, launching a partnership with Macy's, one of the largest and most prestigious American chain stores. In 1981, for the first time in the American history of furnishing, a leather sofa was sold to the public at a price of $999.

His business idea - "democratizing" the leather sofa - was well described by the American writer Joe Carroll:"Once the leather was perceived as an elite and expensive product, it intimidated consumers. A luxury item for rich people. (...) In the 80's Pasquale Natuzzi, an artisan from a small town of southern Italy, offered the public a leather and affordable sofa. (...) This so much talented Italian has given a great marketing lesson to the Americans: offering what people want, at an affordable price. And the marketers should have been us". Pasquale Natuzzi's intuition to democratize the leather sofa intercepted the consumer's tastes in the world's largest market, the North American one. It was the beginning of an irresistible ascent: in a few years Natuzzi got the world leadership, in 1993 the company was quoted on Wall Street and became a successful model for the Made in Italy in the world.

After that, he became one of the most celebrated and appreciated entrepreneurs in Italy. Claudio Demattè called him to join the board of Sipra, the dealership of Rai running exclusive advertising sales for all media.

In 1995 he received the Premio Leonardo - Italian Quality for innovation and quality of products, combined with a strong international, sales and production inclination from Oscar Luigi Scalfaro.

The 90's growth made him the"King of sofas" and ended with the building of the new headquarters of Natuzzi Americas sales in High Point (NC). The project was committed to the architect Mario Bellini, who realized a building shaped like a ship to symbolize the entrepreneurial story of Pasquale Natuzzi, characterized by the discovery and conquest of America.

=== Sofa District ===
In those years Pasquale Natuzzi’s intuitions represented a valiant business model for many local manufacturing companies that quickly grew in the territory, many of which were founded by the former employees of Natuzzi. In the "sofa triangle" among Santeramo, Matera and Altamura was born a little miracle of the South of Italy: Over the years it would have been officially recognized as the sofa district, that developed and grew following the growth of the Natuzzi Group and of the other production companies in the area. A former employee of Natuzzi, Giovanni Petronella, who founded his company in 1980, said:

"We are all grateful to Pasquale Natuzzi. He is like Christopher Columbus since he discovered a new world".

The growth of the Sofa District was remarkable: the total turnover exceeded 1,400 million Euros, with more than 300 active companies manufacturing finished and semi-finished products, for a total of 11,000 employees.

Over time globalization and markets’ evolution called into question the Natuzzi’s competitive advantages. In an interview Natuzzi declared that the District could have disappeared by 2010 because of unfair competition, the lack of research and the inability to face the new challenges of globalization. Natuzzi decided to focus on the internationalization of production, the defense of Made in Italy, innovation and research to not succumb to the pressure on the price coming from the producers of countries with low labor costs.

== Corporate responsibility ==
In recent years Pasquale Natuzzi has been committed in favor of corporate social responsibility, culture of legality and defense of Made in Italy. His fight against unfair competition and illegal work began with a series of interviews released to Furniture Today and Italian newspapers and TV programs.

In 2012 he held a hearing at the Italian Parliament Budget Committee, where he stated: "The unfair competition is undermining not only our company but the whole territory’s economy that we have developed with such care".

On December 3, 2013, a few days after the fire blazed at the Chinese company “Teresa Moda”, in Prato, where seven Asian men had died, Pasquale Natuzzi wrote an open letter to Giorgio Napolitano, where he denounced that quite similar phenomena were also occurring in the former district of Puglia and Basilicata and he asked the policy to restore the rules of a fair competition.

== Awards ==
- In 1991, the Municipality of Pomarico (MT), awarded him the Prize for Entrepreneurship “Lucania Oro”.
- In 2001, the University of Bari conferred to Pasquale Natuzzi the Honorary Degree in Education, for training initiatives reserved to workers, technicians and managers of the Natuzzi Group over the years.
- In 2008 Pasquale Natuzzi was inducted into the American Furniture Hall of Fame for his outstanding achievements that had contributed to the growth and development of the American furniture industry. He was the first international recipient of the honour.
- In 2010, in Milan, on the occasion of China Awards 2010, the Italy-China Foundation awarded the Natuzzi Group with the Capital Elite prize, as the best evidence of Made in Italy in China.
- In 2011 Pasquale Natuzzi received the Lifetime Achievement Award from the Anti-Defamation League (ADL), for having distinguished himself in his work, improving and enhancing the relations between employees, customers, and among all the people being involved in the business activities.

After 56 years of challenges and intuitions, Pasquale Natuzzi is leading the largest Italian furniture company, with Italian and foreign plants (China, Brazil and Romania), a turnover of 461.4 Million Euros (31 December 2014) and 6,048 employees.

Pasquale Natuzzi lives in Santeramo in Colle (Bari) and is married to Antonisa Perrone, Board Member of Natuzzi SpA. Three of his five children work for the Natuzzi Group: daughters Nunzia and Annamaria and son, Pasquale Junior.
