= Montursi =

- Frazione
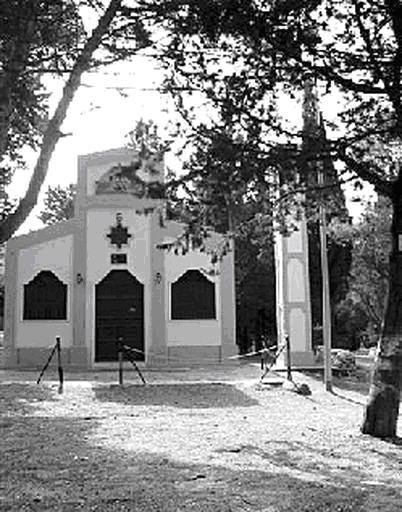
- Chapel of Saint Joseph the Worker

- Location of Montursi in Italy
- Coordinates: 40°44′0″N 16°50′50″E
- Country: Italy
- Region: Apulia
- Province: Bari (BA)
- Comune: Gioia del Colle
- Elevation: 417 m (1,368 ft)

Population (2007)
  - Total: 700
- Time zone: UTC+1 (CET)
  - Summer (DST): UTC+2 (CEST)
- Postal code: 70023
- Dialing code: 080
- Patron saint: Saint Joseph the Worker
- Saint day: 1 May

Montursi (Mendurse in Bari dialect, or Murgia, as the whole region is commonly called) is a frazione or section of the comune of Gioia del Colle, in the Province of Bari, Apulia, southern Italy. It has approximately 700 inhabitants.

The neighbouring settlements are Castellaneta, Laterza, Mottola (all in the Province of Taranto), Matera (in the Province of Matera) and Santeramo in Colle (in Bari).

== Location ==
Montursi is located on the provincial highway between Goia del Colle and Laterza, on the slopes of the Murgia plateau, in an area of steep slopes characterised by the presence of numerous hardwood trees (European oak, Macedonian oak, downy oak) and pine woods; the chapel of Saint Joseph the Worker at Montursi is located in these woods. Since 1959 his festival has been celebrated there on 1 May.

In recent years the pine woods have been improved by the addition of a picnic area, a sports park and an exercise course. Also in the pine woods are buildings that formerly served as the local elementary school and post office, which are today used as places of assembly during the traditional festivities. There is also still an artesian well, used as a water source by farmers.

At an altitude of over 400 metres, Montursi constitutes the highest part of the comune of Gioia del Colle. The peculiarity of the location, between Alta Murgia National Park and Ravines Park, is that it represents a synthesis characteristic of the interior acidic Murgia, in which, in contrast to the typical pseudo-steppe which distinguishes the hillsides in the acidic land, which are called Toppe, from the karst topography (hollows, ravines and caves) and from wooded areas, the landscape has been affected by human activity on the part of farmers, who have made the acidic ground fertile by tilling and made the landscape hospitable by constructing the numerous farms, rural dwellings, and agricultural enterprises that have come to characterise the regional economy: Toppe di Montursi, Grottacaprara, Lamie Nuove, Murgia Faccia Rossa, Murgia FraGennaro, Purgatorio and Masseria del Porto. Emblematic of this is the pig-enclosure in the regional style (called a jazzo) in the pine wood at Grottacaprara, which is within easy reach of the evocative ravine called Gravina Del Porto.

== Flora and fauna ==
Protected species include the lesser kestrel (Falco naumanni) and the orchid. There are numerous foxes, and a rich and numerous variety of bird species.

== History ==
The area has been inhabited since the Paleolithic, as is shown by the discovery of about thirty dolmen burials which can be dated to the 13th to the 12th centuries BCE, of the types: gallery dolmen tomb, dolmen tumulus with rectangular cell, and pseudo-dolmen cell. At Murgia San Francesco is La Castelluccia, a settlement of the Peucetii dating back to the 6th century BCE; it flourished in the Hellenistic period and declined in the Roman period.

The frazione was formally established by the Commune of Gioia del Colle in 1958, but in reality wealthy landowners had established farms there since the 18th century, and following the unification of Italy and the subsequent agrarian reform, this part of the countryside of Gioia had become densely populated, as is shown by the rural schools and the now disused Montursi post office, as well as the great farms, the so-called casini (country lodges), the dry stone walls, the conical-roofed trulli and casedde, and the stone church of Santa Maria at Masseria del Porto.

The wooded areas near Montursi were a hiding place and area of activity for Sergeant Romano, one of the participants in the brigandage in Southern Italy.

On 12 October 1957, the Prefect Commissioner of Gioia del Colle decided to make a free grant of land owned by the comune for the construction of a parish church, parish house and parish infrastructure in Montursi. At that time approximately 3,000 people resided there and some parts of the area had become somewhat reforested. In February 1959, Prefect Commissioner Emanuele Loperfido assigned a contribution of ₤ 300,000 for the erection of the church of Saint Joseph the Worker. On 22 June 1959, the final plans for the construction of the civil government building in Murgia were approved.

In the Montursi pine woods a monument has been placed in honour of the fallen citizens of Montursi who gave their lives in the First World War.

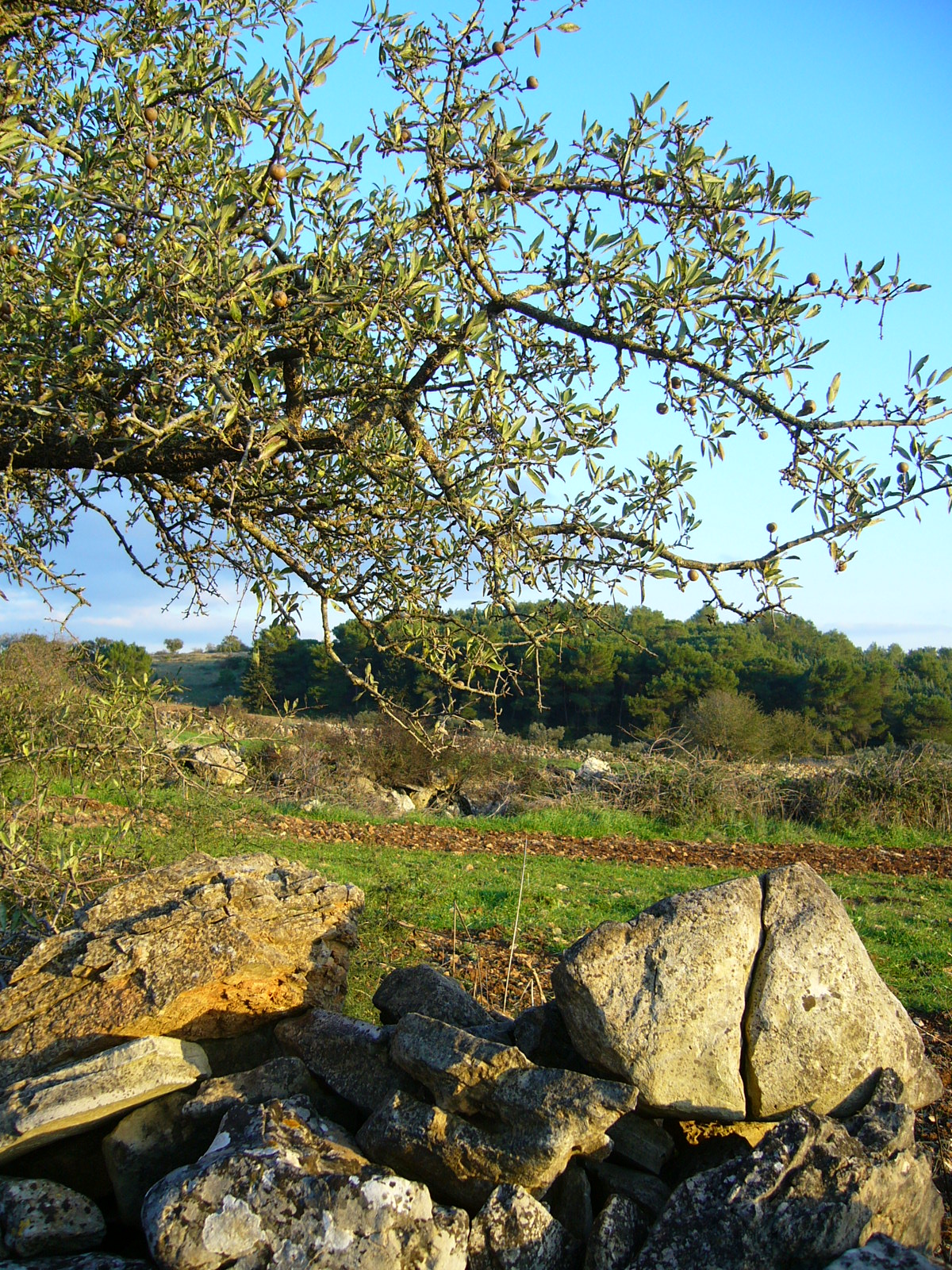
200 pxes

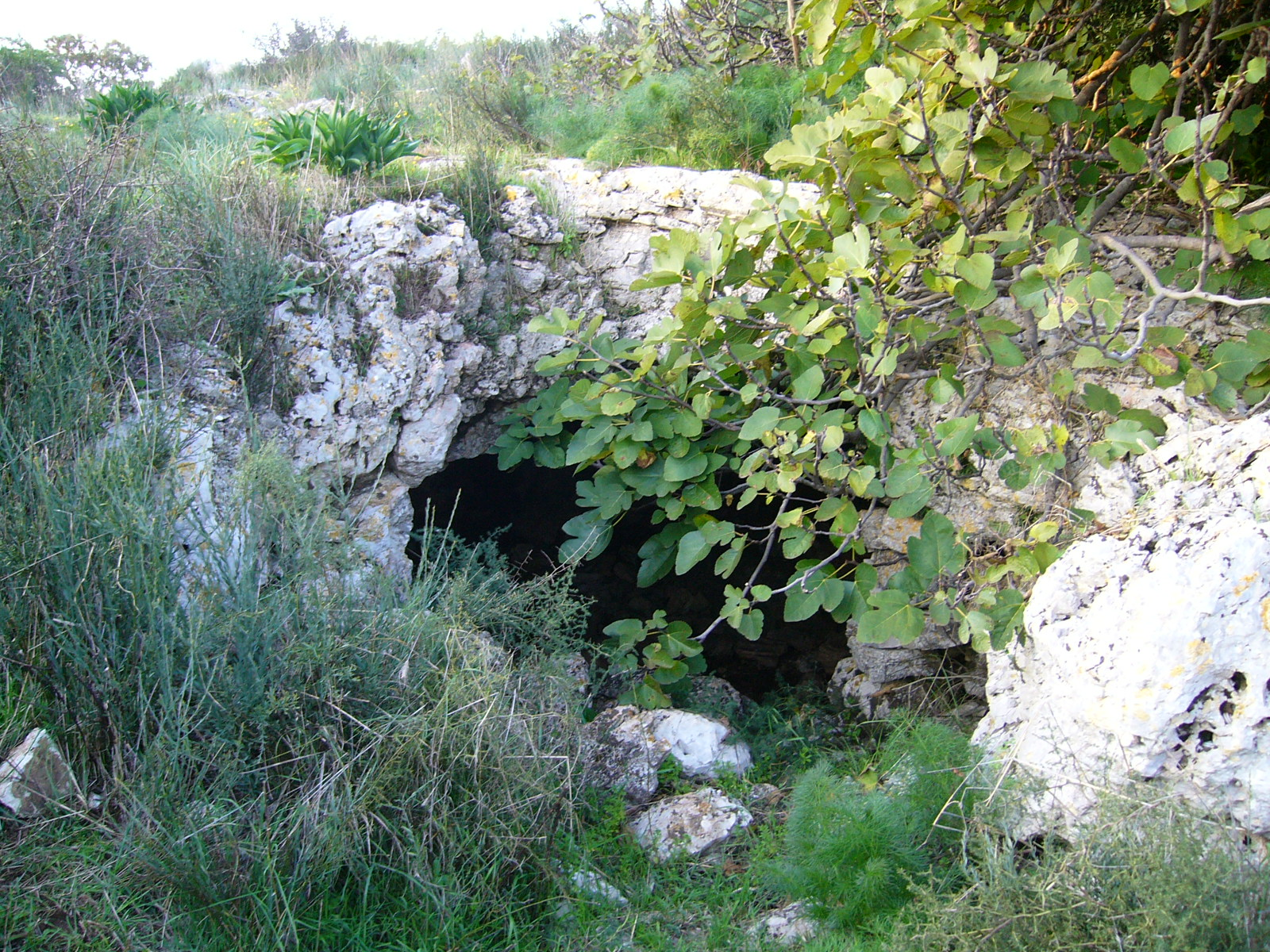
A cave on Montursi toppa

== Economy ==
The economy is still primarily based on cattle rearing and on dairy farming, supporting the cheese industry of Gioia del Colle in the production of its famous mozzarella. Although cultivation is predominantly for forage, cultivation of olives, almonds and cherries is typical. There is also tourism, especially in the summer season; there are numerous second homes, some bed and breakfasts and pizzerias.

== Festivals and feast days ==
- 1 May — Feast of St. Joseph the Worker: attended every year by thousands of people who enjoy the fresh air in the pine woods, the celebration in honour of the saint has come to inaugurate the summer season. Although its roots go back to time immemorial, the event was instituted in 1959, coinciding with the construction of the church, to counterbalance the secular celebration of May Day on the same day in the Piazza XX Settembre in Gioia del Colle.
- August — Feast of the Pupo Fritto: a festival celebrating the typical Apulian fried pancake, sponsored in recent years by the local council and which has become an event not to be missed.
