= Santeramo railway station =

Railway station in Italy

Santeramo

General information
- Location: Santeramo in Colle, Province of Bari, Apulia; Italy
- Coordinates: 40°48′09″N 16°45′50″E
- Owner: Rete Ferroviaria Italiana
- Line: Rocchetta Sant'Antonio-Gioia del Colle railway line
- Platforms: 2

History
- Closed: 11 December 2016
Location
- Location within Apulia Location within Italy

Santeramo railway station was a railway station in Santeramo in Colle, Italy. The station was located on the Rocchetta Sant'Antonio-Gioia del Colle railway line. The station was closed with the 2016 timetable change.
