= Pampanuto =

Variety of grape

Pampanuto (also known as Pampanino) is a white Italian wine grape variety that is grown in the Apulia region of southern Italy. Here the grape is used primarily a blending variety, often paired with higher acid grape varieties that need to have their acidity toned down.

== DOC wines ==
Pampanuto is a permitted variety in the Denominazione di origine controllata wines of the Gioia del Colle DOC located in the province of Bari. Here it is a minor component in the white wines that are primarily composed of 50-70% Trebbiano Toscano with Pampanuto and other local white grape varieties permitted to fill in the remainder of the blend. Pampanuto grapes destined for DOC wine production must be harvested to a yield no greater than 13 tonnes/hectare with the finished wine needing to attaining a minimum alcohol level of 10.5%.

== Synonyms ==
Over the years Pampanuto has been known under a variety of synonyms including La Pampanuta, Pampanino, Pampanuta, Pampanuto di Terlizzi and Rizzulo.
