= Gioia del Colle =

- Comune
- Comune di Gioia del Colle
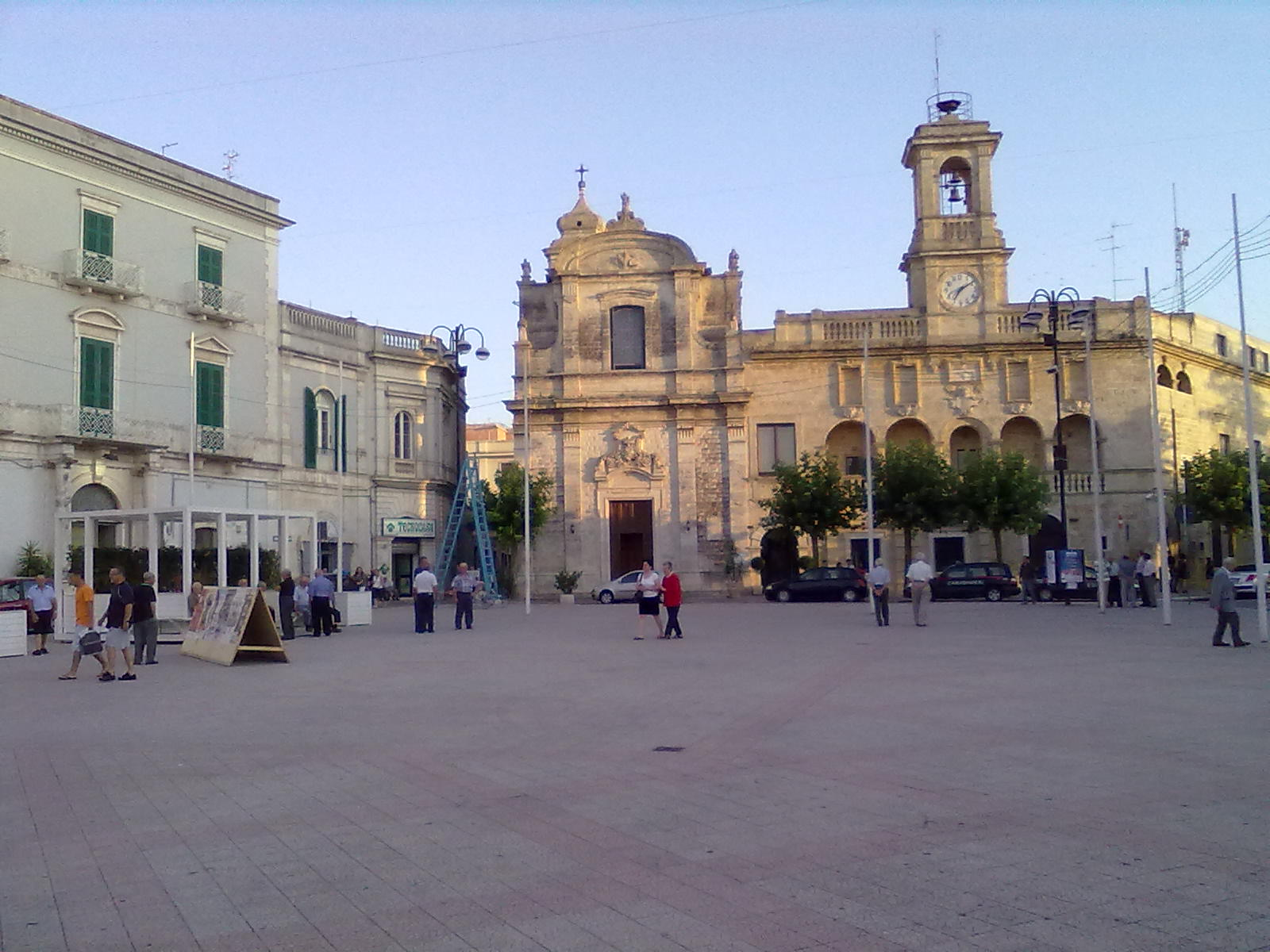

- Location within Italy Location within Apulia
- Coordinates: 40°48′N 16°56′E
- Country: Italy
- Region: Apulia
- Metropolitan city: Bari (BA)
- Frazioni: Colonia Hanseniana, Corvello, La Torre, Casino Eramo e Marzagaglia, Monte Sannace, Montursi, Murgia, Santa Candida, Terzi, Villaggio Azzurro

Government
  - Mayor: Giovanni Mastrangelo (right wing)

Area
  - Total: 206.48 km^{2} (79.72 sq mi)
- Elevation: 360 m (1,180 ft)

Population (1 January 2015)
  - Total: 27,923
  - Density: 135.23/km^{2} (350.25/sq mi)
- Demonym: Gioiesi
- Time zone: UTC+1 (CET)
  - Summer (DST): UTC+2 (CEST)
- Postal code: 70023
- Dialing code: 080
- ISTAT code: 072021
- Patron saint: Saint Philip Neri
- Saint day: 26 May
- Website: Official website

Gioia del Colle (pronounced [ˈdʒɔːja del ˈkɔlle]; Barese: Sciò) is a town and comune of the Metropolitan City of Bari, Apulia, Italy. The town is located on the Murge plateau at 360 metres (1,180 ft) above sea level, between the Adriatic and Ionian seas.

== Physical geography ==
=== Territory ===
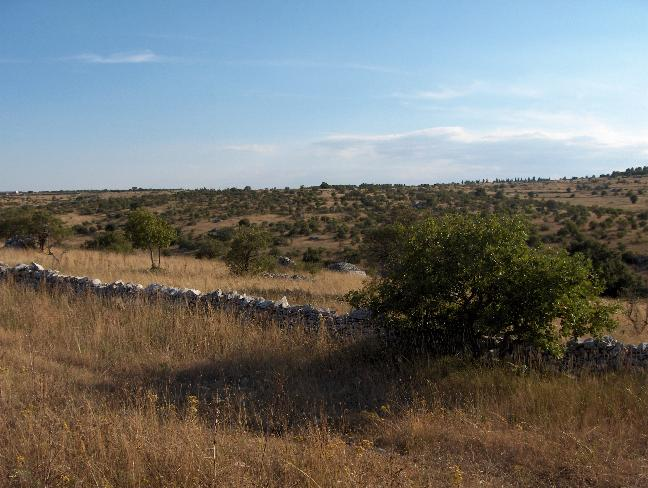
Typical Murgia aspect

Gioia del Colle is on the top of a hill at 360 m a.s.l. It is located in the southern part of the Murge, in the "Sella di Gioia del Colle". It is between the North-West Murge and the South-West Murge and the Adriatic Sea and the Ionian Sea. The municipal area has an area of 206.48 km^{2} and it reaches a maximum altitude of 435 m a.s.l. and a minimum of 296 m a.s.l. Its area borders to the North-West with Acquaviva delle Fonti, to the North with Sammichele di Bari, to the North-East with Turi, to the East with Putignano and Noci, to the South-East with Mottola, to the South with Castellaneta, to the South-West with Laterza and to the West with Santeramo in Colle.

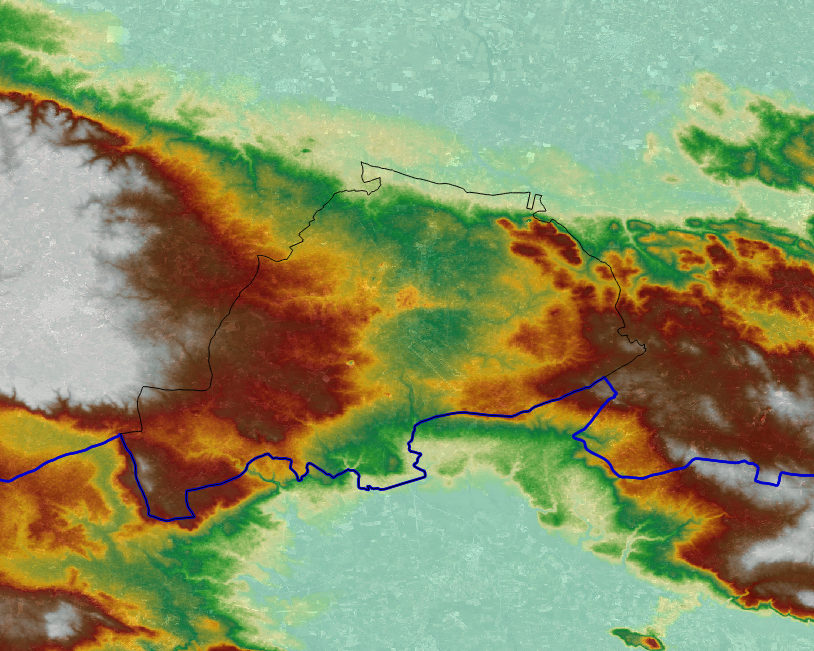
Gioia del Colle's orography

The landscape is characterized by large wooded areas, in which the Macedonian oaks dominate, more than the downy oak. In particular the Bosco Romanazzi and Serra Capece constitute the most conspicuous part of the wooded area of Gioia del Colle and they extend from Mount Sannace archaeological area to the provincial road that leads to Noci.

The western part of the area is part of the North-West Murge, with isoipse that exceed 400 m a.s.l. towards Santeramo and Laterza, while the Eastern one is part of the South-East Murge, with isoipse over 400 m a.s.l. towards Noci. In the middle, on the contrary, there is a depression (saddle) with an average altitude of 340 m a.s.l., interrupted only by the 360-meter hill on which the city lies.

=== Climate ===
Gioia del Colle's climate is mediterranean (Köppen Csa), but it has peaks of continentality due to the altitude and the distance from the sea. Temperature varies between −2 e +12 °C in winter, while it varies between +18 e +35 °C with a high percentage of humidity in summer. Annual rainfall is around 600 mm. It often snows, about once a year, especially if there is cold air of Balkan origin.

Climate data for Gioia del Colle (Gioia del Colle Air Base), 1991–2020
| Month | Jan | Feb | Mar | Apr | May | Jun | Jul | Aug | Sep | Oct | Nov | Dec | Year |
|---|---|---|---|---|---|---|---|---|---|---|---|---|---|
| Mean daily maximum °C (°F) | 10.3 (50.5) | 10.8 (51.4) | 13.8 (56.8) | 17.4 (63.3) | 22.8 (73.0) | 28.0 (82.4) | 30.8 (87.4) | 31.1 (88.0) | 25.6 (78.1) | 20.5 (68.9) | 15.4 (59.7) | 11.3 (52.3) | 19.8 (67.6) |
| Daily mean °C (°F) | 6.3 (43.3) | 6.5 (43.7) | 8.9 (48.0) | 12.0 (53.6) | 16.8 (62.2) | 21.8 (71.2) | 24.4 (75.9) | 24.5 (76.1) | 19.8 (67.6) | 15.6 (60.1) | 11.4 (52.5) | 7.6 (45.7) | 14.6 (58.3) |
| Mean daily minimum °C (°F) | 2.5 (36.5) | 2.5 (36.5) | 4.4 (39.9) | 7.0 (44.6) | 11.0 (51.8) | 15.5 (59.9) | 17.9 (64.2) | 18.3 (64.9) | 14.7 (58.5) | 11.2 (52.2) | 7.6 (45.7) | 3.9 (39.0) | 9.7 (49.5) |
| Average precipitation mm (inches) | 60.2 (2.37) | 52.4 (2.06) | 64.7 (2.55) | 51.3 (2.02) | 43.0 (1.69) | 36.5 (1.44) | 24.1 (0.95) | 24.5 (0.96) | 69.4 (2.73) | 65.6 (2.58) | 78.5 (3.09) | 69.5 (2.74) | 639.8 (25.19) |
| Average precipitation days (≥ 1 mm) | 7.5 | 7.3 | 6.9 | 6.8 | 5.5 | 4.1 | 2.8 | 2.6 | 5.9 | 7.0 | 7.7 | 8.3 | 72.3 |
| Average relative humidity (%) | 79.6 | 75.9 | 74.2 | 73.4 | 70.4 | 65.5 | 63.0 | 64.5 | 70.7 | 77.1 | 80.8 | 80.9 | 73.0 |
| Average dew point °C (°F) | 3.5 (38.3) | 2.9 (37.2) | 4.9 (40.8) | 7.5 (45.5) | 10.9 (51.6) | 13.9 (57.0) | 15.3 (59.5) | 16.2 (61.2) | 14.5 (58.1) | 12.2 (54.0) | 8.8 (47.8) | 5.0 (41.0) | 9.6 (49.3) |
Source: NOAA

== History ==
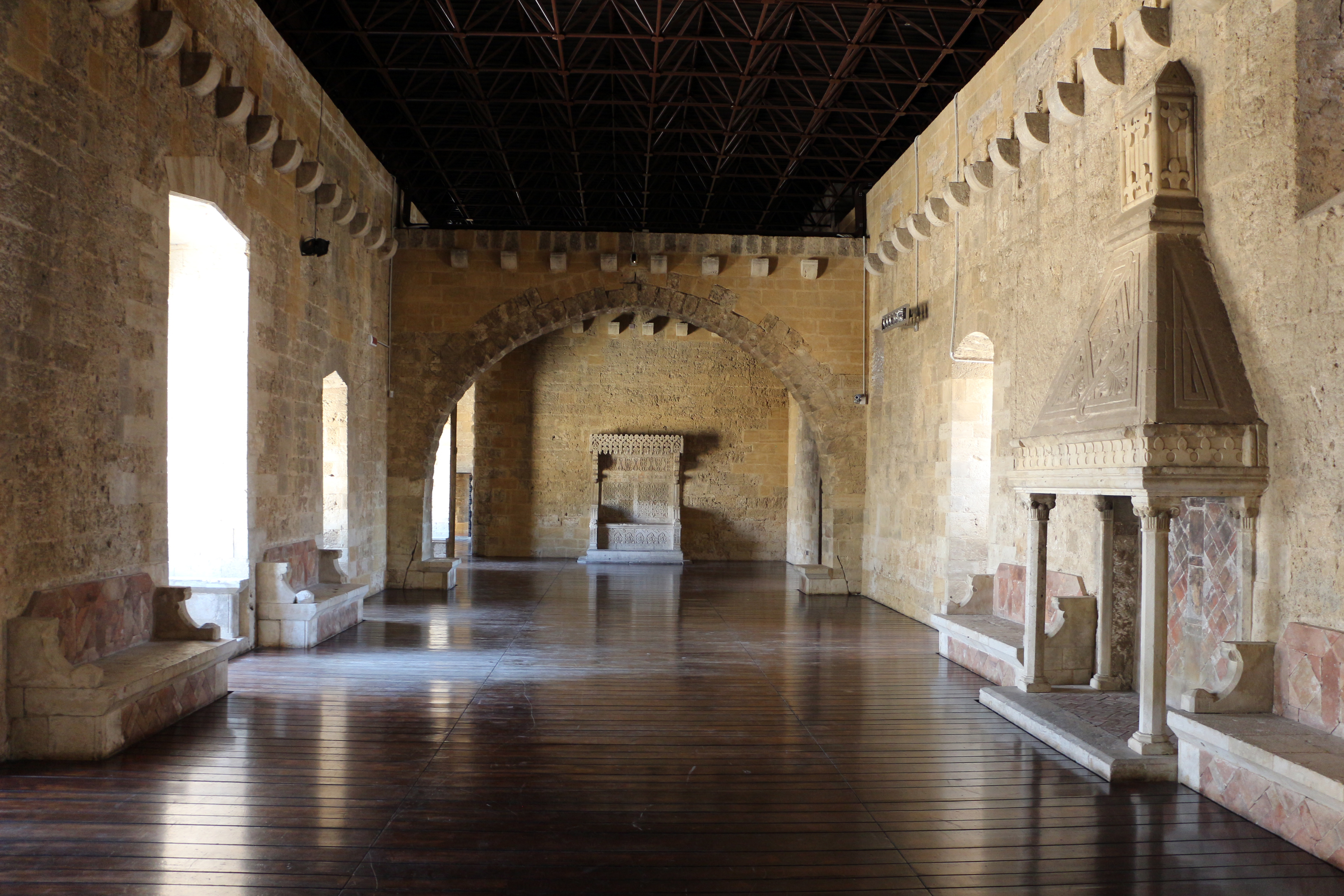
Throne room in the Norman-Hohenstaufen Castle

The current town of Gioia del Colle was born around Castello Normanno-Svevo, a castle of Byzantine origins.

Its name derives from Joha, a reduction of the surname Joannakis. It was a Byzantine family present in these places in the Middle Ages, but there are many opinions and even legends on the origin of the toponym. One of the most famous is that according to a noble woman traveling in the lost area of jewels including a beautiful and precious necklace. The name "Gioia del Colle" was given to the place where the necklace was found. The complex and original history of the city of Gioia del Colle is also illustrated in its particular heraldic coat of arms: a goblet-shaped cup full of jewels and bordered by agricultural motifs. Unlike the coats of arms of the neighboring countries, that of Gioia del Colle, dating back to 1934, is not linked to any symbol depicting families, marquisates or duchies. It tells the presence of a heterogeneous civilization ranging from poverty to wealth, from crafts to large estates . It is inspired by a sculpture made in 1480 by Joannes de Rocca, on a stone walled in the University of Gioia's seat. It depicts three coats of arms: that of Gioia with the inscription Universitas Joe, the Aragonese one with the royal crown and that of the Acquaviva counts of Conversano.

The inhabited area was rebuilt by the Norman Richard of Hauteville, only to be destroyed by William I of Sicily. It was re-founded in 1230 by Frederick II of Swabia on his return from the Crusade. It seems that the castle was a residence where he stopped during his hunting trips. It was then completed by the Angevins who opened windows on the curtain.

Between 1600 and 1800 the successive owners (Acquaviva d'Aragona, the De Mari and Donna Maria Emanuela Caracciolo) removed the appearance of a fortified residence from the complex.

The "new" city, however, would have originated from a much older settlement: Monte Sannace, about 5 km away from today's town. Archaeological excavations, even today, bring to light the remains of a village of Peucetians dating back to the 7th century BC. Gioia was born during the Byzantine dominion and then passed under the Norman dominion, it was given to Count Richard of Hauteville. Frederick II was responsible for the reconstruction of the castle. It was principality of Taranto and fief of the De Mari princes of Acquaviva delle Fonti until the abolition of feudalism.

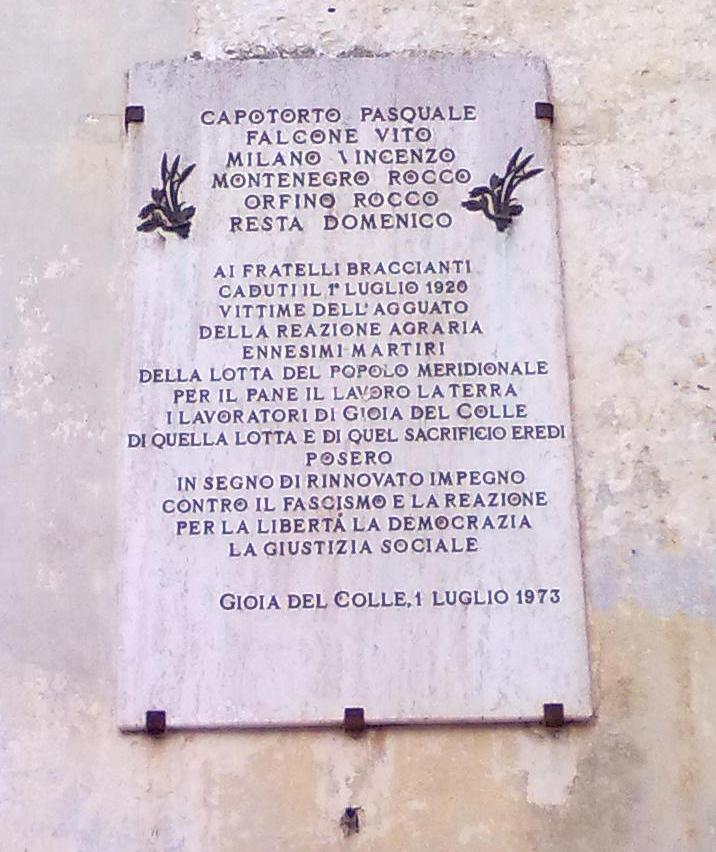
Plaque commemorating the events of Marzagaglia in 1920.

=== Marzagaglia's massacre ===
In 1920 the Marzagaglia massacre took place, in the difficult social and political climate of the first post-war period. On 1 July 6 workers were killed and following day in retaliation three landowners.

== Monuments and interesting places ==
=== Norman-Hohenstaufen castle ===
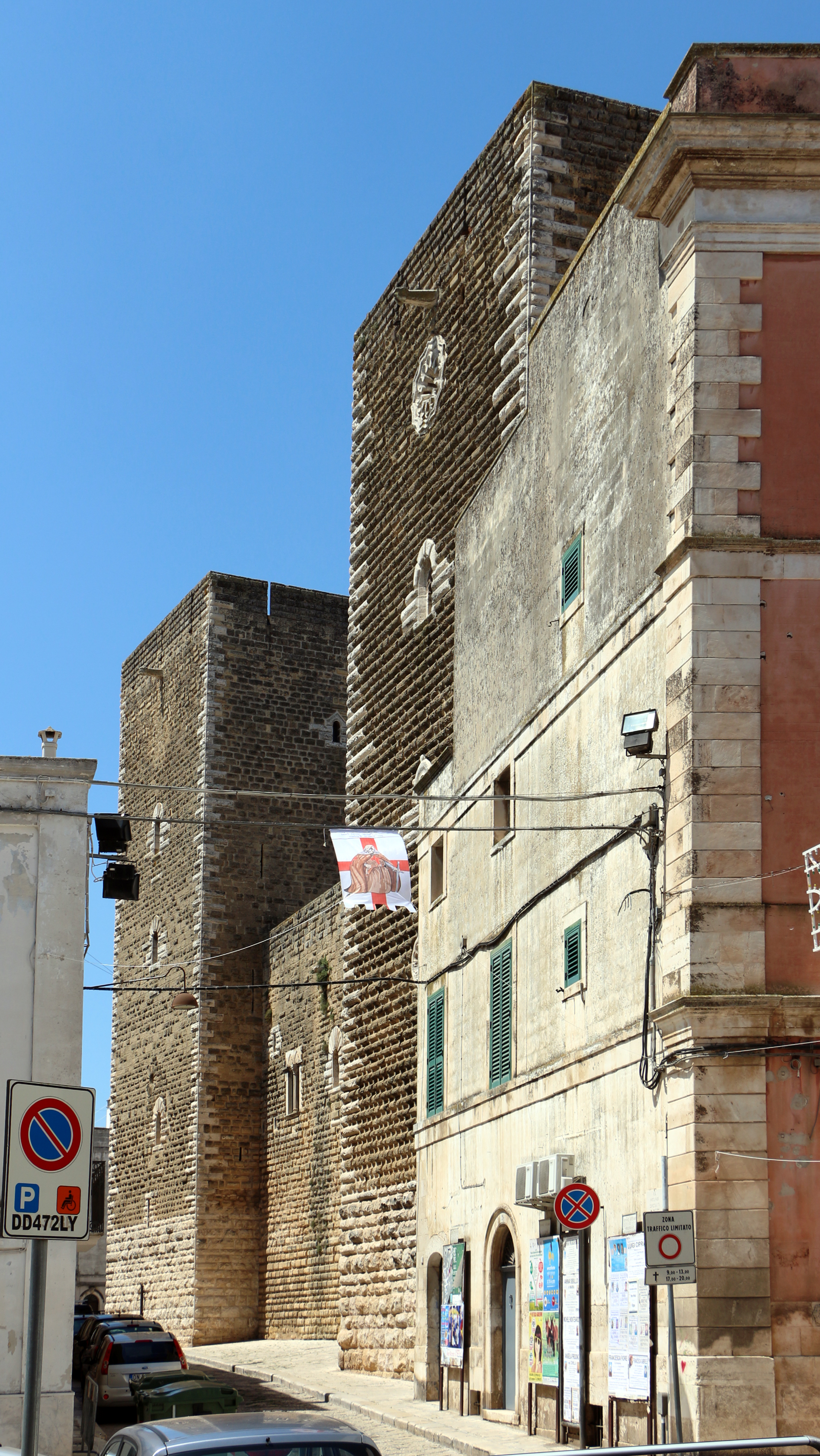
The west fortifications of the castle

The Gioia del Colle Norman-Swabian Castle is the result of at least three construction interventions: one dating back to the Byzantine period, another to the Norman one and the last to the Swabian one. Initially it consisted of a fortified enclosure in stone ashlars. It was enlarged in the 12th century by the Norman Richard of Hauteville, who transformed it into a noble residence.

The final castle arrangement is due to Frederick II of Swabia around 1230. It has a quadrangular courtyard, halls and rooms that overlook it, and is bordered by four corner towers. Of the four original corner towers, which are mentioned in the book the Terra di Gioia both by the architect and tabular book Honofrio Tangho of 1640 and by Gennaro Pinto of 1653, today only two towers remain: that of De 'Rossi and that of the Empress.

The castle permanently houses the Gioia del Colle National Archaeological Museum.

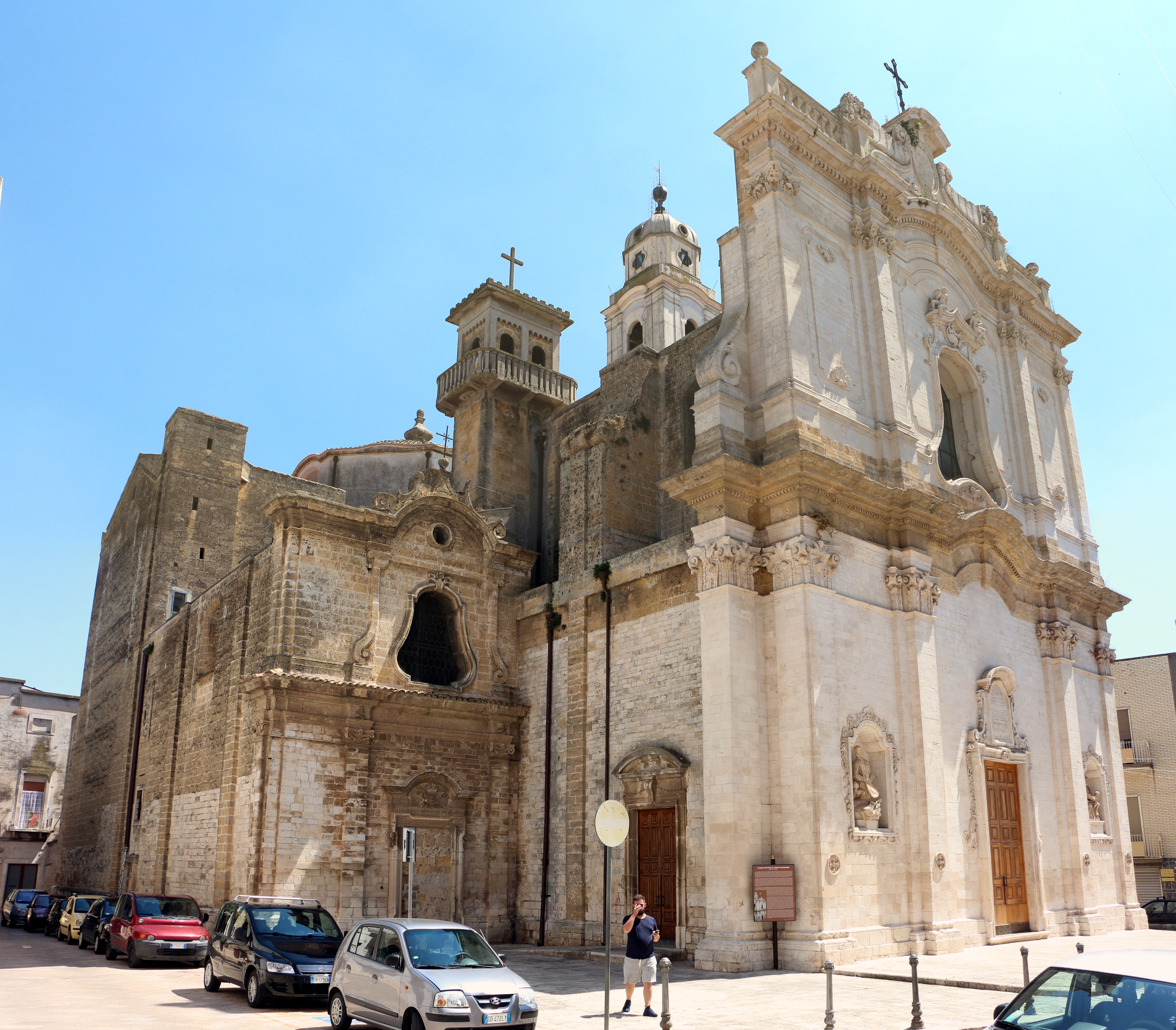
The main Church

=== The main Church ===
It was built towards the end of the 11th century by Riccardo Siniscalco with the name of "Palatine Church of St. Peter". It was initially dedicated to St. Peter, but it was later renamed "Madonna della Neve". The church was destroyed in 1764 by a fire. In the same year the church was rebuilt and dedicated to the nativity of the Blessed Virgin.This period dates back to the two stone sculptures on the front (S. Filippo Neri and the Madonna with the Child in her womb).

The church was damaged again in 1857, by an earthquake. It was then closed to worship. The church's front and the bell tower were restored in 1893.

The downfall of the bell tower dates back to 1942 and it is due to structural instability between the part built in the 12th century and that of 1893.

The Baptismal Books were established in the church in 1575 and the Registers of the Dead in 1584.

It has inside numerous frescoes dating back to different historical periods and a crypt in which the body of Prince Carlo III De' Mari is buried. It was rebuilt over the centuries, it still retains the original jamb of the entrance door and a sarcophagus used as a washbasin (preserved in the sacristy).

=== Other churches ===
- Parrocchia Sacro Cuore
- Parrocchia Santa Lucia
- Parrocchia San Vito
- Parrocchia Immacolata di Lourdes
- Parrocchia Madonna di Loreto
- Chiesa San Rocco
- Chiesa Sant'Angelo
- Chiesa Sant'Andrea
- Chiesa San Domenico
- Chiesa San Francesco
- Chiesa del Crocifisso
- Chiesa della Candelora
- Chiesa Maria SS.Annunziata
- Chiesa San Giuseppe lavoratore

=== Cassano distillery ===
Gioia area has always been interested in an important wine production, which in the past centuries found a market especially in France. When this trade was closed as a result of the protectionist measures of 1887 between Italy and France, producers began distilling the large quantities of unsold wine to produce cognac and alcoholic beverages.

Following the example of others, in 1891 Paolo Cassano had a distillery set up inside the Cassano farm. The activity of the factory continued until 1914 (in this period the Italian Fides Cognac was born, the best known cognac produced in Gioia), when the company was put into liquidation due to a series of concomitant negative factors that had reduced it excellent profitability. First of all an epidemic of phylloxera which decimated the vineyards of the whole Puglia; furthermore, in 1912 there was a notable increase in taxation together with the abolition of tax rebates for cognac producers.

The distillery passed to the Taranto family which kept in a state of neglect. In 1970 it was then sold to the USL (today public local health authority) to renovate it into a hospital. In 1997 the building was again sold to the municipality of Gioia del Colle.

The ancient distillery represented a pioneering example of the Apulian industry. Due to these considerations the Ministry of Cultural and Environmental Heritage has sanctioned its historical importance with the inscription in the list of monumental and environmental assets with a binding decree of 26 September 1992.

Renovated since 2006, the distillery occasionally hosts exhibitions and festivals, such as the mozzarella festival held in August.

=== Natural areas ===
The Boschi Romanazzi are an oasis managed by WWF Italy.

== Society ==
=== Demographic evolution ===
Registered inhabitants:

=== Foreign ethnicities and minorities ===
- Albanian, 393
- Moroccan, 279
- Romanian, 243
- Indian, 58
- Georgian, 52
- Chinese, 30

== Culture ==
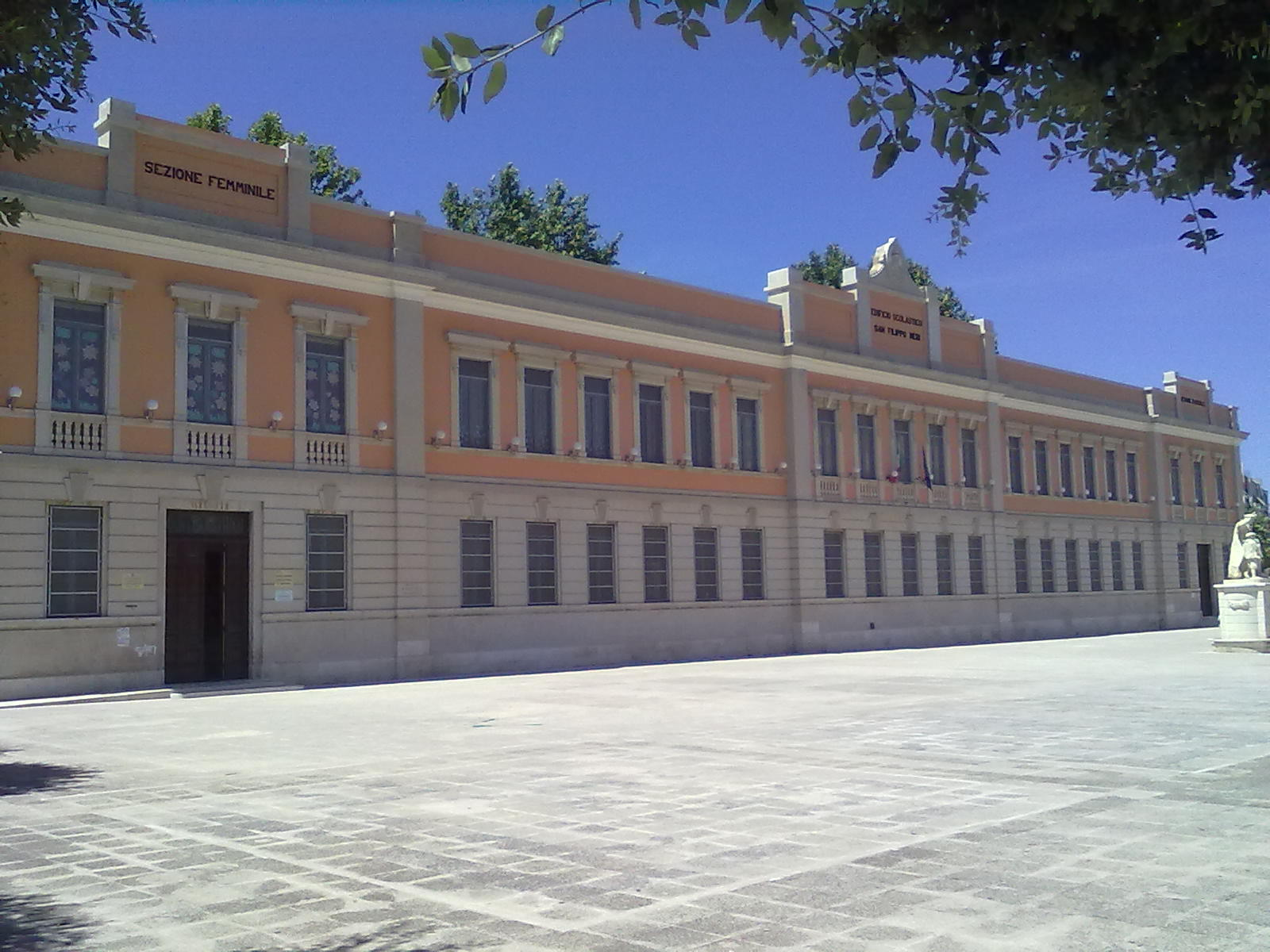
San Filippo Neri primary school.

=== Instruction ===
==== Schools ====
In Gioia del Colle there are 5 kindergartens, 4 primary schools and 2 lower secondary schools. The secondary schools which are located in the city are: the "Ricciotto Canudo" liceo scientifico, the "Publio Virgilio Marone" liceo classico and the "Galileo Galilei" industrial technical institute.

=== Museums ===
==== National archeologic museum ====
The Archaeological Museum's rooms are set up inside the Norman-Hohenstaufen Castle. There is a systematic exposure of the numerous grave items from the necropolis of Mount Sannace and Santo Mola which cover a wide chronological period. From the beginning of the 6th to the 2nd century BC. geometric and figurative vases, bronze weapons, fibulae and clay statuettes define the usual composition of the funerary objects of the indigenous center but also of the wider Peucete communities.

==== Monte Sannace Archaeological Park ====
The site is 5 km away from the town in the direction of Turi and it has been the subject of archaeological excavations since 1957 by the Superintendence of Antiquities of Puglia and Matera. The excavations have been completed in 1961, they brought to light a settlement of the ancient Peucezi dating back to the 9th century BC. which lasted, with brief interruptions, until the Hellenistic-Roman period (approximately until the 1st century AD).

The archaeological park includes some defensive circuits' areas and the north gate includes numerous tombs and various buildings of the acropolis, as well as a large part of the town.

The finds from the excavations are kept in the National Archeological Museum located inside the Norman-Swabian Castle.

=== Cinema ===
Besides having given birth to Ricciotto Canudo, who during his stay in Paris increased the debate around the art of cinema, Gioia del Colle is linked to cinema for having hosted the set of three films, in different eras:

- Between 1930 and 1931 some shots of the silent film Idillio, directed by Milanese Nello Mauri, were shot in the city center and in the countryside around Gioia.
- In 1964 Pier Paolo Pasolini for the film The Gospel According to St. Matthew whose Gioia del Colle Castle to shoot two scenes: Herod's palace and Salomé's dance, which took place in the north wing of the building's courtyard. The expulsion from the temple, with the priests who attend the events, was filmed – instead – in Castel del Monte.
- In 1999, Terra bruciata was set there, Fabio Segatori's debut film with Raoul Bova, Giancarlo Giannini, Michele Placido and Bianca Guaccero.
- In 2014 Matteo Garrone chose the Norman-Swabian castle of Gioia del Colle to set some scenes from the film Tale of Tales with Salma Hayek, Vincent Cassel and Toby Johnes.

=== Music ===
- The Gioia del Colle Music Band won the Venice International Competition in 1924 and the Professional Competition in Rome in 1929.
- Since 1998 the international music competition Pietro Argento Award has been held in Gioia del Colle.
- In 2012, from the initiative of numerous musicians from Gioia, Rockerella was born, a project of production, historical research, census and coordination of alternative music by Gioia del Colle, which becomes a festival of the same name and produces two compilations and the documentary "Rockerella, history of Gioia del Colle's music from the 1950s to the present day ".

=== Theaters ===
- Rossini municipal theater

=== Events ===
- Festa Patronale di San Filippo Neri, 25 – 26 – 27 maggio;
- Festa del compatrono San Rocco, 15 – 16 agosto;
- Processione dei Sacri Misteri della Passione, Venerdì Santo;
- Festival Internazionale TeatroLab2.0 – Chièdiscena, aprile – maggio;
- Palio delle Botti, agosto.

== Economy ==
Gioia del Colle is famous for its mozzarella and Gioia del Colle Primitivo wine. There are also important producers of pasta and extra virgin olive oil. Agriculture, dairy industries, cellars, pasta factories and oil mills together with commercial enterprises represent the economic engine of this country. Ansaldo Caldaie was present with a plant for the construction of large industrial boilers, a leader in the international field.

Red, white, rose, sweet dolce and fortified liquoroso wines are permitted in the Italian wine DOC of the area. Red and rose wine grapes are limited to a harvest yield of 12 tonnes/ha while white wine grapes are limited to a yield of 13 tonnes/ha. The reds and roses are a blend of 50–60% Primitivo, a 40–50% blend component of Montepulciano, Sangiovese, Negroamaro and Malvasia (with Malvasia being further limited to a 10% maximum). The whites are composed of 50–70% Trebbiano with other permitted local grape varieties, such as Pampanuto, making up the remainder. A varietal Primitivo wine is permitted, provided the wine is 100% composed of the grape with yields limited to 8 tonnes/ha and a minimum alcohol level of 13%. The dolce wine of the area is composed of at least 85% Aleatico with a 15% maximum blend component of Malvasia, Negroamaro and Primitivo making up the rest. The grapes must also be limited to a harvest yield of 8 tonnes/ha and have a minimum alcohol level of 15%. The liquoroso version must have a minimum alcohol of 18.5%.

== Infrastructure and transport ==
=== Streets ===
The main Gioia del Colle's road districts of Gioia del Colle are:

- Autostrada A14 Bologna-Taranto, Gioia del Colle exit.
- Strada statale 100 di Gioia del Colle.

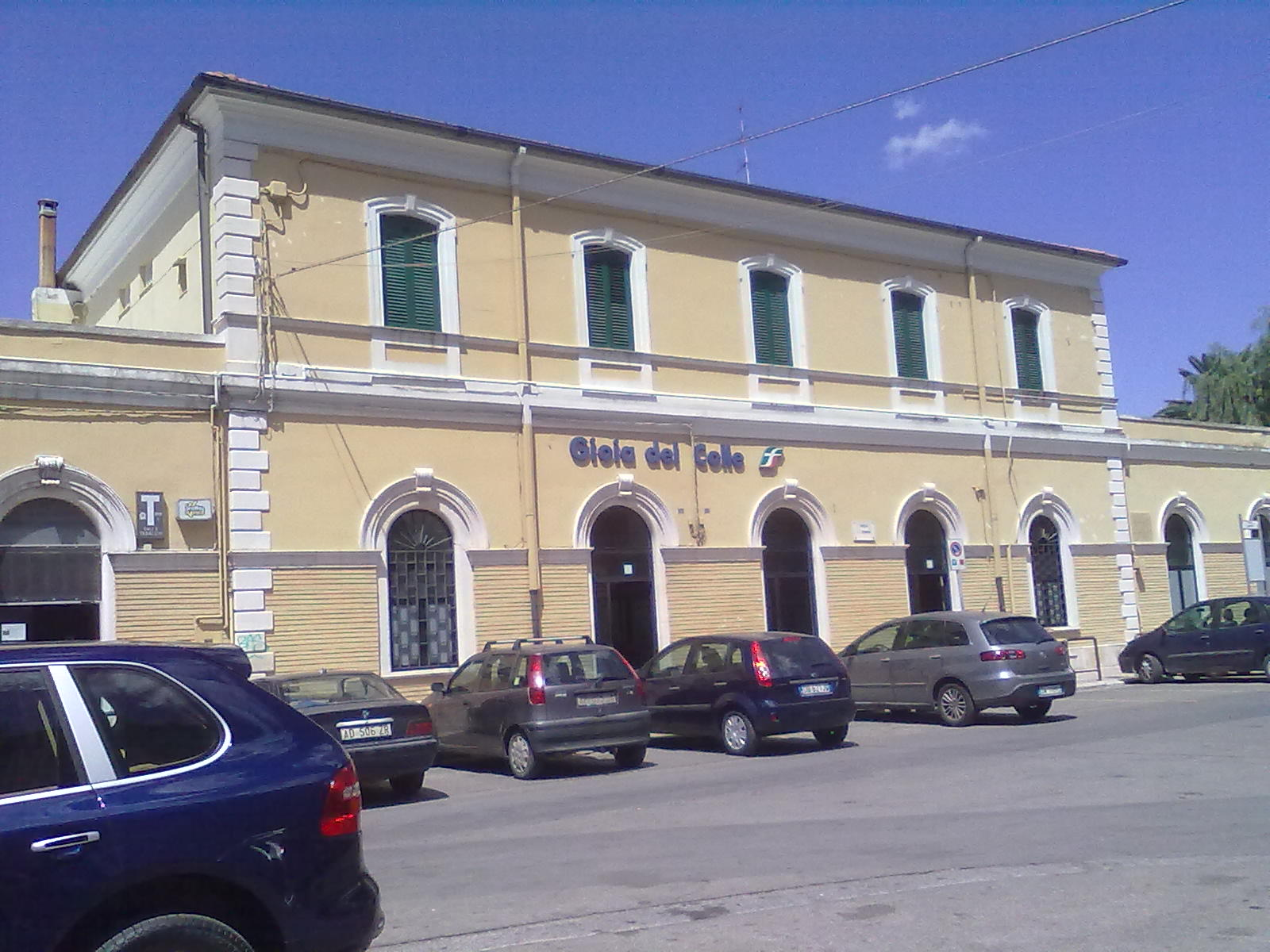
Gioia del Colle train station.

The train station is on the Bari–Taranto railway and it is Gioia del Colle–Rocchetta Sant'Antonio line.

=== Airports ===
The 36th Stormo of the Italian Air Force is at Gioia del Colle "Antonio Ramirez" air base.

=== Urban mobility ===
Urban public transport is a service made available by the municipal administration and managed by the Sabato Viaggi company. The network consists of two circular lines, two lines serving the Termosud area, two lines for the industrial area and two lines connecting the main school sites in the municipality of Gioia del Colle.

== Administration ==
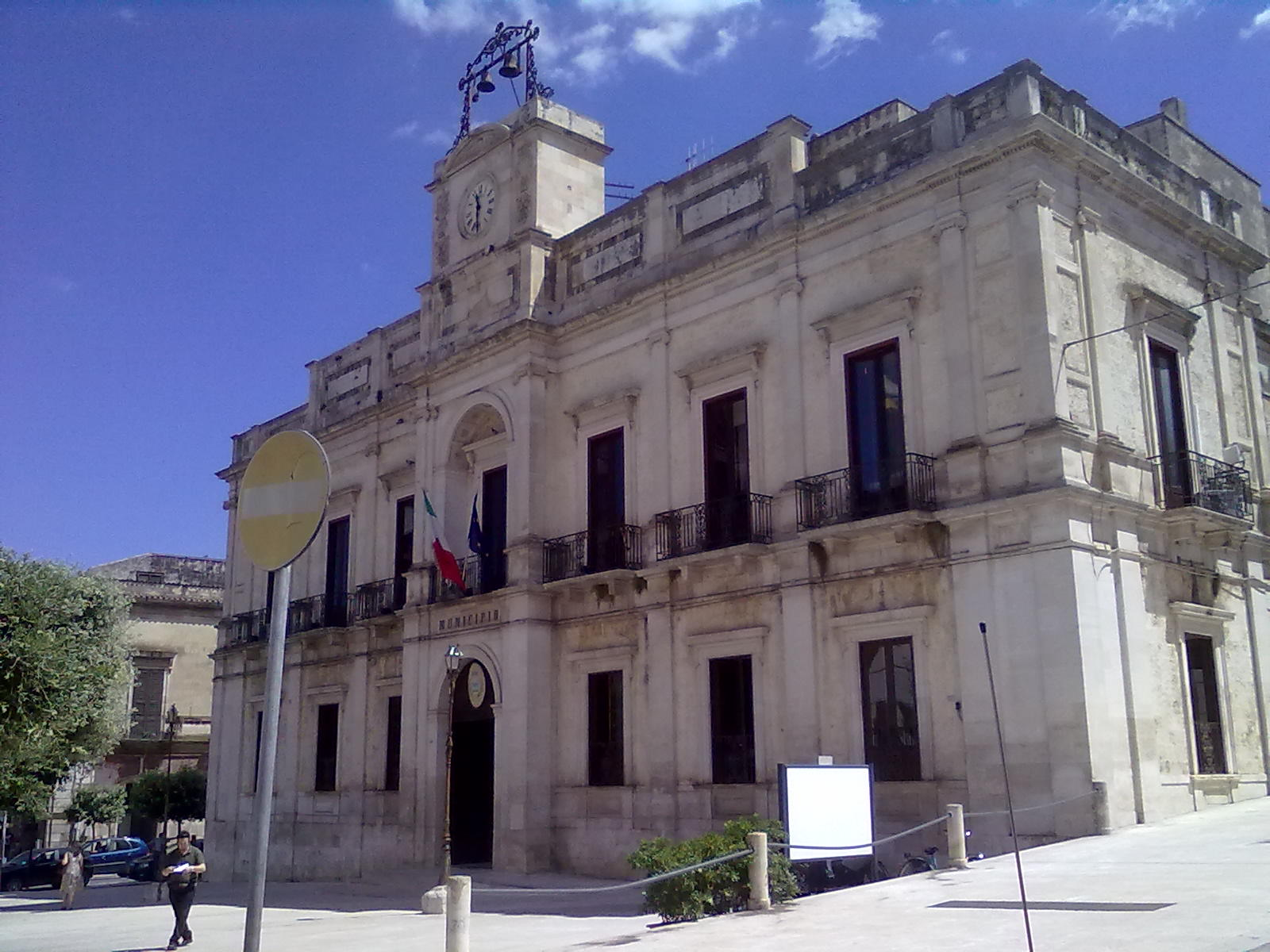
San Domenico palace, town hall seat.

| Period | | Office holder | Party | Title | Notes |
|---|---|---|---|---|---|
| 15 novembre 1986 | 18 giugno 1991 | Angelo Longo | DC | Sindaco | |
| 18 giugno 1991 | 21 dicembre 1991 | Giuseppe Gallo | DC | Sindaco | |
| 21 dicembre 1991 | 11 agosto 1992 | Vincenzo Martinelli | DC | Sindaco | |
| 11 agosto 1992 | 28 gennaio 1993 | Antonio Domenico Ludovico | DC | Sindaco | |
| 28 gennaio 1993 | 10 settembre 1993 | Pasquale De Leonardis | DC | Sindaco | |
| 10 settembre 1993 | 8 maggio 1995 | Luciana Perrotta; Ubaldo Basta; Luciano Marzano | | Commissione straordinaria | |
| 8 maggio 1995 | 14 giugno 2004 | Sergio Povia | PDS / DS | Sindaco | |
| 14 giugno 2004 | 23 ottobre 2007 | Vito Mastrovito | DS | Sindaco | |
| 23 ottobre 2007 | 29 aprile 2008 | Claudio Palomba | | Commissario | |
| 29 aprile 2008 | 7 novembre 2011 | Piero Longo | PdL | Sindaco | |
| 7 novembre 2011 | 22 maggio 2012 | Maria Filomena Dabbicco | | Commissario | |
| 22 maggio 2012 | 9 marzo 2015 | Sergio Povia | PD | Sindaco | |
| 9 marzo 2015 | 23 giugno 2016 | Rossana Riflesso | | Commissario | |
| 23 giugno 2016 | 18 maggio 2018 | Donato Lucilla | lista civica | Sindaco | |
| 18 maggio 2018 | 27 maggio 2019 | Umberto Postiglione | | Commissario | |
| 27 maggio 2019 | in carica | Giovanni Mastrangelo | centrodestra | Sindaco | |

=== Twinning ===
- Târgoviște, Romania

=== Other administrative information ===
Gioia del Colle is the capital of the South-East Murgia Barese mountain community, which groups together 6 municipalities.

== Sport ==
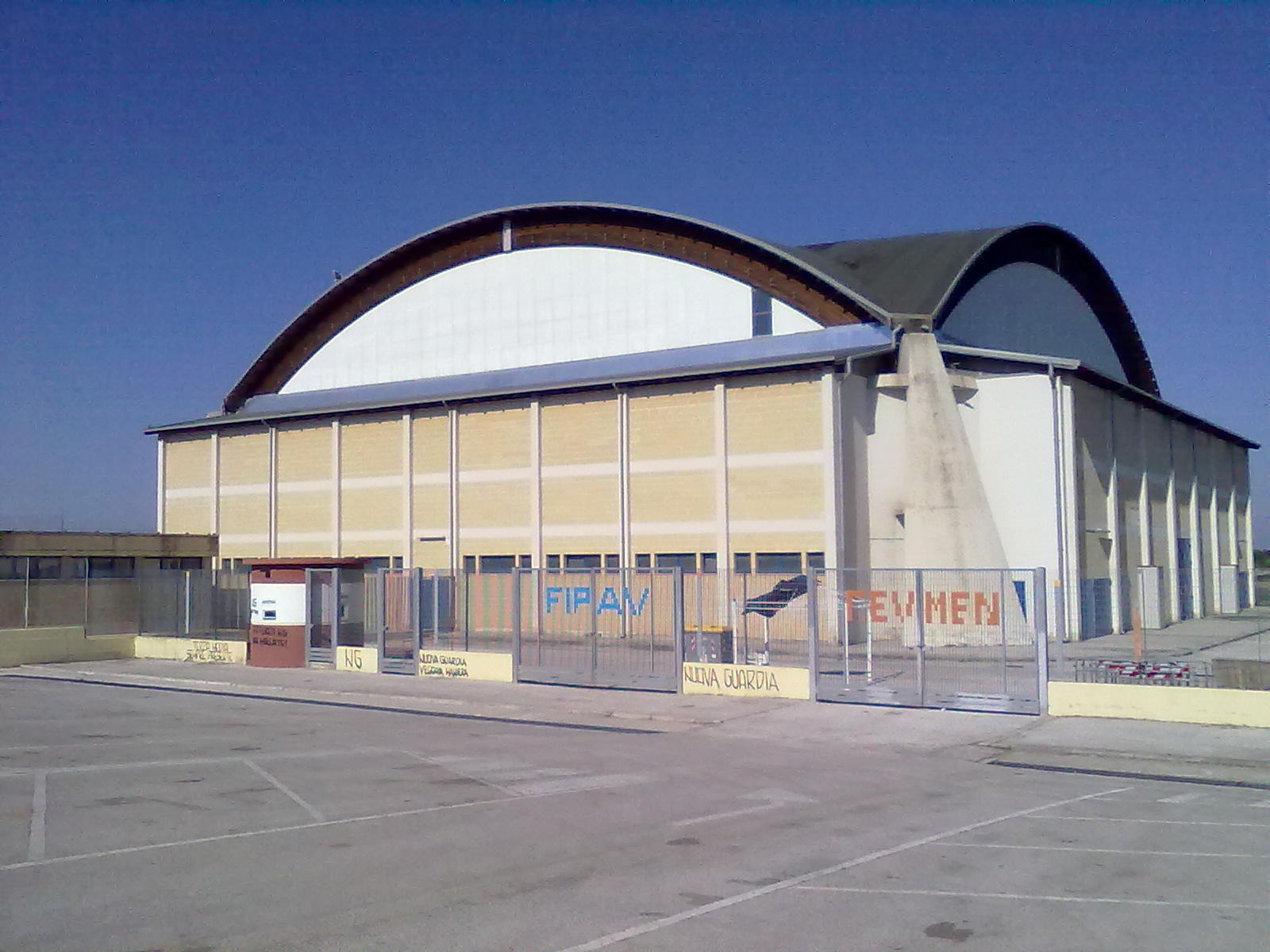
PalaCapurso, home matches seat of the Gioia del Volley.

=== Football ===
The main football team in the city was the A.S.D. Pro Gioia, which played in Group B of the First Category until 2011. It was founded in 1911. The company colors are yellow and black. Currently there is the Partizan Gioia which plays in the Second Category.

=== Volleyball ===
The local volleyball team is the New Real Volley Gioia which plays in the Italian A2 series of men's volleyball. The company colors are white and red. The team inherits the glories of the ASPC Volley Gioia and the Gioia del Volley company which boasted 4 seasons in the top flight: 1994–1995, 1995–1996, 2003–2004 and 2004–2005 as well as a Serie A2 Italian Cup final. Currently the structure that hosts the home matches of the New Real Volley Gioia is the PalaCapurso, a sports hall in Gioia del Colle.

After the excellent volleyball tradition started by the main team since 1975, other realities started in the national volleyball scene. The A.S.D. New Volley Joy of women's volleyball plays in the 2012–2013 season in the women's Serie C.

=== Other sports ===
Local rugby team Federiciana Rugby A.S.D. was founded in 2010. It plays in the Apulian Serie C of the Italian Rugby Federation. In 2013 the team was refounded taking the name of Rugby Club Granata A.S.D., relying on a new technical guide. In 2017 the team is tinted pink, to become a women's rugby team at 7.

Basketball is played at a youth level. The A.S.D. Gioia Running was founded in 2012 and it participates in running competitions at the regional level.

Paolo Cantore, Patrizia Castellaneta and Vito Acito are militants in the A.S.D. Archers of the Murgia. They are athletes and they several times won the FITARCO regional title in the discipline of archery. Patrizia Castellanete in 2011 won the title of absolute Italian champion and Paolo Cantore in 2014 won the title of Italian team champion.

=== Sport systems ===
The local stadium is named "P. Martucci" and it is used by the local football teams. The F.I.G.C.-L.N.D. objected to the use of the facilities for rugby matches. Palasport Gioia del Colle is used for volleyball and basketball and it is called PalaCapurso. Finally, there are the PalaKoutnetsov, known as 'Palestrone' where the youth sector matches of Team Volley Joya (the Academy), of New Volley Gioia (Women's C Series) are hosted as well as matches of the youth championships of other Gioia volleyball teams.

== People ==
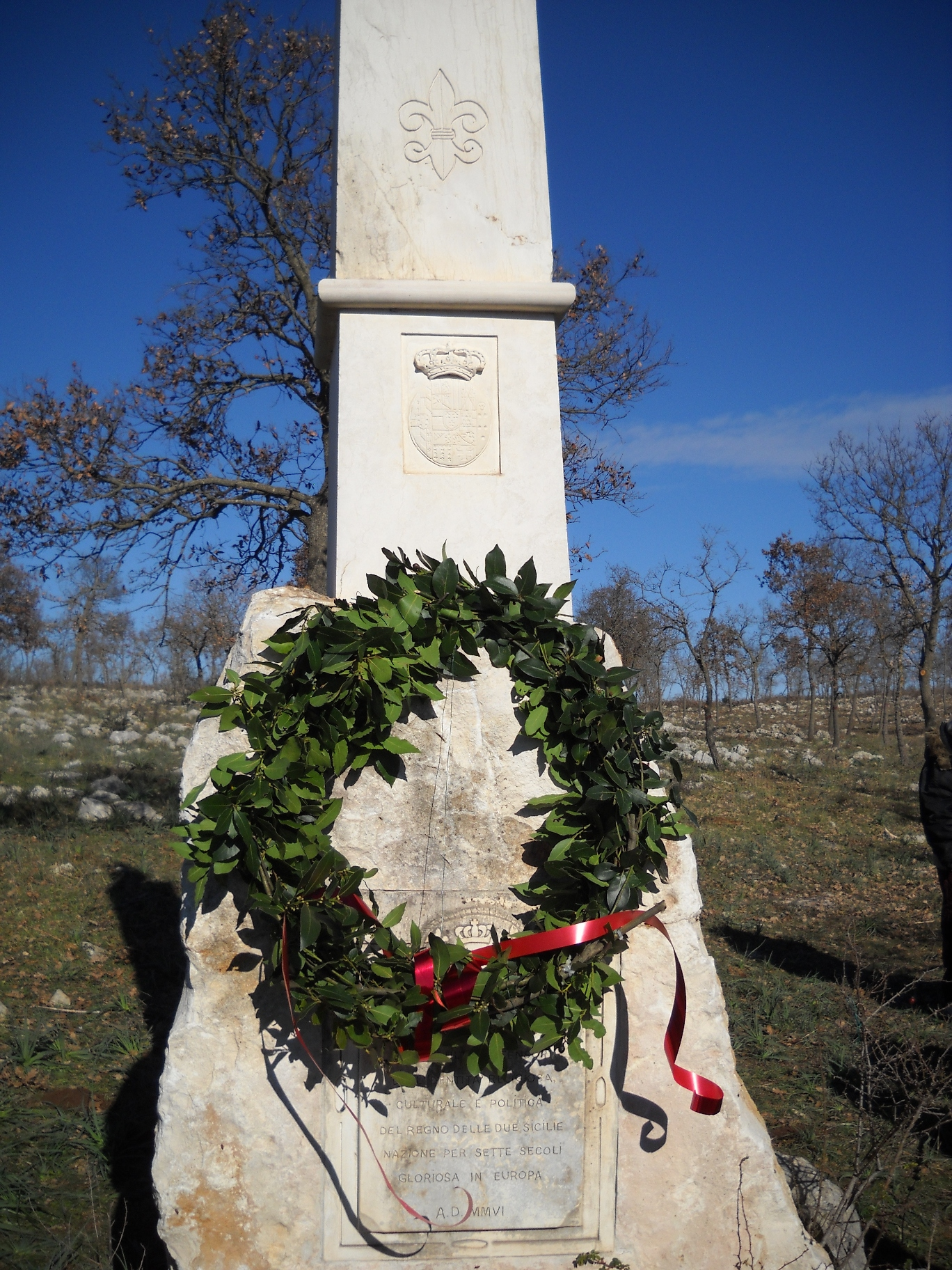
Monument to Sergeant Romano.

- Gigi Angelillo, actor.
- Ricciotto Canudo, intellectual and theorist of the cinema.
- Nicola Legrottaglie, Italian association football player.
- Maurizio Vasco, author and journalist, living in New York City.
- Bob Pisani, journalist CNBC, whose grandfather was from Gioia del Colle
- Frank Stallone Sr., father of Sylvester Stallone, born in Gioia del Colle before emigrating to the United States
- Sergeant Romano, of the Bourbon army. (it.)
- Sebastiano Cantore, actor and character of TV Series "Sebian"
- Pasquale Petrera, grandfather of Pasquale Petrera, MD, born in Gioia before emigrating to the US in 1919.

== Trivia ==
- The song L'onorevole Bricolle by Clara Jaione (1948), which Claudio Villa later famously interpreted, is about the wry story of a fictitious "Honorable Bricolle, a Member of Parliament from Gioia del Colle".
