= Natuzzi =

Italian furniture company

- Type: Joint stock company
- Traded as: NYSE: NTZ
- Industry: Upholstery, manufacturing
- Founded: 1959
- Headquarters: Santeramo in Colle, Italy
- Key people: Pasquale Natuzzi, Founder and Executive Chairman of the Board of Directors Antonio Achille, Chief Executive Officer Antonisa Perrone, Non-executive Director Pasquale Junior Natuzzi, Chief Brand Officer Natuzzi Italia; Executive Director Catrina Damasceno, Chief Creative Officer
- Brands: Softaly; Natuzzi Italia; Natuzzi Editions
- Revenue: €468.5 million (2022)
- Number of employees: 4,053 (2022)
- Website: www.natuzzi.com

Natuzzi S.p.A. (NYSE: NTZ) is an Italian furniture company founded in 1959 by Pasquale Natuzzi, the group's executive board of directors' chairman. The company designs sofas, armchairs, living room accessories, and bedroom furniture. It is headquartered in Santeramo in Colle, Apulia, Italy.

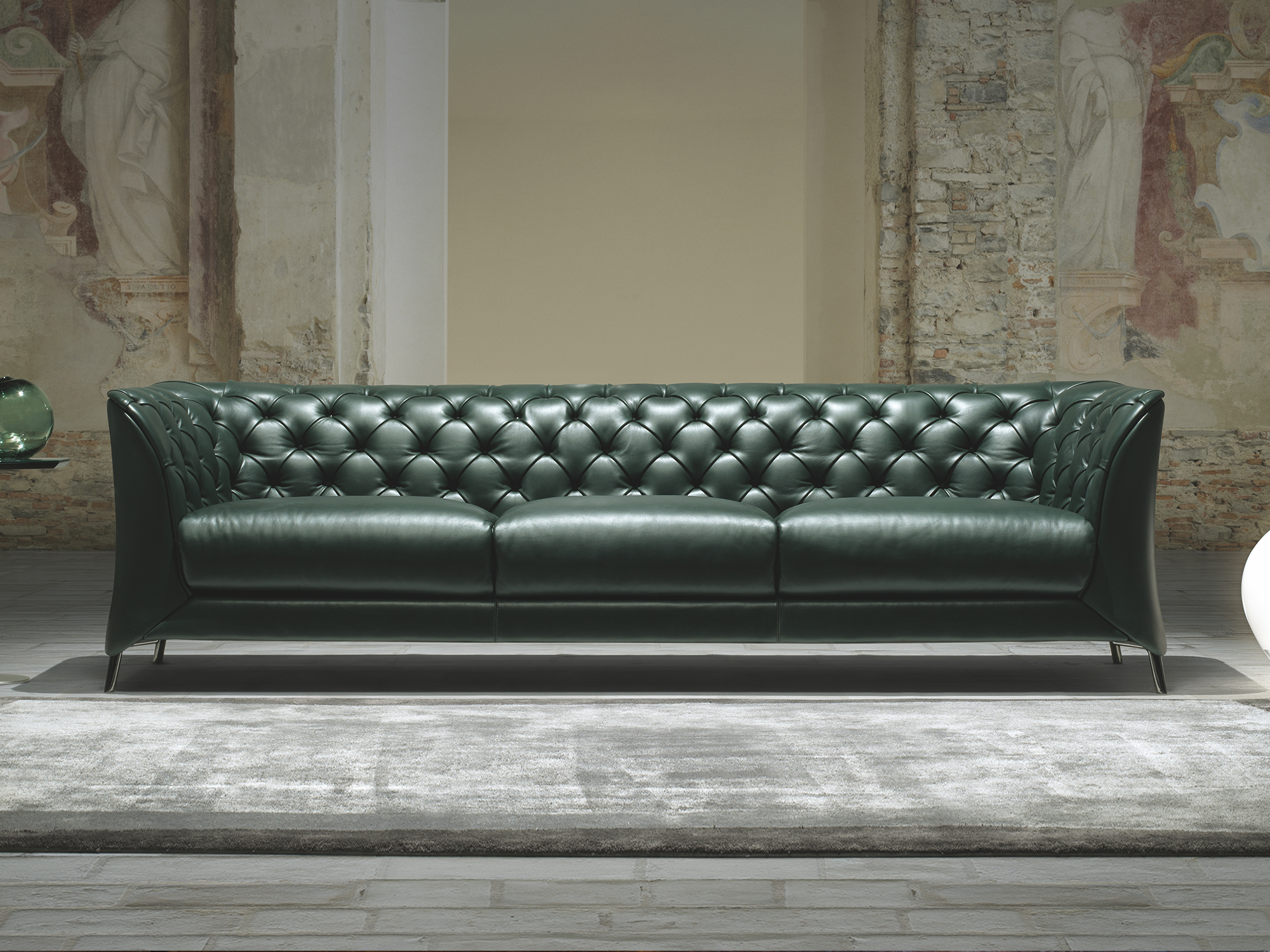

== History ==
Natuzzi was founded in 1959 in Taranto, Italy by Pasquale Natuzzi. The company began industrial production of sofas and armchairs in 1967. In 1972, Natuzzi Salotti S.r.l. was founded. One year later, production was moved to Santeramo in Colle, where the Natuzzi Group's headquarters is currently located.

In 1985, Natuzzi Upholstery Inc., a subsidiary of Natuzzi S.p.A., was established. In 1998, a new building, designed by the architect Mario Bellini, was inaugurated in High Point, North Carolina.

== Natuzzi brands ==
=== Natuzzi Italia ===
Natuzzi Italia is the luxury brand of Natuzzi Group. It markets its products through Natuzzi Store and Natuzzi Gallery.

=== Natuzzi Editions ===
Natuzzi Editions provides upholstery and furnishings.

=== Softaly ===
Softaly is the private label brand of Natuzzi.

== See also ==
- List of companies of Italy

== Bibliography ==
- Agnese Sinisi, Natuzzi Un divano a Wall Street – Milano, Egea, 2008
- Federico Pirro, Angelo Guarini, Grande Industria e Mezzogiorno 1996-2007 – Bari, Cacucci Editore, 2008
- Federico Rampini, L’impero di Cindia – Milano, Mondadori, 2007
- Gianfranco Viesti, Il Sud che attrae - Donzelli Editore, 2002
- Franco Tatò, Perché la Puglia non è la California - BC Dalai Editore, 2002
- Mauro Castelli, Questa Italia siamo noi – Milano - Il Sole 24 Ore, 2000
- Roberto Napoletano, Fatti per vincere - Sperling&Kupfer, 1999
