= Santeramo in Colle =

- Comune
- Comune di Santeramo in Colle
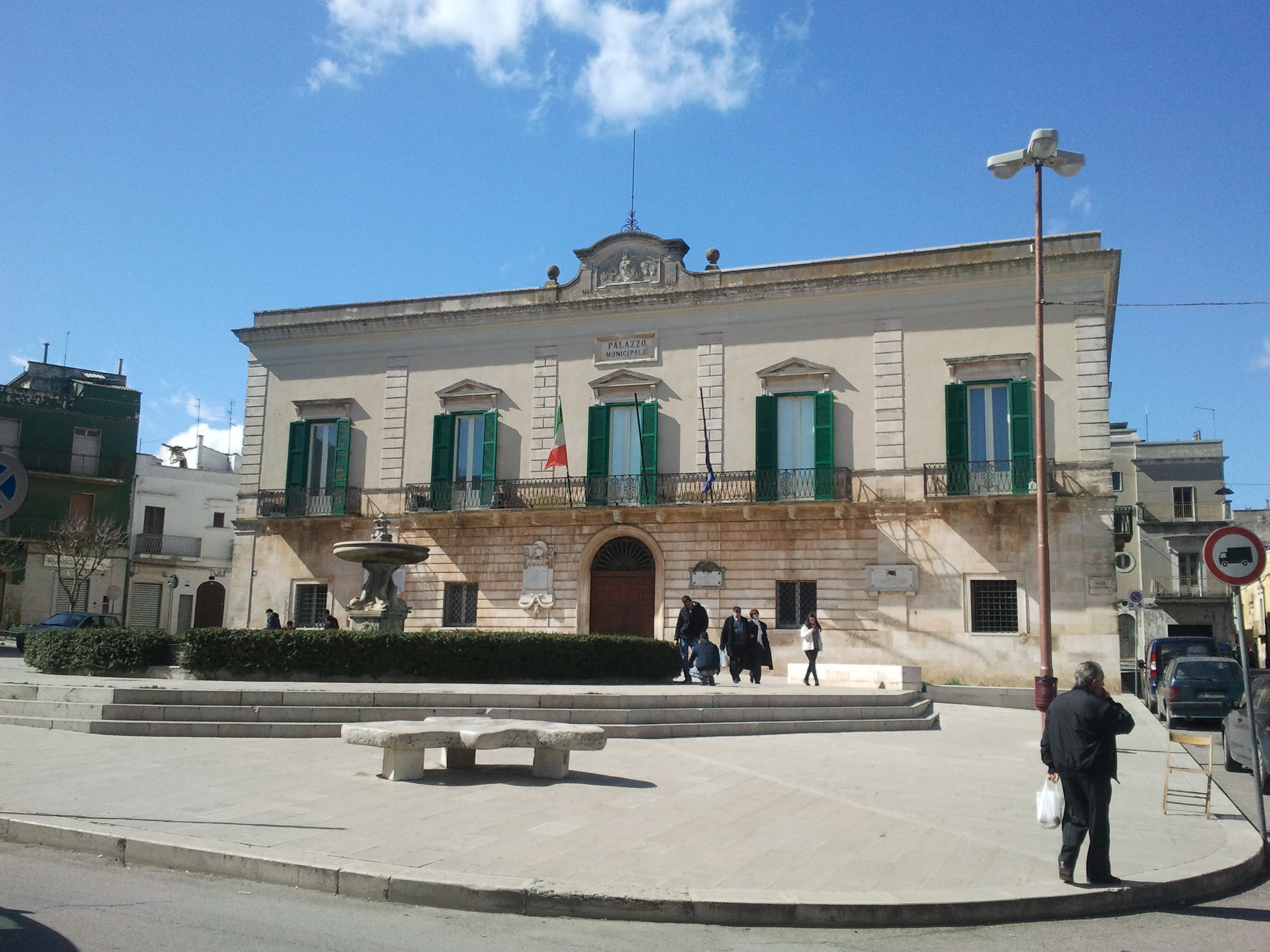

- Location within Italy Location within Apulia
- Coordinates: 40°48′N 16°46′E
- Country: Italy
- Region: Apulia
- Metropolitan city: Bari (BA)

Government
  - Mayor: Vincenzo Casone

Area
  - Total: 144.86 km^{2} (55.93 sq mi)
- Elevation: 514 m (1,686 ft)

Population (30 November 2017)
  - Total: 26,597
  - Density: 183.60/km^{2} (475.53/sq mi)
- Demonym: Santermani
- Time zone: UTC+1 (CET)
  - Summer (DST): UTC+2 (CEST)
- Postal code: 70029
- Dialing code: 080
- Patron saint: Erasmus of Formia
- Saint day: June 2
- Website: Official website

Santeramo in Colle (Santermano: Sanderm) is a town in the Metropolitan City of Bari and region of Apulia, southern Italy.

Its current name comes from St Erasmus, martyr of the Diocletian era and patron saint of the city who, according to legend, is responsible for its founding.

== Physical geography ==
By altitude, Santeramo in Colle is the highest municipality in the metropolitan city of Bari.

The countryside has the typical geomorphological features of the karst territory: a limestone substrate, with rocky out croups and the presence of lamas (Lamalunga, Lamadavruscio, Lamadispina, Lamasinara, Lamadilupo), jazzi (Iazzitello, Iazzo vecchio, Iazzo Sava, Iazzo De Laurentiis, Iazzo De Luca), Sinkhole e Ponor, courts (Corte Finocchio, Curtocarosino, Curtolevacche, Curtopasso, Curtolafica), parks (Parco Giovanni, Parco Lanzano, Parconuovo, Parco del Trullo, Parco Sava, Parco Caldara), lakes (Lago Travato, Lagolupino, Lagolaguardia, Lagopalumbo, Lacometana), mountains (Montefungale, Montefreddo), wells (Pozzo Leone, Pozzopoveriello), fountains (Fontana di tavola, Fontanarosa).

=== Morphology ===
Morphological and vegetative articulation allows to identify three distinct areas: the woods, the Murge, the matine.

==== Woods ====
The wooded area of the territory is the located area in the direction of Bari, so called because in ancient times it saw the presence of vast extensions of oak forest extensions, today almost completely extinct, which have given way to cultivated land and heavily man-made areas. Also on via Alessandriello there is the Denora wood, while on the way to Matera there is the Parata wood.

==== The Murge ====
The Murge are the element that most characterizes the territory of Santeramo and are mainly made up of limestone rocks, which cross from South to North from Serrone to Murgia Sgolgore. Particular are the Quite, on via Alessandriello, characterized by an orderly mesh of dry stone walls (i parate), trulletti (i casédde) and specchie.

==== The matine ====
The Matine, in the direction of Matera, are represented by a vast plain, once marshy, which constitutes the fertile area of the santermano territory and is characterized by extensive cereal cops and the presence of numerous rural settlements.

==== The caves ====
The territory is characterized by numerous karst cavities that create a dense network of underground tunnels.

=== Climate ===
The climate of Santeramo is a temperate continental climate, due to the altitude and the distance from the sea.

The temperature in winter is around +4 °C, while in summer it fluctuates around +21 °C with a high percentage of humidity.

Annual rainfall is around 600 mm. In winter, snow frequently falls, especially in the presence of cold air of Balkan origin, with sometimes considerable accumulations.

In the winter months, fog is frequent, especially in anticyclonic conditions or with southern humid currents, coming from the Ionian Sea.

Santeramo appears to be the coldest place among those falling in the metropolitan city of Bari.

The Italian climatic class is D, the degrees day are 1884.

== Origins of the name ==
The toponym Santeramo has medieval origins.

Several hypotheses have been advanced on the city name, among which there is one that claims it may refer to a place of worship: Santo Luogo dell'Eremo, with the presence of an adjoining monastery, built after the 11th century, to which it was probably introduced the adjective of "Santo". The first document, confirming this hypothesis, which refers to the toponym "Ad Sanctum Eramum" (Santo Eramo / Eramo Santo) appears for the first time in a document "Privilege of Costance", preserved, in original, in the Tabulario di Santa Maria la Nova, and is dated Palermo 1996 December, XVI Ind. Ad Sanctum Eramum probably referred to the role played by the Machaelic cult in the territory. The hermitage of Sant'Angelo.

Another, however, supports the reference to the Martyr Erasmian, a hypothesis also supported by many local scholars. There are paper references from the 12th century (there is a charta dated to 1180). The cult of S. Erasm must have been widespread since before the 11th century.

== History ==
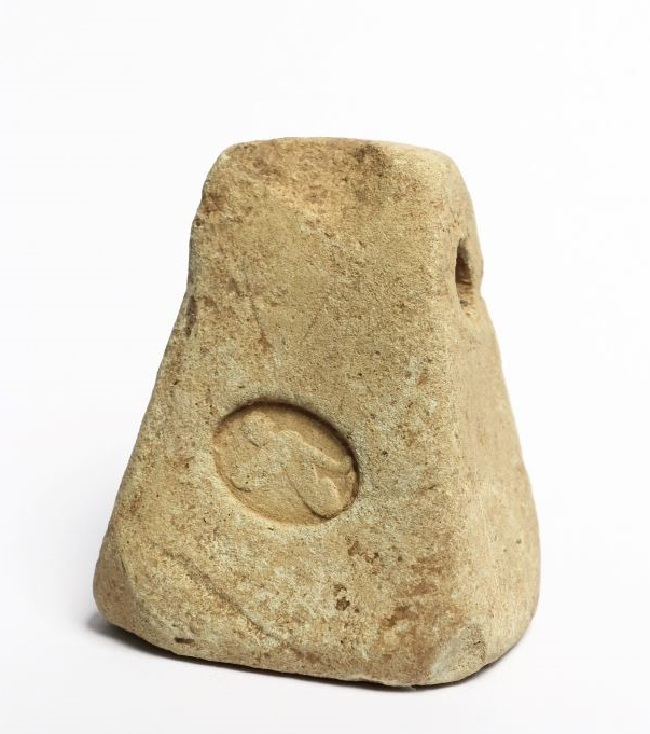
Loom weight with sphinx on both sides. Deposited at the Archaeological Superintendence of Bari.

=== The Antica Lupatia ===
==== The history of pre-Roman Santeramo - the ancient city of Peuceta ====
The modern town of Santeramo, made up of curved walls, is set on an area of very ancient frequentation. The foundations of the ancient town are formed by three side by side alignments of shapeless limestone blocks, with a foundation thickness of 30–40 cm. Floor beaten in concotto and tuff.

During the excavations that look place in May 1980 in Santeramo, the Superintendency revealed the remains of two settlements attributable to the 9th to 8th and the 5th to 4th centuries BC. A loom weight was also found with the representation of a sphinx on both sides (the only example in Italy), certainly the symbolism of the sphinx and who and why used it must be investigated. The context is key to understanding its meaning. Furthermore, a stove was found consisting of thin superimposed layers of crushed stone, clay and coal, resting on a plane of small limestone slabs, overlooking a large patch of ash and coal (in the report of the excavation of the Archaeological Superintendece of Taranto).

The Peucetians settlement of Santeramo belongs to the typology of centers located inland (inland) and developed on the promontory that dominated the whole surrounding area, a geographical position of control, exploiting the hydrogeomorphological characteristics of the land, corresponding to the fertile territories, torrential furrows of rainwater collection basins, the blades and, in the presence of ancient karst (caves). The presence of the ancient karst lake is confirmed.

=== The Roman phase ===
The Borgo Antico can be divided into the original Peucetian area and the area of subsequent Roman expansion, probably to be ascribed to the period from the presumed reconstruction in the 1st century BC and up to the early centuries AD. The previous Borgo Antico then expanded into the early medieval town surrounded by walls.

An exemplary finding concerns an epighaph found in a garden belonging to Antonio di Santo, which bears the name of the deceased -ELASIV- (subsequently classified (v)/(c)-ELASIV-(s)), and placed by Theodor Mommsen between the Santeramo and gioiese area.

=== The origin of the toponym Lupatia ===
Making a summary of the studies relating to the etymology of the toponym, we find:

Lupatia (lib/lub) Λιβαδιον (valley) G. Colella

(lub-) Root extrude lup- (which is about death) G. Alessio, S. Bekakos

(lib-) Stagnant water G. Alessio (most recent)

Aliba (lib-) Place of worship of water and the e S. Bekakos

=== The foundation of Ancient Lupatia ===
About the date of foundation of Lupatia, or rather of the birth of the poleonym, it is hypothesized at the turn of the 9th and the end of the 7th century BC. Considering the numerous other toponyms around Canosa and their supposed closed-Perugian origin, a high dating would seem more probable. But this obviously requires further confirmation. In these areas of Peucezia, in fact, most of the settlements have been frequented at least since the Apennine culture. By foundation we therefore intend to hypothesize that period of time in which we began to speak of the ancient settlement through the Etruscan root. Therefore, more than a foundation, we should speak of poleonímica connotation.

=== The Neolithic ===
The assiduous human presence in the Santeramo area has been witnessed since the Neolithic, given the discovery of many elements belonging to this historical phase, specifically in the area known as Le Matine, located south of the current city center and characterized by flat soil, first marshy at the end of the seconda fase sub-boreale and then wooded in the Neolithic, due to probable reclamation in the epoca romana.

=== The entrenched Neolithic village of Masseria Fontana di Tavola of Talve ===
The site of Masseria Fontana di Tavola is located along the Via Appia Antica (also called 'Via Tarantina'), which delineates the border between Santeramo in Colle and Matera. It is located in the locality of Valzerosso, near a small valley crossed by a branch of the Silica, on a flat area which, proceeding eastwards, ends with a slight difference in height. Currently the area is privately owned and a cereal farm has been set up there.

Etymologically, the place name would mean 'Source of the River Talvo'. In fact this area must have been the source of this watercourse which flanked the city of Castellaneta and of which various sources speak from the Roman period up to more recent times. To cite a few: «CASTELLANETTA: west of Metula, on the Talvo river. It has a Suffragan Bishopric of the Archbishop of Taranto».

The quantity of ceramic fragments found can be ascribed to the chronological horizon between the Neolithic, the Eneolithic and the Bronze Age, collected on the site of Masseria Fontana di Tavola. The study of the ceramic finds has led to believe that the area was frequented and occupied more assiduously during the Ancient Neolithic, given the preponderance of archaic impressed ceramics (especially in the area between Altamura and Santeramo in Colle). In this regard, Damiana Santoro argued that "the findings denote a more widespread population during the Early Neolithic phase; in the Middle-Recent Neolithic there seems to be a tendency towards a thinning out, or rather a concentration of the inhabited areas, probably as a result of changing needs to be reconnected to different environmental climatic conditions". The analysis of the findings of Masseria Fontana di Tavola allows us to verify that the side had a period of re-occupation during the Neolithic-Final, considering the large number of Diana-style fragments, in the inhabited areas and a resettlement found also in other areas of southern Italy, only to be re-dimensioned again during the Eneolithic and the Bronze Age.

=== The entrenched Neolithic village of Masseria Grottillo ===
Within the landscape of the Upper Murgia of Santeramo in Colle, the remains of the entrenched Neolithic village of Masseria Grottillo are identified, which are of considerable interest from an archaeological point of view. The entrenched Neolithic village was identified by Materano scholar Gianfranco Leonetti, in the field of topographic research and subject only to the constraint of the Archaeological Superintendency of Taranto - Dr. Donata Venturo on 26 May 1997 and has been studied since then. The village is currently in a state of neglect.

=== The large Peuceta settlement of Masseria Di Santo and Bonifacio ===
On the basis of some studies, it emerged that the archaeological site in question is located in the area of the Di Santo and Bonifacio farms S-SE of the town of Santeramo in Colle, height of 360 m. The site dominates the valley below and is crossed by ancient paths, N-NS and E-ES, not easily definable in time, which reached the Viglione farm, which coincides with Sublupatia, a station of the Via Appia. The Biancofiore, had been, as today, a sorting center of different roads. Like Sublupatia, which was not only a station of the Via Appia, but also the node from where the connection to the Minucia, briefly testified by the Tabula Peutingeriana which also in the area no longer shows the Via Appia, but with greater precision by the Cosmographia Anonimo Ravennatis and by the Guidonis Geographia.

The Peuceti settlements were often located in the vicinity if the villages occupied in prehistoric times. The site in question, in fact, is about 500 meters away from the well-known Neolithic village of Masseria Grottillo about 3 km from the Ancient Appian Way. The site had been reported to the Archaeological Superintendency of Taranto starting from 1980 by the Honorary Inspector Gianni De Santis. Mangiatordi tells us nothing new, writes only that on the site: ceramic fragments ascribable to the late Republican age and the early age were collectd imperiale. To confirm the importance of the site is C. S. Fioriello, of the University of Bari, in 2017 after a detailed inspection.

In the area many fragments of indigenous and linear geometric pottery, black painted pottery, African sealed earth are scattered over the entire surface. Late Roman painted and kitchen pottery, various tiles, fragments of sarcophagi and hundreds of loom weights and a bronze loom weight (in peasant possession) 10 cm high.

In the area between Masseria Bonifacio and Masseria Di Santo, in the absence of scientific excavation, despite the quantity of findings that would allow us to formulate certain hypotheses on the characteristics of the settlement, it is possible to hypothesize the presence of a residential nucleus of significant socio-economy entity, given the proximity, even of two probable villas of the imperial age recognized in the nearby Masseria Bonifacio.

In the area of Masseria Bonifacio, there is an olive grove at the entrance of which there is a hypogeum, the epicenter of the entire area of the Di Santo Bonifacio farms.

The hypogeum is an underground system, 10 meters long, which has a relevant geological, geomorphological, archaeological and historical interest. From the main access, you can reach a succession of huge saloons. The cave has a karst and hypogea nature and there are fossilized remains on the wall. It's an inlet, which was artificially closed with carry-over material and boulder, that block the access to others rooms. Inside it, have been found the silvers of pottery and bones, which date from Neolothic to others age. Among them are reported: a Greek Obol from the 4th century, 3 fragments, that are part of a tray, so described by dr. Philip Kenrick: Rectengular tray made with African sealed ceramic (7th figure). Two fragments made with fine red clay and a barely shiny red flap belong to a rectangular rely, which is decorated with embossed mould. These trays were built at the central Tunisian production site in Sidi Marzouk Tounis and they have been dated approximately (from silver prototypes) to the second half of the 4th Century AD. The fragments from Masseria Bonifacio's cave come from the edge of a unique tray depicting scenes from Achille's life. There is a complete example in Monaco's Archäologische Staatssammlung (ex Prähistorische Staatssammlung) (Garbsch 1980, 1982, 100 n.36). The two fragments of Masseria Bonifacio show: a hare supported by its hind legs by a centaur (towards the left end of the bottom edge); a sitting woman spinning, who is portrayed as Deidameia, one of Achille's admirers when it hidden about the king Lycomede at the court in Skyros (towards the lower end of the right side). The theme of this Tray, has also been discussed in detail by Mackensen (2004). The shape of the ship is Hayes (1972), mentioned as such in Anselmino. The African lamp's shape is Hayes (1972) Typer II, (fine-grained fabric, neat and sharp decoration) from central Tunisia. The pattern of the disc is a chi-rho symbol, with the rho inverted: for similar examples, watch Bailey 1988, n. Q1755-7. Dated around 400-500 d.C.

The hypogeum was fixed in the past for the burials and later, in the 4th or 5th century BC, was used as a refuge (to confirm this dating, it's the construction techniques of the inner walls).

=== Hellenism ===
The Greek phase of Santeramo, characterized by the presence of Japygian ceramics and the persistence of forms in polished dough of the proto-Villanovan tradition, finds numerous elements of comparison in the phase of Gravina I, dated from 825 to 725 BC. And, in particular, significant are the numerous and punctual comparisons with the decorative motifs found in the geometric ceramic of Gravina, recently inserted by Yntema in the most ancient phase of the iapigia production, dated in a chronological period ranging from the 9th to the beginning of the 8th century BC. The analogies with Gravina I are obviously not accidental, if we consider the position of the two located, such as the nearby centres of Altamura and Monte Sannace, in the hinterland of Peucezia, on the edge of the Murgic plateau, etc. etc." The "Borgo Antico" can be divided into the original Peucetian area and the area of subsequent "Roman" expansion, probably due to the period from the presumed reconstruction in the 1st century BC. and up to the first centuries AD.

=== Middle Ages ===
The Norman period is characterized by the study of the Catalogus Baronum, just as the study of the Statutum de reparatione castrorum is fundamental for the Swabian age. This last study deals with an investigation that Federico II started on the basis of the Norman models, on the localities required to repair the royal fortresses.

The domus were particularly numerous in Apulia: out of eighty-two building structures listed in the Statutum de reparatione, thirty-five were such, most of which located in the Capitanata area. In this territory favored by Frederick II their number (twenty-eight) exceeded that of the castra (twenty-three), while in the Land of Bari we find only three compared to thirteen castras and, similarly, in the Terra d'Otranto only two compared to thirteen castras. The domus of the Capitanata were located in Apricena, S. Eleuterio, Rignano Garganico, Sala, S. Chirico, Lama, Fiorentino, Guardiola, Visciglieto, Lucera (masseria), Castiglione, Foggia, Pantano-S, Lorenzo, S. Spirito di Gulfiniano, Incoronata, Salpi, S. Maria "de Mari", S. Maria "de Salina", Trinitapoli, Ponte Albanito, Orta, Ordona, Stornara, Cerignola, Celano, Salsiburgo, S. Maria "in Bircis", Girofalco. In the rest Puglia, they were located in Garagnone, Gravina, Santeramo, Castellaneta, Girofalco e Montalbano; in the area of Basilicata they were located in Gaudiano, S. Nicola d'Ofanto, Cisterna, Lavello, Boreano, Lagopesole, Montemarcone, Monteserico e Agromonte.

=== Modern era ===
The phenomenon of post-unit brigandage also developed in Santeramo in Colle, bands of town brigands and also bands of other brigands such as Carmine Crocco operated.

=== Symbols ===
The coat of arms and the banner were granted with the royal decree dated 6 September 1934.

== Monuments and places of Interest ==
=== Religious architecture ===
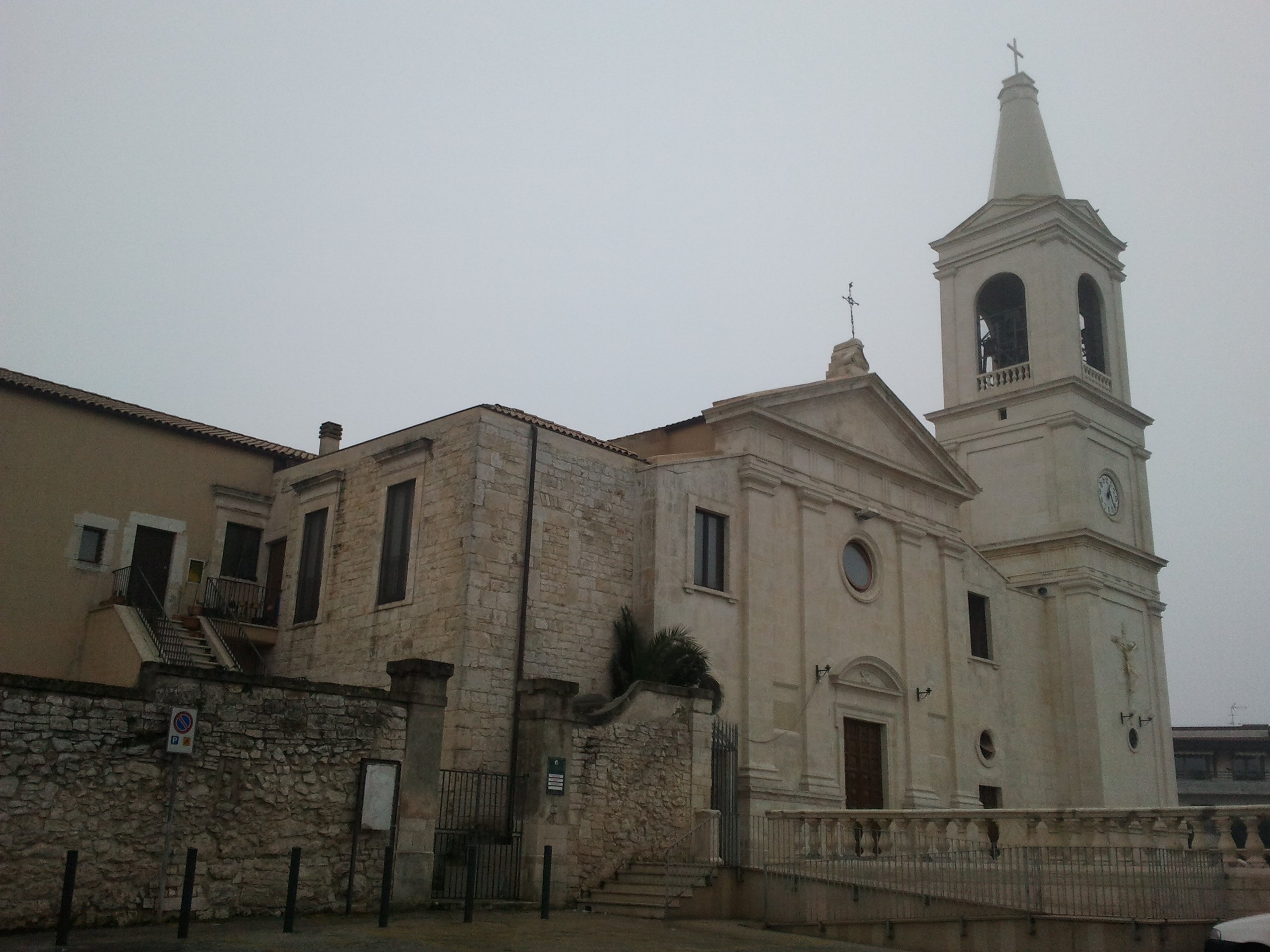
Parrocchia SS Crocifisso

- Cathedral Church of Sant'Erasmo Vescovo and Martire
- Parish Church of Sacro Cuore
- Parish church of Santissimo Crocifisso with annex Monastero Francescano
- church of Maria Santissima del Carmine with annex Monastero Benedettino
- Church of Sant'Eligio Vescovo
- Church of San Giuseppe
- Church of Maria Santissima Annunziata
- Church of Santa Lucia Vergine e Martire
- Church of San Domenico di Guzmàn
- Church of Maria Santissima della Pietà (Addolorata)
- Church of Maria Santissima del Rosario of Pompei (Monfortani)
- Church of Maria Santissima di Fatima in locality Jazzitiello

=== Civil architectures ===
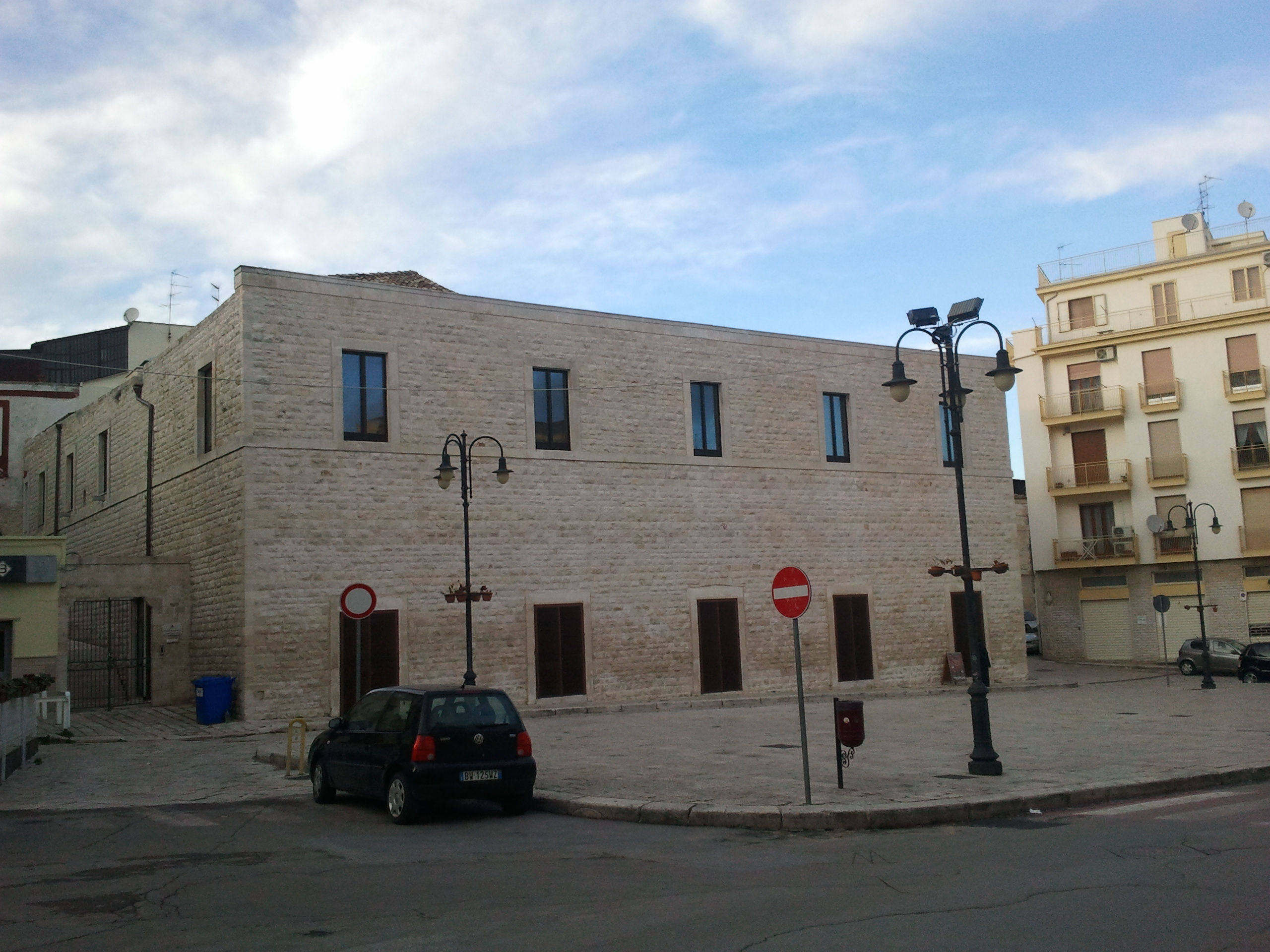
Marquis Palace

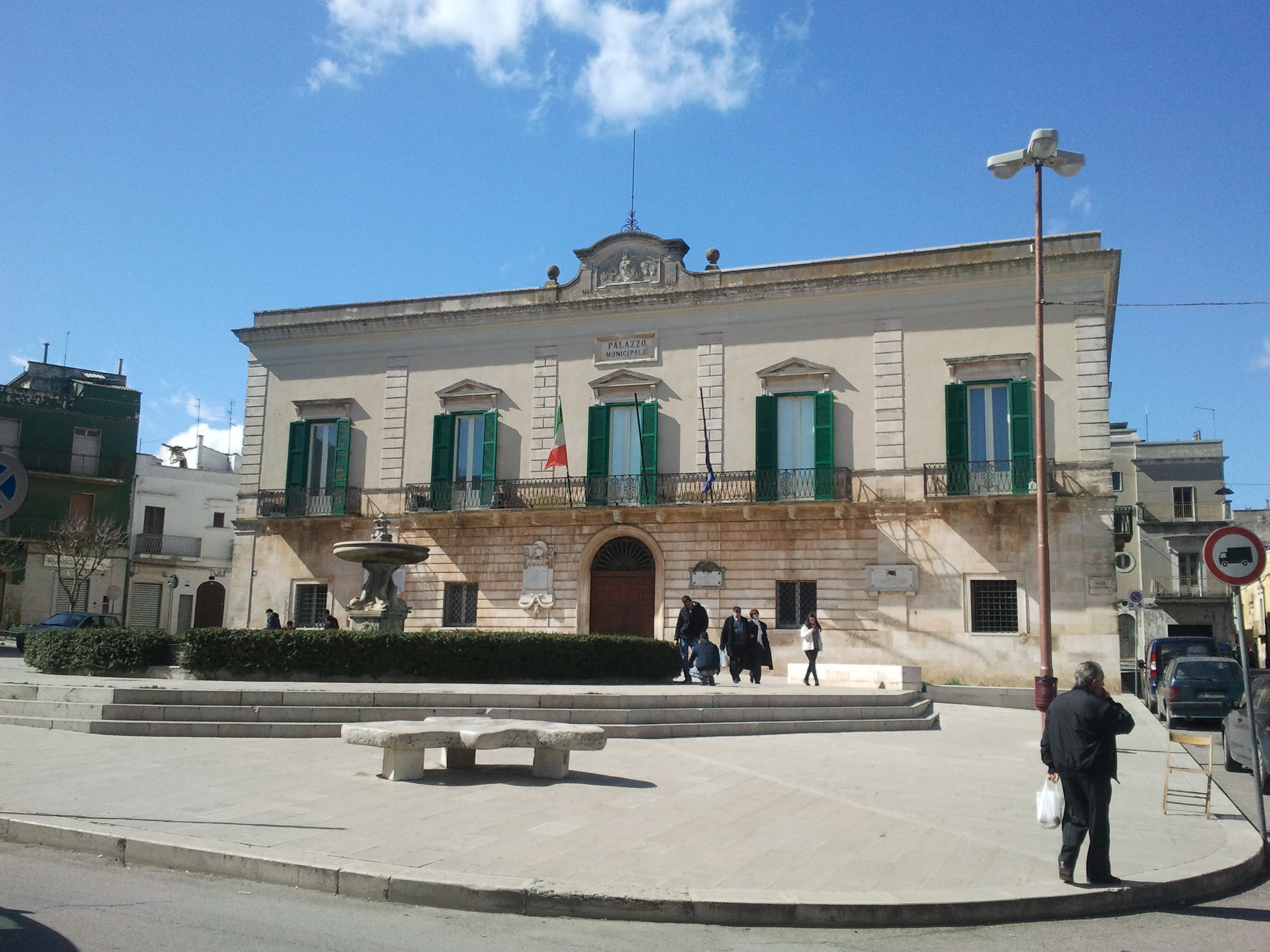
Municipal Palace

- Colonna Palace
- Palazzo Marchesale (1576)
- De Laurentis Palace
- De Luca Palace
- Di Fonzo Palace
- Di Santo Palace
- Giandomenico Palace
- Netti Palace
- Sava Palace
- Municipal Palace
- Castle Tangorra

=== Rupestrian architecture ===
- Sanctuary Rupestre e Grotte di Sant'Angelo (via Montefreddo)
- Rupestrian Sanctuary of Sant'Angelo in Morsara (via to Laterza)

=== Farms ===
- Masseria Viglione; Tratturo Melfi - Castellaneta (Strada statale per Matera in direzione Viglione, 40.711261°N 16.733545°E)
- Masseria Sava con annessa Cappella e "Neviera", nei pressi del confine con l’agro di Matera e prossima alla via Appia. (strada vicinale Alessandriello S.P. 160 in Contrada Sava/Iacoviello, 40.765675°N 16.690917°E )
- Masseria Galietti nel complesso rupestre è presenta la cappella dedicata a San Raffaele, bosco di conifere, oliveti e frutteti; La masseria è prossima al tratturo “ Tratturello Curtomartino”. (strada provinciale per Acquaviva S.P. 127 e strada comunale Lazazzera, 40.806272°N 16.782241°E)
- Stabilimento vitivinicolo Masseria De Laurentis (Strada statale per Matera, 40.747133°N 16.702805°E )
- Masseria Di Santo si trova nei pressi della valle fertile denominata Matine di Santeramo, prossima alla via Appia; la masseria è arricchita da una piccola chiesa dedicata a S. Bonifacio. (strada provinciale per Laterza S.P. 128, 40.733901°N 16.767631°E)
- Masseria De Laurentis, Jazzo De Laurentis (Strada statale per Matera, 40.749469°N 16.719835°E )
- Masseria Grottillo

==== Districts and rural roads ====
- Strada Appia (52)
- Strada per Trani (5)
- Strada la Croce (54)
- Strada Stazzaro (55)
- Strada Ciciretto (56)
- Strada Cirillo (14)
- Strada vicinale Pesto e Cirillo (15)
- Strade Guarallo (57)
- Strada Iazzitello (58)
- Strada Melone (59)
- Strada Vitone (61)
- Strade Tommaso Lella Iazzitello (68)
- Strada Vitone Difesa (72)
- Strada Fiascone (78)
- Strada Morsara (81)
- Strada Calzone (95)
- Strada Malannata (18)
- Strade Girasole (19)
- Strada Paritidde (21)
- Strada Lagolupino (22)
- Strada Spinelli (23)
- Strada S. Chiara (24)
- Strada Maria Peppa (25)
- Stradella (49)
- Stradella Casedde (51)
- Via Vecchia Altamura (55)

==== Tratturi and tratturelli ====
- Curtomartino
- Gravina - Matera
- Grumo Appula - Santeramo in Colle
- Santeramo in Colle - Laterza
- Tarantino

== Society ==
=== Demographic evolution ===
As the Istituto Nazionale di Statistica stated in 2012:

== Culture ==
=== Average ===
- Partecipare, periodico printed of local culture mensile
- Tele Radio Colle, emittente televisiva locale
- Il Colle, monthly paper journal

=== Cinema ===
In the countryside of Santeramo between 1930 and 1931 some scenes of the silent film Idillio Infranto, directed by Nello Mauri with Ida Mantovani and other amateur actors were shot.

In 1994 the town was chosen as the setting for Da do da (in dialetto barese: "Da qui a là"), directed by Nico Cirasola, a fantastic narration of the descent of the Olimpo in a town in southern Italy.

=== Cuisine ===
The typical Santermana cuisine is essentially based on local products: wheat, oil, wine, meats, cheeses, vegetables and fruit.

The production of significant quantities of cereals in the flat area of the Matine allows the production of products such as bread baked in a wood oven, biscuits, taralli, focaccia, friselle. The typical pasta is handmade with durum wheat semolina and takes the form of cavatelli, orecchiette, fricelli.

Typical dishes are orecchiette with fricelli, orecchiette with turnip tops, cavatelli with chops sauce, long cavatelli with cauliflower and fried breadcrumbs, cavatelli with cardoncelli mushrooms, white beans with chicory campestri, lamb on the spit with potatoes and onions, "gnumiredde" (rolls of lamb wrapped in the guts of the same animal), lampascioni boiled with oil and pepper. The consumption of horse meat (horse and donkey) is also widespread.

Among the typical sweets there are the marzipan castagnelle, the carteddate and the purciddi with the vincotto obtained from cooking figs, the Easter scarcedde with boiled eggs in the shape of doves, horses and handbags.

Of note is the production of wines, including Primitivo and Novello.

=== Events ===
- Patronal Festival of Sant'Erasmo is held in early June, with the solemn mass dedicated to the Patron, followed by the procession and the launch of balloons.The ride in typical ancient costumes takes place with ladies and knights followed by the triumphal chariot on which the holy image of the saint is placed. At the end of the evening a choreographic fireworks display closes the party.
- Ripa Prize for philanthropic activities was established by Decree by the President of the Republic over half a century ago. It awards scholarships given by the ancient Ripa family and is held annually in conjunction with the religious celebrations of the patron saint in early June.

== Economy ==
The surrounding area is characterized by the presence of numerous agro-zootechnical companies. The main agricultural activities concern the cultivation of wine grapes and olive trees. Santeramo is famous for sheep and cattle but above all horses, and is known throughout the area as the "City of horse meat".

Defined the "Switzerland of Italy" until a few years ago, due to the very low unemployment rate without source, Santeramo also boasts primacy of "World City of the Living Room", as the headquarters of Industry Natuzzi leader of upholstered furniture listed on the Wall Street stock exchange.

== Infrastructure and transports ==
=== Streets ===
Santeramo is the crossroads of many provincial and state roads; among the most important:

- SP 235 (già SS 171), leading on Gioia del Colle and Altamura;
- SP 236 (già SS 271) for Cassano delle Murge and Matera (named SP ex SS 271) - Viglione (SP 176)
- SP 127 Santeramo in Colle - Acquaviva delle Fonti;
- SP 128 Santeramo in Colle - Laterza.

=== Railways ===
The stazione di Santeramo, with reduced capacity since 2011 and closed from train service since 2016, has been at the service of the municipality and is located on the railway Rocchetta Sant'Antonio-Gioia del Colle managed by RFI. The entire railway section was replaced by a bus service, under the concession of Trenitalia.

=== Interurban mobility ===
The interurban transport of Santeramo in Colle is carried out with scheduled bus services managed by the companies Autolinee Caponio, Sita Sud and Stp Bari.

=== Urban mobility ===
The urban transport of Santeramo in Colle is carried out with scheduled bus services managed by the companies Autolinee Caponio.

== Administration ==
Below is a table relating to the successive administrations in this municipality.

Period		Office holder	Party	Title	Notes
Angelantonio Digregorio	4 agosto 1988	10 Novembere 1990	Partito Socialista Italiano	Sindaco	
Giuseppe Depascale	10 Novembere 1990	9 febbraio 1992	Partito Socialista Italiano	Sindaco	
Angelo Nuzzi	29 febbraio 1992	2 dicembre 1994	Democrazia Cristiana	Sindaco	
Gioacchino Vito Maiullari	14 dicembre 1994	24 aprile 1995	Partito Socialista Italiano	Sindaco	
Rosa Dimita	12 maggio 1995	4 giugno 1998	centro-sinistra	Sindaco	
Raffaele Ruberto	24 giugno 1998	14 dicembre 1998		Commissario straordinario	
Michele Di Gregorio	14 dicembre 1998	20 Novembere 2001	centro-destra	Sindaco	
Donato Cafagna	20 Novembere 2001	10 giugno 2002		Commissario prefettizio	
Vito Sante Zeverino	10 giugno 2002	29 maggio 2007	centro-sinistra	Sindaco	
Vito Lillo	29 maggio 2007	7 aprile 2011	centro-destra	Sindaco	
Giuseppe Marani	7 aprile 2011	31 maggio 2012		Commissario prefettizio	
Michele D'ambrosio	24 maggio 2012	30 marzo 2017	PD, PSI, SEL, IdV, UDC	Sindaco	
Emilia Felicita Capolongo	1 aprile 2017	25 giugno 2017		Commissario straordinario	
Fabrizio Baldassarre	25 giugno 2017	in carica	M5S	Sindaco	

== Twinnings ==
- (Germany) Bad Säckingen, dal 1983
- Bülach, Switzerland, since 2003
- (Italy) Formia (gemellaggio a carattere religioso)

== Sport ==
- The Football club Football Club Santeramo disputes the Seconda Categoria championships.
- Santermana A.S.C. at the turn of the 50s and 60s and the 80s it was the greatest expression of Santermana football.
- Rugby Union Santeramo is the main city rugby club that plays in Serie C1, plays its matches at the Casone Stadium. In the past, the Murgia Rugby franchise and the Santeramo Falcons also represented the city.
- The Santeramo Sport volleyball club, no longer active, was based in the municipality.
- Polisportiva Santeramo is a company that deals with badminton, tennis, Association football.
- Murgia Basket Santeramo is active in men's and women's basketball in Serie C and B respectively.

=== Sport facilities ===
The main sports facilities are:

- Municipal field "Giuseppe Casone"
- Municipal field "Vito Leonardo Mele" (abandoned)
- Sports Hall “Maresciallo Pasquale Vitulli”
- Palacooper (abandoned)

== Notes ==
=== Bibliography ===
- Lorenzo Musci, I colori di Santeramo, 2009
- Paolo Spinelli, La sommossa del 1860 a Santeramo in Colle ed il processo ai ribelli, 1966, Edizioni Del Liocorno
- Roberto Caprara, Il santuario di Sant'Angelo a Santeramo, 2008, Edizioni Adda
- Mons. Ignazio Fraccalvieri, L'icona del Giudizio Universale nella Grotta di S. Angelo presso Santeramo, 1975, Edizioni Adda
- Vito Tangorra, L'agro materano di Santeramo (Matine, Murge, Pedali), 1983, Edizioni Levante
- Vito Tangorra, La terra di S. Erasmo: dalle origini al sec. 18, 1969, Adriatica
- Fondazione Vito Tangorra, Francesco Netti: pittore e critico d'arte, 2008, Editore Santeramo Antica
- Vito Tangorra, Due chiese di Santeramo e un po' di storia, 1977, Grafica Safra
- Vito Tangorra, La popolazione di Santeramo tra il 600 e 700, 1980, Tipografia Meridionale
- Vito Tangorra, Risparmio e credito a Santeramo in Colle, 1977, Grafica Safra
- Clelia Grattagrisi, Le più antiche carte dell'archivio Caracciolo-Carafa di Santeramo: fondo Caracciolo di Santeramo, 1982, Società di storia patria per la Puglia
- Vincenzo Volpicella, Ragioni del sign. marchese di Santeramo contra la università, ed uomini di quella terra, 1806, Stamperia Orsiniana
- Rocco D'Ambrosio, Serafino Germinario. Un prete scomodo, 2007, Edizioni Palomar
- Michele Nuzzi, Personaggi di Santeramo, la mia terra ed io, 2018, Baldassarre Tipografi
- Franco Porfido, Santeramo in cammino, 2019, Baldassarre Tipografi
