= List of vegetable dishes =

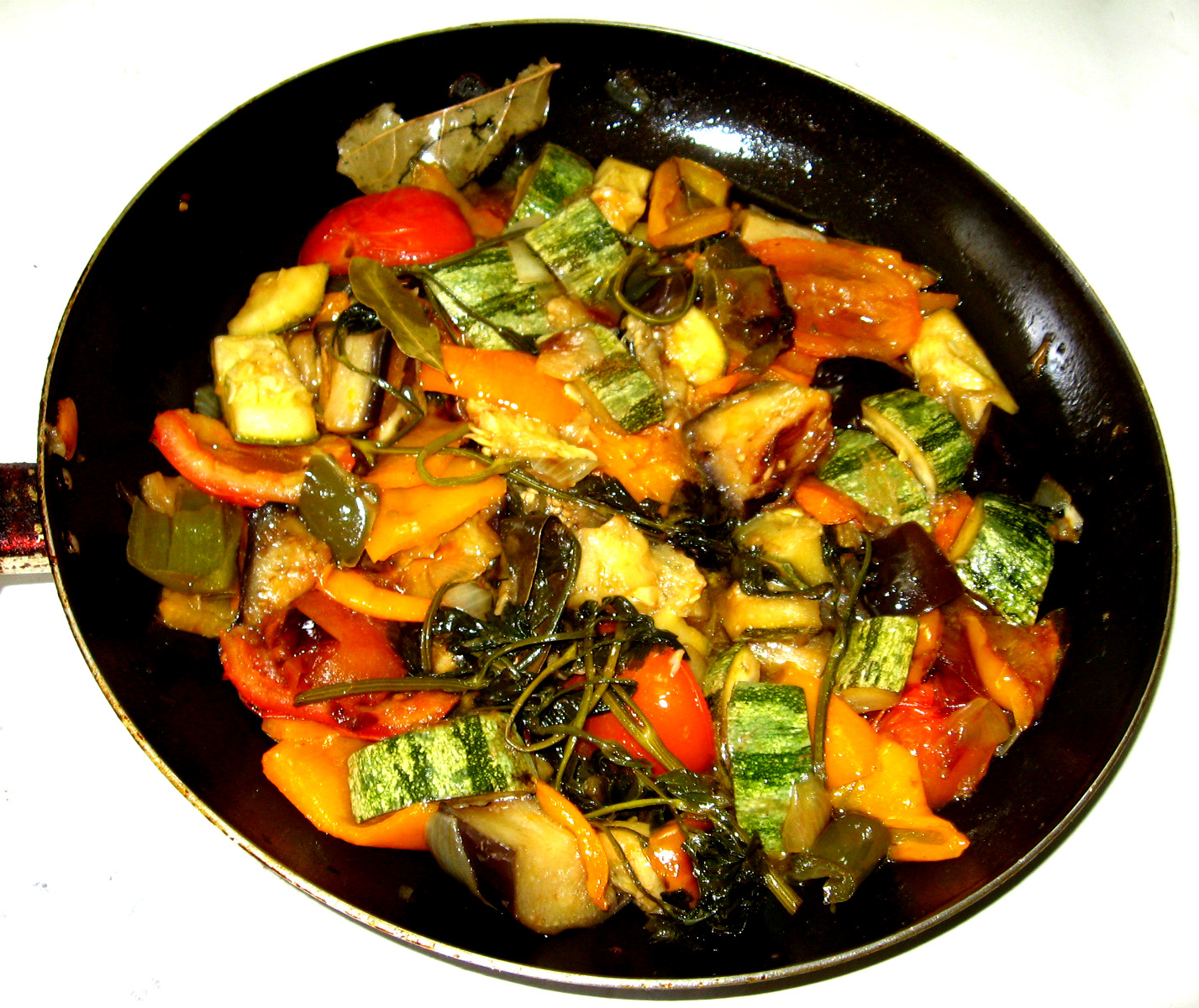
Ratatouille is a traditional French Provençal stewed vegetable dish that originated in Nice.

This is a list of vegetable dishes, including dishes in which the main ingredient, or one of the essential ingredients, is a vegetable.

In culinary terms, a vegetable is an edible plant or plant part intended for cooking or for consumption raw. Many vegetable-based dishes are found throughout the world.

== Vegetable dishes ==
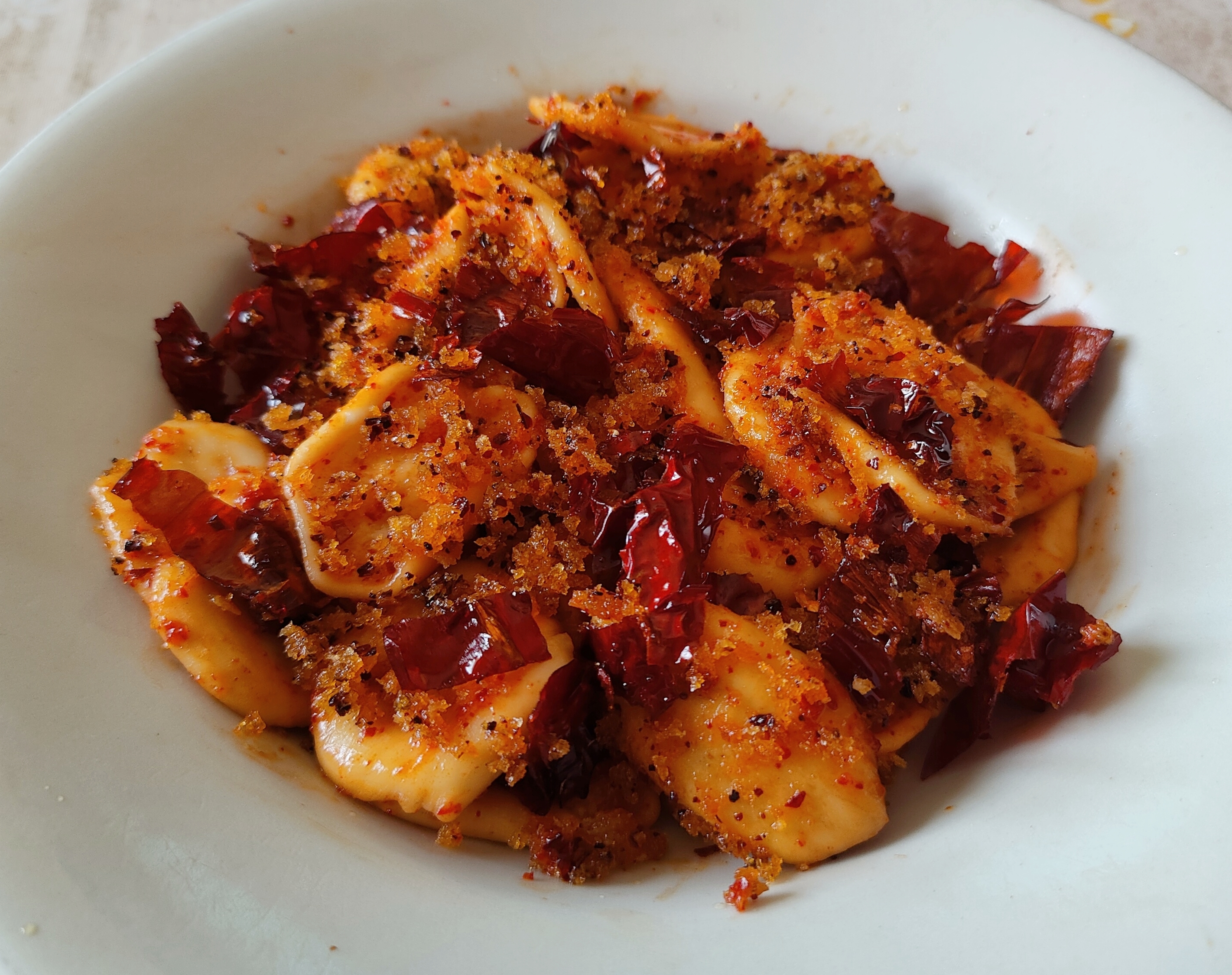
Pasta con i peperoni cruschi, an Italian pasta dish with dried peppers known as peperoni cruschi

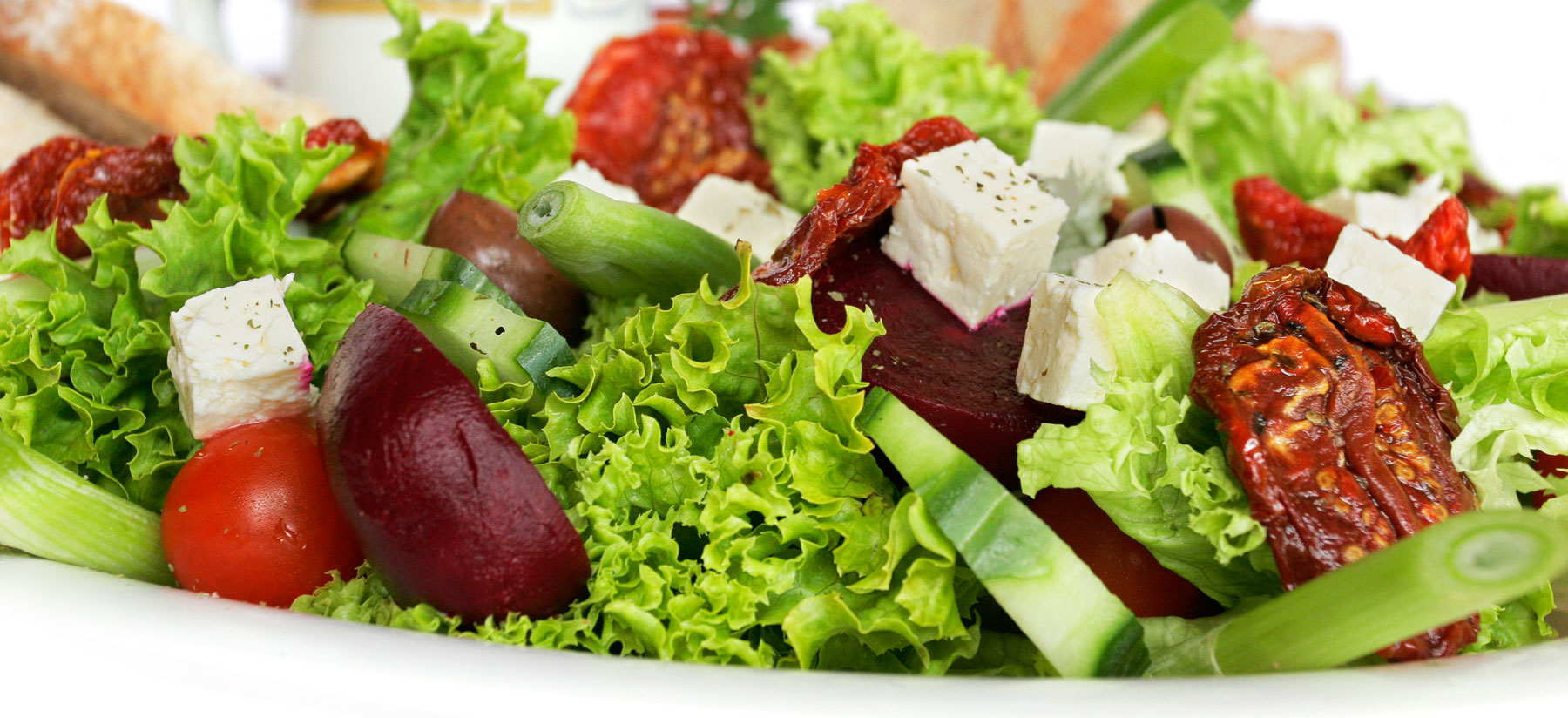
A garden salad with lettuce, sun-dried tomatoes, cherry tomatoes, beets, cucumber and feta cheese

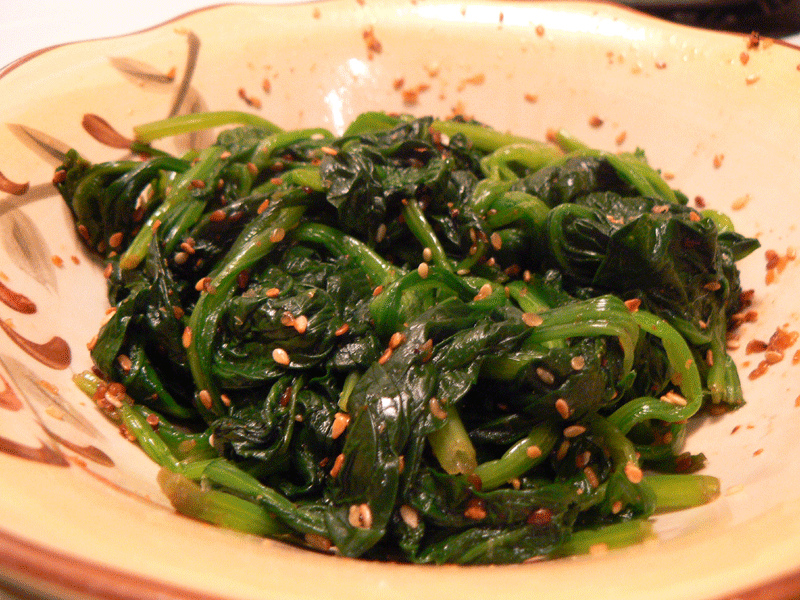
Goma-ae is a Japanese side dish. It is made with vegetables and sesame dressing.

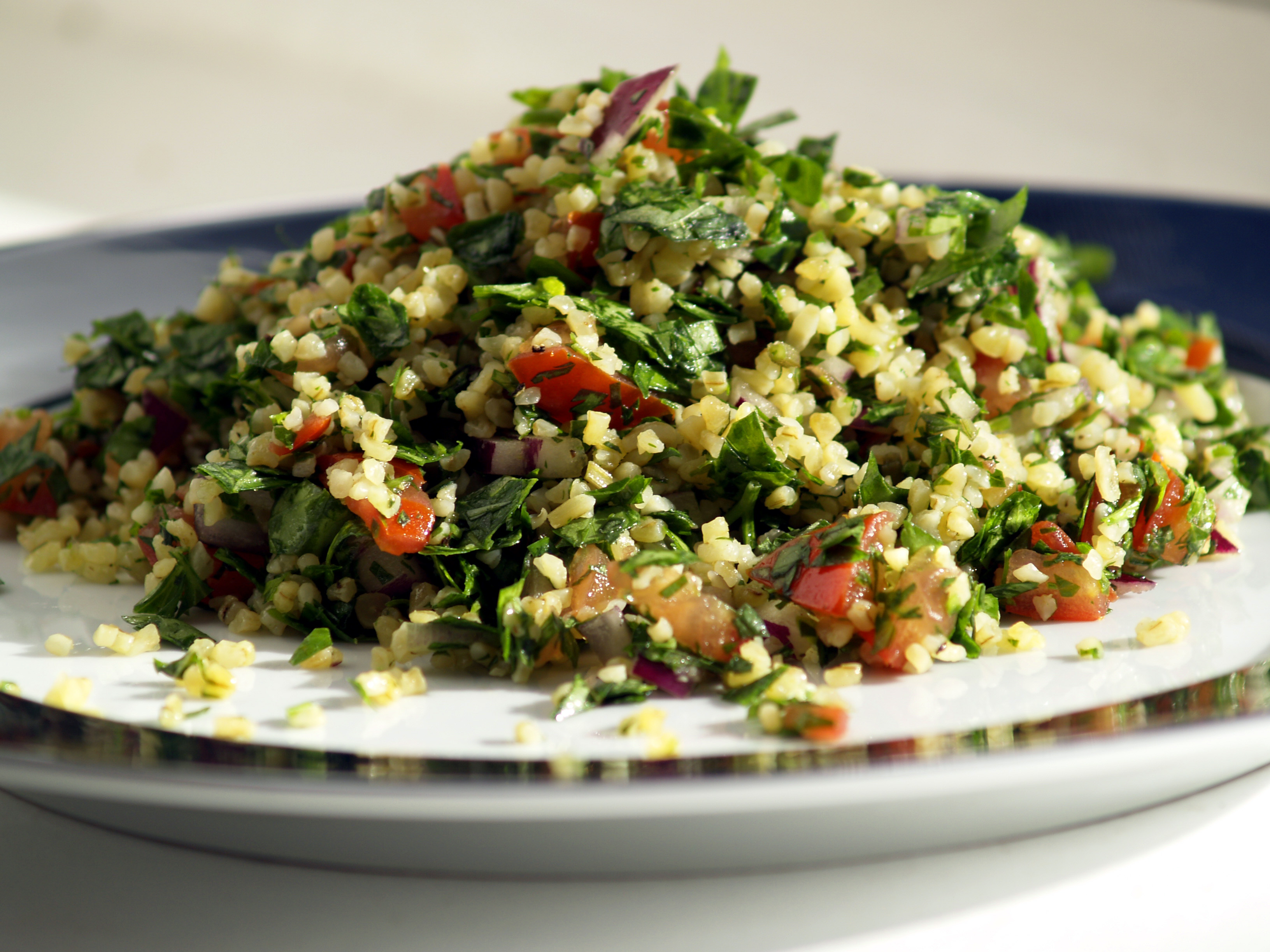
Tabbouleh is a Levantine vegetarian dish (sometimes considered a salad) traditionally made of bulgur, tomatoes, finely chopped parsley, mint, and onion, and seasoned with olive oil, lemon juice, and salt.

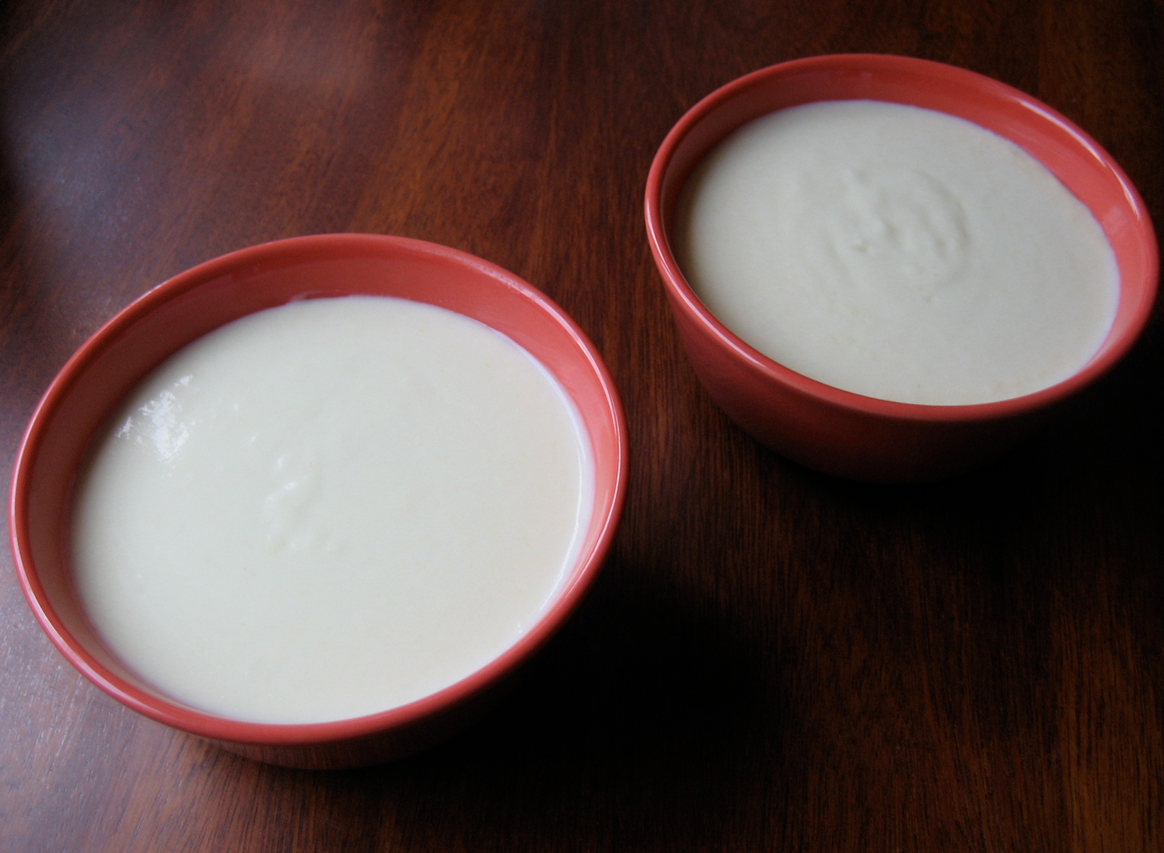
Vichyssoise is a thick soup made of puréed leeks, onions, potatoes, cream, and chicken stock.

- Ants on a log – Celery-based snack using raisins
- Ciambotta – Italian stew
- Chile relleno – Stuffed chili pepper dish in Mexican cuisine
- Collard liquor – Liquid remaining after boiling greens
- Confit byaldi – Variation of ratatouille
- Crudités – French appetizer consisting of raw vegetables
- Ema datshi – Cheese and chili-based dish from Bhutan
- Főzelék – Type of Hungarian stew or soup
- Fried cauliflower – Widespread dish in Europe, Middle East, and Asia
- Ghormeh sabzi – Iranian herb stew
- Goma-ae – Japanese vegetable dish
- Green bean casserole – American dish from the 1950s
- Guacamole – Mexican avocado-based dish
- Jalapeño popper – Breaded, fried, stuffed jalapeño pepper
- Kimchi – Korean side dish of fermented vegetables
- Kuluban – Indonesian traditional salad dish
- Lecsó – Hungarian dish
- Lettuce sandwich – Type of sandwich wrap
- Mashed pumpkin – Dish made of mashed or puréed pumpkin
- Mish-mash – Bulgarian vegetable dish
- Onion ring – Deep-fried battered onion slices
- Pao cai – Pickle in Chinese, and particularly Sichuan cuisine
- Pasta con i peperoni cruschi – Pasta dish from Basilicata, Italy
- Pasta primavera – American pasta dish
- Pickled cucumber – Small pickled and fermented cucumber
- Pico de gallo – Mexican condiment
- Piperade – Basque vegetable dish
- Plecing kangkung – Indonesian spicy water spinach dish
- Ratatouille – French stewed vegetable dish
- Sambar – Lentil stew
- Sauerkraut – Finely sliced and fermented cabbage
- Stuffed peppers – Dish involving filling the cavities of a bell pepper with other food
- Stuffed zucchini – Dish common in Egypt and the former Ottoman domain
- Succotash – Traditional American food
- Sweet potato pie – Traditional dessert in the southern United States
- Sweet sour and spicy vegetable gravy – Tibetan soup-like vegetable curry
- Turnip cake – Dim sum dish
- Vegetable chips – Thin bite-sized snack food made from vegetables
- Vegetable sandwich – Type of sandwich
- Vegetable soup – Type of soup containing vegetables
- Vegetable stew – Dish of ingredients cooked in liquid

== By main ingredient ==
=== Eggplant (aubergine) dishes ===
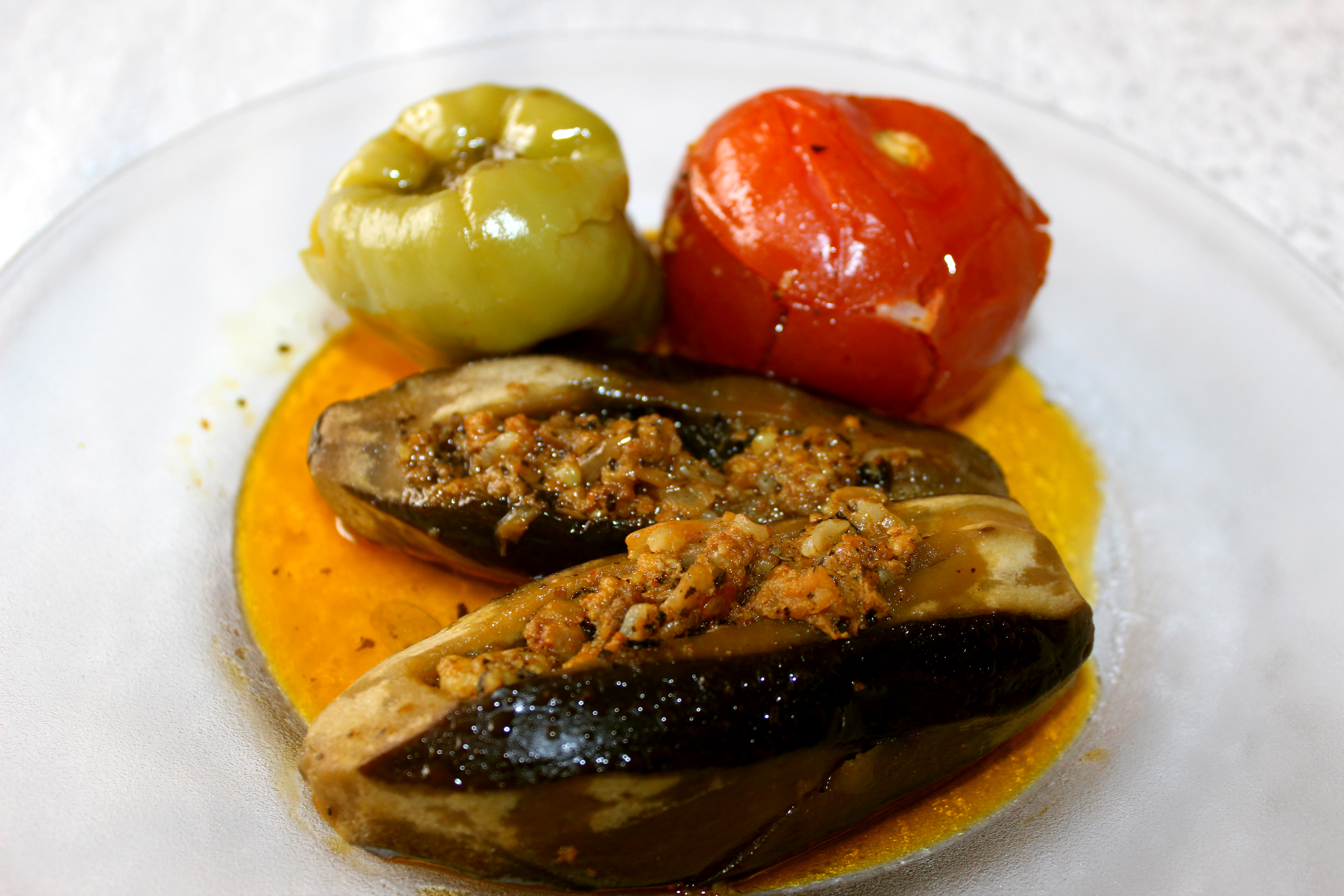
Stuffed eggplant

- Baba ghanoush – Levantine dish of cooked eggplant
- Caponata – Sicilian eggplant dish
- Fried eggplant – Eggplant dish
- Moussaka – Dish of layered vegetables, sauce and meat
- Parmigiana – Italian dish of eggplant with cheese and tomato sauce
- Stuffed eggplant – Eggplant dish

=== Legume dishes ===
- Baked beans – Cooked beans in a seasoned sauce
- Bean salad – Common cold salad composed of various cooked or pickled beans
- Dal – Dried, split pulses used for cooking
- Edamame – Immature soybean pod used as a specialty food
- Falafel – Middle Eastern fried bean dish
- Green bean casserole – American dish from the 1950s
- Hummus – Middle Eastern chickpea puree dish
- Pea soup – Soup made from dried peas
- Refried beans – Mexican dish of cooked mashed beans
- Vegetarian chili

=== Potato dishes ===
- Baked potato – Potato dish
- French fries – Deep-fried strips of potato
- Knödel – Large round poached or boiled potato or bread dumplings, made without yeast
- Mashed potato – Potato dish
- Patatas bravas – Spanish potato dish
- Potato chip – Thinly sliced potatoes, deep-fried or baked
- Potato doughnut – Sweet, potato-based treat
- Potato pancake – Shallow-fried pancakes of grated or ground potato
- Potato salad – Salad made from boiled potatoes
- Rösti – Swiss potato dish
- Samosa – Deep-fried pastry snack
- Spanish omelette – Traditional dish of egg and potato

== By type ==
=== Salads ===
- Caprese – Italian salad
- Chef's salad – American salad
- Coleslaw – Salad consisting primarily of finely-shredded raw cabbage
- Greek salad – Salad of tomatoes, cucumbers, and feta
- Israeli salad – Vegetable salad made in Israel
- Pecel – Indonesian vegetable dish
- Potato salad – Salad made from boiled potatoes
- Salade niçoise – French salad with anchovies or tuna
- Tabbouleh – Levantine dish of parsley and bulgur

=== Soups ===
- Borscht – Eastern European sour soup
- Corn chowder – Creamy corn soup from the United States
- French onion soup – Soup of onions and stock
- Gazpacho – Spanish cold soup dish
- Kesäkeitto – Finnish traditional soup
- Minestrone – Thick soup of Italian origin
- Spinach soup – Soup prepared using spinach
- Tomato soup – Soup made with tomatoes
- Vichyssoise – Type of soup

== By country ==
=== Indian vegetable dishes ===
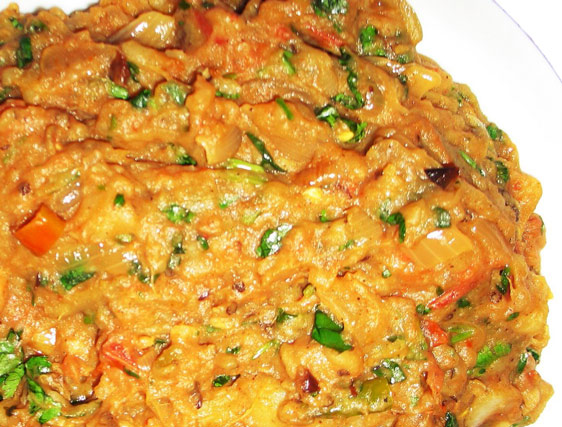
Eggplant and tomato bhurta

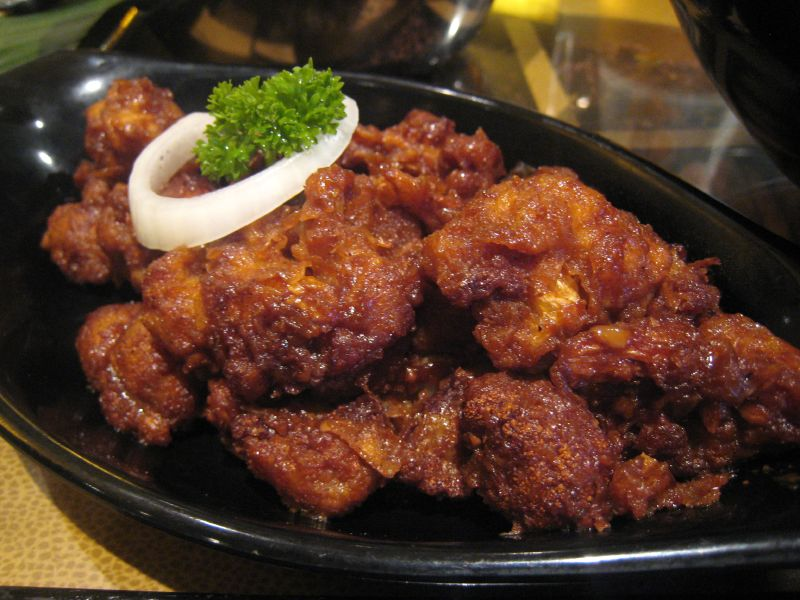
Gobi manchurian is an Indian Chinese fried cauliflower food item commonly eaten in India.

- Aloo gobi – Curry dish with cauliflower and potatoes
- Aavakaaya – Variety of pickles prepared using mango
- Bharvan mirch – Dish involving filling the cavities of a bell pepper with other food
- Bhurta – Fried mixture of mashed vegetables
- Dal – Dried, split pulses used for cooking
- Gobi manchurian – Deep-fried savory dish in Indo-Chinese cuisine
- Kosambari – Seasoned split pulses salad
- Mattar paneer – Indian cheese and peas dish
- Pakora – Spiced fritter originally from the Indian subcontinent
- Poriyal – Tamil stir-fry
- Sambar (dish) – Lentil stew
- Sarson da saag – South Asian dish
- Tamate ka kut – Indian tomato dish
- Theeyal – South Indian roasted coconut stew
- Thoran – Indian vegetable dish
- Undhiyu – Gujarati vegetable dish

=== Pakistani vegetable dishes ===
- Aloo gobi – Curry dish with cauliflower and potatoes
- Baingan – Plant species
- Bhindi – Species of edible plant
- Saag – Leafy vegetable dish from the Indian subcontinent

== See also ==
- List of foods
- List of salads
- List of squash and pumpkin dishes
- List of vegetables
- Vegetarian cuisine
- Veggie burger
