= Bhurta or Vorta =

Fried mixture of mashed vegetables

Bharta
- Different types of bharta
- Type: savory
- Region or state: Indian subcontinent
- Serving temperature: served with rice or ruti
- Main ingredients: mustard oil, onions and chillies with bharta elements
- Variations: Aloo bhorta, baigan bharta, tamatar bharta, shutkir varta, narikel shutkir vorta

Bhurta, vorta, bhorta, borta, bharta or chokha is a mixture of mashed vegetables in Desi cuisine.

Some variations of this dish are baingan bhurta and aloo bhurta.

== Etymology ==
The word bhurta is derived from the Sanskrit roots bhṛj (भृज्) and bhṛkta (भृक्त) which mean something which is roasted or fried. Thus bhurta refers to a spicy mash made from roasted, boiled or fried vegetables.

It is known by different names in South Asia itself, as in;

- Kashmiri- ژؠٹِن (tsetin)
- Hindi- भुरता (bhurtā)
- Rajasthani- बुज्जी/बांटण (bujji/bā̃ṭaṇ)
- Punjabi- ਭੜਥਾ (bhaṛthā)
- Nepali- भरता (bhartā)
- Gujarati- ઓળો (oḷo)
- Marathi- भरीत (bharīt)
- Bhojpuri- चोखा (chokhā)
- Maithili- সন্না (sannā)
- Bengali- মাখা/ভর্তা (mākhā/bhôrtā)
- Assamese- পিটিকা (pitikā)
- Odia- ଚକଟା (chakaṭā)
- Meitei- ꯑꯃꯦꯇꯄꯤ (ametpi)
- Kannada- ಗೊಜ್ಜು (gōjju)
- Tamil- துவயல் (tuvayal)
- Tulu- ಗೊಜ್ಜಿ (gōjji)
- Telugu- పచ్ఛడి (pachchaḍi)
- Malayalam- ചമ്മന്തി (chammanti)

== Ingredients ==
Bhurta recipes vary depending on the region and the vegetable(s) used. In general, the ingredients are as follows:

- A vegetable, such as aloo (potato), baingan (eggplant), or karela (bitter melon)
- Tamatar (tomato) or pyaz (onion)
- Chaunk (tempered spices)

== Gallery ==
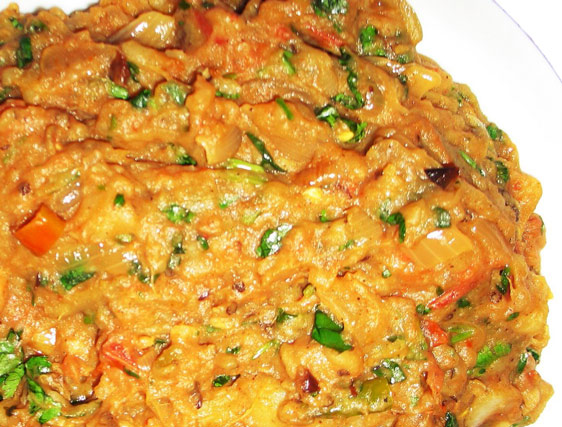
Baingan bartha, an eggplant and tomato bhurta

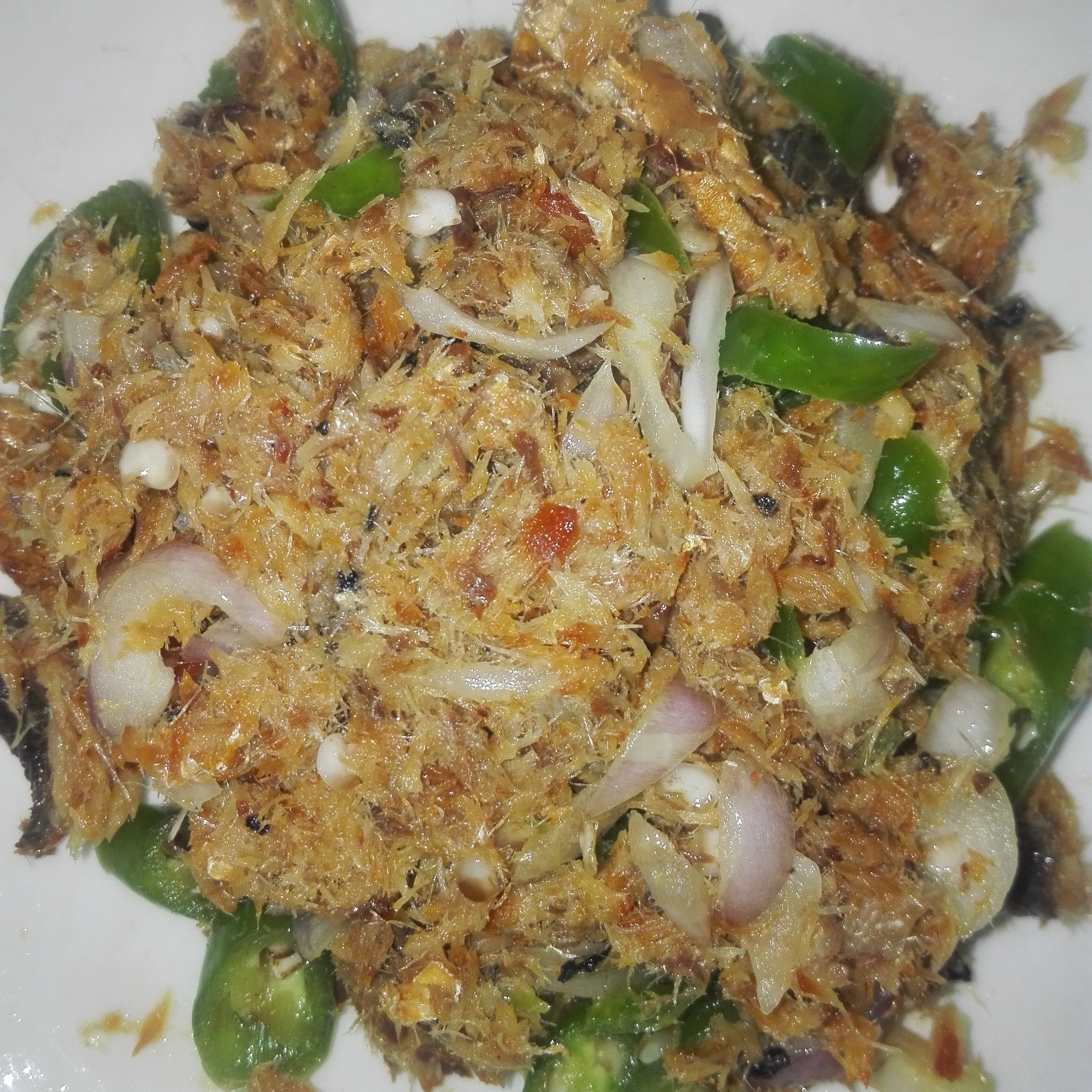
Salted ilish vorta

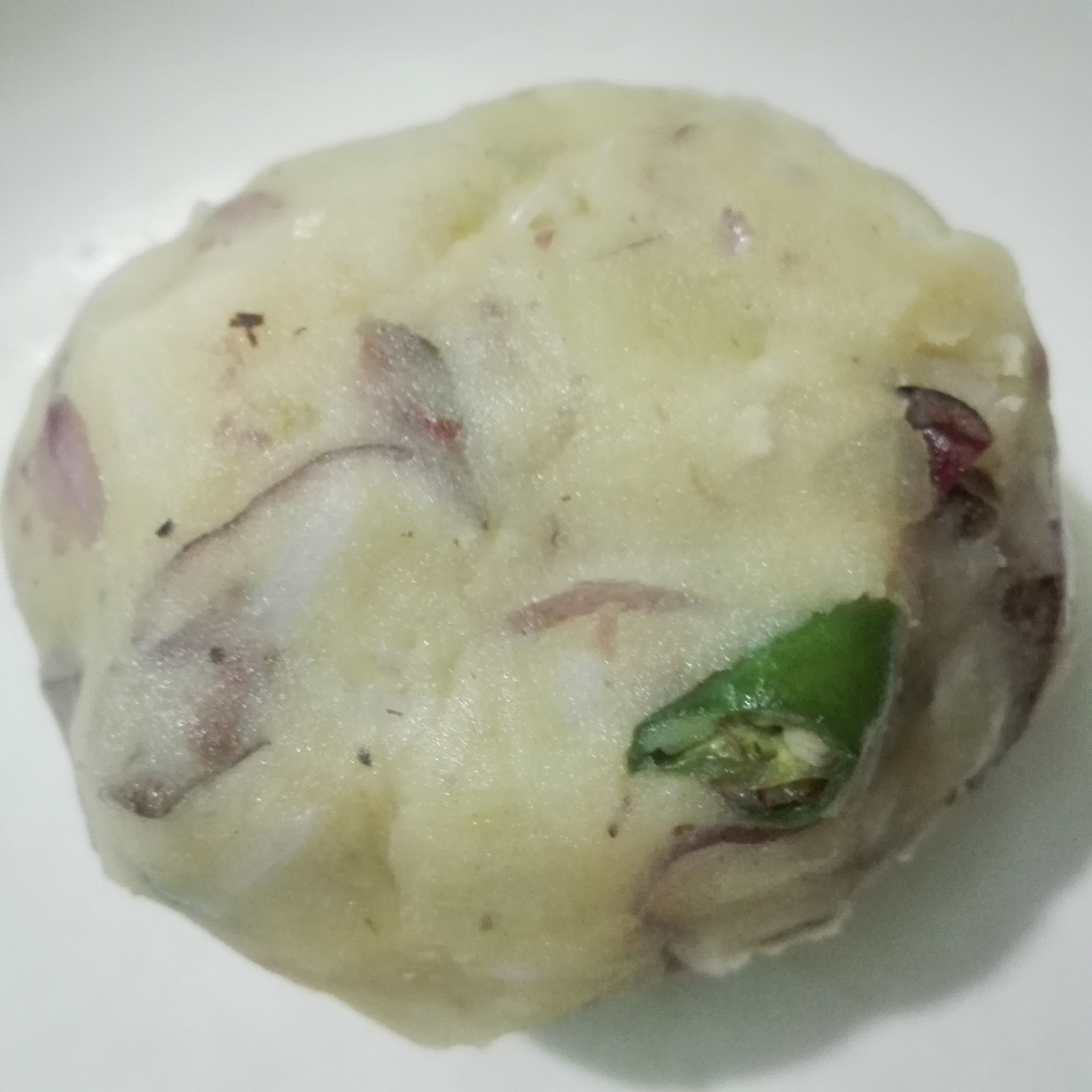
Aloo bharta (mashed potato bhurta)

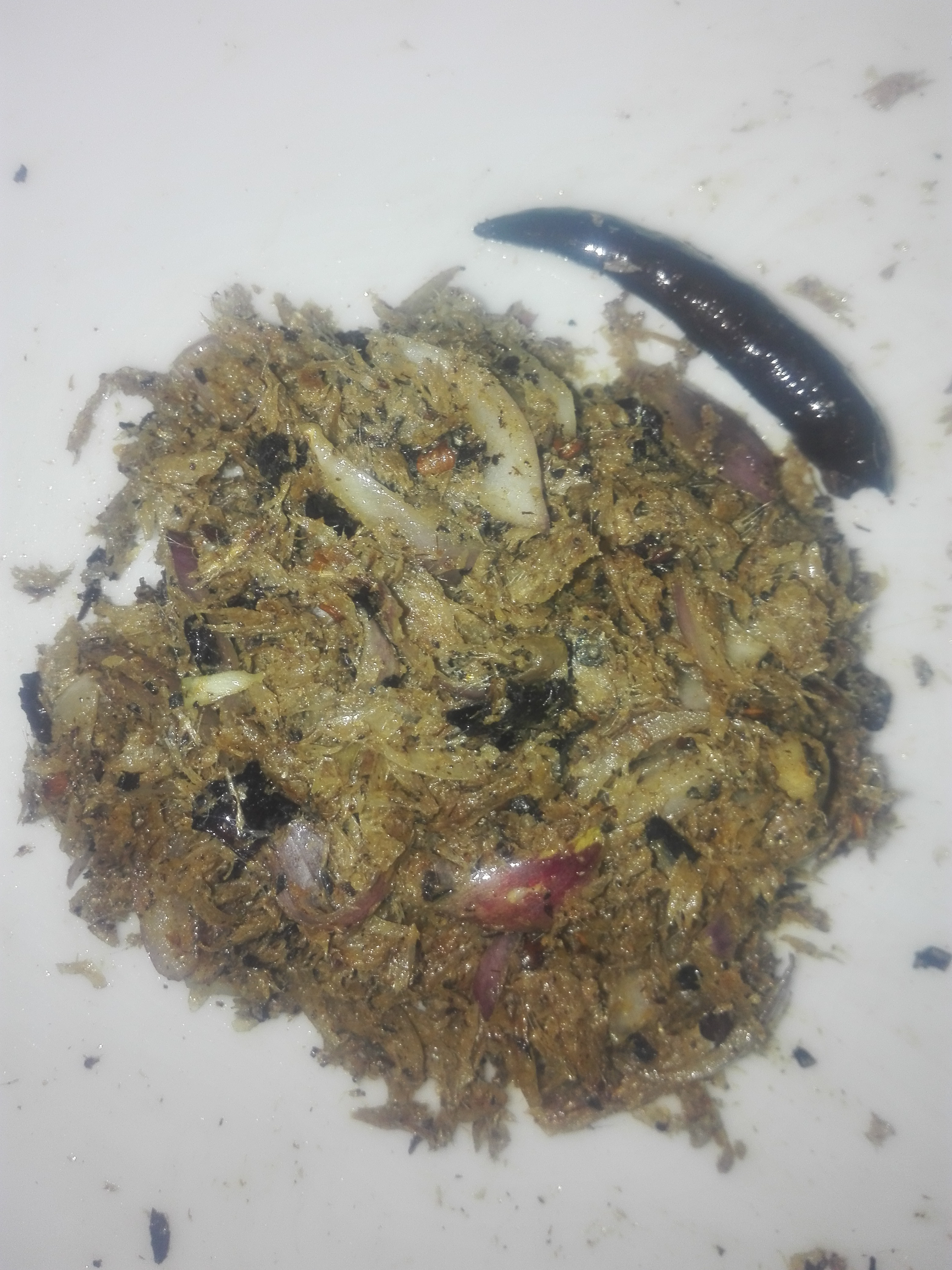
Dry fish cottage

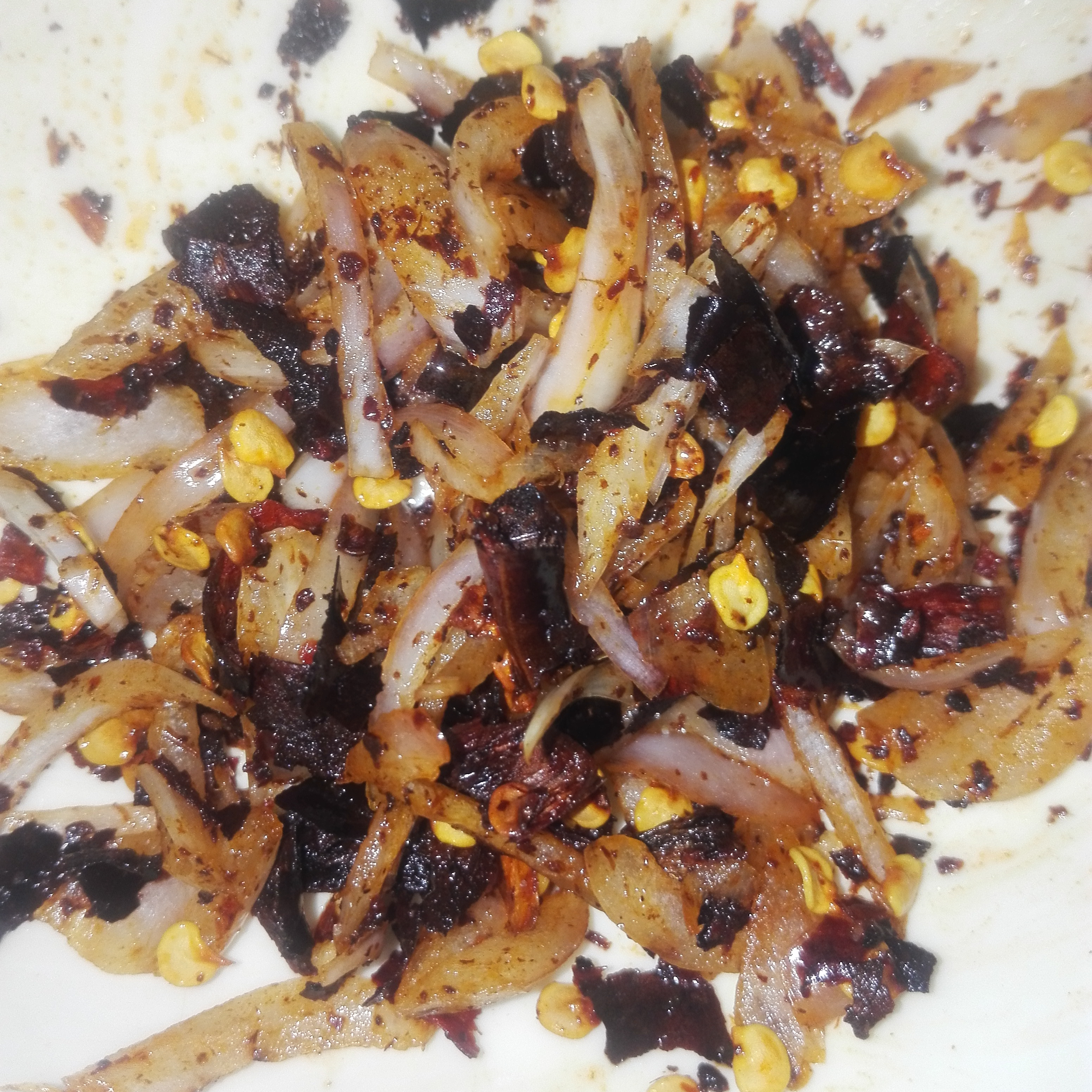
Red pepper vorta

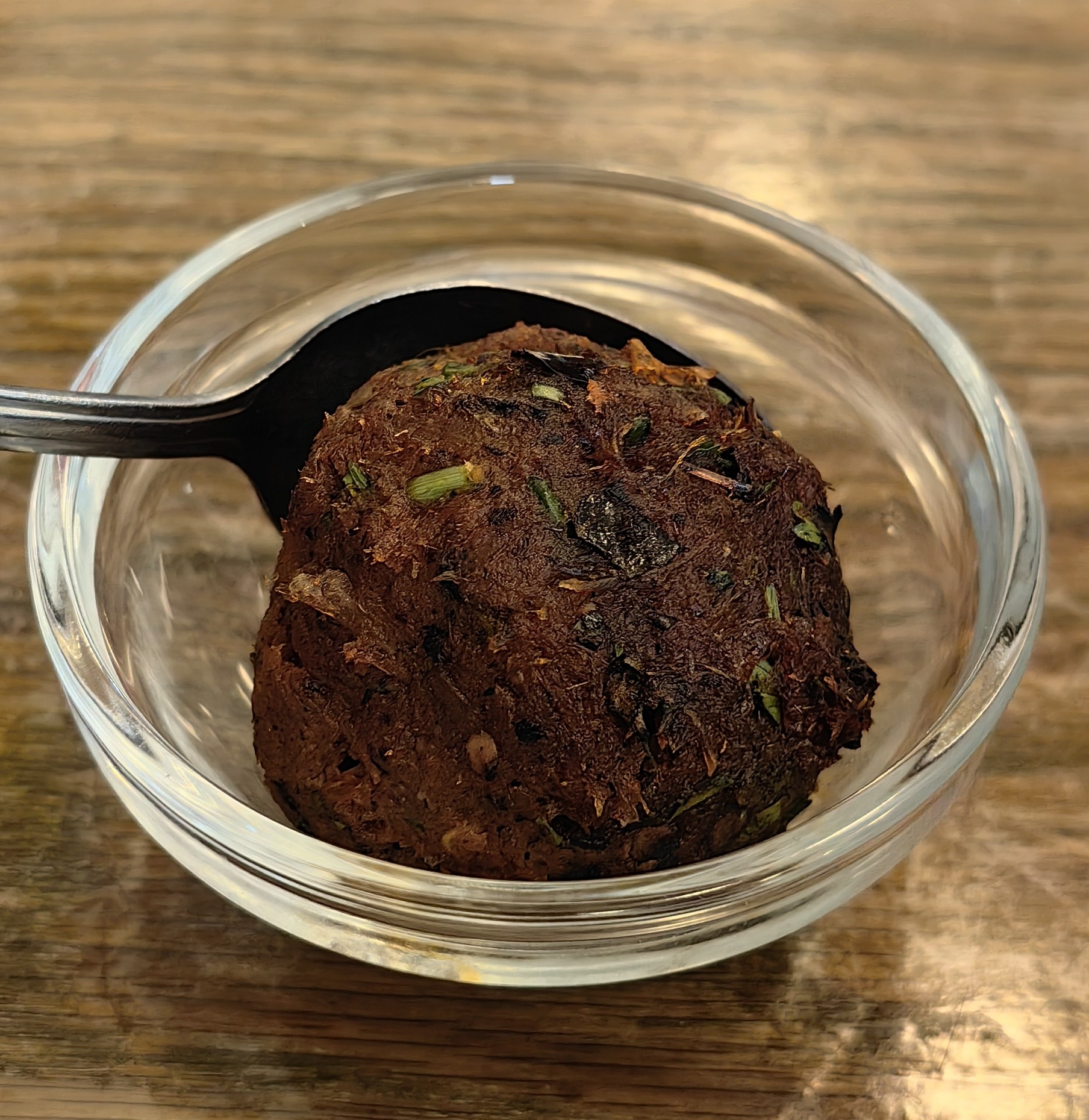
Bangladeshi Fish Borta

== See also ==
- Cuisine of the Indian subcontinent
- List of vegetable dishes
