= Pasta con i peperoni cruschi =

Pasta dish from Basilicata, Italy

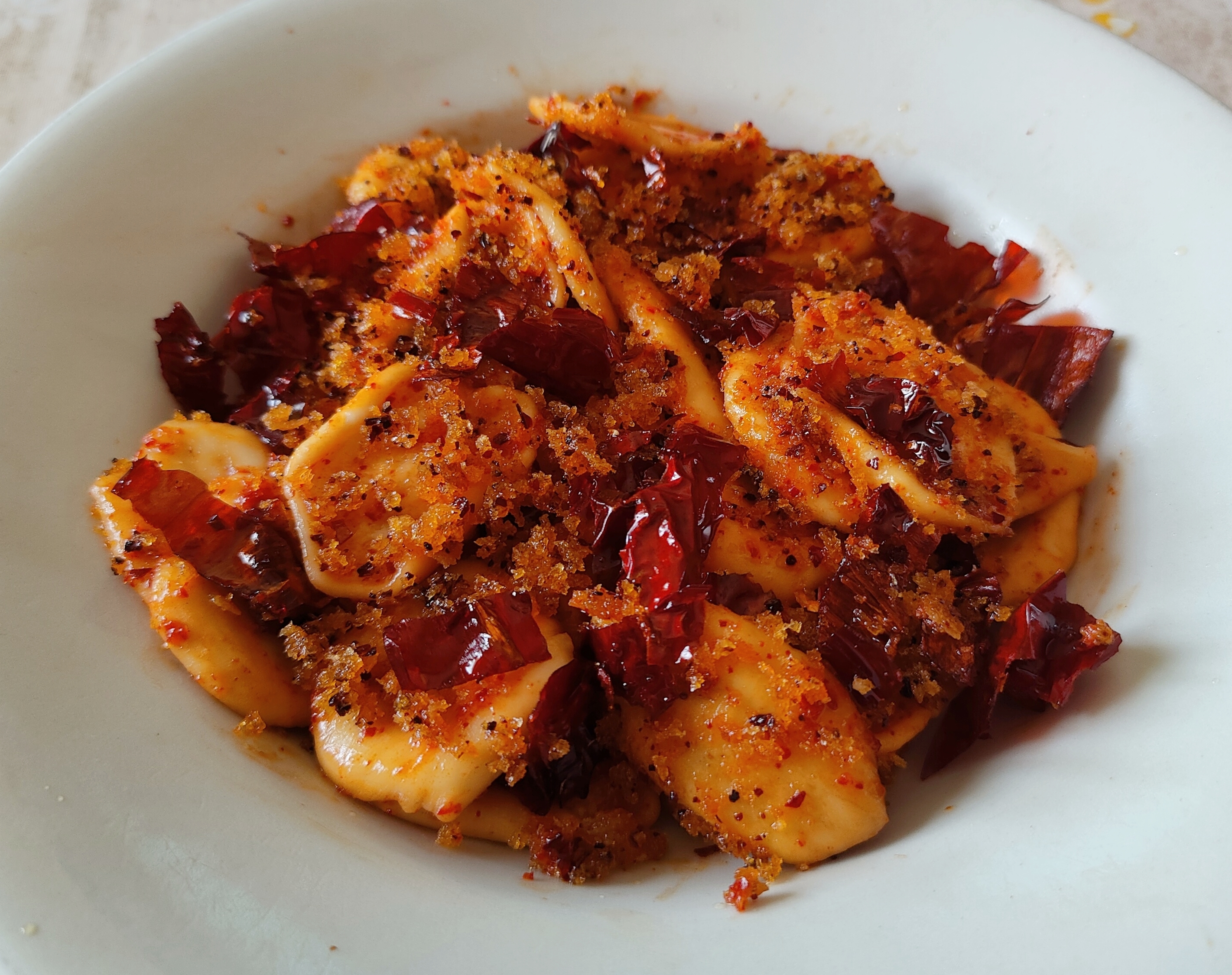
- Strascinati pasta with peperoni cruschi and breadcrumbs
- Course: Primo (Italian course)
- Place of origin: Italy
- Region or state: Basilicata
- Main ingredients: Pasta, peperone crusco, breadcrumbs

Pasta con i peperoni cruschi is a pasta dish flavoured with peperoni cruschi, typical of the Basilicata region of Italy.

== Description ==
The main ingredient is peperone crusco, a dried and crunchy pepper known for its sweet flavour and intense colour, which is a popular element in the local cuisine. Usually the peperone di Senise is used, for its thin pulp and low water content which allows a rapid drying.

It is served with homemade pasta, such as cavatelli, strascinati or ferretti (also known as frizzuli).

== Preparation ==
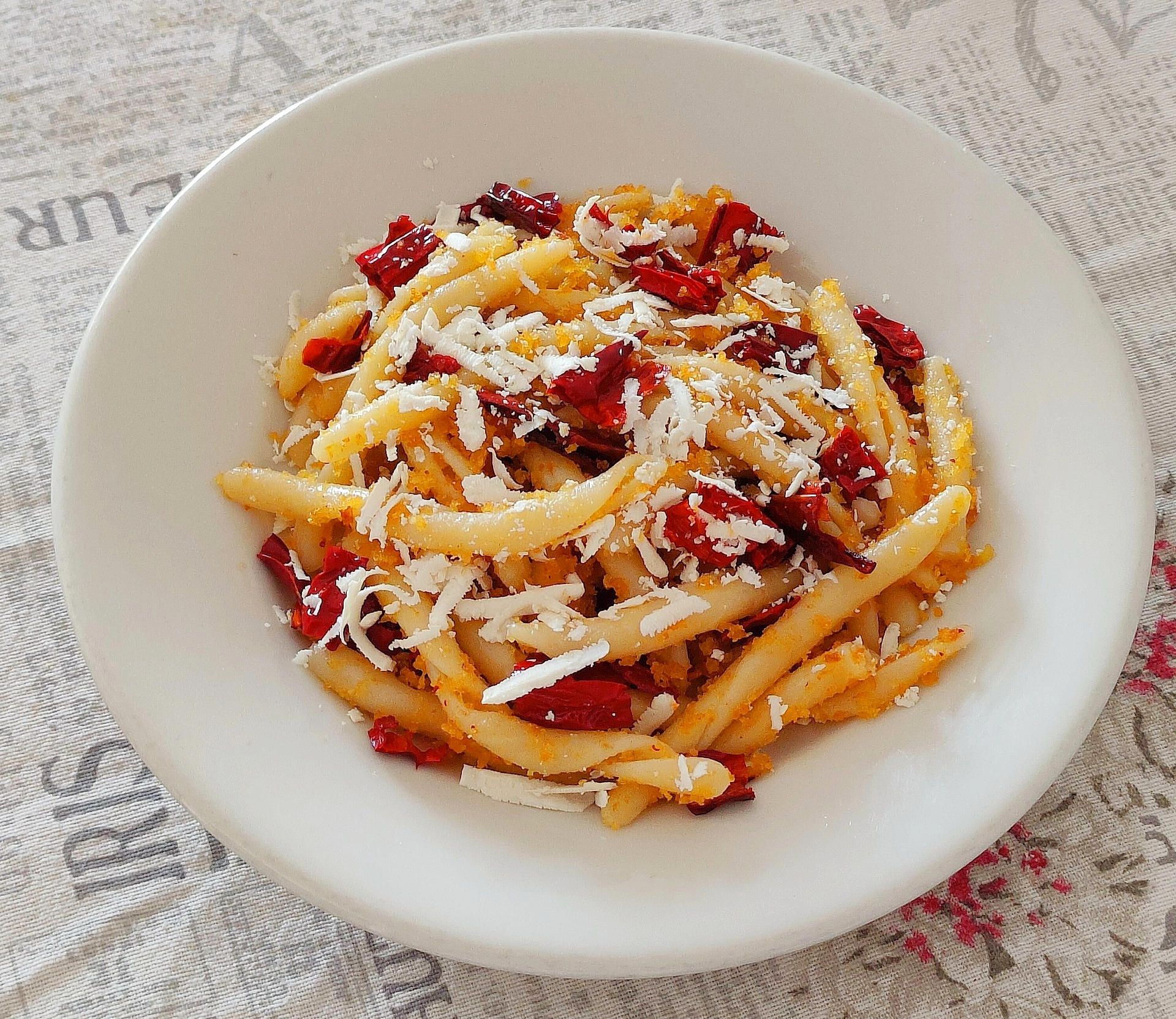
Frizzuli pasta with peperoni cruschi, breadcrumbs, and cacioricotta cheese

The peppers are cleaned with a dry cloth, deprived of the stalk and the seeds to be subsequently flash-fried in hot olive oil, flavoured with a garlic clove which is removed before the cooking. The frying takes just a few seconds, and they must be immediately extracted to avoid burns that compromise the flavour, giving an unpleasant taste.

== See also ==
Media related to Pasta con i peperoni cruschi at Wikimedia Commons

- Cuisine of Basilicata
- List of pasta
- List of pasta dishes
