= Goma-ae =

Japanese vegetable dish

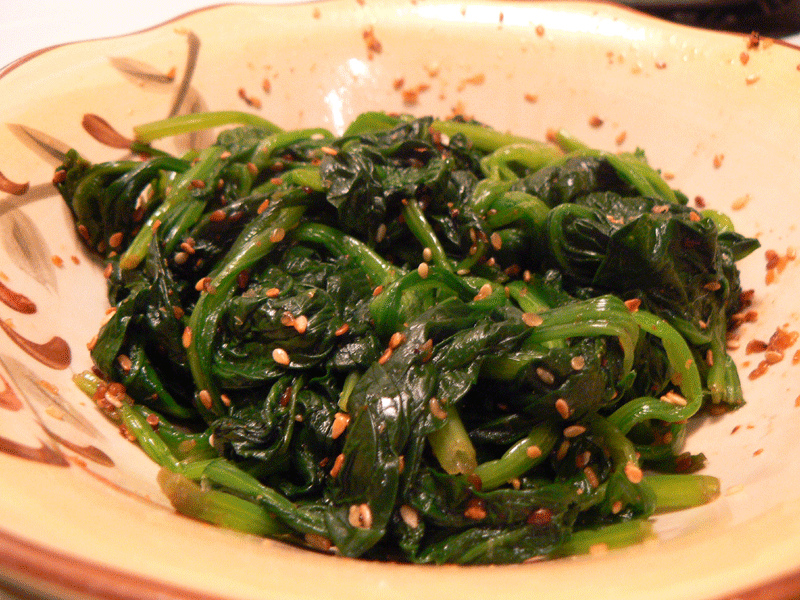
Goma-ae with spinach

Goma-ae (胡麻和え), sometimes also spelled Gomaae or Gomae is a Japanese side dish. It is made with vegetables and sesame dressing (goma meaning sesame and ae meaning sauce in Japanese). One of the most common versions, often found at Japanese restaurants in the West, is served in the form of a spinach salad, mixed with sesame sake sauce or miso paste and topped with sesame. Often sugar and soy sauce are also used. Other versions feature green beans or other vegetables.

== See also ==
- List of salads
- List of vegetable dishes
- Namul, the Korean equivalent
