= Peperone di Senise =

Sweet pepper from Basilicata, Italy

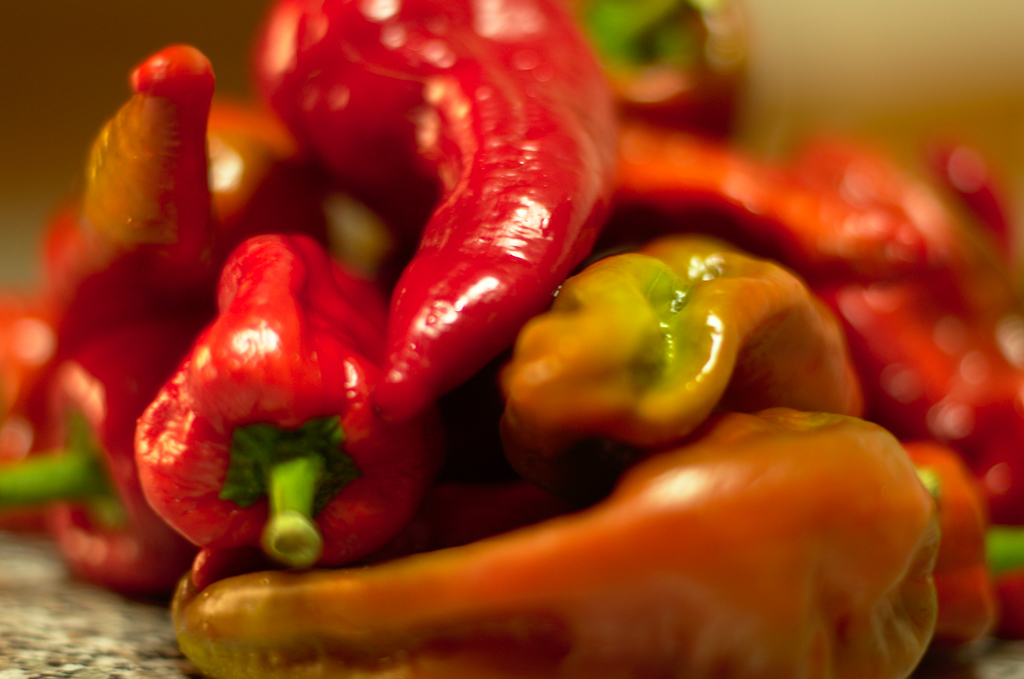
- Place of origin: Italy
- Region or state: Senise, Basilicata

Peperone di Senise (lit. 'bell pepper of Senise') is a variety of bell pepper typical of the village of Senise.

It is a cultivar of Capsicum annuum sweet, with thin pericarp and low water content. Since 1996, Senise bell pepper is recognized as a fruit and vegetable product with a protected geographical indication (PGI).

== Characteristics ==
It presents a pointed, hooked or truncated shape, depending on the type. It has a sweet taste and a color that varies from green to purple red, and is characterized by the size and thin pulp (1.5 to 2.2 mm). The peduncle is well welded to the berry, such as not to detach even after drying. The dry product must be presented in necklaces (called "serte") of variable length from 1.5 to 2 m. It is marketed fresh, dry and powdered.

The production area includes the areas bordering the municipality of Senise which overlook the Sinni and Agri valleys. Since the bell pepper arrived in Italy, between 1500 and 1600, farmers from Senise selected a variety that, with the passing of time, will become one of the most valuable at national level. At the beginning, this solanaceous plant grew and developed in an agricultural panorama mainly characterized by self consumption, and later it became a more and more specialized crop and therefore capable of guaranteeing an income.

The most popular use of Senise peppers is to be dried, turning into a crunchy bell pepper known as crusco, an essential element of Lucanian cooking. Drying of Senise peppers is done according to natural local methods by indirect exposure to sun rays in long sheets hung in sunny and aerated places. A final rapid passage in the oven eliminates any residual humidity and facilitates the eventual subsequent milling in order to obtain a spice known in jargon as zafaran p'sat, as it resembles, for color and structure, the classic saffron.

== Area of production ==
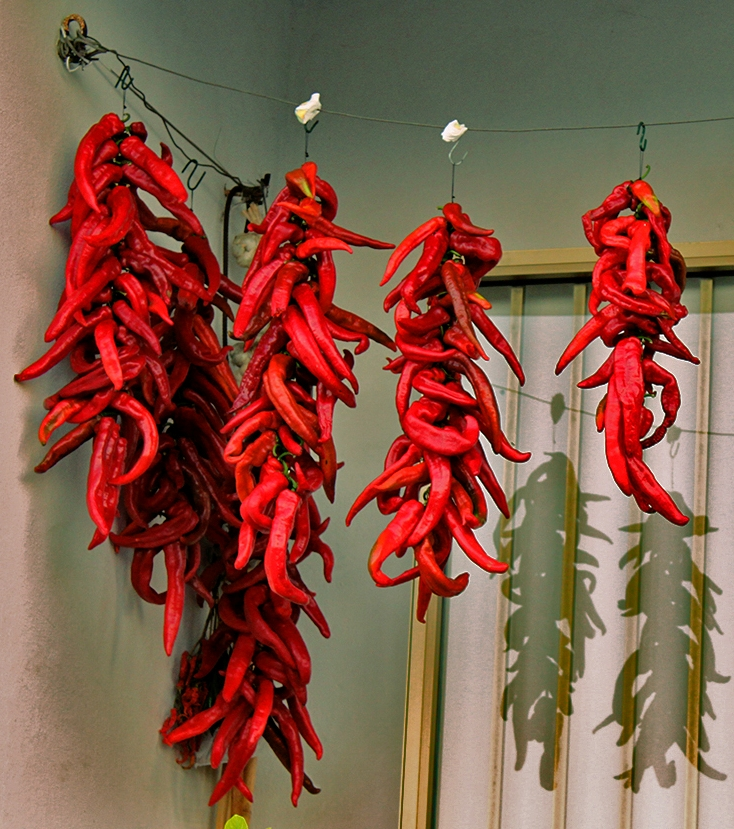
Senise peppers exposed in the open air, during drying phase

The production falls in the municipality of Senise and in other neighboring municipalities of the provinces of Potenza and Matera. In order to obtain the denomination of "peperoni di Senise" it is necessary that they are produced in one of the following areas:

- In Senise, the territory is identified with the areas served by the irrigation systems of the "Alta Val d'Agri" reclamation consortium (floodplain areas of recovery on the right and left bank of the Sinni River plant Sicileo, Visciglio, Massanova, Piano delle maniche, Codicino, Piano delle Rose), as well as the flat areas on the right and left bank of the Serrapotamo stream;
- In Chiaromonte, the floodplain areas starting from the "Armirosse" ditch and included between the "Chiaromonte-Sinnica" municipal road and the embankment on the left bank of the Sinni River, as well as the floodplain areas located on the right of the Serrapotamo stream in the "Ischitella" locality of Chiaromonte;
- In Noepoli, the floodplain areas on the left bank of the Sarmento River in the Pantano di Noepoli and Piano delle Rose localities;
- In San Giorgio Lucano, the floodplain areas located on the left side of Sarmento River in "Rosaneto" and Piano delle Rose;
- In Valsinni, all the floodplain areas located on the right bank of the Sinni River;
- In Colobraro, the alluvial lands on the right bank of the Sinni River;
- In Tursi, the flat floodplain lands located on the right bank of the Agri River and precisely the "Giardini Monte and Giardini di Marone", and those on the right bank of the Sinni River up to the height of the junction between the S.S. Sinnica and the branch road to Tursi;
- in Montalbano Jonico, the alluvial lands along the left bank of the Agri River that, starting from the "Giardini di Isca", running all along the S.S. Val d'Agri 103, arrive at c.da Sant'Elena;
- in the case of Craco, the flat land that runs along the S.P. 76 Craco-Peschiera from the intersection with the S.S.103 to Km 8;
- in Roccanova, the flat lands to the right and left of the fiumarella of Roccanova;
- in Sant'Arcangelo, the floodplain lands between the bottom of the Agri Valley and the right bank of the homonymous river.

== Festival ==
To the bell pepper of Senise is dedicated a festival known as 'U strittul ru zafaran ('the alley of the bell pepper'), annually organized on August 11.

== See also ==
Media related to Peperone di Senise at Wikimedia Commons

- List of Capiscum cultivars
