= Aloo chokha =

Indian potato dish

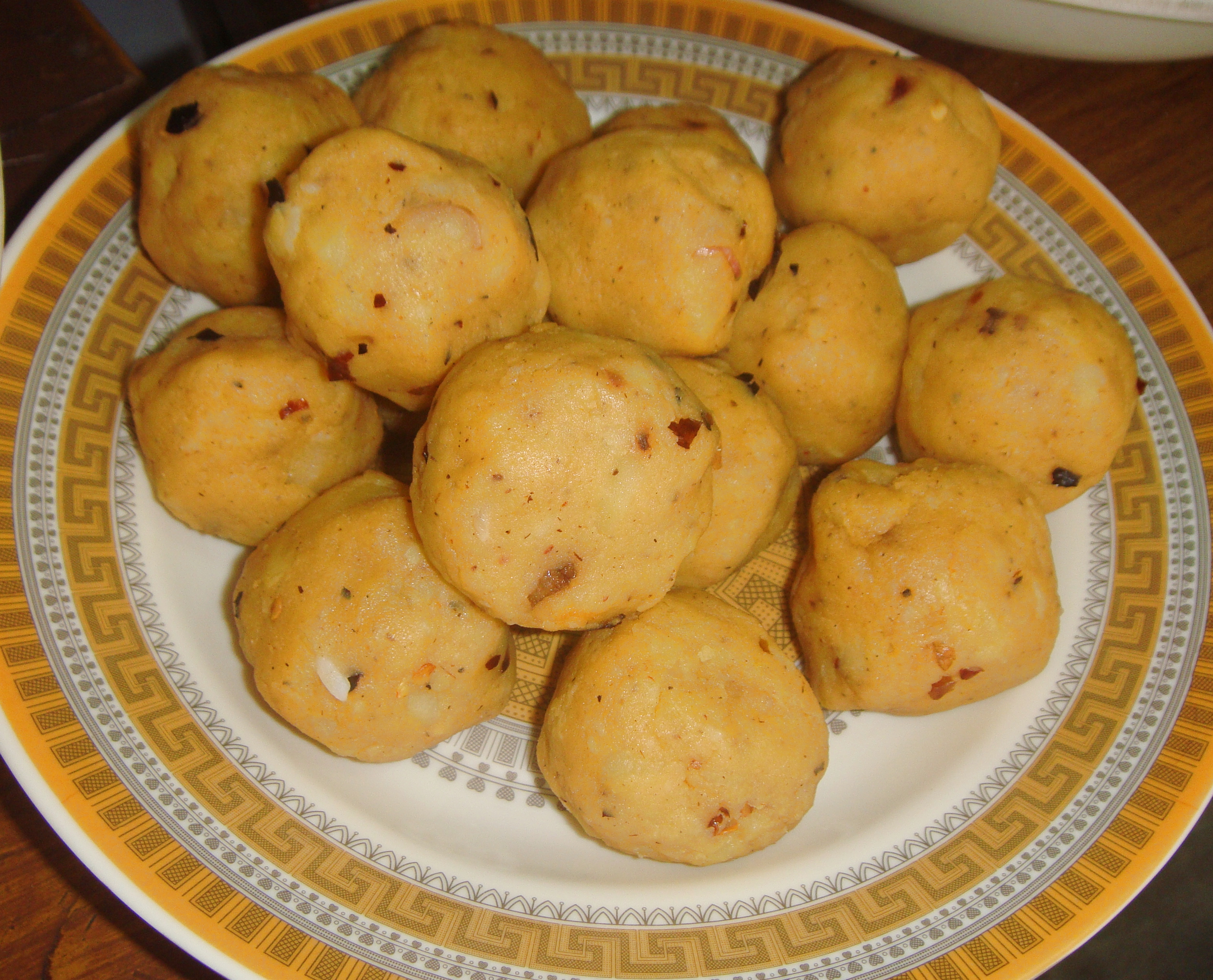
- Bengali prepared mashed potatoes
- Place of origin: Eastern part of Indian subcontinent
- Main ingredients: Potatoes, oil, onion, bell pepper, salt

Aloo chokha, or aloo bharta, is a dish made by mashing boiled potatoes and mixing chopped chilies, onion, salt and mustard oil. In the state of Bihar, Jharkhand and eastern Uttar Pradesh, specially in the Bhojpuri areas, it is served as one of the side dishes as part of litti chokha. It is usually eaten with khichadi in the eastern part of the Indian subcontinent.
