= Peperone crusco =

Variety of dry pepper typical of Lucanian cuisine

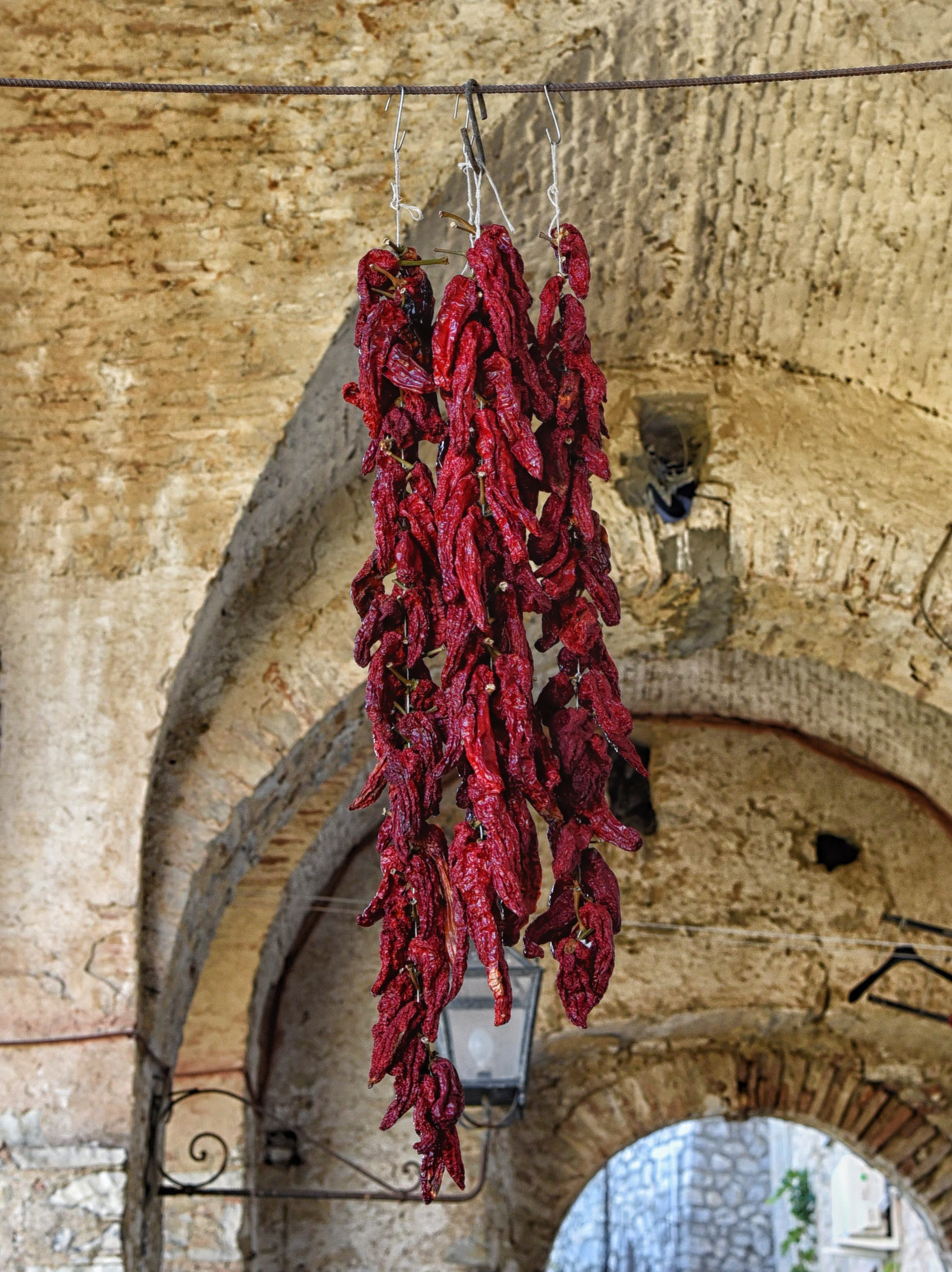
- Species: Capsicum annuum
- Origin: Basilicata, Italy
- Heat: None
- Scoville scale: 0 SHU

The peperone crusco ('crispy pepper' in the local dialects), also known as crusco pepper outside Italy, is a typical product of the Basilicata region of Italy.

It is recognised as a prodotto agroalimentare tradizionale (PAT). Being deeply rooted in local cuisine, it is often characterised as "the red gold of Basilicata".

Peperone crusco is also fairly common in Calabria and limited uses can be found in Apulia, Abruzzo, and Molise.

== Description ==
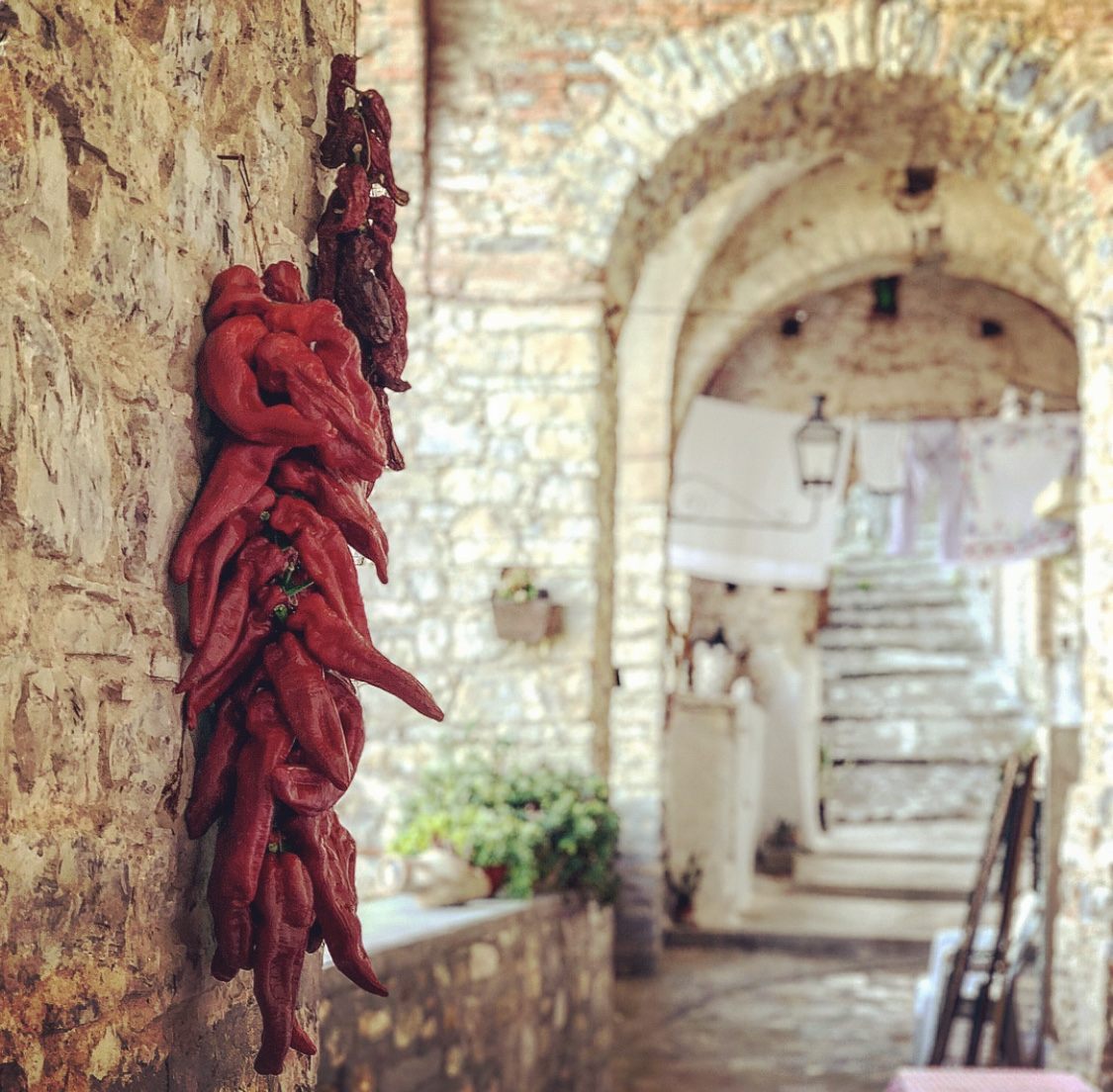
Peperoni cruschi

It is a dried and sweet-flavoured type of Capsicum annuum, cultivated in Basilicata since the 1600s. Usually the Senise pepper variety is used for its preparation, for the thin pulp and low water content which make it easier to be dried.

== Cultivation ==
Sowing begins in spring and harvest between July and August. Peppers are placed on cloths for three days in shady and dry places. Afterwards, they are tied with a lace forming garlands, called serte, and dried outdoors in the summer period. By tradition, they are hung on windows, balconies, and houses' walls.

== Culinary uses ==
The peperoni cruschi are a staple of Lucanian cuisine. They can be consumed on their own as a vegetable chip, as a side dish, and as a flavour enhancer. Regularly they are cleaned with a dry cloth or kitchen paper, deprived of the petiole and the seeds and flash-fried for one or two seconds in hot olive oil, achieving a crispy texture after cooling down. Among traditional dishes with peperone crusco as a relevant ingredient are pasta con i peperoni cruschi, baccalà alla lucana, acquasale and pane cotto.

== See also ==
- Cuisine of Basilicata
- List of dried foods
