= Senise =

Province of Potenza, Basilicata, southern Italy

- Comune
- Comune di Senise
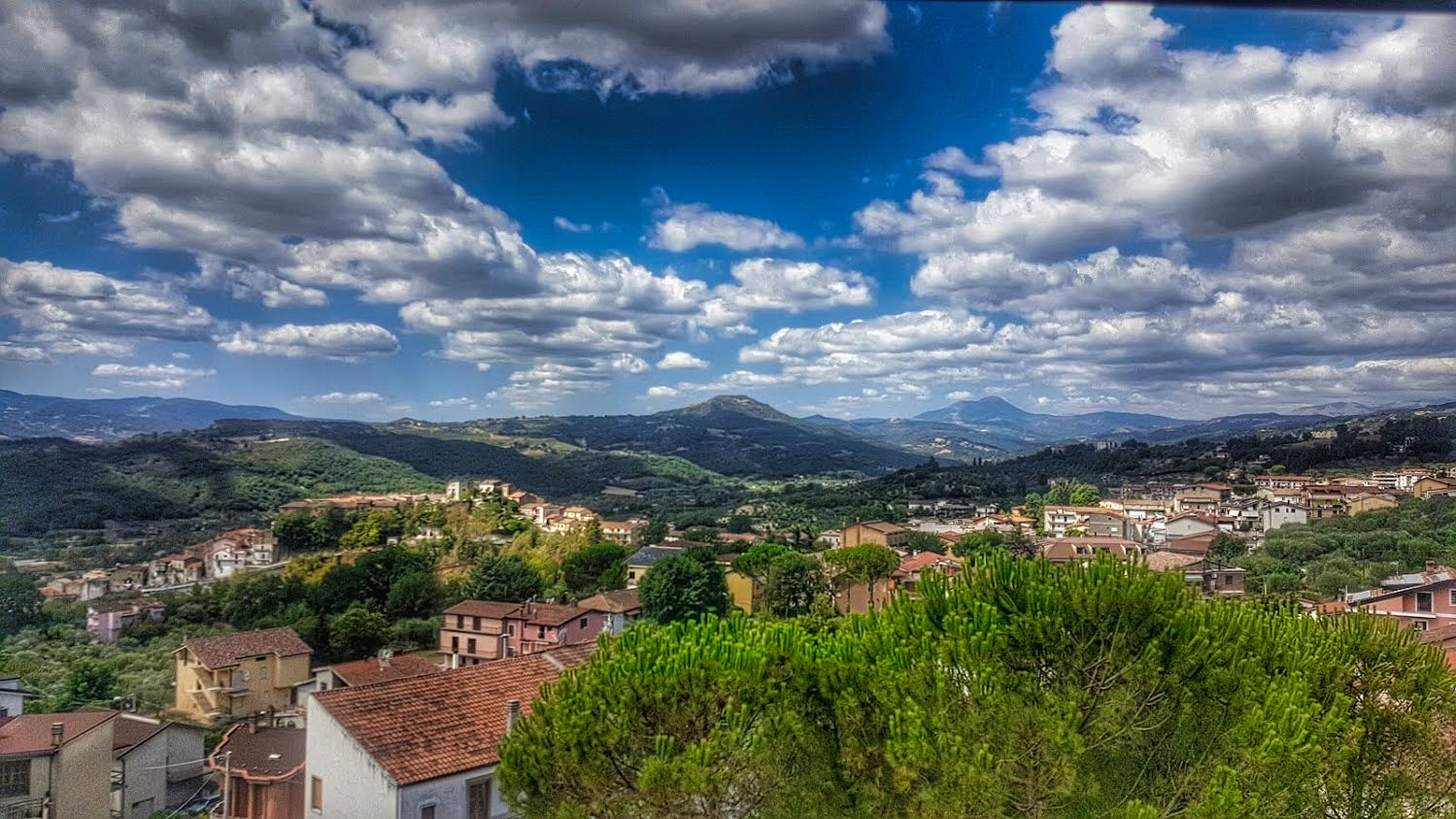
- View of Senise

- Coat of arms

- Location within Italy Location within Basilicata
- Coordinates: 40°8′N 16°17′E
- Country: Italy
- Region: Basilicata
- Province: Potenza (PZ)

Government
  - Mayor: Eleonora Castronuovo

Area
  - Total: 97.31 km^{2} (37.57 sq mi)
- Elevation: 335 m (1,099 ft)

Population (30 April 2023)
  - Total: 6,496
  - Density: 66.76/km^{2} (172.9/sq mi)
- Demonym: Senisesi
- Time zone: UTC+1 (CET)
  - Summer (DST): UTC+2 (CEST)
- Postal code: 85038
- Dialing code: 0973
- ISTAT code: 076085
- Patron saint: St. Roch
- Saint day: 16 August
- Website: Official website

Senise is a town in the province of Potenza, Basilicata, southern Italy. It is near Monte Cotugno Lake, one of the largest artificial basins in Europe.

== Twin towns ==
- Busto Garolfo, Italy
