= Vegetable sandwich =

Type of sandwich

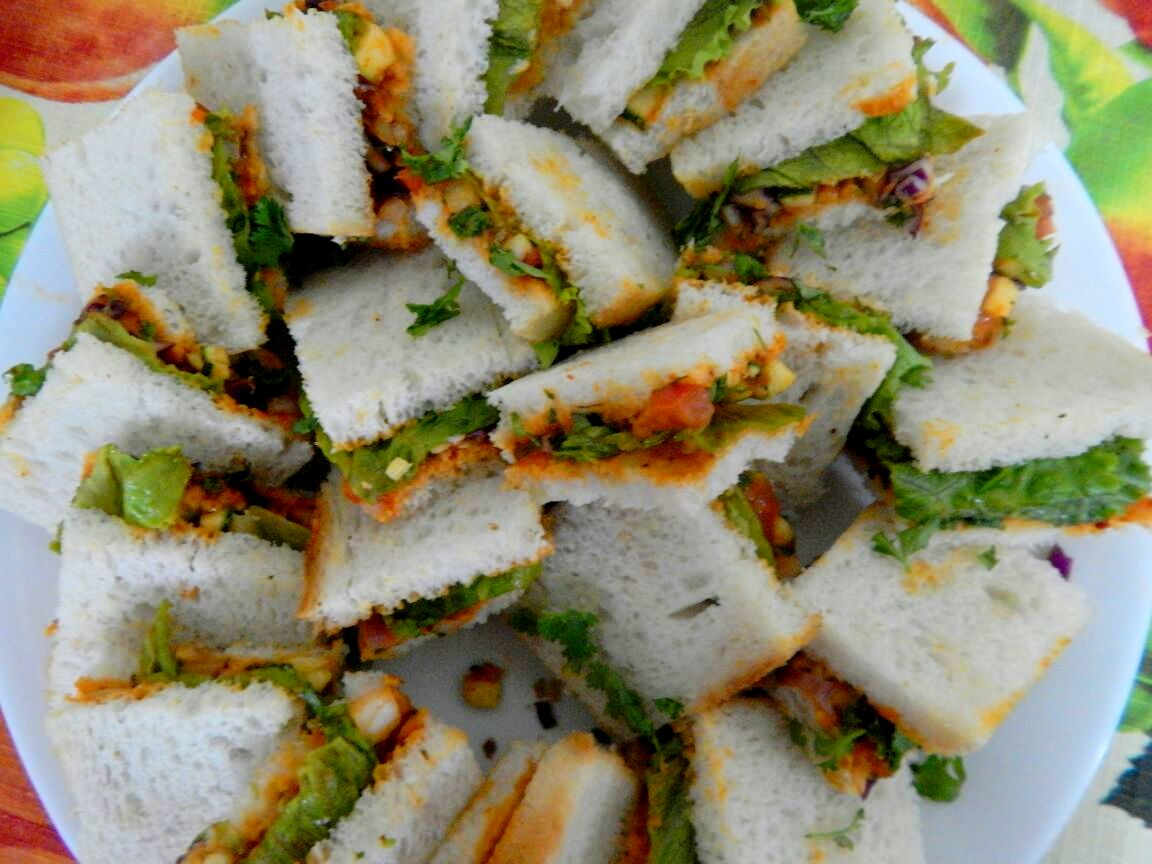
- Vegetable sandwich
- Main ingredients: Bread, vegetables

Vegetable sandwich is a type of vegetarian sandwich consisting of a vegetable filling between bread. There are no set requirements other than the use of vegetables, and sandwiches may be toasted or untoasted. Vegetable sandwiches are served throughout the world and are a popular street food in India.

== Cucumber sandwich ==
The cucumber sandwich originated in the UK. They are traditionally served with afternoon tea and on formal occasions. The cucumber is expected to be sliced as thinly as possible. The slices in a well presented cucumber sandwich should pass daylight.

== Mumbai vegetable sandwich ==
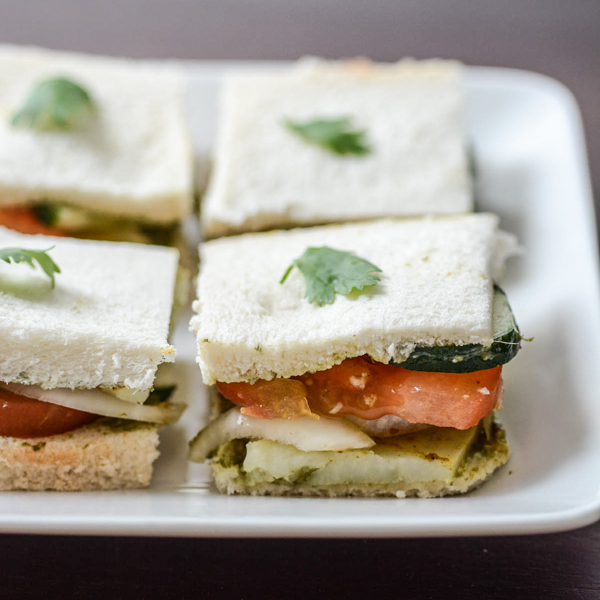
Mumbai vegetable sandwiches

The Mumbai vegetable sandwich, previously and still occasionally known as the Bombay vegetable sandwich, is a common street food in India, especially in Mumbai. The sandwich is made with Western style bread and is usually toasted. The main ingredients are a spicy green chutney spread, tomatoes, onions, cucumber, and a spicy potato filling made with chaat masala or a similar spice mix. Other ingredients sometimes included are cooked beetroot and cheese. The sandwich is a popular student lunch.

== Rainbow vegetable sandwich ==
The idea of the rainbow vegetable sandwich is to layer the vegetables in different colours to create a spectrum of colours. These can sometimes be constructed unfeasibly high in order to include the maximum number of different colours and textures.

== See also ==
- List of sandwiches
