= Fried cauliflower =

Widespread dish in Europe, Middle East, and Asia

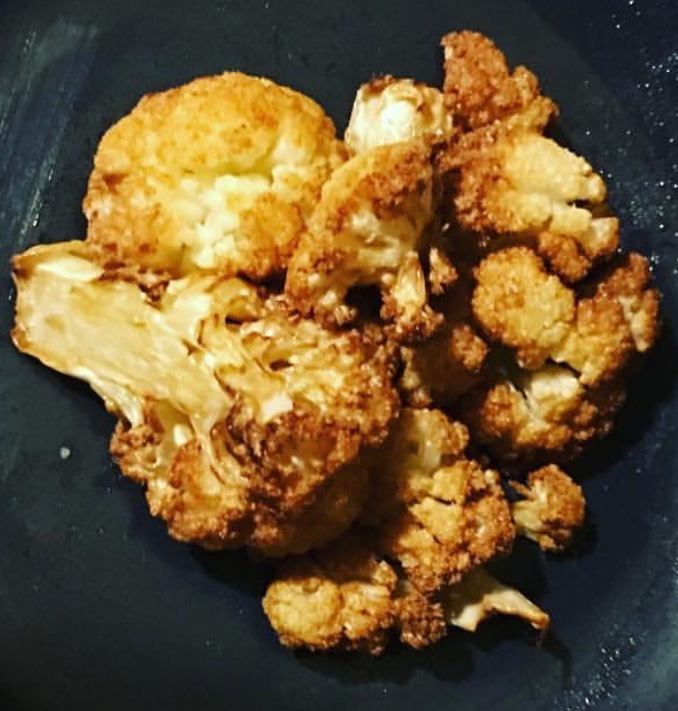
- Israeli-style fried cauliflower
- Course: Mezze, street food, sandwich, side dish
- Main ingredients: Cauliflower florets, cooking oil

Fried cauliflower is a popular dish in many cuisines of the Middle East, South Asia, Europe, and elsewhere. It may start from raw or cooked cauliflower; it may be dipped in batter or breading; it may be fried in oil, butter, or other fats. It can be served on its own, as a mezze or side dish, or in a sandwich. It is often seasoned with salt, spices, and a variety of sauces, in the Middle East often based on tahini or strained yogurt.

Cauliflower in general, and fried cauliflower in particular, has become increasingly popular in the United States.

== Preparation ==
Fried cauliflower may start from raw or cooked cauliflower. The cauliflower is separated into florets, then deep-fried. It may be fried plain; it may be breaded; it may be battered; or it may be simply floured.

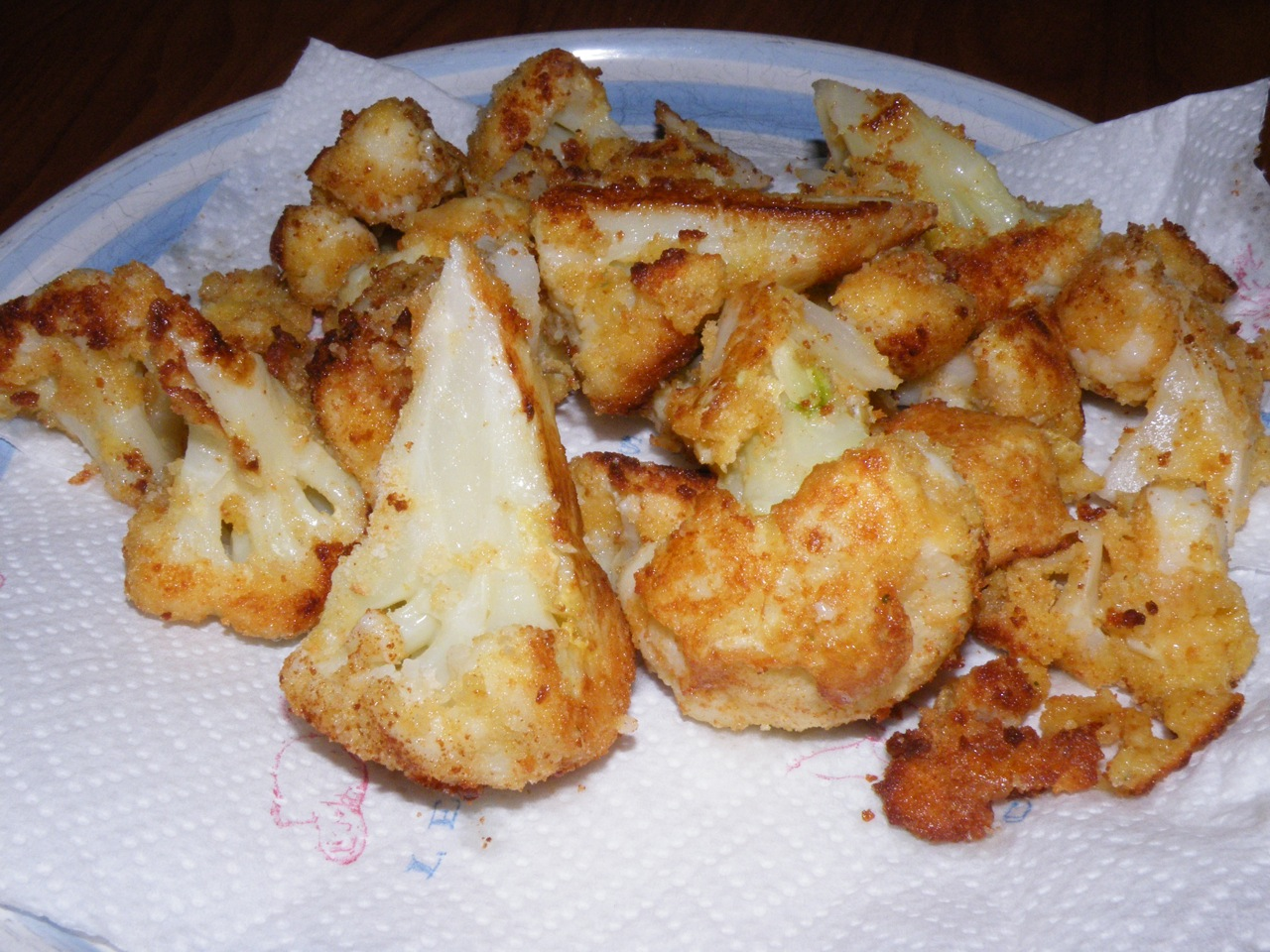
Breaded fried cauliflower in Israel

The plain version is the crispest, though the oiliest; the breaded and battered versions result in a moister, less crisp interior.

After draining, it may be seasoned or sauced in a variety of ways.

== History ==
Deep-fried and pan-fried cauliflower is found in many cuisines, and is well documented through the 19th century in Germany, Austria, Britain, and the United States. It is often called by its French name, choufleur frit.

== Regional versions ==
=== France ===
Fried battered cauliflower is served in French cuisine with a tomato sauce as fritot de chou-fleur.

=== India ===
A wide variety of fried cauliflower dishes are found in India.

Cauliflower pakoras, battered and spiced fried cauliflower, are popular in North India and Chennai, and may be double-fried for crispness. They can be served with a tomato or peanut chutney.

One Punjabi recipe deep-fries the cauliflower first, then sautés it in spices and yogurt to nap the florets with sauce.

=== Israel ===
Fried cauliflower is found both in Mizrahi and Sephardic traditions, which were brought to Israel when Jews immigrated to Israel, often as refugees.

Among the Mizrahi, fried cauliflower was often eaten as a mezze before large meals or in various salads (often dressed with tahini sauce, strained yogurt, or citrus juice). Over time, fried cauliflower was adopted as a street food. With the rise of fine dining in Israel, Israeli chefs have incorporated versions of the dish into their cooking, where it may be an important main dish.

In Israel, fried cauliflower is commonly served at falafel, shawarma, hummus, and sabich stands, often in a sandwich or as part of a salad bar: "Fried cauliflower is a staple of falafel-shop salad bars".

It is commonly served plain just with some salt. It may also be served with strained yogurt, tahini sauce, amba, zhug, or other condiments.

The Sephardic version, culupidia frita, is battered and often served with lemon (culupidia frita con limón), which is sometimes simmered with the cauliflower until it evaporates.

=== Italy ===
An early Italian recipe for fried cauliflower (1822) first parboils it, then breads it and fries it in oil or lard. Various versions of the dish are found in later cookbooks.

It continues to be part of the repertoire of Italian cuisine, and is sold as a street food in Sicily.

=== Levant ===
In Levantine cuisine as found in Lebanon, Syria, and Palestine fried cauliflower, zahra mekleyah (Arabic: الارنبيط المقلي, زهره مقليه), is served cold or hot.

It may be served in a sandwich of pita bread or sandwich bread, often toasted and sprinkled with cumin, salt, and lemon juice. It is also served as a side dish.

It may be battered or not.

Common accompaniments include tzatziki.

Variations include curried and roasted cauliflower, bell peppers, or a garlic lemon vinaigrette. The Syrian menazla zahra is cooked with garlic, ground beef, cilantro, cumin, and salt.

Fried cauliflower is also an ingredient in some dishes, such as maqluba, a sort of pilaf with meat and vegetables on top, and Mtafaye (Arabic: مطفّية), a dish using fried cauliflower cooked in yoghurt.

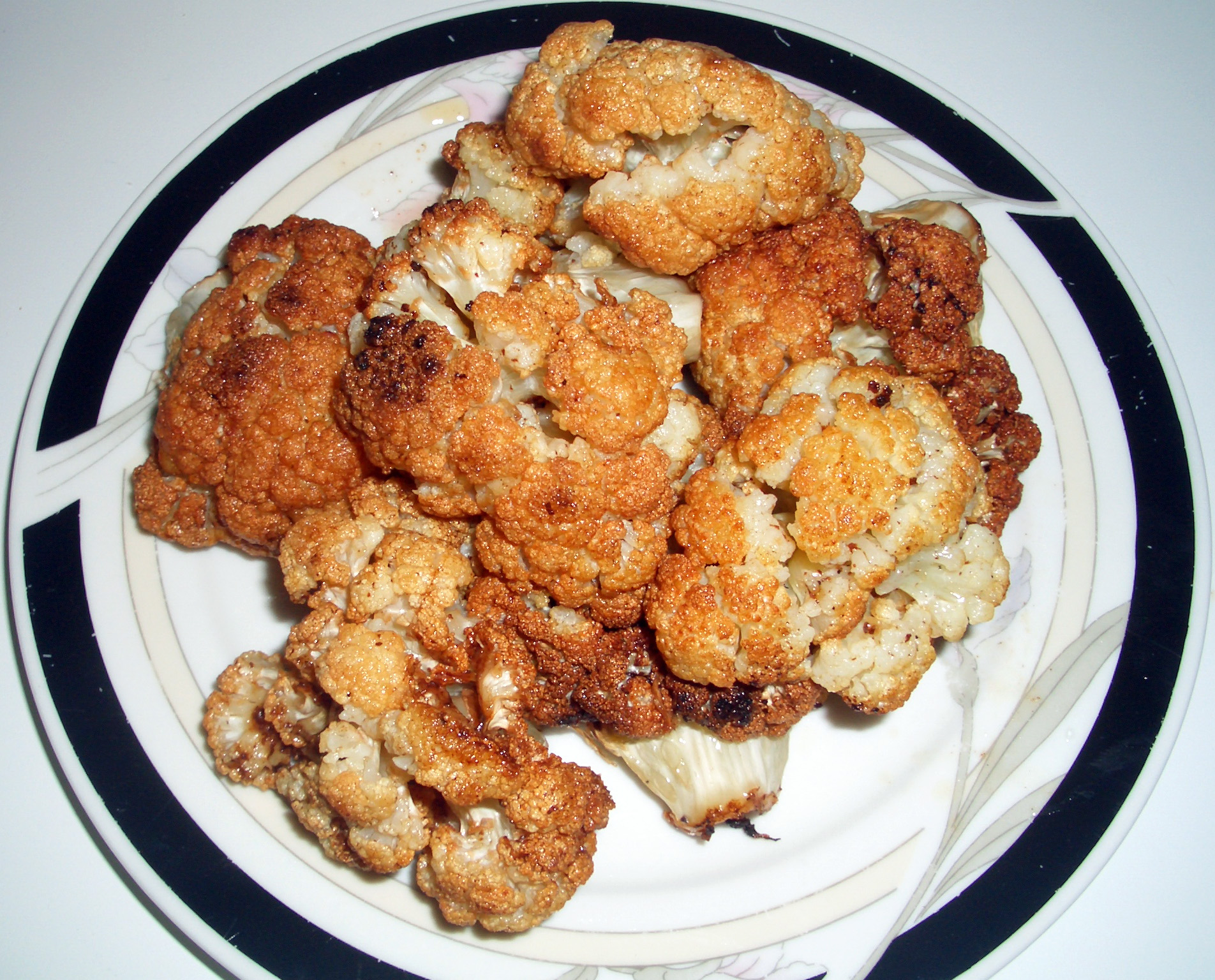
Zahra mekleyah

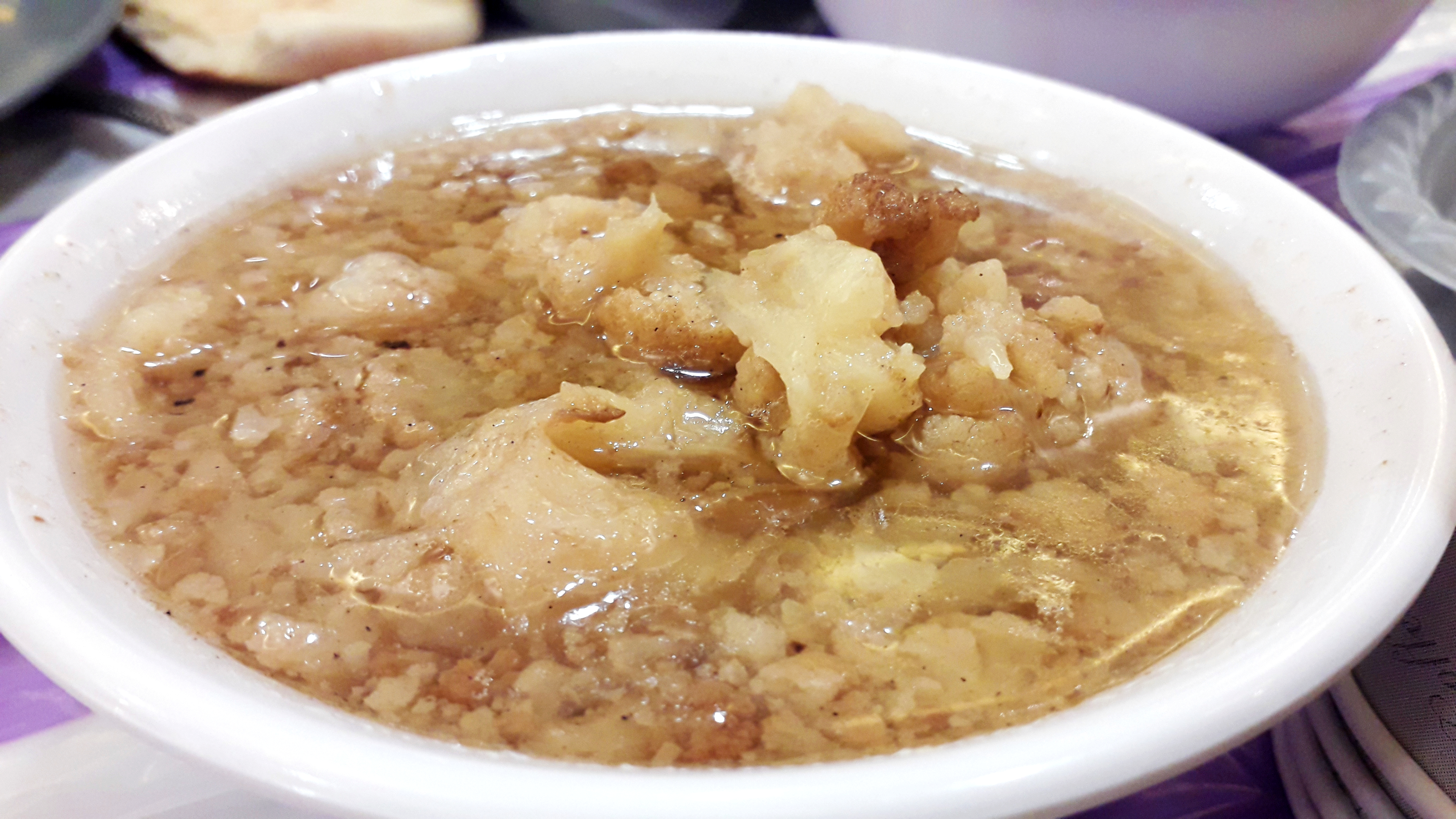
Mtafaye

=== United States ===
Fried cauliflower from Indian, Israeli, Italian, and Levantine traditions is found in the United States.

The Israeli versions are often found at Israeli, kosher, Jewish, and falafel restaurants. The growing fashion both for cauliflower and for Israeli cuisine has contributed to its popularity.

Some variants include serving with a white wine vinaigrette, currants, and pine nuts; frying a whole head and serving with a beet tahini sauce; or serving with a herbed labneh sauce.
