= Montanaro (disambiguation) =

Montanaro is a municipality in the Metropolitan City of Turin in the Italian region Piedmont.

Montanaro may also refer to:

- Montanaro (surname), an Italian surname
- Montanaro (grape), an Italian wine grape

== See also ==
- Montanari (disambiguation)
