= Linguine =

Type of pasta

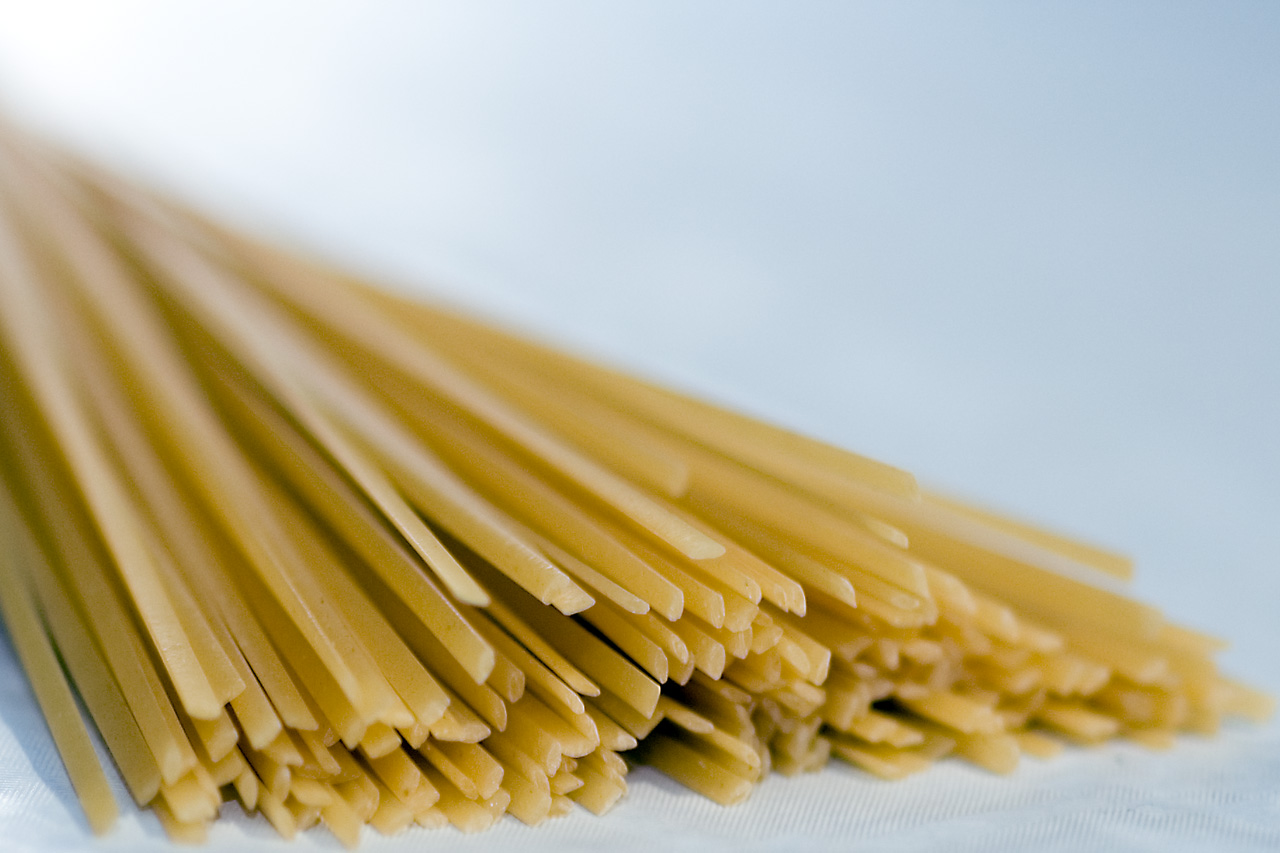
- Type: Pasta
- Place of origin: Italy
- Region or state: Liguria
- Main ingredients: Flour (usually from durum wheat), egg
- Variations: Linguettine

Linguine (lit. 'little tongues'), (Note: Italian: [liŋˈɡwiːne]) sometimes anglicized as linguini, is a type of pasta similar to fettuccine and trenette, distinguished by its elliptical rather than flat section. Around about 4 millimetres (5/32 in) in width, it is wider than spaghetti, but less wide than fettuccine. Linguine was traditionally served with sauces such as pesto, but others such as tomato or fish-based sauces are popular as well.

Linguine originated in the city of Genoa and is based on more traditional pastas.

== Etymology ==
Linguine comes from the Latin word lingua, meaning 'tongue'. The modern language closest to Latin is Italian, and the Italian word linguine, plural of the feminine linguina, means 'little tongues'. A thinner version of linguine is called linguettine.

== History ==
Linguine, a type of flattened spaghetti, was initially documented in the 1700s in Genoa, Italy, by Giulio Giacchero, an economist and writer. Giacchero, author of a book on the economy of Genoa in the 1700s, wrote about linguine served with green beans, potatoes, and a Genovese specialty—basil pesto. He claimed it was the typical festive dish of Ligurian families of the 1700s.

Liguria is the coastal region in far northwest Italy on the Ligurian Sea, dominated by the ancient port of Genoa. Basil pesto is a traditional dish there, and is typically served over linguine.

In the United States, National Linguine Day occurs on 15 September every year.

== Production ==
The production of linguine involves mixing semolina flour or durum flour and water to form a dough, which is then rolled out and cut into flat strands. This elongated shape is the primary way linguine and spaghetti are distinguished, the latter being round. Before the proliferation of modern production techniques, pasta-making was a labor-intensive process carried out by hand.

Wheat can also be ground into whole-wheat flour, then kneaded with water to make whole grain linguine.

== Nutrition ==
Linguine
Nutritional value per 100 g (3.5 oz)
- Energy: 433 kcal (1,810 kJ)
- Carbohydrates: 58.9 g
- Dietary fibre: 2.2 g
- Fat: 17.8 g
- Protein: 8.89 g
Vitamins and minerals
Minerals	Quantity %DV^{†}
Calcium	13% 167 mg
Iron	9% 1.6 mg
Sodium	55% 1270 mg
- Other constituents: Quantity
- Cholesterol: 11 mg
- Source: USDA
- ^{†}Percentages estimated using US recommendations for adults.

== Preparation ==
Dry linguine is cooked in a pot of salted, boiling water. The linguine is stirred gently to prevent sticking together and cooked for 8–10 minutes or until al dente.

Linguine's flat shape provides a surface area for clinging to sauces, making it more common for seafood dishes. This quality makes it the preferred type of pasta for seafood among Neapolitans.

== See also ==
Media related to Linguine at Wikimedia Commons

- List of pasta
- Trenette
