= Montanari =

Montanari may refer to:

- Montanari (surname), an Italian surname
- Montanari (crater), a lunar crater
- 8421 Montanari, a main-belt asteroid
- Antonio Montanari, baroque composer

== See also ==
- Montanaro (disambiguation)
