= Montanari (surname) =

Montanari is an Italian surname meaning mountaineer or highlander. Its highest concentration occurs in the region of Emilia Romagna. Notable people with the surname include:

- Antonio Montanari, Italian violinist and composer
- Christian Montanari, Sammarinese racing car driver
- Geminiano Montanari, Italian astronomer
- Giuseppe Montanari, Italian painter
- Giuseppe Montanari, Italian comic artist
- Marcello Montanari, Italian football player
- Massimo Montanari, Italian history
- Richard Montanari, American crime writer
- Roberto Montanari, Italian painter
- Silvia Montanari, Argentine actress
- Wolfango Montanari, Italian sprinter
