= Spaghetti =

Type of pasta

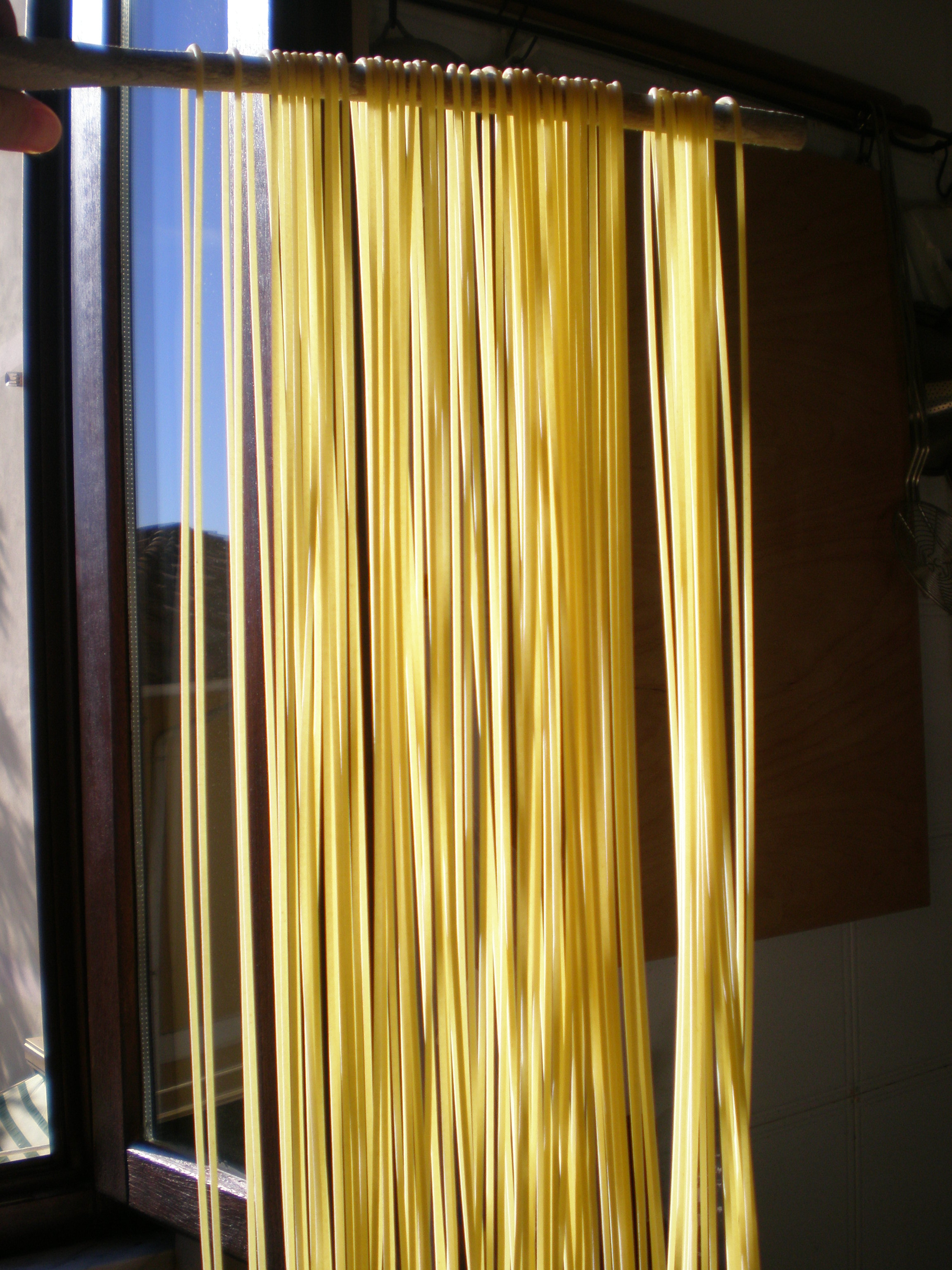
Spaghettoni on a rod, hung to dry

Spaghetti (Italian: [spaˈɡetti] 'little strings' plural diminutive of spago 'string'; similarly spaghetto is a single strand) is a long, thin, solid, cylindrical pasta. It serves as a staple food of Italian cuisine and is made of milled wheat and water (sometimes enriched with vitamins and minerals), with the standard Italian version using durum-wheat semolina. The pasta is usually white because refined flour is used, but whole wheat flour may be added. Spaghettoni is a thicker form of spaghetti, while spaghettini is a thinner form. Capellini is a very thin spaghetti, while vermicelli is intermediate.

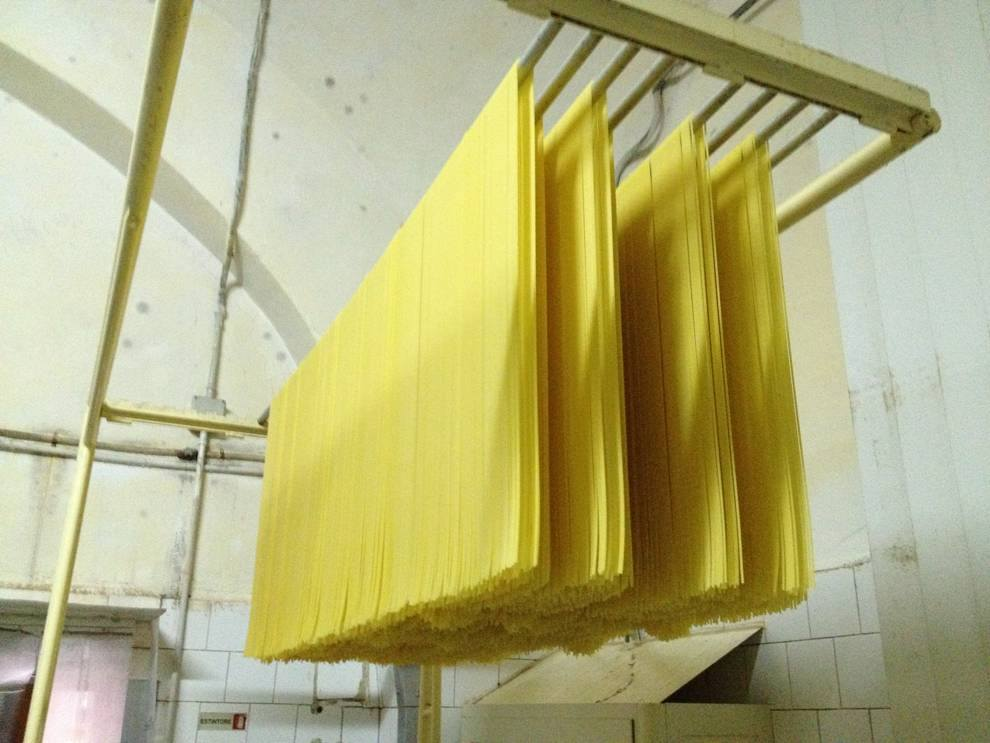
A rack of drying spaghetti in a factory in Gragnano.

Originally, spaghetti was notably long, but shorter lengths gained popularity during the second half of the 20th century. Today, it is most commonly available in lengths of 25–30 cm (10–12 in). Various pasta dishes are based on it, and it is frequently served with tomato sauce, meat or vegetables.

== History ==
=== Early ===
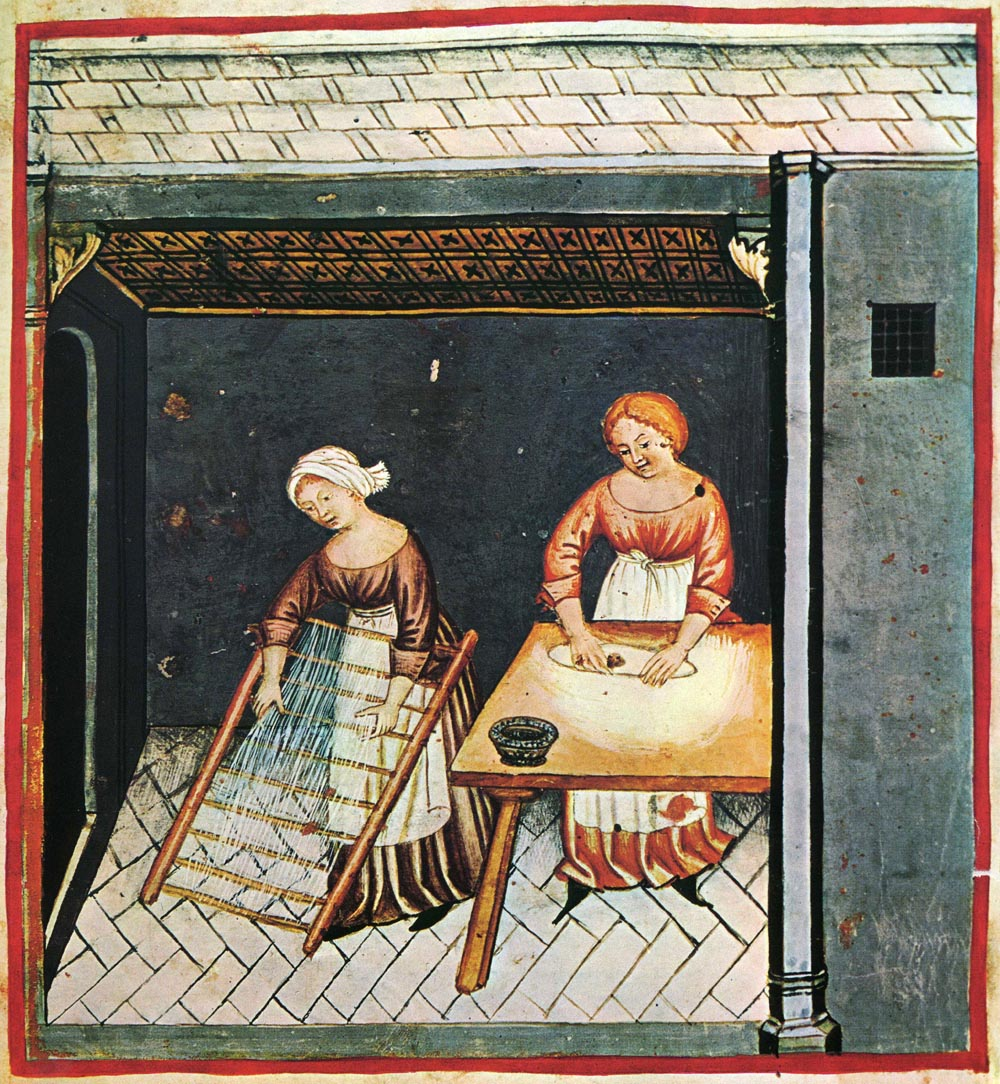
14th century depiction of pasta making

Spaghetti originated from an ancient, thin, and generally unleavened Middle Eastern bread, known as lakhsha in the Persian Sasanian Empire. Bakers flattened the dough by hand or with a rolling pin, and occasionally dried for preservation. Under the Sasanian Empire, it took on the name rishta when cut into strips or strings before drying —a term possibly derived from the Iranian word risnatu, for which records of use exist as far back as the 2nd millennium BC.

While pasta-drying traditions developed in Persia, pasta that was introduced from the Middle East was also consumed in ancient in Roman and Greek societies. In Greece and Rome, the dough was frequently dried into long, stretched shapes. In the 7th century, Arabs conquered Persia, and thereafter spread the dried pasta custom throughout the lands they occupied, which included Sicily from the 9th century. There, the dried pasta practice became associated with the European traditions of making fresh pasta, and the name itriyya entered the language, meaning "long-form dried pasta". The very first recorded appearance of this new type of thin, dried pasta occurred in Trabia, near Palermo, as documented by the geographer Al-Idrisi.

=== Arrival in the Italian peninsula ===
By the mid-12th century, records exist of several farms in Sicily producing itriyya at scale for local and export markets. Over the following centuries, this pasta appeared in Italian cookbooks, albeit infrequently. A precise description of the manufacture of "Sicilian macaroni" is given by Martino da Como in the late-15th century: a ball of dough, stretched thin, cut with a wire as "thin as spagho (string)", dried under the sun. The duration of this drying process varied with weather and humidity, but twelve days in the summer was typical. In another recipe for a Genoese pasta, Martino employs spagho for the first time in a culinary context when he says pasta ought to be cut "as thin as a spagho". Several tools were employed for this cutting process, including chitarra in areas of southern Italy, which consisted of a wooden frame strung with wires, lowered onto the dough.

Pasta at this time was cooked for much longer than it is today; Martino recommends his Sicilian macaroni be boiled in water for two hours to achieve a desired, very soft texture. Contemporary ideas of how this pasta should be served were based on the ideas of physicians, who followed Hippocrates and Galen's principle of contraria contrariis curantur ('opposites cure opposites'). For a very soft pasta, this meant expensive accompaniments of dried spices and pepper. Cheese, particularly the drier, aged varieties, was another common pairing for the same reason, the most popular for the task by the mid-15th century being pecorino and parmigiano. The slippery texture and hot serving temperature of pasta facilitated the introduction of the fork to Italy, replacing earlier practices of eating pasta and other foods by hand, and by the 14th century, the first descriptions of spaghetti being twirled with a fork were emerging.

=== Later ===
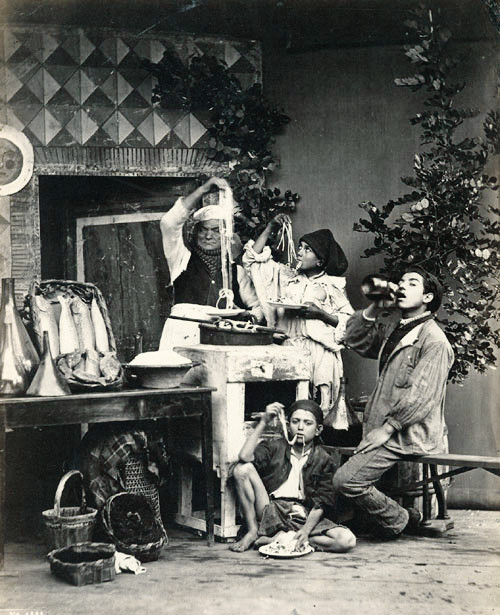
A 19th century photograph by Giorgio Sommer showing street scenes of eating spaghetti. Ancient records demonstrate the existence of thread-like doughs made from water and various types of flours, which developed in parallel and independently across both Mediterranean and Far Eastern civilizations.

In the 17th century, the region associated with pasta expanded from Sicily to Naples. Initially, Sicilians were depicted as 'macaroni eaters' and Neapolitans as 'leaf eaters' due to their vegetable-heavy diet; later, Neapolitans were also called 'macaroni eaters'. Around 1630, Naples under Spanish rule was experiencing famines with a reduced supply of meat and vegetables due to poor governance. As technology permitting industrial mixing and extrusion dramatically reduced prices of output, pasta became a staple food, no longer the domain of the elite. It is in this century that short cook times and firmer pasta textures emerged, although at first only for fresh pasta; it took until the mid-19th century in Naples for records of cooks taking a short cook time and firm texture for granted.

Around this time, pairing tomato sauces with pastas was becoming established among the Naples populace, the first records of the combination having appeared at the end of the previous century. Grated cheese remained an essential element in preparations, although unlike in modern servings, sauces were served over grated cheese. It was not until the 20th century that the inverse became established.

By the 1920s, food writer Waverley Root could witness scenes in Naples of "home-made macaroni hung out to dry like the family washing—at the mercy of dust, dirt, insects and the depredations of passing pigeons, children and dogs". By 1955, annual consumption of spaghetti in Italy doubled from 14 kg (31 lb) per person before World War II to 28 kg (62 lb). In that year, Italy produced almost 1.5 million tons of spaghetti, of which approximately 5% was exported.

=== Marco Polo story ===
Through the end of the 13th century, the Venetian merchant and adventurer Marco Polo travelled into Asia, detailing his expedition in The Travels of Marco Polo. Two centuries later, the geographer Giovanni Battista Ramusio read Polo's accounts in preparation for a new edition. In one of his stories, Polo told of the preparations made by the people of Sumatra with sago flour, likening them to the pastas and lasagnas he was familiar with in Italy, and described how he brought back samples to Venice. Misunderstanding this, in his 1559 publication Ramusio conveyed that Marco Polo had discovered pasta in China and brought it to Italy.

This legend persisted, and was developed further in a 1929 article in the American industry newsletter the Macaroni Journal, where the author credited the invention of spaghetti to a member of Polo's crew named Spaghetti. In the story, Spaghetti made landfall in China in search of water. On shore, he encountered a farm woman stirring a batter that hardened in the hot, dry climate. Realising this would store well on long voyages, Spaghetti returned to the boat with some batter, kneaded it, formed it into long strips, and cooked it in the salty seawater.

== Production ==
Spaghetti is made from ground grain (flour) and water. Whole wheat and multigrain spaghetti are also sold. Most spaghetti is produced in factories using auger extruders. As the ingredients are mixed and kneaded, attention is paid to prevent air bubbles and ensure a homogenous mix. The forming dies are water-cooled to prevent overheating and spoiling the pasta. While drying the spaghetti, care is taken to prevent strands from sticking together and to leave sufficient moisture to avoid a product that is too brittle. Packaging for protection and display has moved from paper wrapping to plastic bags and boxes. In Naples, spaghetti is thinner than it is in the United States. Spaghettoni is a thicker spaghetti, and spaghettini is a thinner spaghetti, although it is thicker than the pasta of Naples.

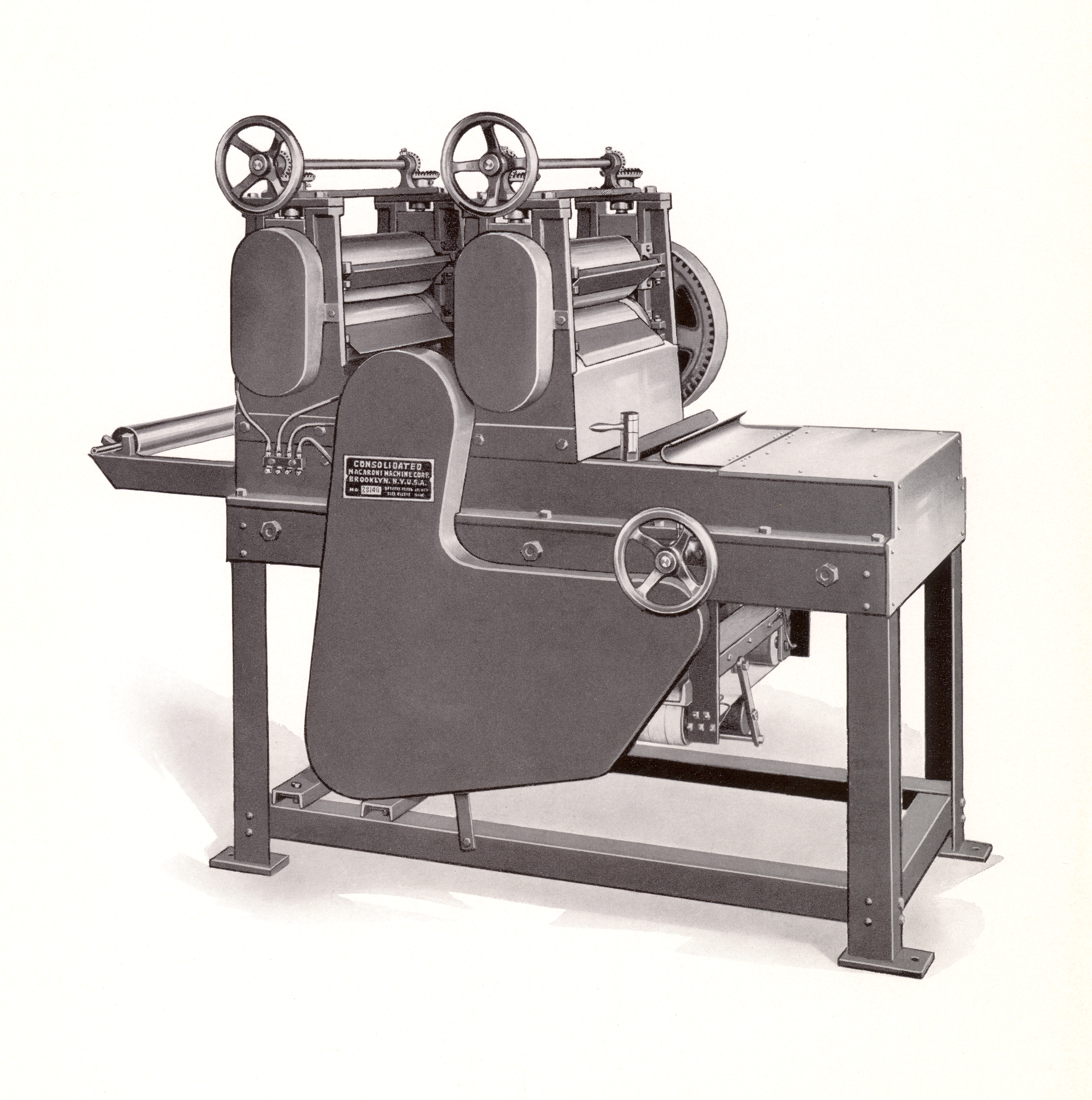
Pasta sheeter c. 1935

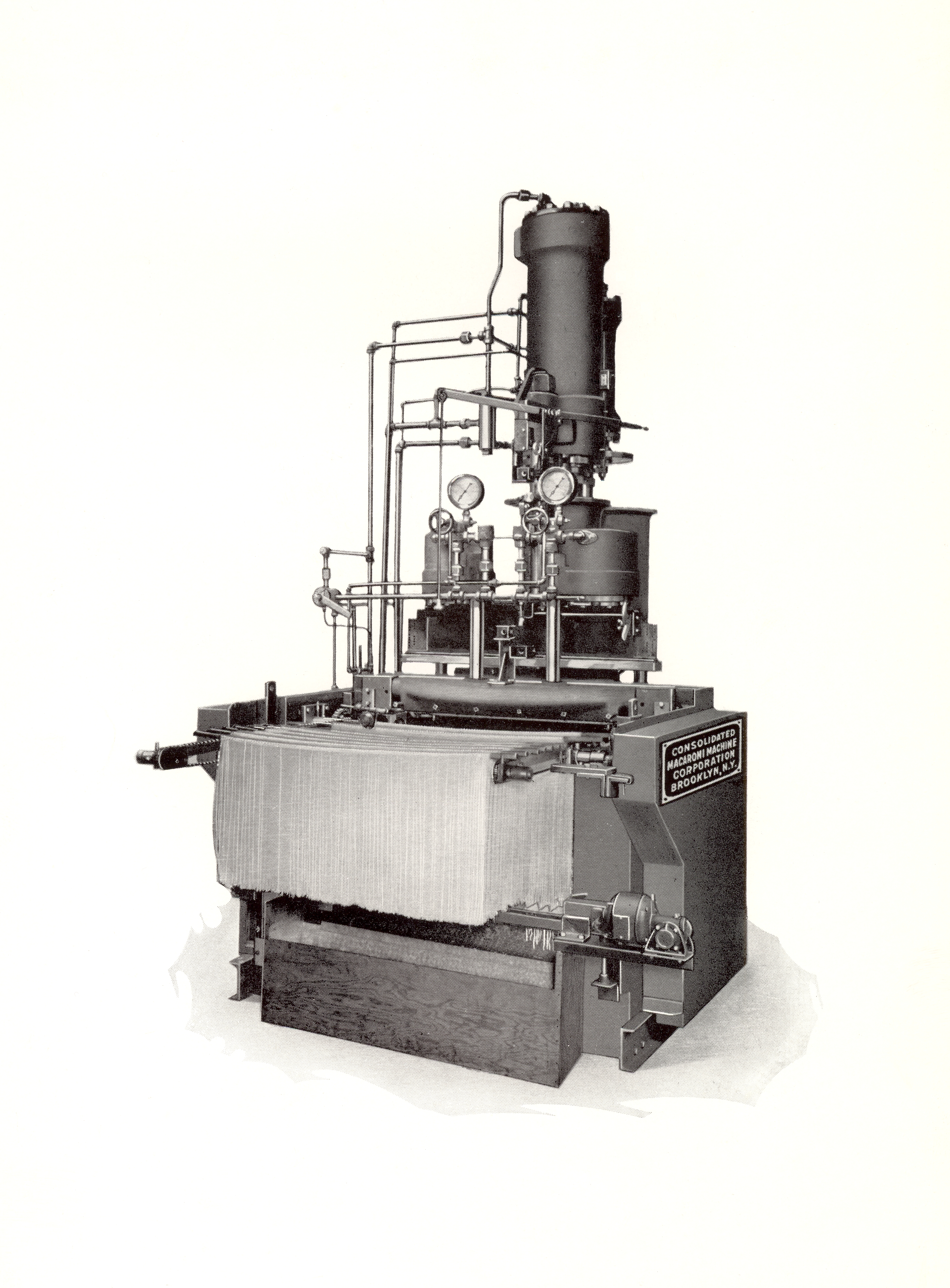
A hydraulic press with an automatic spreader, manufactured by the Consolidated Macaroni Machine Corporation, Brooklyn, New York. This machine was the first to spread long-cut alimentary paste products onto a drying stick.

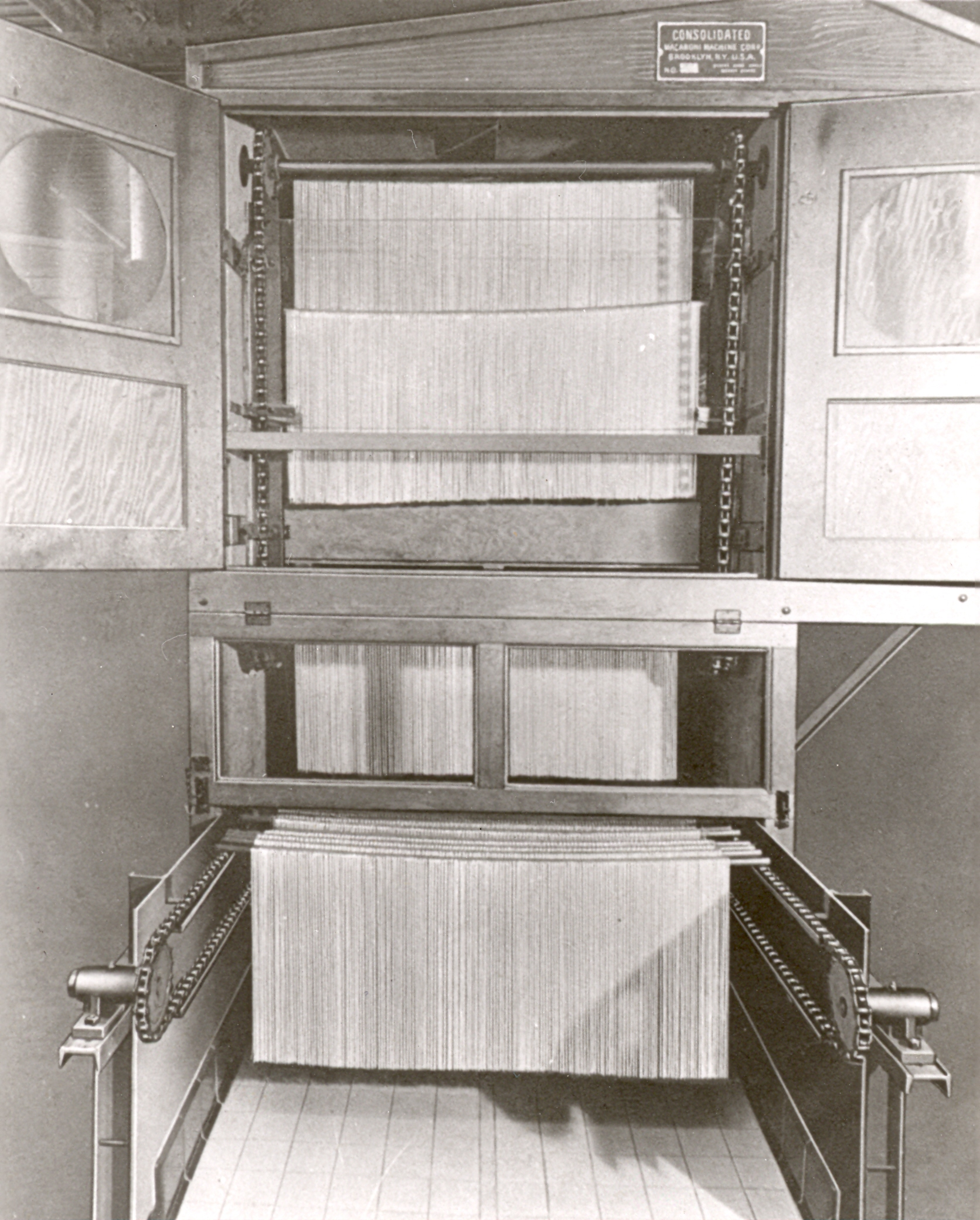
An industrial dryer for spaghetti or other long goods pasta products, also by the Consolidated Macaroni Machine Corporation

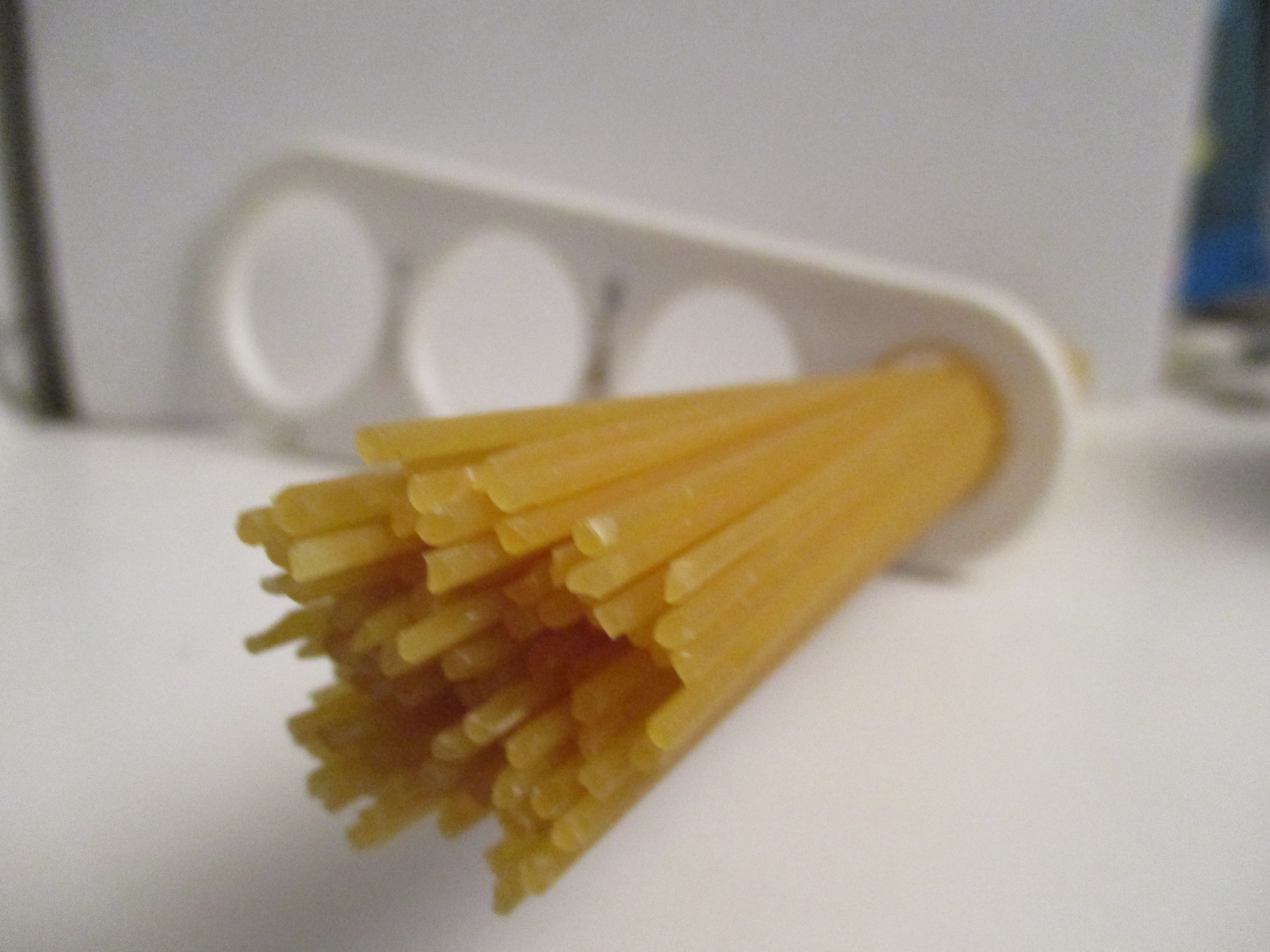
A "spaghetti measure" that can portion out 1, 2, 3 or 4 servings with circles of different diameters

== Nutrition ==
Spaghetti (enriched, dry)
Nutritional value per 70 g (2 1/2 oz)
- Energy: 460 kJ (110 kcal)
- Carbohydrates: 22g
- Sugars: 0g
- Dietary fiber: 1g
- Fat: 0.5g
- Saturated: 0g
- Trans: 0g
- Protein: 4g
Vitamins and minerals
Vitamins	Quantity %DV^{†}
Vitamin A equiv.	0% 0 μg
Vitamin C	0% 0 mg
Minerals	Quantity %DV^{†}
Calcium	0% 0 mg
Iron	22% 4 mg
Sodium	0% 0 mg
- Source: USDA
- ^{†}Percentages estimated using US recommendations for adults.

Pasta provides carbohydrates along with some protein, iron, dietary fiber, potassium, and B vitamins. Choosing a whole-wheat variety delivers significantly more fiber than pasta made from refined or degermed flour.

== Preparation ==
Fresh or dried spaghetti is cooked in a large pot of salted, boiling water and then drained in a colander (Italian: scolapasta). Utensils used in its preparation include the spaghetti scoop and spaghetti tongs.

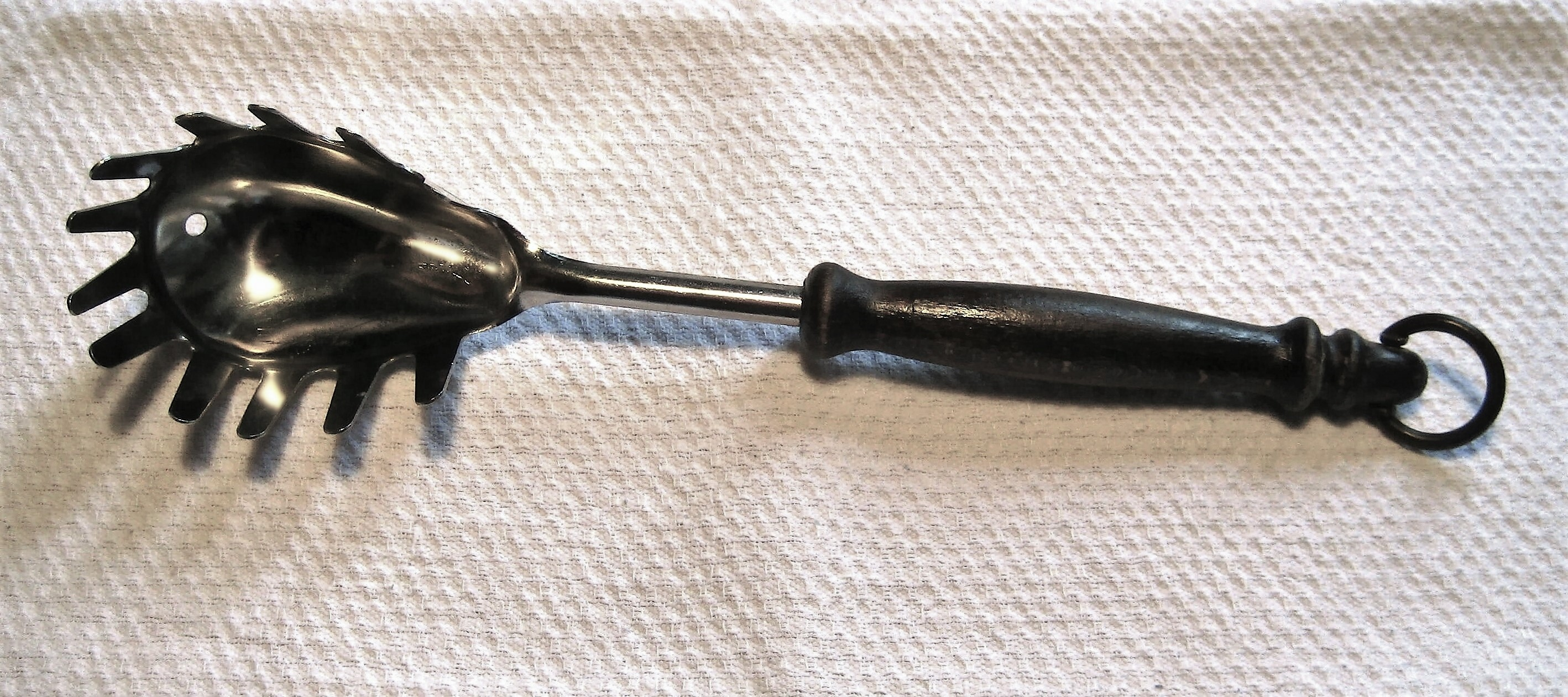
A spaghetti scoop

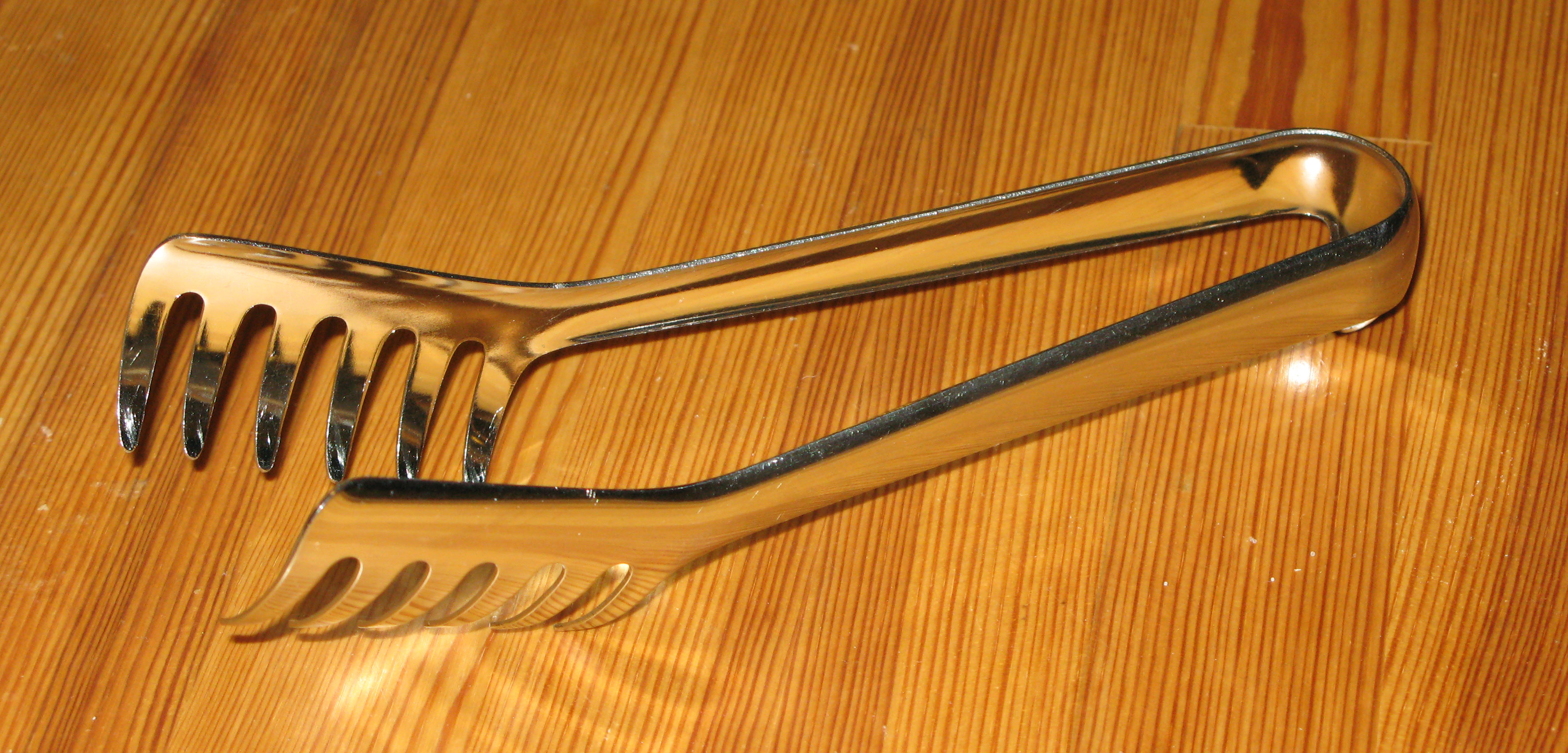
Stainless steel spaghetti tongs

In Italy, spaghetti is generally cooked al dente (lit. 'to the tooth'), meaning it is fully cooked but still firm to the bite; however, it may also be cooked to a softer consistency. Spaghettoni takes more time to cook than regular spaghetti, whereas spaghettini takes less time. In southern Italy, spaghetti is sometimes placed in a dishcloth and broken into pieces to be served with vegetables, legumes or in a broth. This practice originated at a time when the region was very poor, and broken pieces of spaghetti were sold at a discount to prevent waste. Offcuts are still sold in parts of Italy, both alone and as part of pasta mista (an assortment of pasta shapes). Some factories donate their broken pieces to hospitals and nursing homes.

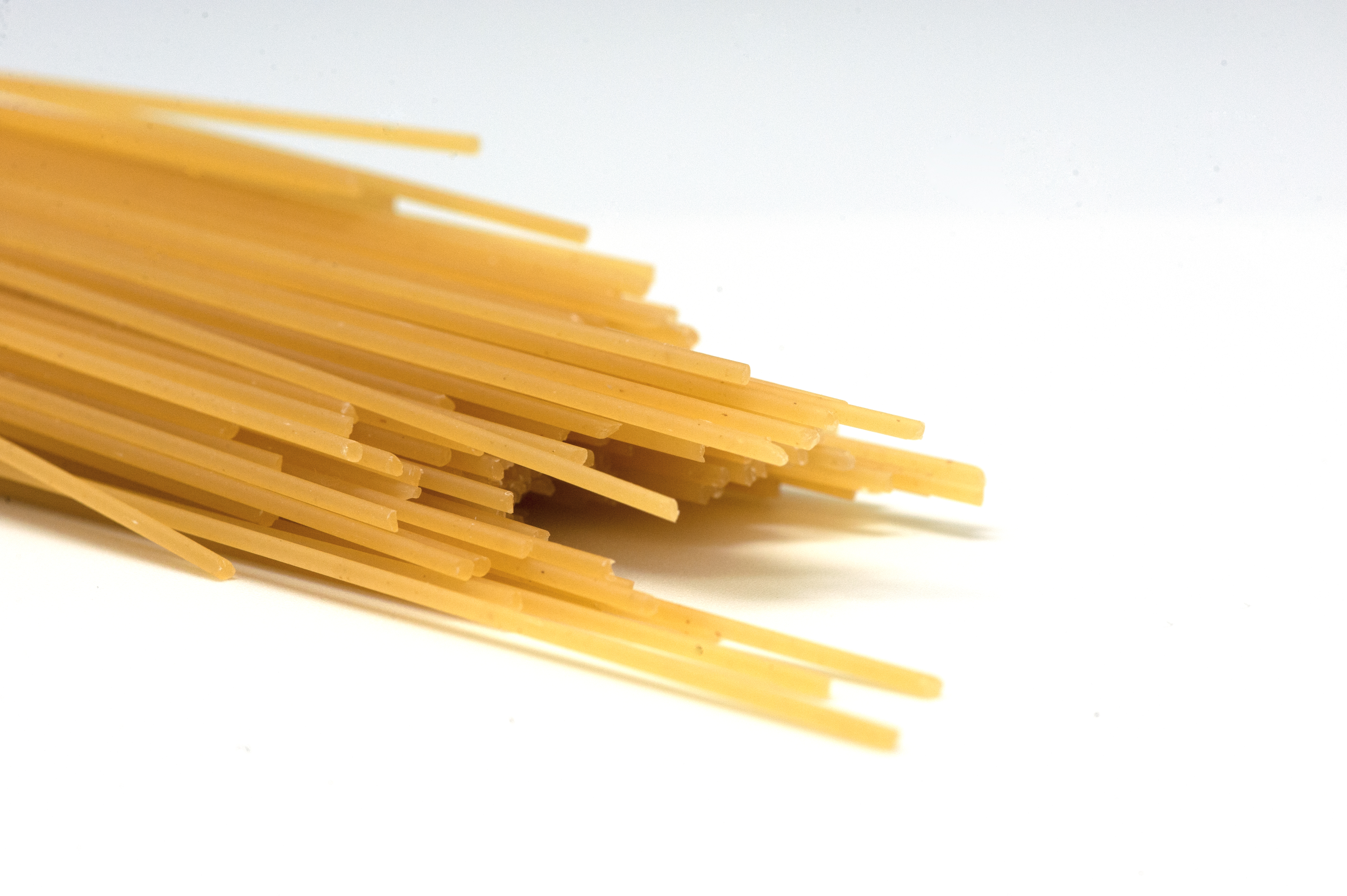
Dry industrial spaghetti

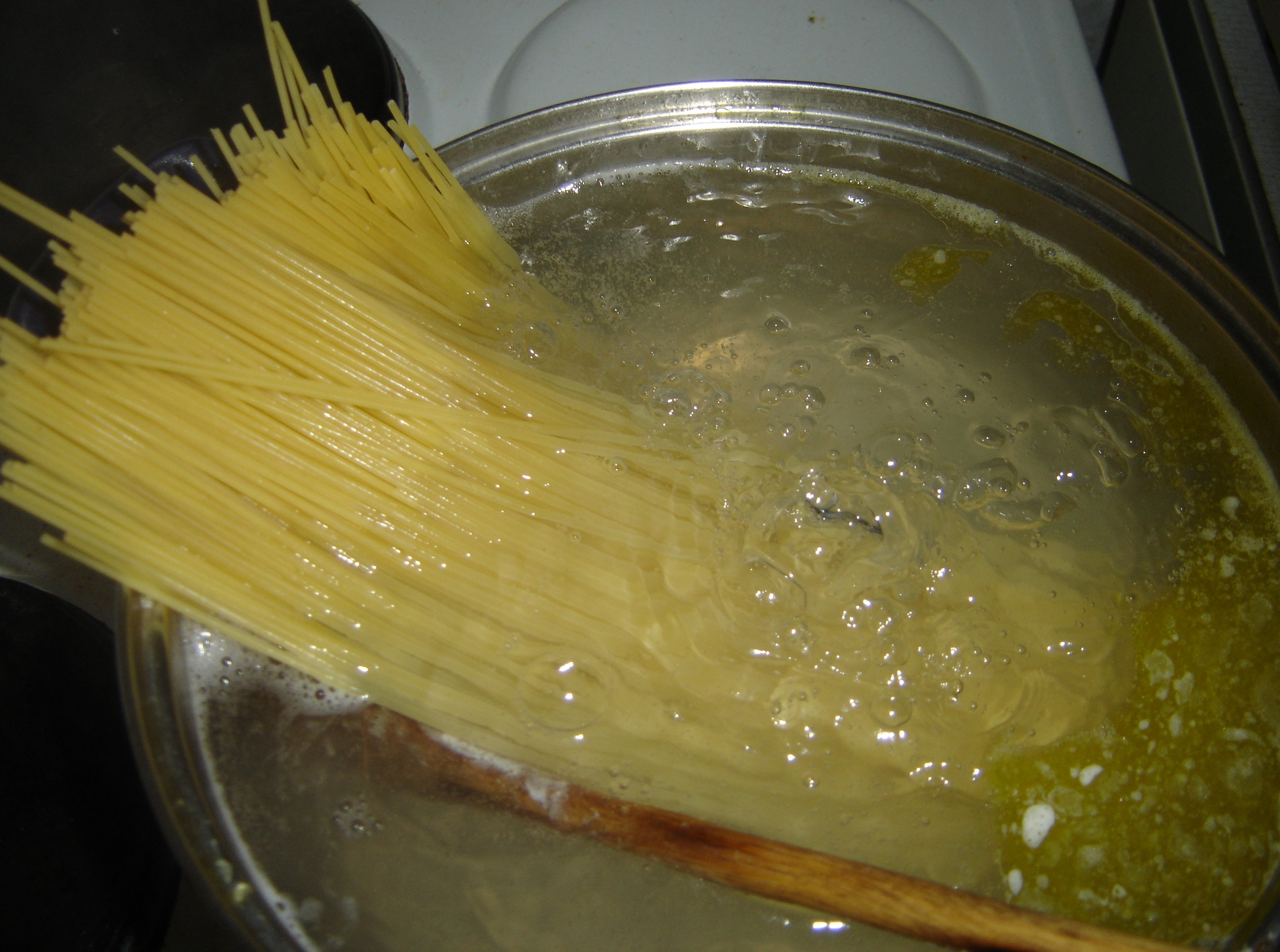
Spaghetti being placed in boiling water

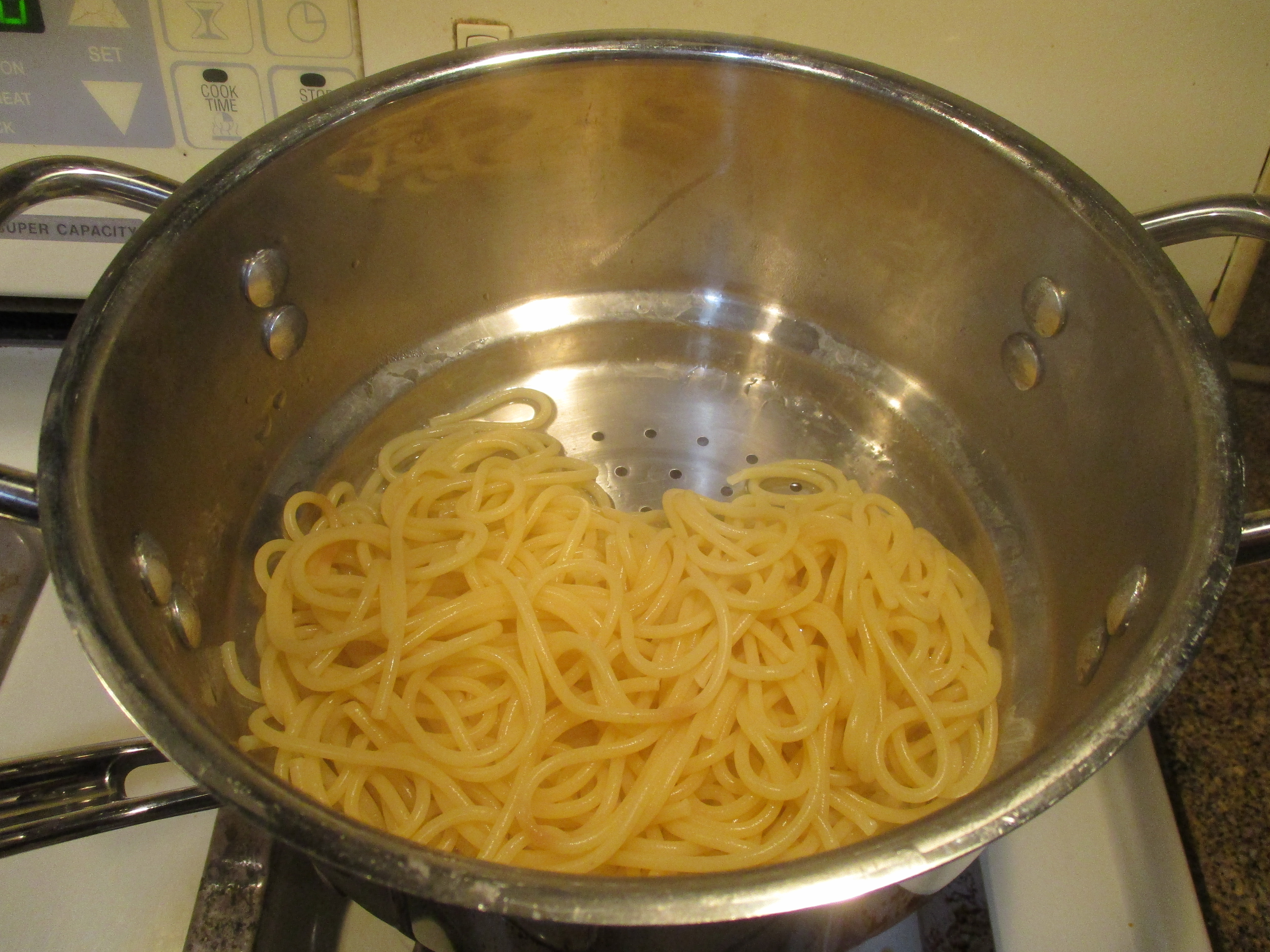
Draining the water

== Serving ==
An emblem of Italian cuisine, spaghetti is frequently served with tomato sauce, which may contain various herbs (especially oregano and basil), olive oil, meat or vegetables. Other spaghetti preparations include amatriciana or carbonara. Grated hard cheeses, such as pecorino romano, Parmesan, and Grana Padano, are often sprinkled on top.

Spaghetti dishes

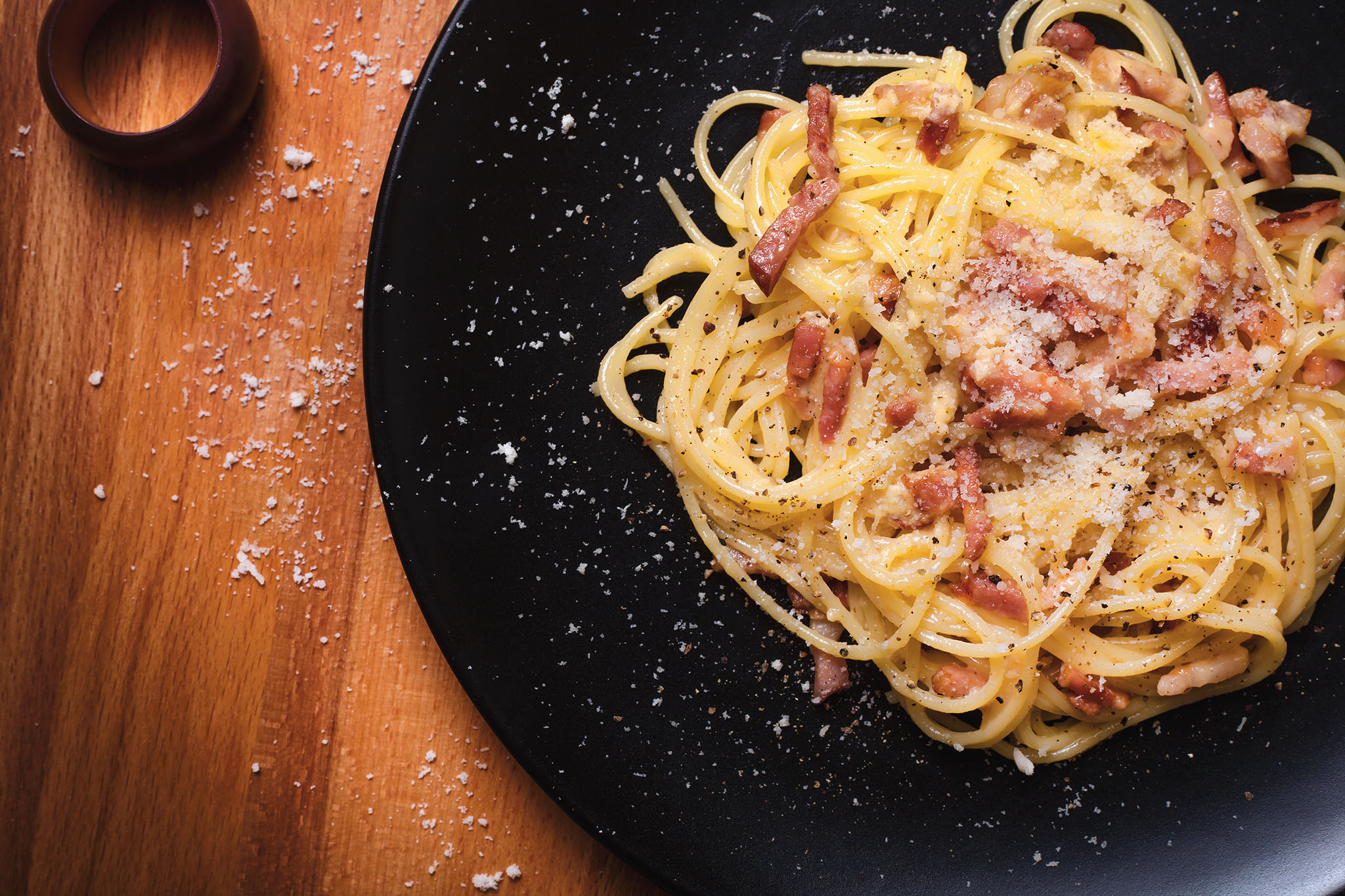
Spaghetti alla carbonara

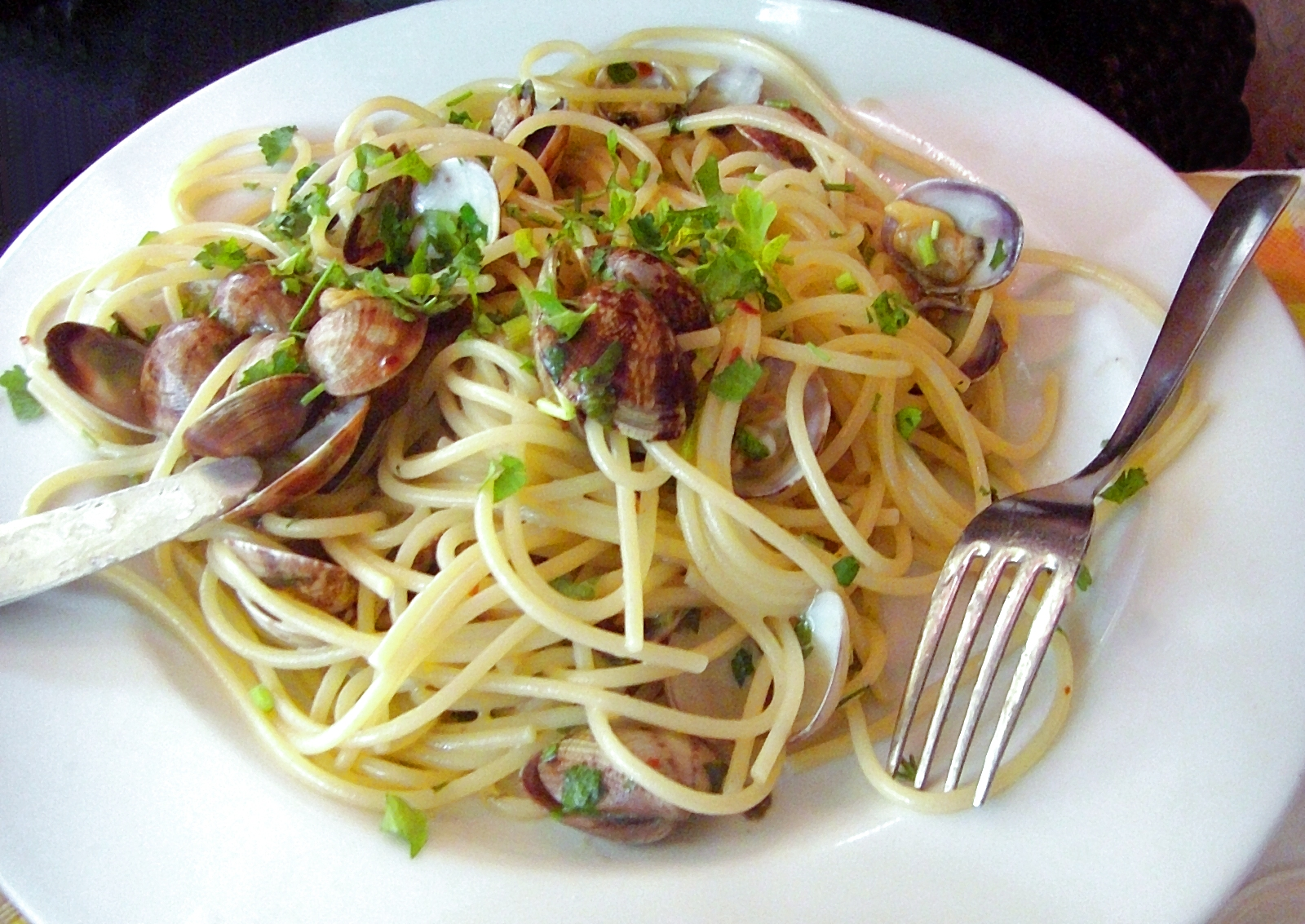
Spaghetti alle vongole

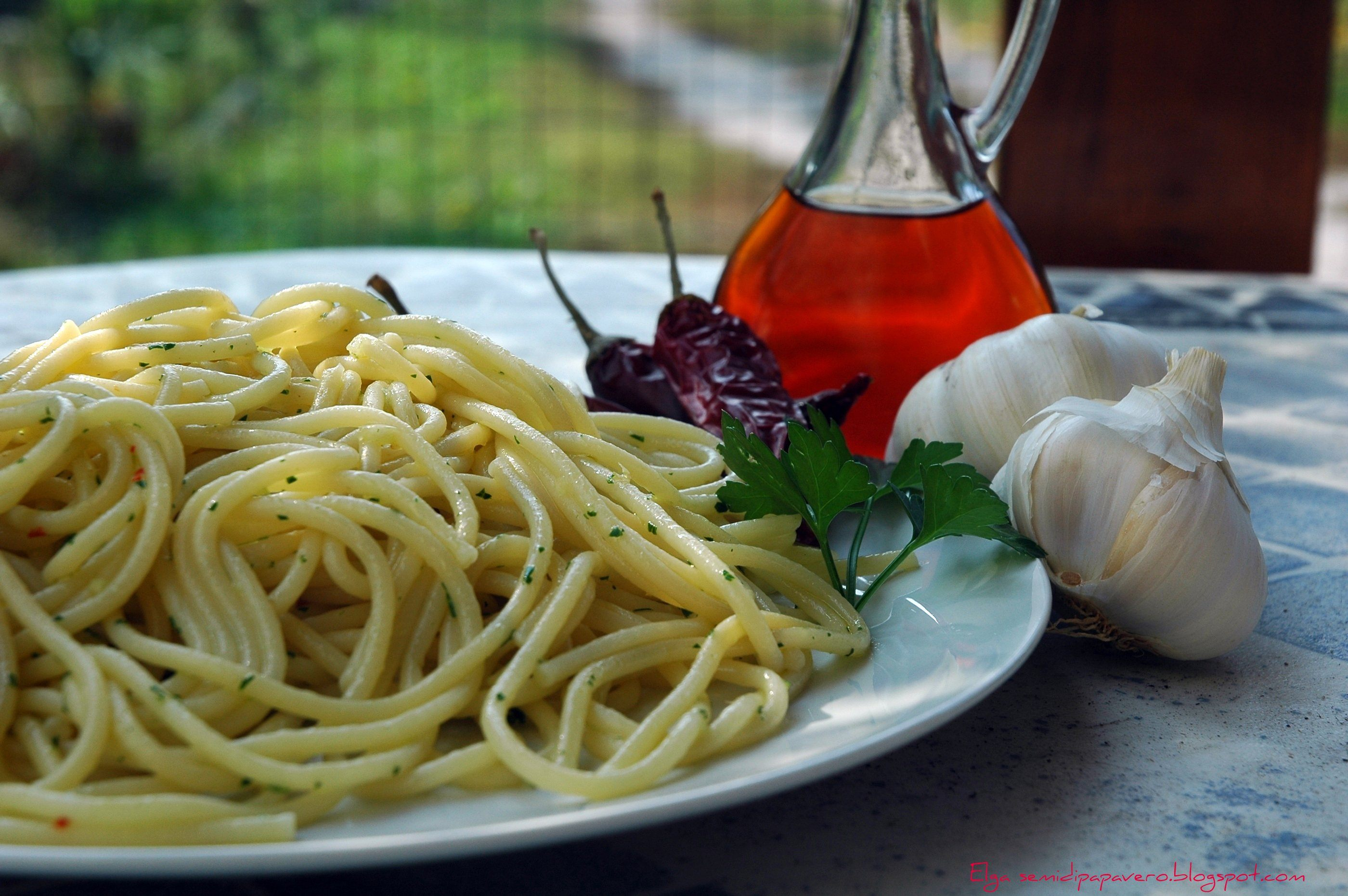
Spaghetti aglio e olio

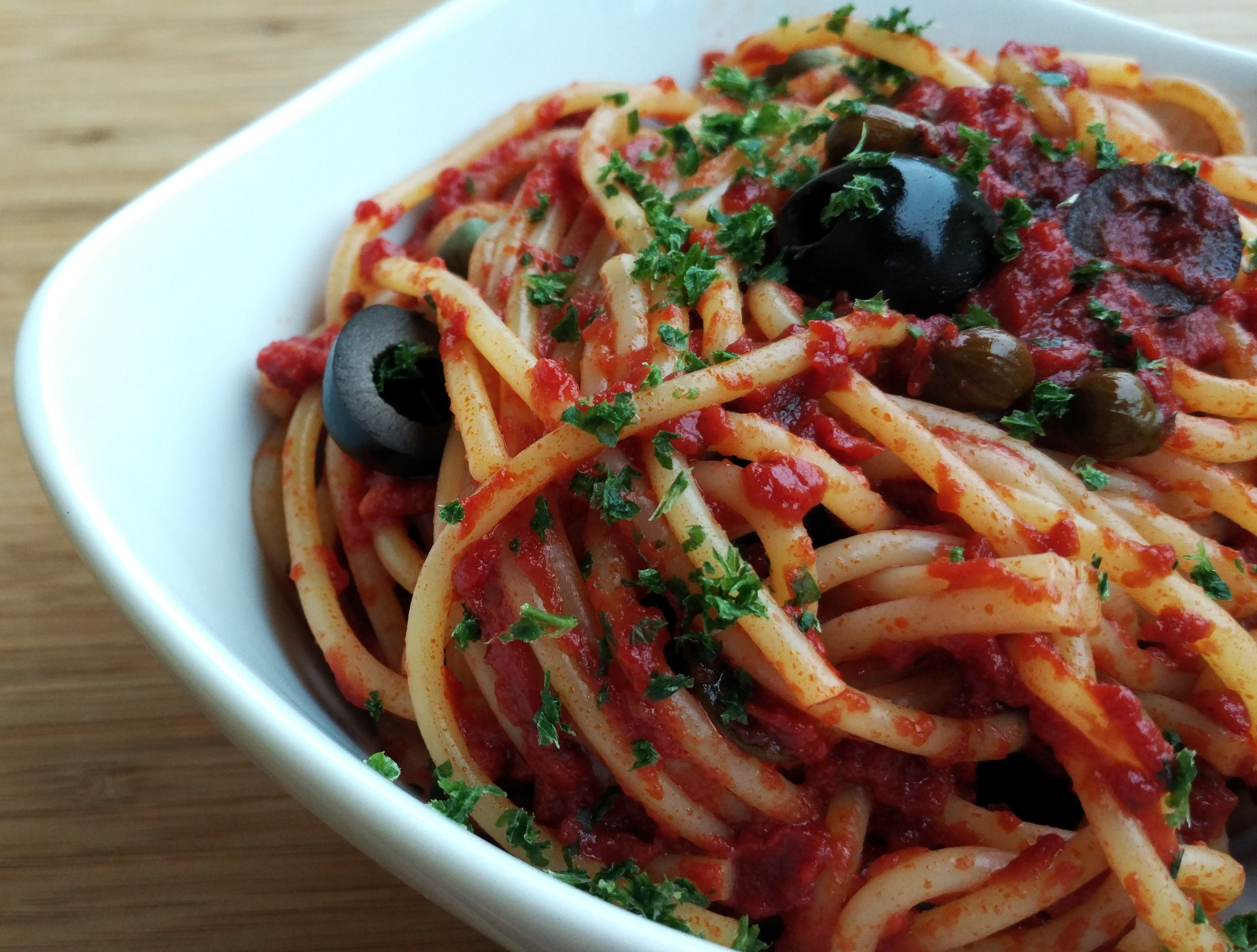
Spaghetti alla puttanesca

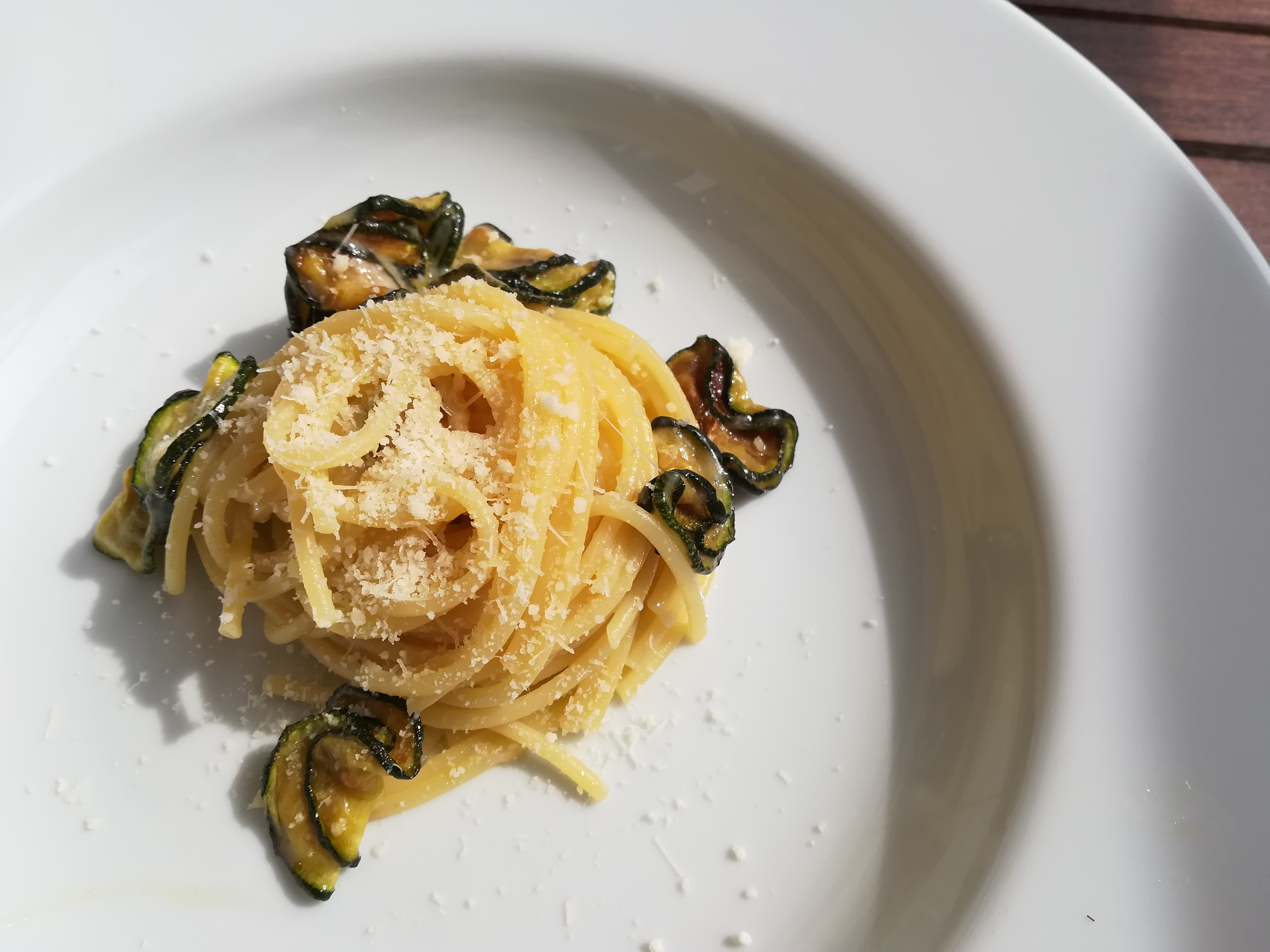
Spaghetti alla Nerano

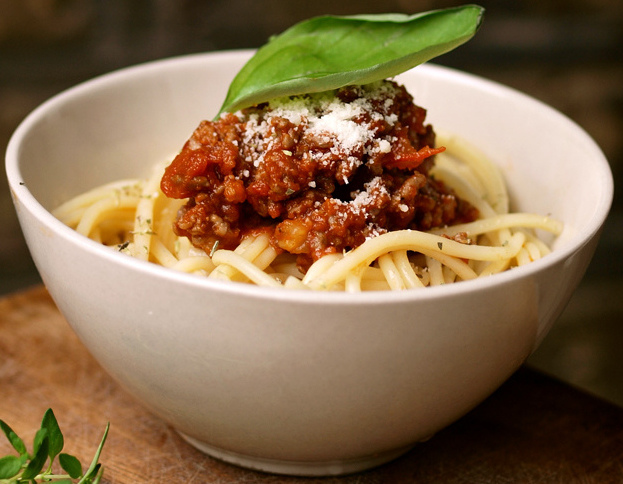
Spaghetti bolognese, common outside of Italy

== In popular culture ==
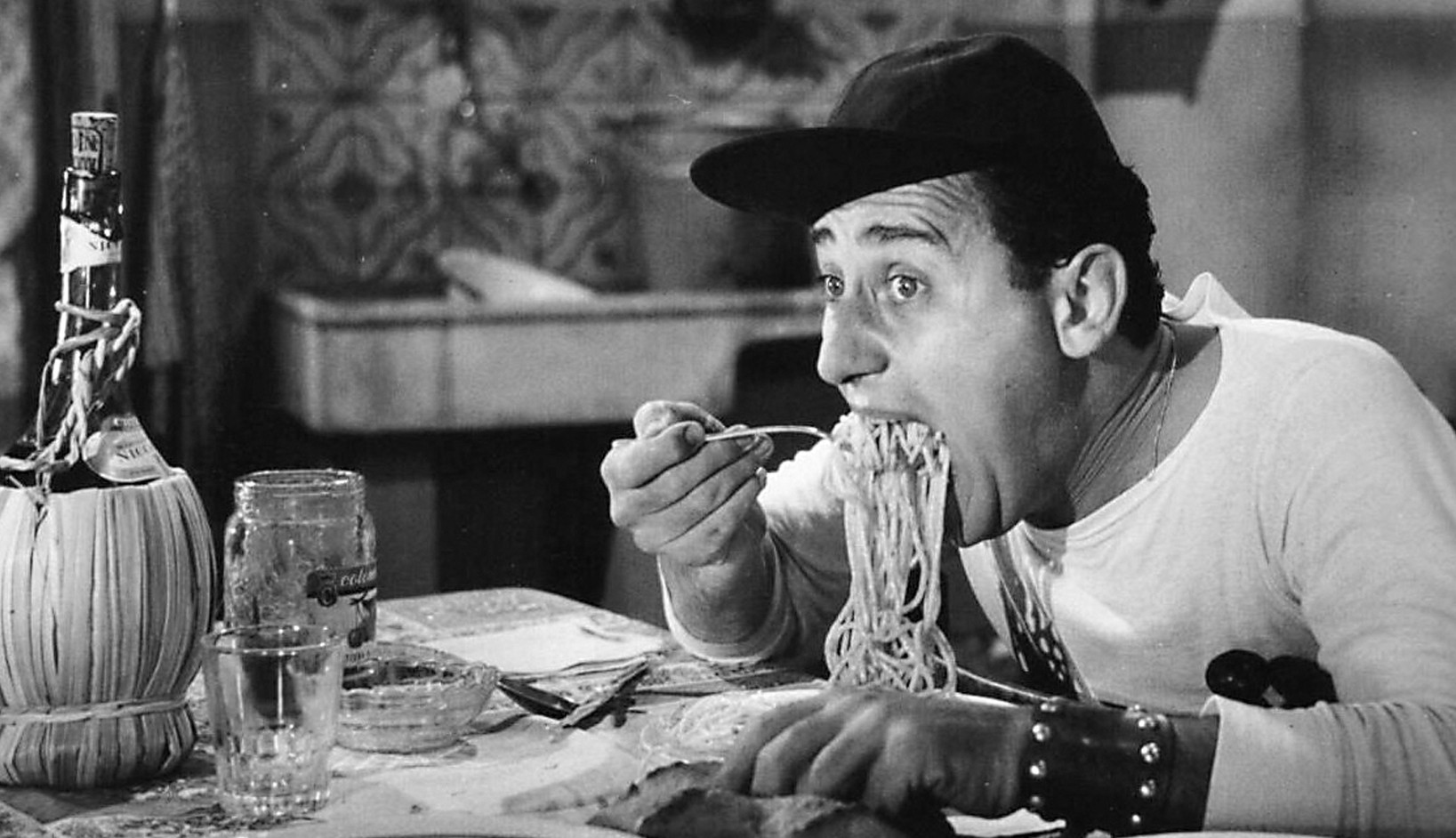
Alberto Sordi eating spaghetti in An American in Rome (1954).

In a humorous scene in the 1931 silent film City Lights, Charlie Chaplin tries to eat an extremely long spaghetti in a restaurant. A sequence in the 1955 animated film Lady and the Tramp features the title characters sharing a plate of spaghetti, culminating in an accidental kiss as they meet, eating the same strand of spaghetti. It is considered an iconic scene in American film history. The BBC television program Panorama featured a hoax program about the spaghetti harvest in Switzerland on April Fools' Day in 1957.

Poorly structured computer source code is often described as spaghetti code. A similar and more physical concept, "cable spaghetti", applies to poor cable management. In women's clothing, very thin straps supporting a dress or topwear are called "spaghetti straps". The term spaghetti Western refers to Western films made in Europe that were produced and directed by Italians.

There is a very common folk belief that says that when you break a piece of spaghetti, an Italian person dies.

== See also ==
- List of pasta

== Sources ==
- Montanari, Massimo (2013). Italian Identity in the Kitchen, or Food and the Nation. Translated by Brombert, Beth Archer (English ed.). Chichester, West Sussex: Columbia University Press. ISBN 978-0-231-53508-3.
- Montanari, Massimo (2021) [2019 (in Italian)]. A Short History of Spaghetti with Tomato Sauce. Translated by Conti, Gregory. London: Europa Editions. ISBN 978-1-78770-328-5.
- Root, Waverley (1968). The Cooking of Italy. Time-Life Books.
- Serventi, Silvano; Sabban, Françoise [in French] (2002) [2000 (in Italian)]. Pasta: The Story of a Universal Food. Translated by Shugaar, Antony. New York: Columbia University Press. ISBN 978-0-231-12442-3.
