= Food & History =

- Discipline: Food science
- Language: English
- Edited by: Peter Scholliers, Allen Grieco

Publication details
- History: 2003–present
- Publisher: Brepols Publishers
- Frequency: Biannually

Standard abbreviations
- ISO 4: Food Hist.

Indexing
- ISSN: 1780-3187 (print); 2034-2101 (web)

Links
- Journal homepage

Food & History is a multilingual (French, English) scientific journal that is published since 2003. It is the biannual scientific review of the European Institute for the History and Cultures of Food (IEHCA) based in Tours. It publishes papers about the history and culture of food.

== The review ==
Food & History is the biannual scientific review of the Institut Européen d'Histoire et des Cultures de l'Alimentation / European Institute for the History and Culture of Food (IEHCA) in Tours, France. Founded by Francis Chevrier, director of IEHCA, in 2003, it is the first journal in Europe, both in its vocation and concept, specialised in the specific field of food history. It aims at presenting, promoting and diffusing research that focuses on food from an historical and/or cultural perspective. The journal studies food history, food archaeology, foodways and food culture from different points of view. It embraces social, economic, religious, political, agronomical and cultural aspects of food and nutrition. It deals at the same time with questions of food consumption, production and distribution, with alimentation theories and practices (medical aspects included), with food-related paraphernalia and infrastructures, as well as with culinary practices, gastronomy and restaurants. Being positioned at the crossroads of the humanities and social sciences, the review deliberately promotes interdisciplinary research approaches. Although most contributions are concerned with European food history, the journal principally also welcomes articles on other food cultures.

Food & History is a fully-fledged academic journal which applies the usual methodical instruments for assessing incoming articles, i.e. a double-blind reviewing process by external referees, recruited from a large and ever-growing intercontinental pool of experts in the field of social and cultural food studies. It belongs to a decreasing spectrum of journals which openly expresses its European and international character by accepting manuscripts in two European languages: English and French.

Food & History gains official recognition from the Institut des Sciences Humaines et Sociales of the CNRS (Centre National de la Recherche Scientifique) and is indexed by the European Reference Index for the Humanities (ERIH) of the European Science Foundation (History category B).

Food & History is published thanks to the financial support from the Ministère de l'Education nationale, Ministère de l'enseignement supérieur et de la recherche, Université François-Rabelais de Tours, and the Conseil Régional du Centre.

== History ==
Food and History was created by a network of academic researchers and students, with the help of the French Ministry for National Education and the University of Tours. The journal is sustained by the French National Center for Scientific Research (CNRS) and is cited by the European Science Foundation in its European Reference Index for the Humanities (ERIH).

The launch of Food & History was on the one hand a logical fruit of the foundation of the European Institute for the History of Food in December 2000 in Strasbourg (redefined in 2005 as European Institute for the History and Culture of Food), and on the other hand a clear manifestation of the gradual breakthrough of social and cultural food studies as an independent field of research during the first decades of the 21st century. The emergence of this sub-discipline had, of course, been anticipated in an impressive record of food-related research, conducted by scholars from adjacent fields, such as e.g. economic history, agricultural history, history of the body etc. However, the scholars behind these pioneering works were generally operating on a rather individual base and they would not have defined themselves as food historians. It was only with the foundation of the journal Food and Foodways in 1986 and of the International Commission for Research into European Food History (ICFREH) by Hans-Jürgen Teuteberg in Münster 1989 that a first infrastructural framework for social and cultural food studies was provided. In the decades around the turn of the century, a lot of new food-related research initiatives became visible, thus demonstrating the vitality of this research area. In 1997, the Department of History at the University of Adelaide established a Research Centre for the History of Food and Drink. In 2001, a new web-journal The Anthropology of Food was launched and in 2004 the American Association for the Study of Food and Society re-launched a journal, entitled Food, Culture and Society.

Around the turn of the century, due to – among other things – new appointments in the editorial board, the research interest of the journal Food and Foodways changed in a two respects: on the one hand "it shifted away from familiar disciplines (history, sociology, ethnology) toward 'unexpected' ones (communication sciences, linguistics, tourism)", on the other hand it became increasingly dominated by Anglo-Saxon input, especially from scholars from the US, whereas the influence of the traditional French research schools significantly diminished. Some scholars argue that this "exotic" publication strategy of Food and Foodways may have led to the launch of the new food history journal Food & History.

Be that as it may, it was from the very start of the European Institute for the History of Food obvious that this new Europe-wide food research initiative should be accordingly accompanied by the launch of a new publication platform. And so happened: three years after its foundation, the IEHA announced the introduction of a new journal, Food & History, which still appears under the aegis of IEHCA, represented by its director Francis Chevrier (series editor). It started with a 7-person board, consisting of four historians, sinologist, sociologist and Secretary Christophe Marion. As from volume 4.2 (publication year 2006), the editorial board was almost doubled, with the addition of a philologist, archaeologist, classicist, and three historians.

After a transitional period and the appointment of a new secretary in 2007, the journal has been increasingly professionalized, for instance by the introduction of a new uniform style sheet (link) and by the application of a comprehensive peer-reviewing system (starting with volume 5.1). These assessments are usually carried out on an entirely honorary base. However, by way of acknowledgement, the names of external referees are regularly published, usually in the last issue of each volume.

Another development that bears witness of the increasing professionalisation of the journal was the change in its direction. During the initial period, Massimo Montanari had served as editor in chief, but in 2008 the editorial board declared itself openly in favour of a new dual leading structure, which rotates among the board members, giving each tandem a triennial turn (which is once renewable for another turn of three years). During a transitional year (2009), Montanari was accompanied by Allen Grieco and Peter Scholliers, who in the subsequent year took over the torch of the journals direction.

Yet another step towards further professionalization was the introduction of a group of corresponding members as from 2010, with the aim to represent the journal's interests in different world regions and to establish a permanent flow of food research related information between these regions and the journal's "headquarters".

== Editorial board ==
=== Chief editors ===
==== Since 2009 ====
- Peter Scholliers, (Vrije Universiteit Brussel),
- Allen J. Grieco (Harvard University Center for Italian Renaissances Studies, Florence)

==== 2003-2009 ====
- Massimo Montanari, (Università degli Studi di Bologna)

=== Members of editorial board ===
- Karin Becker (Westfälische Wilhelms-Universität Münster);
- Florent Quellier, Université d'Angers
- Marie-Pierre Ruas (CNRS Muséum d'histoire naturelle, Paris);
- Françoise Sabban (Ecole des Hautes Etudes en Sciences Sociales, Paris)
- David Gentilcore (University of Venice, IT)
- Rachel Rich (Leeds Metropolitan University)
- Rengenier Rittersma (Rotterdam Business School)
- Secretary of the Editorial Board: Lucinda Byatt (Edinburgh) and Marianne Brisville (Lyon)
- Book Review Editor: David Gentilcore (University of Venice)
- Assistant to the Editorial Board: Kilien Stengel (IEHCA, Université de Tours)
- Previous Board Members: Manuela Marin (Consejo Superior de Investigaciones Cientificas, Madrid; 2003–2007), Christophe Marion, (IEHCA Tours; Secretary 2003–2006, vol. 4.1), Stephen Mennell (University College Dublin 2003–2013), Marika Galli (université de Franche-Comté 2007–2010), John Wilkins (Exeter University), Henri Notaker (Independent researcher), Antoni Riera Melis (Universitat de Barcelona), Massimo Montanari (Università di Bologna)
- Corresponding Members : Wanessa Asfora (Centro Universitário Senac São Paulo), Kyri Claflin (Boston University), Roger Haden ( Le Cordon Bleu, Adelaide), Helena Jarošová (Univerzity Karlovy Praha), Joji Nozawa (Panthéon-Sorbonne Paris / Suntory Foundation Japan), Özge Samanci (Yeditepe Üniversitesi Istanbul)

== See also ==
- List of food and drink magazines
