= Montanaro (surname) =

Montanaro is a locational surname of Italian origin, meaning a person from Montanaro, Italy. Notable people with the surname include:

- Anna Montanaro (born 1973), German actress
- Donato A. Montanaro (born 1962), American businessman
- José Montanaro (born 1958), Brazilian volleyball player
- Sabino Augusto Montanaro (1922–2011), Paraguayan politician
- Tony Montanaro (1927–2002), American mime artist

== See also ==
- Montanaro, Italy
