= Spaghetti aglio e olio =

Italian pasta dish

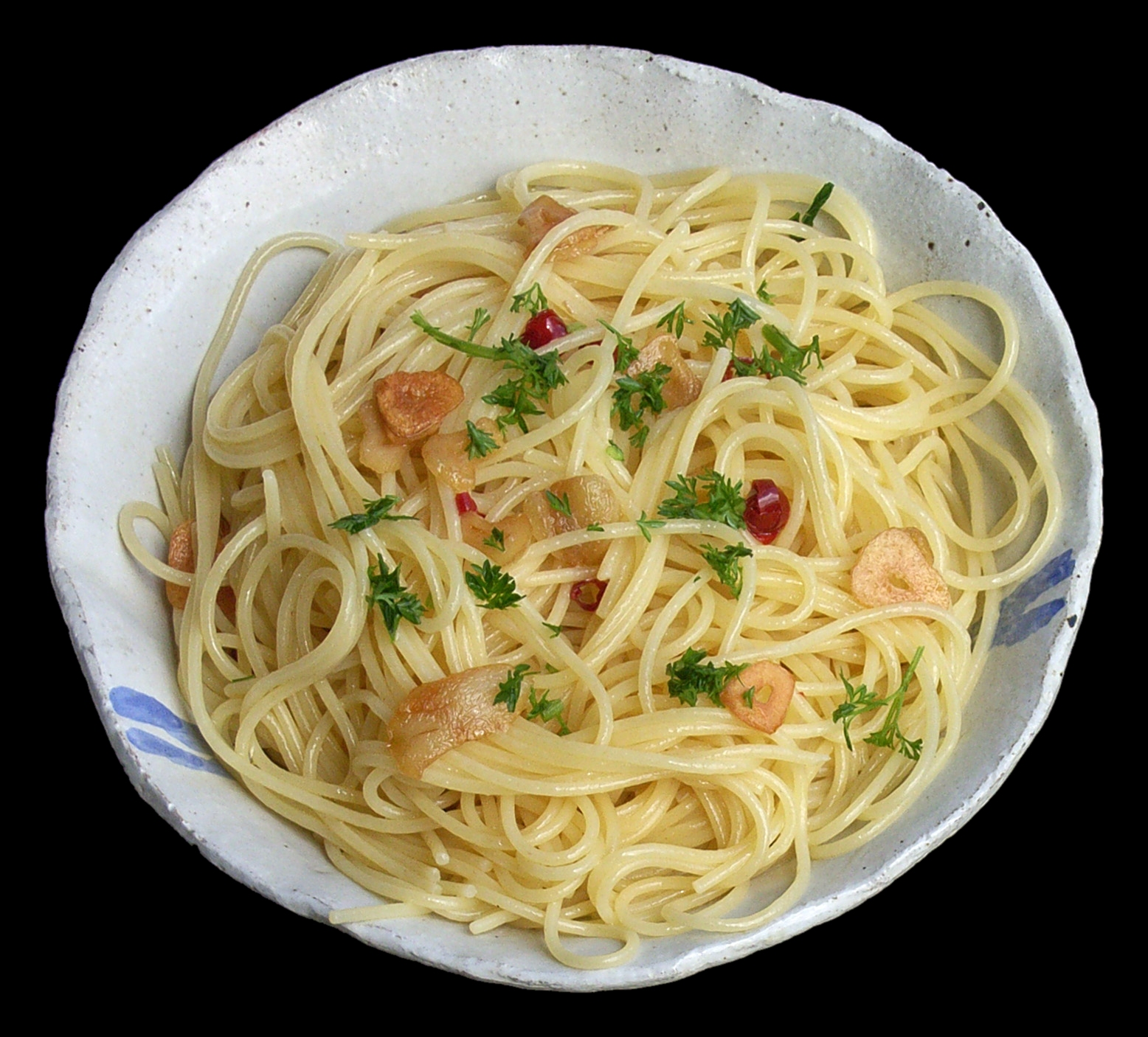
- Spaghetti aglio, olio e peperoncino
- Course: Primo (Italian course)
- Place of origin: Italy
- Region or state: Campania
- Main ingredients: Spaghetti, garlic, extra virgin olive oil, parsley, chili flakes
- Variations: Spaghetti aglio, olio e peperoncino (with chili pepper)
Nutritional value
(per serving)
- Protein: -- g
- Fat: 20% g
- Carbohydrate: 80% g

Spaghetti aglio e olio (Italian: [spaˈɡetti ˈaʎʎo e ˈɔːljo]; lit. 'spaghetti with garlic and [olive] oil') is a pasta dish typical of the city of Naples, Italy. It is popular because it is simple to prepare and makes use of inexpensive, readily available ingredients that have long shelf lives in a pantry.

The dish was once also known as vermicelli alla Borbonica.

== Preparation ==
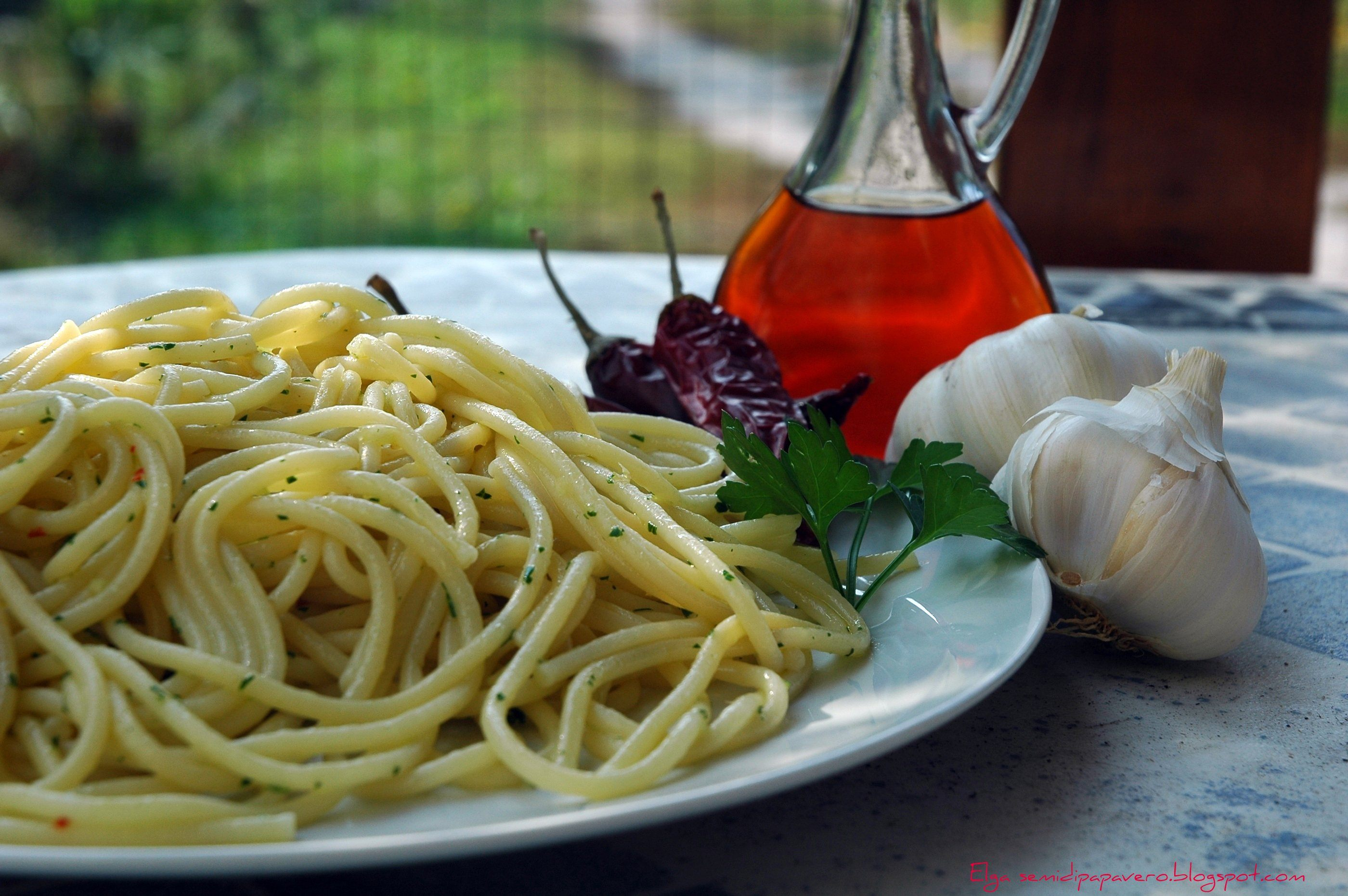
Spaghetti aglio e olio

The dish is made by first lightly sautéing thinly sliced garlic in extra virgin olive oil, sometimes with the addition of either red pepper flakes (spaghetti aglio, olio e peperoncino) or mushrooms (spaghetti aglio, olio e funghi). The oil and garlic are then tossed with spaghetti that has been cooked in salted water. Finely chopped Italian parsley is then commonly added as a garnish.

Although cheese is not included in most traditional recipes, grated Parmesan or pecorino can be added, similarly to pasta allo scarpariello. Some recipes recommend adding some of the water from cooking pasta to the olive oil to create a sauce, but other recipes recommend simply stirring the oil into the drained pasta.

== See also ==
- List of pasta
- List of pasta dishes

== Bibliography ==
- Zanini De Vita, Oretta; Fant, Maureen B. (2013). Sauces & Shapes: Pasta the Italian Way. New York: W. W. Norton & Company. ISBN 978-0-393-08243-2.
