= Montanaro Castle =

Castle in Piedmont, Italy

- Castello di Montanaro
- Montanaro, Piedmont, Italy
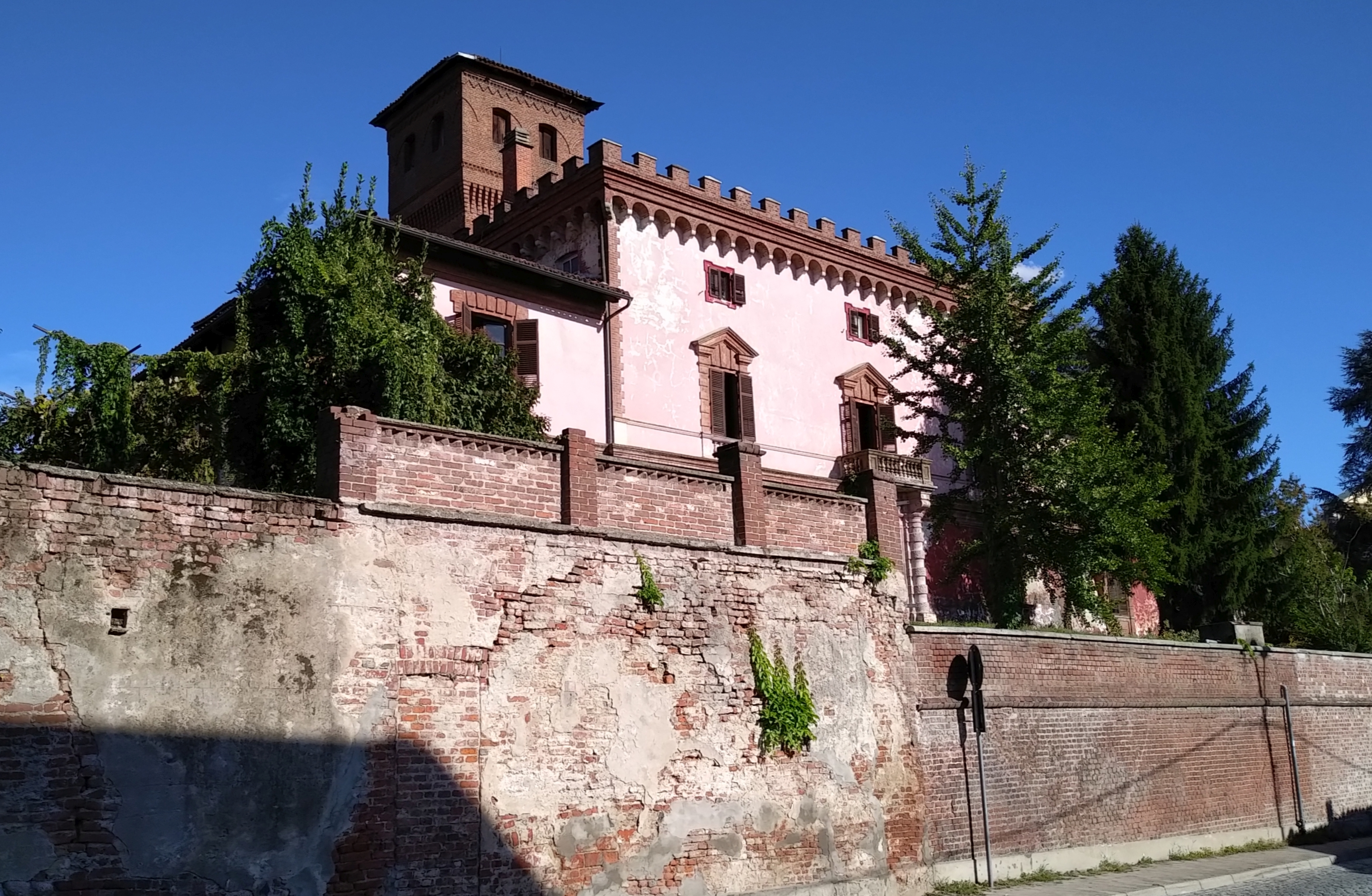
- Montanaro Castle in 2020

Site information
- Type: Castle

Location
- Coordinates: 45°14′03.37″N 7°51′05.62″E

Montanaro Castle (Italian: Castello di Montanaro) is a castle located in Montanaro, Piedmont, Italy.

== History ==
The building is documented in the 13th century in the deed of sale by which the Counts of Orio transferred their properties to Fruttuaria Abbey. In 1515, it was partially destroyed by French troops.

During the 16th century, the castle was transformed into a Renaissance residence at the initiative of the then commendatory abbot of Fruttuaria, Cardinal Bonifacio Ferrero. The abbot was granted the privilege of minting coins by Pope Clement VII in 1527 and installed a mint in one wing of the castle.

== Gallery ==
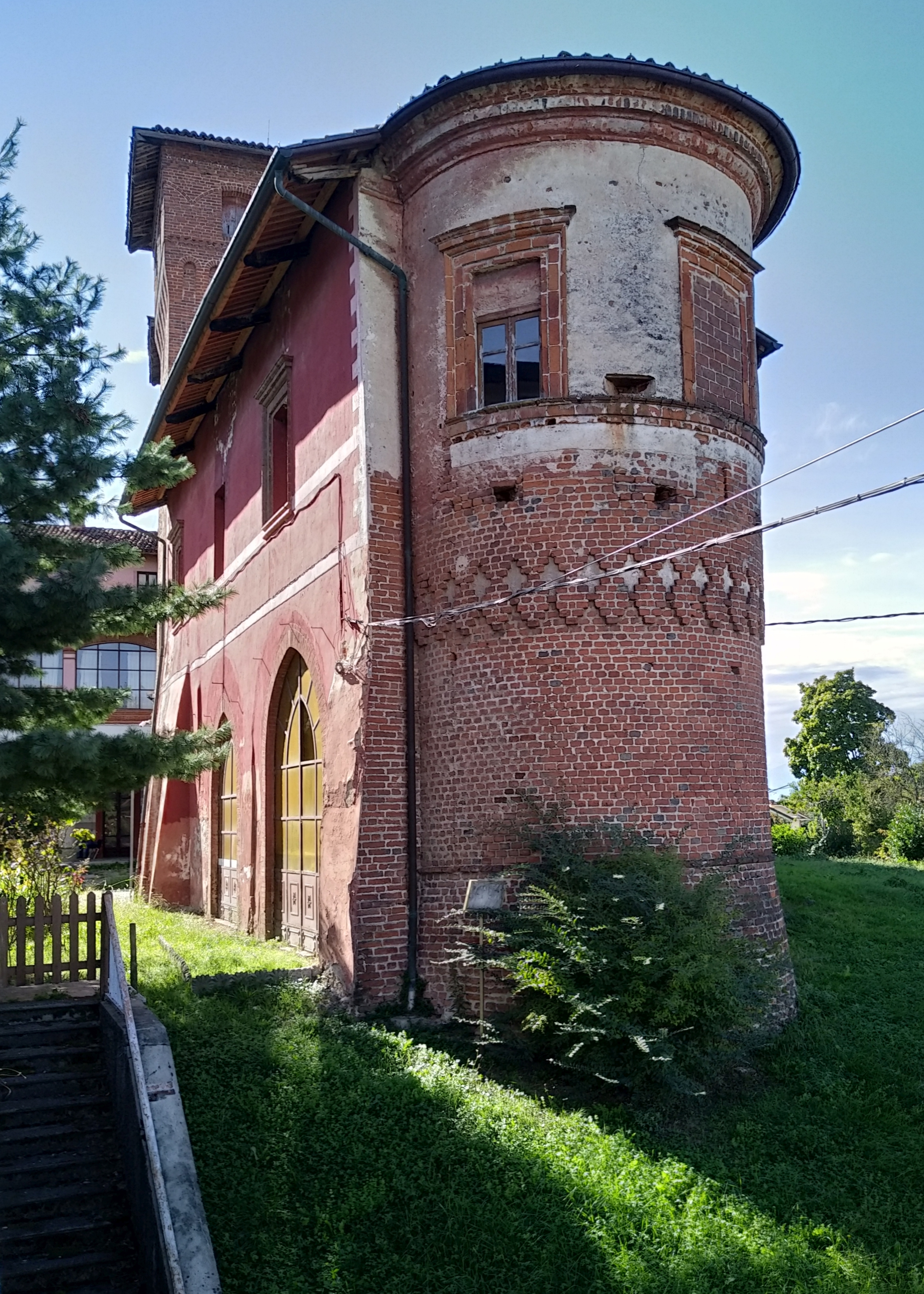

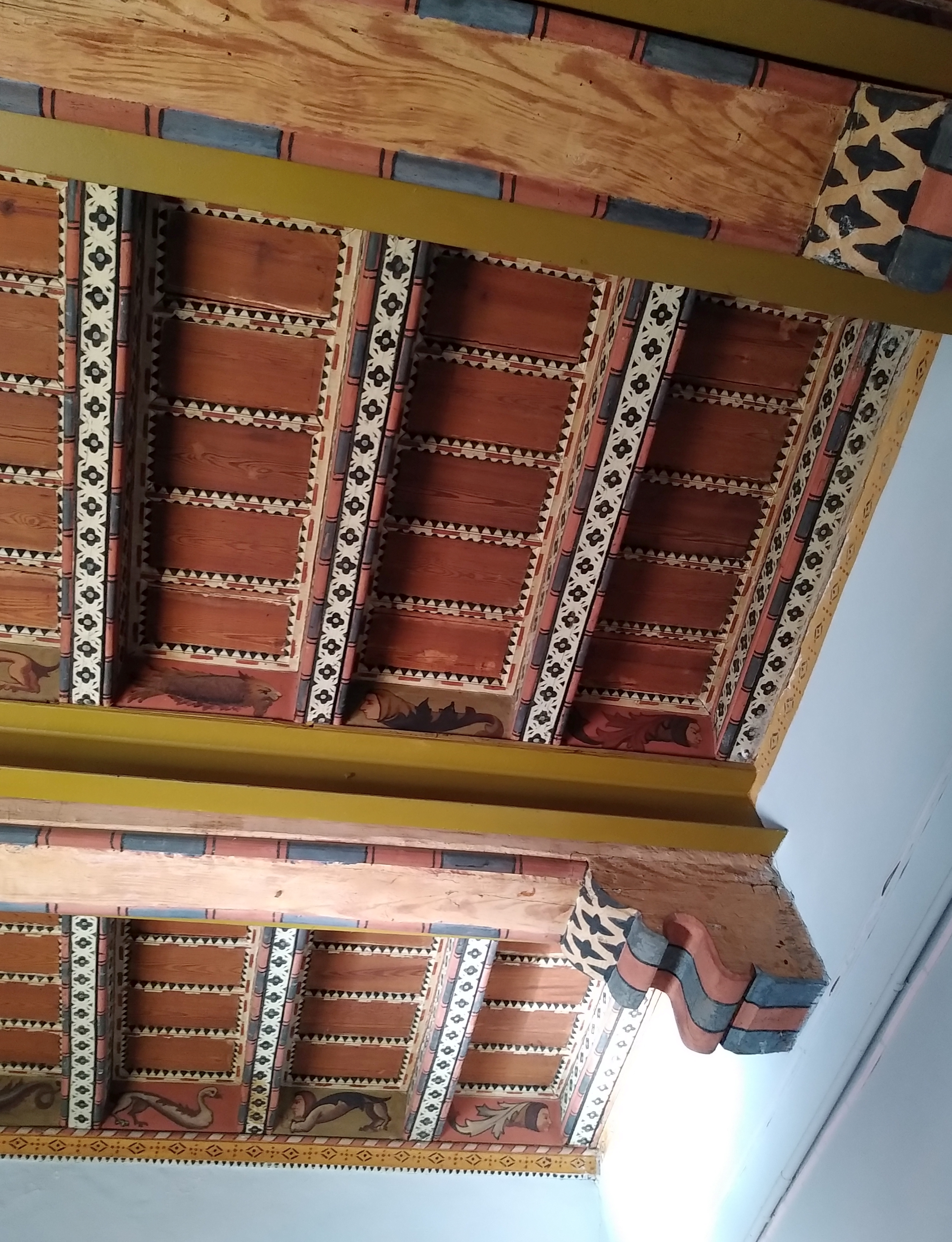

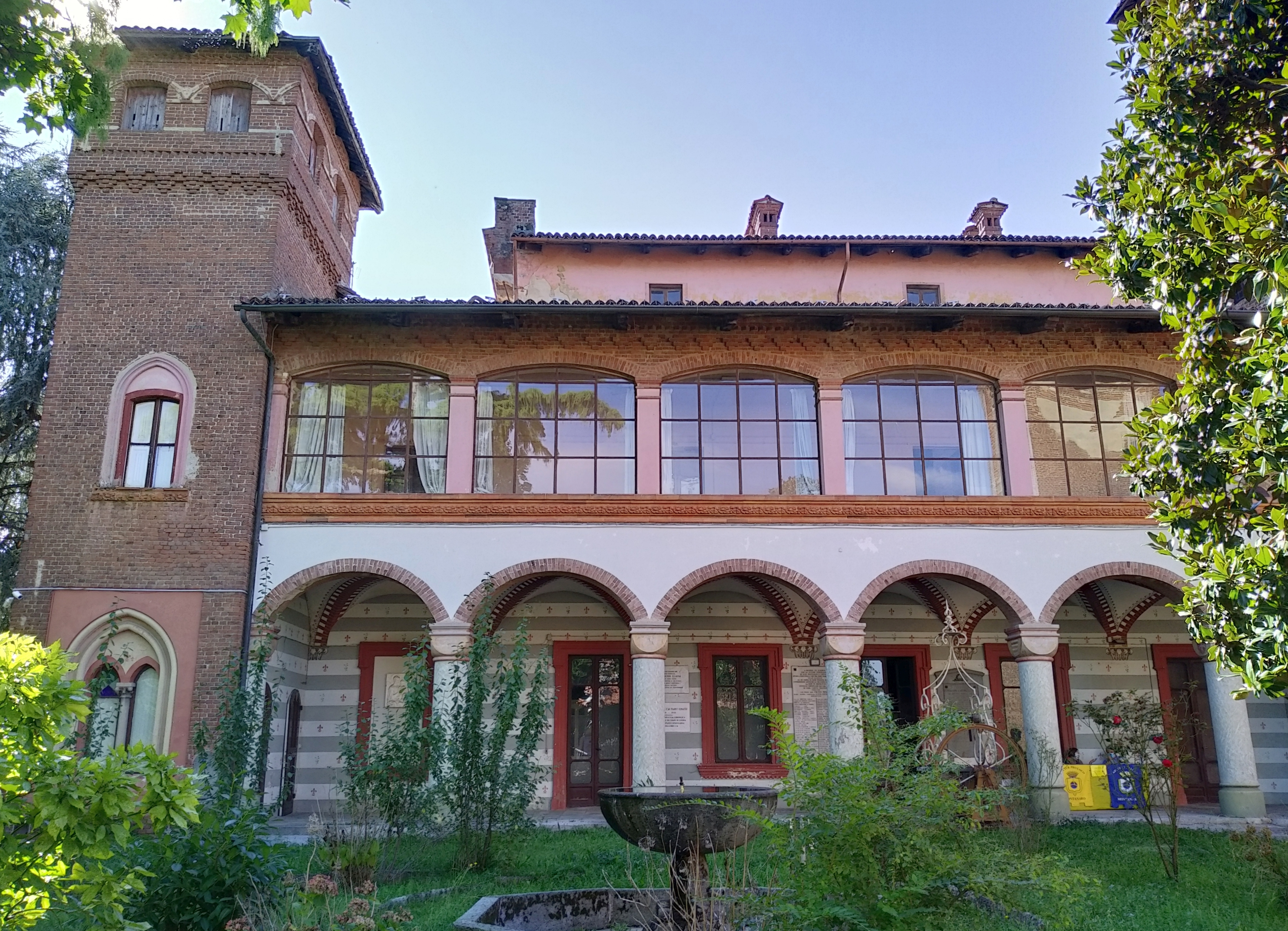
