= Al dente =

Cooking method

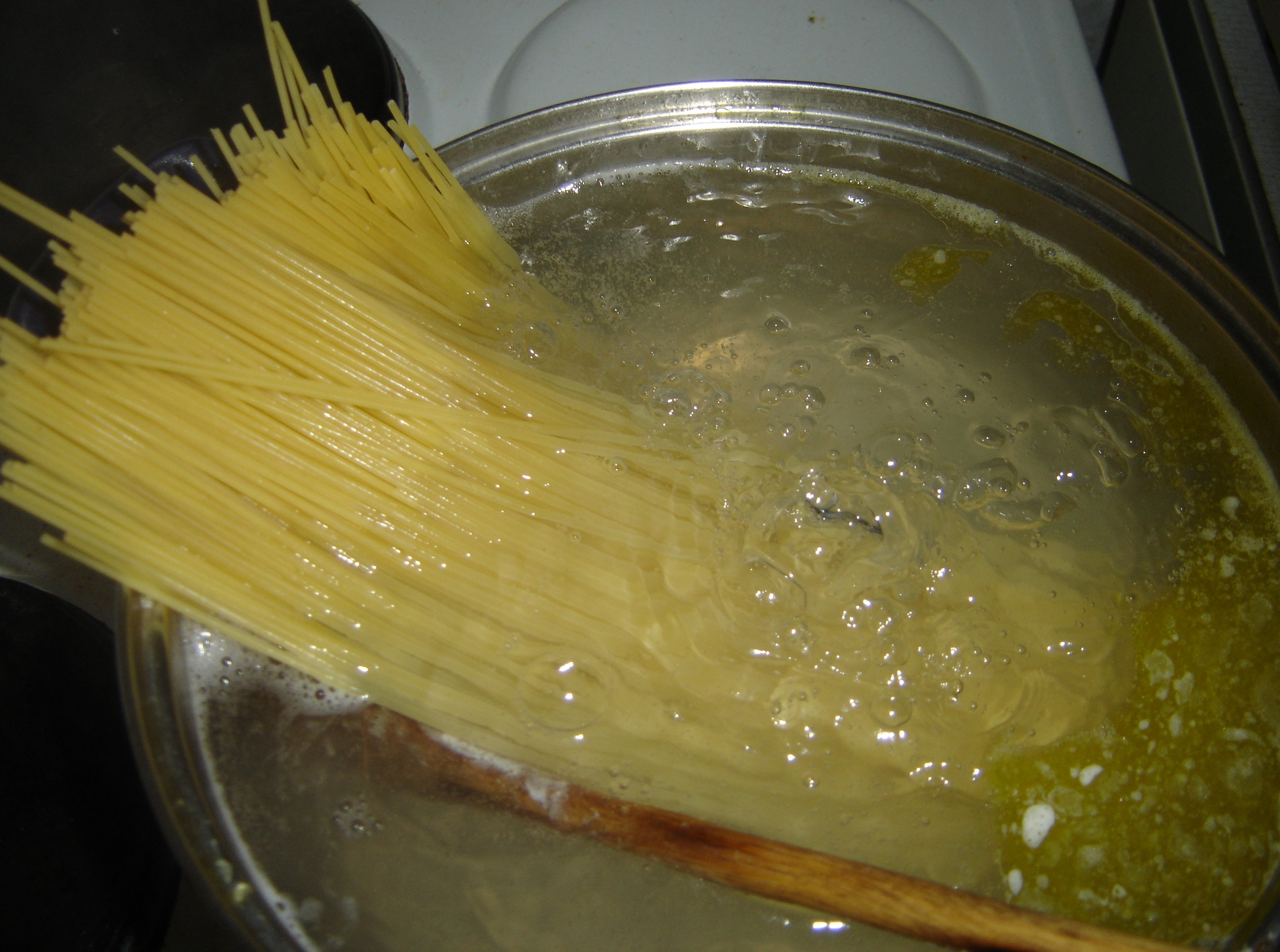
A pot of cooking spaghetti

In Italian cooking, pasta or risotto is cooked in a brief cooking time until they are firm when bitten or al dente (/ælˈdɛnteɪ/, Italian: [al ˈdɛnte]; lit. 'to the tooth'). The term also extends to firmly-cooked vegetables. The state is considered the ideal consistency for pasta, it cannot be overcooked. Molto al dente is the Italian term for slightly undercooked pasta.

When cooking commercial pasta, the al dente phase occurs right before the white of the pasta center disappears. The American Diabetes Association says that al dente pasta has a lower glycemic index than pasta that is cooked soft.

For centuries in Italy, the ideal pasta was very soft, and chefs such as the 15th century chef Martino da Como recommended cooking pasta for hours to achieve the desired texture. The resulting pasta's softness influenced how it was served. At the time, the leading physicians of Italy followed Hippocrates and Galen, who maintained contraria contrariis curantur ('opposites cure opposites'). As a result, they recommended pasta be served with dried spices and pepper, as well as cheese, particularly the dry, aged varieties. As pasta was slippery when eaten with the hands, historian Massimo Montanari credits this with promoting the use of forks.

Records of pasta being cooked for a shorter time start in 17th century Naples. At first, this was restricted to fresh pasta. It was not until the mid-19th century that a short cooktime and firm texture became the norm for all pastas. Despite this development, the term al dente was not yet used. Historians Silvano Serventi and Françoise Sabban write that before World War I, the term was unknown. In the years since, the idea of cooking pasta al dente became part of Italian national identity. Internationally, the phrase spread through restaurants in the second half of the 20th century.

== See also ==
- Culinary arts
- Food science
- Molecular gastronomy
- Q texture

== Sources ==
- Montanari, Massimo (2021) [2019 (in Italian)]. A Short History of Spaghetti with Tomato Sauce. Translated by Conti, Gregory. London: Europa Editions. ISBN 978-1-78770-328-5.
- Serventi, Silvano; Sabban, Françoise [in French] (2002) [2000 (in Italian)]. Pasta: The Story of a Universal Food. Translated by Shugaar, Antony. New York: Columbia University Press. ISBN 978-0-231-12442-3.
