= Roberto Montanari =

Italian painter (1937–2017)

Roberto Montanari (Ravenna, July 19, 1937 – Vicenza, August 10, 2017) was an Italian painter. Known as “El Pintor de Los Toros,” he painted mostly Spanish bulls and landscapes and was a pupil of Salvador Dalí. He held over 300 exhibitions. In 1970, 1971, and 1972, he exhibited with Pablo Picasso and Salvador Dalì.

He is included in the cultural heritage of Emilia-Romagna and Italy and has pictures in several museums, such as Pinacoteca comunale di Faenza, the Casa Giorgione, Castelfranco Veneto, and the Gallery of Contemporary Figurative Arts in the Vatican.

== Early life and education ==
Roberto Montanari was born on July 19, 1937, in Ravenna, Italy.

After the Academy of Fine Arts of Ravenna in the early Sixties, he traveled to France to study the Impressionists. However, he remained fascinated by the Spanish painters of the twentieth century, especially Picasso, Mirò, and Dalì. For this reason, he moved to Madrid, where he studied at the Academy of Fine Arts and met Salvador Dalì, for whom he held a lifelong admiration. He also met the bullfighter Gitanillo de Triana II, who, captivated by Montanari's drawings of bulls, named him “El Pintor de Los Toros."

== Career ==
After a few years, he came back to Italy and married a fellow academy student, Margherita, in Bologna. In 1967 they moved to Ravenna where they opened an art gallery that they called "The Cathedral" and the gallery also had several other painters beside Montanari.

In those following years Roberto Montanari also began to hang out with friends such as the writer Pier Paolo Pasolini, the painter Antonio Barrera and other intellectuals of the time.

A few years later Montanari moved to Vicenza, the city of the architect Andrea Palladio. He received help from his friend Hector Puricelli who in those years coached the Lanerossi Vicenza.

In 1972 he opened up another art gallery, this time by himself, which he called "El Matador", where it was placed a plaque in his memory and which became the cultural center of the city, since he periodically organized meetings with always different characters to connect art with sport, music, theater and cinema.

It is in one of these occasions that Montanari's friend and a film director, Sergio Leone, stated that he was going to shoot the movie “Once upon a time in America.”

In 1976 the weekly magazine "Oggi" asked Roberto Montanari to do what would be the last interview of the Italian press to Salvador Dalí, who in those years was rarely interviewed. "El Pintor de los Toros” accepted but on the condition that he was a journalist friend of his and not an art critic to do the interrogation and for this reason a different and informal report was made of Dalí. The Weekly "Oggi" thanked Montanari in public.

In Vicenza he met the painter Virgilio Guidi with whom he had a strong intellectual friendship and who came to define Roberto Montanari "the painter of bulls and light,” outside the existing categories but within the great surface of expressive possibilities.”

In the Eighties he continued his activity with several exhibitions and he met other painters, such as Franco Gentilini, Domenico Purificato, Pietro Annigoni and Ernesto Treccani and Roberto Sebastián Matta. Some of them also participated in charities organized by Montanari himself to restore ancient monuments, to help earthquake victims, the poor, Chernobyl children etc.

In 1981 Roberto Montanari suffered a brain tumor that was damaging his eyesight and he was operated and after several therapies he painted again and from 1982 to 1992 various monographies were published.

On November 20th 1985 he was invited by Pope John Paul II to which he presented the painting "La Grande Via Crucis.” He traveled to the Vatican on May 7, 1986, with the American singer James Brown and his wife Adrienne Rodríguez to deliver the oil "The Descent of Christ.” He returned a third time, on February 10, 1988, and presented to the pope the work "Virgen de Macarena" with the bullfighter Dámaso González.

In 1990, the Verona City Council invited Montanari to represent Spain in the World Cup and the painter decided to present a series of work with the title "Spain to Verona" in which he inserted Spanish subjects into Veronese landscapes.

In 2003 Montanari had a stroke that paralysed his eyes and on that occasion doctors said that he would not survive that but after several operations he rose again and started to paint again.

In 2004 he was appointed president of the Critics Commission of the Veneto Region for the academy "Antonio Canova" which he led for three years until 2007.

In 2004, on the occasion of the “Dell'Arte e del Lavoro" Award, Poste Italiane created a philatelic cancellation with a work by Roberto Montanari.

In 2008 he was elected artistic director for the "Michelangelo Buonarroti Award” in Rome "for his remarkable artistic and cultural talent".

On July 19, 2017, Roberto Montanari was invited by the mayor of Vicenza at Palazzo Trissino for a tribute and on that occasion the painter donated to his adopted city the painting "El Toro en el Encierro" of 1997.

=== Other artistic activities ===
In the second half of the Seventies Montanari used drawings of his depicting "El encierro de San Fermin" and bulls to make costumes, such as scarves, T-shirts and dresses and also curtains. In addition, in the same period he drew the firm for a fashion house of the time: "Simon.”

In the Eighties he painted crockery with the theme of the bull and made pure silk ties with drawings of Andalusian streets and flamenco dancers.

In 1994 Roberto Montanari published the monograph "110 e lode”.. Profili di Roberto Montanari “The Bulls Painter.”

== Death and legacy ==
He lived between Spain and Italy until his death on August 10, 2017, on the "Night of San Lorenzo.” It was an inexpiable death that even doctors didn't get an answer to. What is thought is that Roberto Montanari, at 80 years old, had "let" himself die because he felt unable to paint as he did once. In fact, painting was a necessity for him and he lived because his bulls lived. He used to say: «I am like the bulls I paint, I always stand up to death.”

In July 2018, after less than a year of his death, the City Council of Estepona decided to dedicate a citizen road to him.

On March 16, 2019, the Vicenza City Council organized a concert at Palazzo Chiericati in his memory with the title "A travel to Spain of painter Roberto Montanari" with a film about the life of the artist and some of his work exhibited alongside those of the Tiepolo.

Roberto Montanari is buried in the monumental cemetery of Vicenza.

== Exhibitions ==
- Italian Cultural Institute, Cologne, Germany 1970
- Art Gallery "Weirschem" Luxembourg 1970
- Gallery of "Jules Sales" Nîmes, France 1971
- Villa Cordellina Lombardi, Montecchio Maggiore, Vicenza, Italy 1982
- Museum "Casa Giorgione", Castelfranco Veneto, Treviso, Italy 1988
- Palazzina Mangani, Fiesole, Florence, Italy, 1990, contemporary art exhibition for chacas hospital, Peru
- Palazzo del Podestà, Faenza, Italy 1991
- Palazzo Piazzoni, Vittorio Veneto, Italy 1991
- Rocca Paolina, Perugia, Italy 1993
- Palazzo Datini, Prato, Italy 1995
- Municipal Museum of Albacete, Albacete, Spain 1996
- Teatro Comunale di Sogliano al Rubicone, Italy 1997
- House of Culture Benalmadena, Spain 1998
- Basilica of the Holy Apostles, Milan, Italy 1999
- Palazzo Barberini, Rome, 2004
- Forte San Gallo, Nettuno, Italy 2004
- Palacio de Congresos, Estepona, Malaga, Spain 2005
- Former Anglican Church, Alassio, Italy 2007
- Palazzo Valentini, Rome 2009, organized by Nicola Zingaretti,
- Casa Guerrini, Ravenna, Italy 2009
- Basilica Palladiana, Vicenza, Italy 2020

== Honors ==
- Italian Scholar with gold medal of the Academy of Art, Letters and Sciences, 1978
- Scholar benevolent of the Marconi Universal Academy of Rome
- Knight Order of Merit of the Italian Republic for Artistic Merit, 2009
- Academic Professor H.C. to the merit of international culture, Sovereign Order of St. John in Jerusalem Knights of Malta, International Literary Artistic Academy "City of Boretto"

== Distinctions ==
- Title of Congratulatory Point for the Participation to the Venice Biennale, 1974
- Schuberth Prize, 1974, Lazio region
- International Award "Airone d'Oro,” 1975, Recoaro Terme
- Riccione Award for the Show, 1975, Riccione
- Gold Medal for Work Merit, National Presidency A.N.I.O.C., 1975
- First Prize "Ulivo d'argento", 1979, Hera Lacinia Academy
- U.I.V.A.P. "Galileo d'Oro" International Award, 1980
- Premio "Leonardo Da Vinci" 1982
- Radio Monte Carlo Award, 1983
- Europremium, 1992
- "Citta del Palladio" Award, 1993, Vicenza
- Artist of the Year Award, 1998, Florence
- Title of Merit, 1999, U.N.C.I. (National Union Knights of Italy)
- European Personality Award, 2004, Roma Campidoglio
- "Il Cavalletto d'argento" Award, 2004, Roma Campidoglio
- Artistic Benefits Award, 2004, Florence
- "Arte e Lavoro" Award, 2004, Rome
- Croce di benemerenza con medaglia d'oro Custodia del Grifo Arciere, Latina 2004
- International Artistic Award "Antonio Canova", certificate of honor and merit, 2005
- Artist of the Year, 2005, Tuscany region
- Lifetime Achievement Award, 2007, Universal Academy "Antonio Canova", Palinuro
- "Michelangelo Buonarroti" Award, 2008, Palinuro, Salerno

== Bibliography ==
- "Enciclopedia Internazionale degli Artsti" 1970 - 71, ed. Bugatti, Universitas Europea, Ancona, Italy; Materiale documentario, Archivio Enciclopedia Internazionale degli Artisti N. 2583
- "Bolaffi Arte", N.2 Anno I, Estate 1970, Turin
- "Bolaffi Arte", N.3 Anno I Ottobre 1970, Turin
- "Catalogo nazionale d'arte moderna,” N.7, 1972, ed. Bolaffi, Turin
- "Pittori e pittura contemporanea,” 1972, ed." Il quadrato", Milan
- "Antologia Artisti of the Centennial", Pompei '72, ed." Neri Schettino"
- "Pittori scultori contemporanei dell'Emilia-Romagna,” 1974, Edi.Tur, Cervia
- "Artisti '74 Emilia-Romagna,” 1974, "Bolaffiarte: Pubblinchiesta N.23"
- "L'arte contemporanea in Emilia-Romagna, catalogo regionale d'arte moderna", 1975, ed,” Due Torri," Bologna
- "L'arte Italiana nel XX secolo,” vol.4, 1977–78, ed." Due Torri,” Bologna
- "Ver-Ars", N.2, "Annuario di attività culturali ed artistiche", 1977, ed." C.I.A.C."
- "Catalogo nazionale d'arte moderna", N.13, 1978, ed. Giulio Bolaffi, Milan
- "Catalogo nazionale d'arte moderna, rassegna 1978, notizie integrative su artisti e gallerie", 1978, ed. Giulio Bolaffi, Milano
- "novecento: profili di autori contemporanei", 1979, ed." Internazionale Ursini"
- "Catalogo nazionale dell'Antiquariato e del Collezionismo",1981, ed. Giorgio Mondadori, Milano
- "Vicenza Immagine, esperienze figurative nel territorio,” 1982, Provincia di Vicenza, Assessorato alla Cultura
- "Catalogo dell'arte moderna italiana" n. 19, 1983, ed. Giorgio Mondadori, Milano ISBN 8837409354
- "International Catalogue of Contemporary Art", 1984, ed." Alba," Ferrara
- "Arte Moderna, Catalogo dell'Arte Moderna Italiana", n. 21,1985, ed. Giorgio Mondadori, Milano ISBN 8837409516
- "Falleroniarte,” 1988, ed. Falleroniarte, Matelica, Macerata
- "Wait peasant!" 1990, "Cassa di Risparmio di Firenze"
- "International Catalogue of Modern Art,” N.5, 1991, ed." CIDA," Rome
- "Contemporary Painters and Sculptors: Panoramic Contemporary Art," 1995, ed." JDLR"
- "Encuentros,” 1996, municipal editor, Municipal Museum of Albacete
- "Top Arts: catalogo nazionale dell'arte contemporanea", 1997, ed." Rossano Massaccesi"
- "L'elite: selezione arte Italiana 98", 1998, ed." L'elite"
- "Dizionario enciclopedico internazionale d'arte contemporanea,”1999/2000, ed." Alba," Ferrara
- "Pittori e scultori italiani di importanza Europea", 1999, ed." Il Quadrato,” Milan, ISBN 88-86846-00-2
