= Montanaro =

Montanaro ( Môntanèr )
- Comune
- Comune di Montanaro
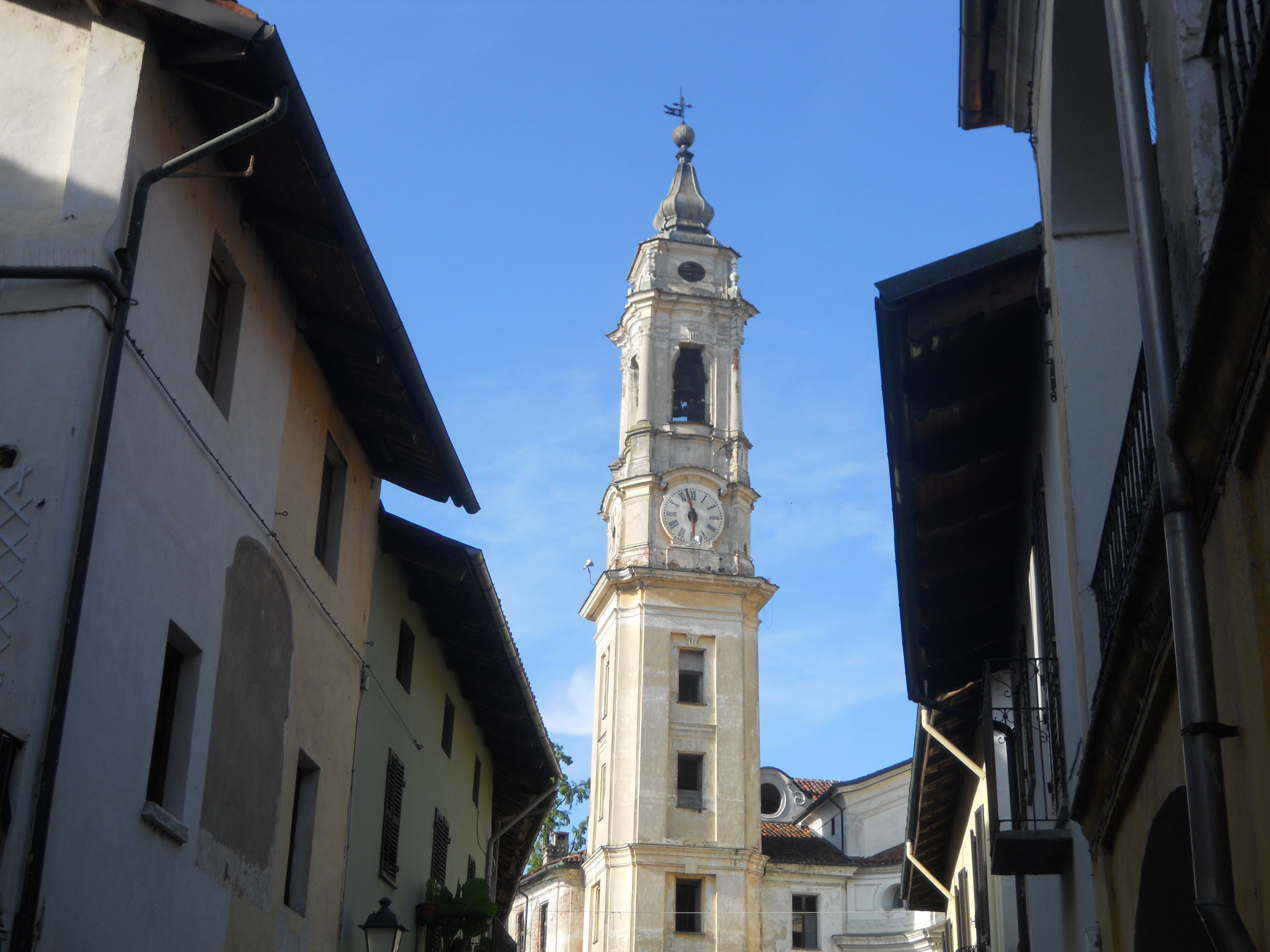

- Location within Italy Location within Piedmont
- Coordinates: 45°14′N 7°51′E
- Country: Italy
- Region: Piedmont
- Metropolitan city: Turin (TO)

Government
  - Mayor: Giovanni Ponchia

Area
  - Total: 20.8 km^{2} (8.0 sq mi)
- Elevation: 209 m (686 ft)

Population (30 November 2017)
  - Total: 5,268
  - Density: 253/km^{2} (656/sq mi)
- Demonym: Montanaresi
- Time zone: UTC+1 (CET)
  - Summer (DST): UTC+2 (CEST)
- Postal code: 10017
- Dialing code: 011
- Website: Official website

Montanaro is a comune (municipality) in the Metropolitan City of Turin in the Italian region Piedmont, located about 20 km northeast of Turin.

Montanaro borders on the following municipalities: Caluso, Foglizzo, San Benigno Canavese, and Chivasso.

Main sights include Montanaro Castle.

== Twin towns – sister cities ==
Montanaro is twinned with:

- Chiusa Sclafani, Italy
