= Massimo Montanari =

Italian historian

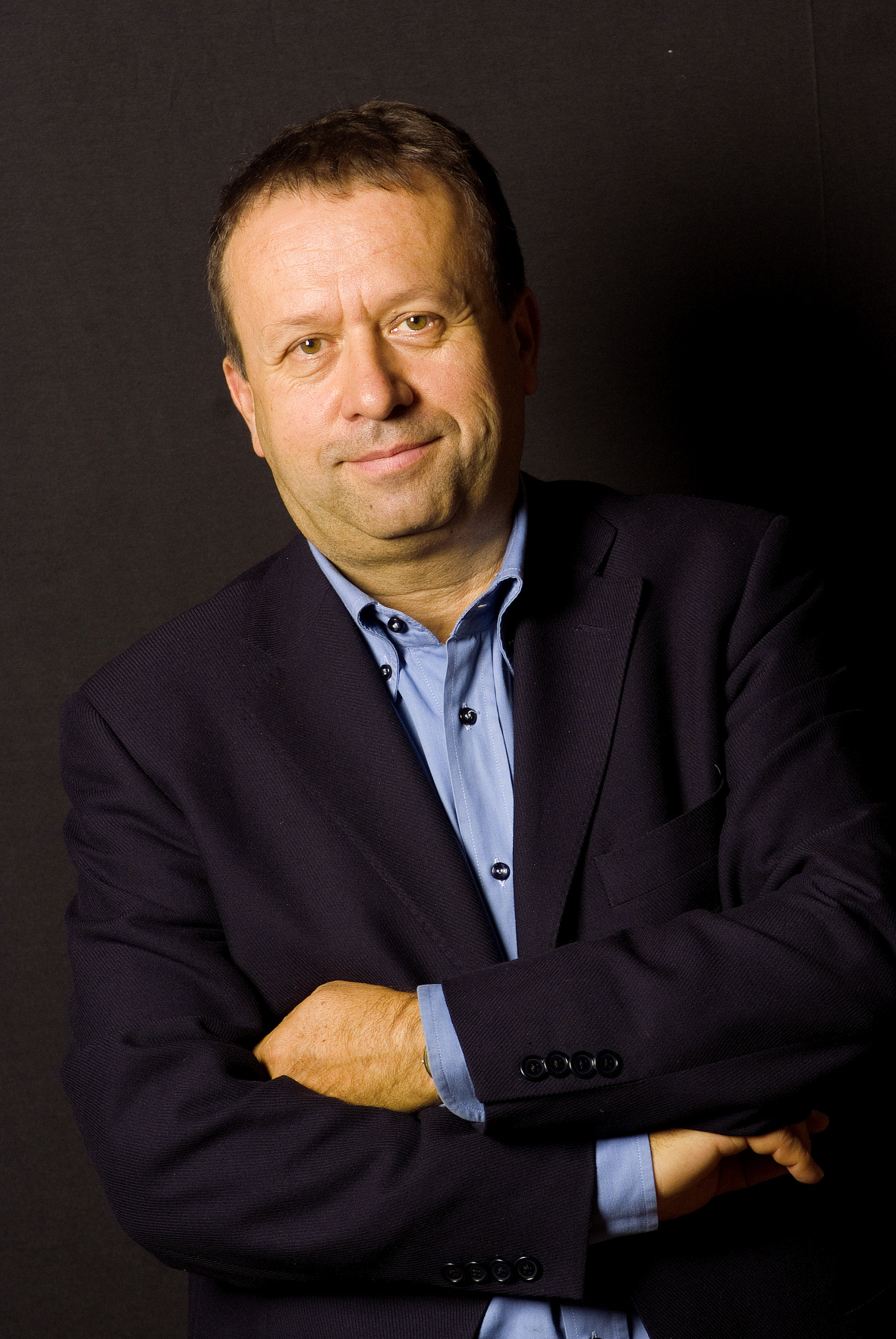
Massimo Montanari

Massimo Montanari (born 24 December 1949 in Imola, Italy) is a professor of medieval history at Bologna University. He is a scholar in food studies. His interest in the subject stems from his researches and studies in medieval agrarian history. He has been invited as visiting professor to a number of leading universities in Europe, Japan, the United States, Mexico, and Canada.

Montanari has been one of the founders and editor of the international review Food & History, published by the Institut Européen d’Histoire et des Cultures de l’Alimentation; he is member of a number of scientific societies and plays an important role in disseminating topics of his interest to the general public.

== Works ==
- A Short History of Spaghetti with Tomato Sauce. New York: Europa Editions. 2022. ISBN 9781787703285.
- L'identità italiana in cucina [Italian Identity in the Kitchen, or Food and the Nation] (in Italian). Laterza. 2010. ISBN 978-88-420-9458-6.
  - Italian Identity in the Kitchen, or Food and the Nation. Columbia University Press. 23 July 2013. ISBN 9780231160841.
- Il riposo della polpetta e altre storie intorno al cibo [Let the Meatballs Rest: And Other Stories About Food and Culture] (in Italian). Laterza. 2009. ISBN 978-88-420-9101-1.
  - Let the Meatballs Rest, and Other Stories about Food and Culture. Columbia University Press. 2012. ISBN 9780231527880.
- Il formaggio con le pere: La storia in un proverbio [Cheese, Pears, and History in a Proverb] (in Italian). Laterza. 2008. ISBN 978-88-420-9336-7.
  - Cheese, Pears, and History in a Proverb. Columbia University Press. 20 August 2010. ISBN 9780231152518.
- Montanari, Massimo, ed. (2007). L'olmo, la quercia, il nido di gazze. Ricordi di Vito Fumagalli (1938-1997) (in Italian). CISAM. ISBN 978-88-7988-124-1.
- Il cibo come cultura [Food is culture] (in Italian). Laterza. 2004.
  - Food is Culture. Columbia University Press. 2006. ISBN 9781283008464.
- Massimo Montanari, ed. (2004). Bologna grassa. La costruzione di un mito (in Italian). CLUEB. ISBN 9788849120691.
- Massimo Montanari, Françoise Sabban, ed. (2004). Atlante dell'alimentazione e della gastronomia: Risorse, scambi, consumi-Cucine, pasti, convivialità (in Italian). UTET. ISBN 88-02-06097-5.
- Imola, il comune, le piazze con Tiziana Lazzari (a cura di) (La Mandragora 2003)
- Storia medievale, con Giuseppe Albertoni, Tiziana Lazzari e Giuliano Milani (Laterza 2002)
  - Medieval Tastes: Food, Cooking, and the Table. Columbia University Press. 24 March 2015. ISBN 9780231167864.
- Il mondo in cucina. Storia, identità, scambi, (a cura di) (Laterza 2002)
- Medievistica italiana e storia agraria. Risultati e prospettive di una stagione storiografica. (Atti del convegno di Montalcino, 12-14 dicembre 1997), con Alfio Cortonesi (a cura di) (CLUEB 2001)
- Per Vito Fumagalli. Terra, uomini, istituzioni medievali, con Augusto Vasina (a cura di)(CLUEB 2000)
- Storia dell'Emilia-Romagna, con Maurizio Ridolfi e Renato Zangheri (a cura di) (Laterza 1999)
- Montanari, Massimo; Capatti, Alberto (1999). La cucina italiana: Storia di una cultura [Italian Cuisine: A Cultural History]. Laterza.
  - Capatti, Alberto; Montanari, Massimo (2003). Italian Cuisine: A Cultural History. Columbia University Press. ISBN 9780231122320.
- Montanari, Massimo; Flandrin, Jean-Louis, eds. (1996). Histoire de l'Alimentation [Food: A Culinary History]. Fayard. ISBN 978-2213594576.
  - Flandrin, Jean Louis; Montanari, Massimo; Sonnenfeld, Albert; Press, Columbia University (1999). Food: A Culinary History from Antiquity to the Present. Columbia University Press. ISBN 9780231111546.
- Il pentolino magico (Laterza 1995)
- Montanari, Massimo; Marco, Riva; Turchi, Maria Christina (1995). From the Stove to the Computer: 100 Recipes from Emilia and Romagna. Office of Documentation and Printing, Emilia-Romagna Region. OCLC 243712652.
- Il bosco nel Medioevo, con Bruno Andreolli (a cura di) (CLUEB 1995)
- Contadini di Romagna nel medioevo (CLUEB 1994)
- La fame e l'abbondanza. Storia dell'alimentazione in Europa [The Culture of Food, transl. Carl Ipsen] (Laterza 1993)
  - The Culture of Food. Oxford: Blackwell. 9 December 1996. ISBN 9780631182658.
- Convivio oggi. Storia e cultura dei piaceri della tavola nell'età contemporanea (Laterza 1992)
- Nuovo convivio. Storia e cultura dei piaceri della tavola nell'età moderna (Laterza 1991)
- Convivio: Storia e cultura dei piaceri della tavola dall'antichità al Medioevo (Laterza 1989)
- Alimentazione e cultura nel Medioevo (Laterza 1988)
- Contadini e città tra "Longobardia" e "Romania" (Salimbeni 1988)
- Le campagne italiane prima e dopo il mille. Una società in trasformazione, con Bruno Andreolli e Vito Fumagalli (a cura di) (CLUEB 1985)
- Campagne medievali. Strutture produttive, rapporti di lavoro, sistemi alimentari (Einaudi 1984)
- L'azienda curtense in Italia. Proprietà della terra e lavoro contadino nei secoli VIII-XI, con Bruno Andreolli (CLUEB 1983)
- Porci e porcari nel medioevo. Paesaggio. Economia. Alimentazione. Catalogo della mostra, San Marino di Bentivoglio, con Marina Baruzzi (CLUEB 1981)
- L'alimentazione contadina nell'alto Medioevo (Liguori 1979)

== Appointments and memberships ==
=== Former ===
2009 - Visiting Professor at the Université de Paris VII, Paris Diderot
2008 - Visiting Professor at four Canadian universities (The University of British Columbia, The University of Guelph, Wilfird Laurier University, The University of Western Ontario)
2007 - Visiting Professor at the Université Libre de Bruxelles (ULB)
2001 - Visiting Professor at four universities in Japan (Tokyo, Kyoto, Osaka, Nagoya)
1993 - Visiting Professor at UCLA
1992 - Visiting Professor at the École des Hautes Études en Sciences Sociales in Paris

=== Current ===
- Director of the International Master "Storia e cultura dell'alimentazione", at the Faculty of Letters and Philosophy of the University of Bologna
- Director of the book series Biblioteca di Storia Agraria Medievale (Library of Medieval Agrarian History) by the Cooperativa Libraria Universitaria Editrice di Bologna (CLUEB)
- Director of the journal Food & History, published by the Institut Européen d'Histoire et Cultures de l'Alimentation, Tours (France)
- President of the Center for Studies in the History of the Countryside and Rural Work (Centro di studi per la storia delle campagne e del lavoro contadino), Montalcino (Siena)
- President of the scientific committee of Casa Artusi
- President of the evaluation commission for market certification DegustiBo
- Consultant and associate publisher for Laterza
- Member of the editorial boards of journals Quaderni medievali, Rivista di storia dell'agricoltura, Ricerche storiche, Food and Foodways
- Member of the scientific committee of the Institut Européen d'Histoire et Cultures de l'Alimentation - IEHCA
- Member of the scientific committee for l'EXPO 2015 in Milan
- Board member of the Italian Center of Medieval Studies Centro Italiano di Studi sull'Alto Medioevo of Spoleto (Perugia)
