= Neapolitan ragù =

Meat-based sauce from Naples, Italy

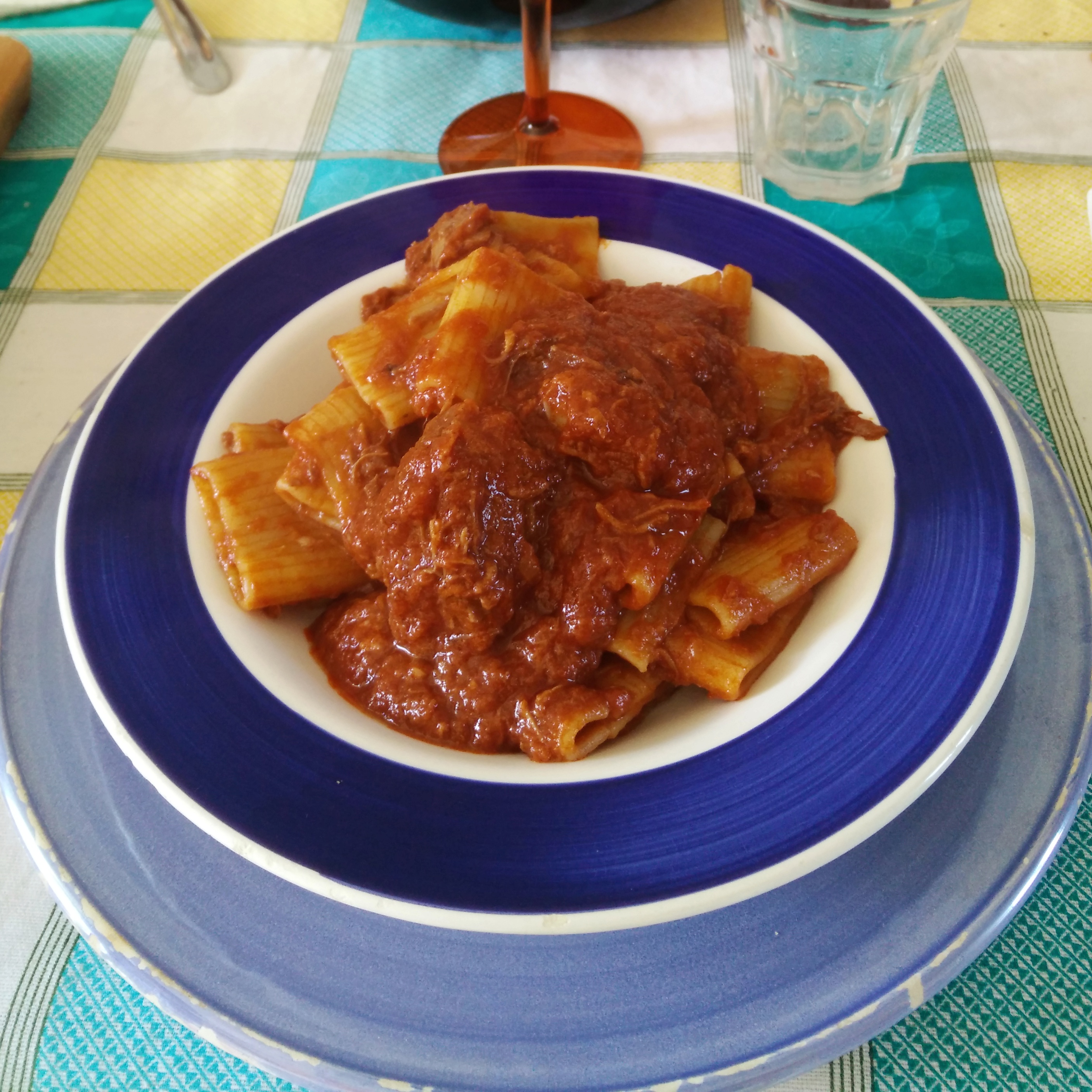
- Paccheri pasta served with Neapolitan ragù
- Alternative names: Ragù alla napoletana or ragù napoletano (Italian), rraù (Neapolitan)
- Type: Ragù
- Place of origin: Italy
- Region or state: Naples, Campania
- Associated cuisine: Neapolitan
- Main ingredients: Meat cuts (beef and pork), onion, tomato paste or purée, wine, basil

Neapolitan ragù (rraù in the Neapolitan language) is a ragù associated with the city of Naples, Italy, made by braising meat over several hours in tomato purée and sauce. When the meat is ready, it is set aside and the sauce is left to continue cooking and thickening. In the Italian meal structure, Neapolitan ragù is served in two stages: first as sauce served over pasta, and then as meat eaten alone or with vegetables, lightly dressed with the remaining sauce.

Ragùs are typically rich, meaty sauces that are eaten across Italy. The people of Naples hold their version in high regard, and several writers from the area describe it as the "queen of sauces". Throughout Italy, the dish is known under names including ragù alla napoletana (Note: Italian pronunciation: [raˈɡu alla napoleˈtaːna]) and ragù napoletano. Although it contains tomato and meat, it is perceived as fundamentally a meat sauce, with the tomato a conduit for meat flavours.

Neapolitan ragù evolved from the French ragoût that was introduced to Italy in the late 17th century. Over the following 150 years, ingredients foreign to the modern ragù such as asparagus and truffle were dropped, and tomatoes and pasta were added. In the 19th century, emigrants brought the dish to America, where it was developed into the Italian-American gravy and the dish spaghetti and meatballs.

The dish is far less well-known than ragù alla bolognese. The two differ in several respects: the Neapolitan ragù cooks for a longer time, includes more tomatoes and rarely celery and carrot, uses whole pieces of meat rather than minced, and is usually served with short, ridged pastas rather than long, flat ones.

== Origin ==
=== Historical ===
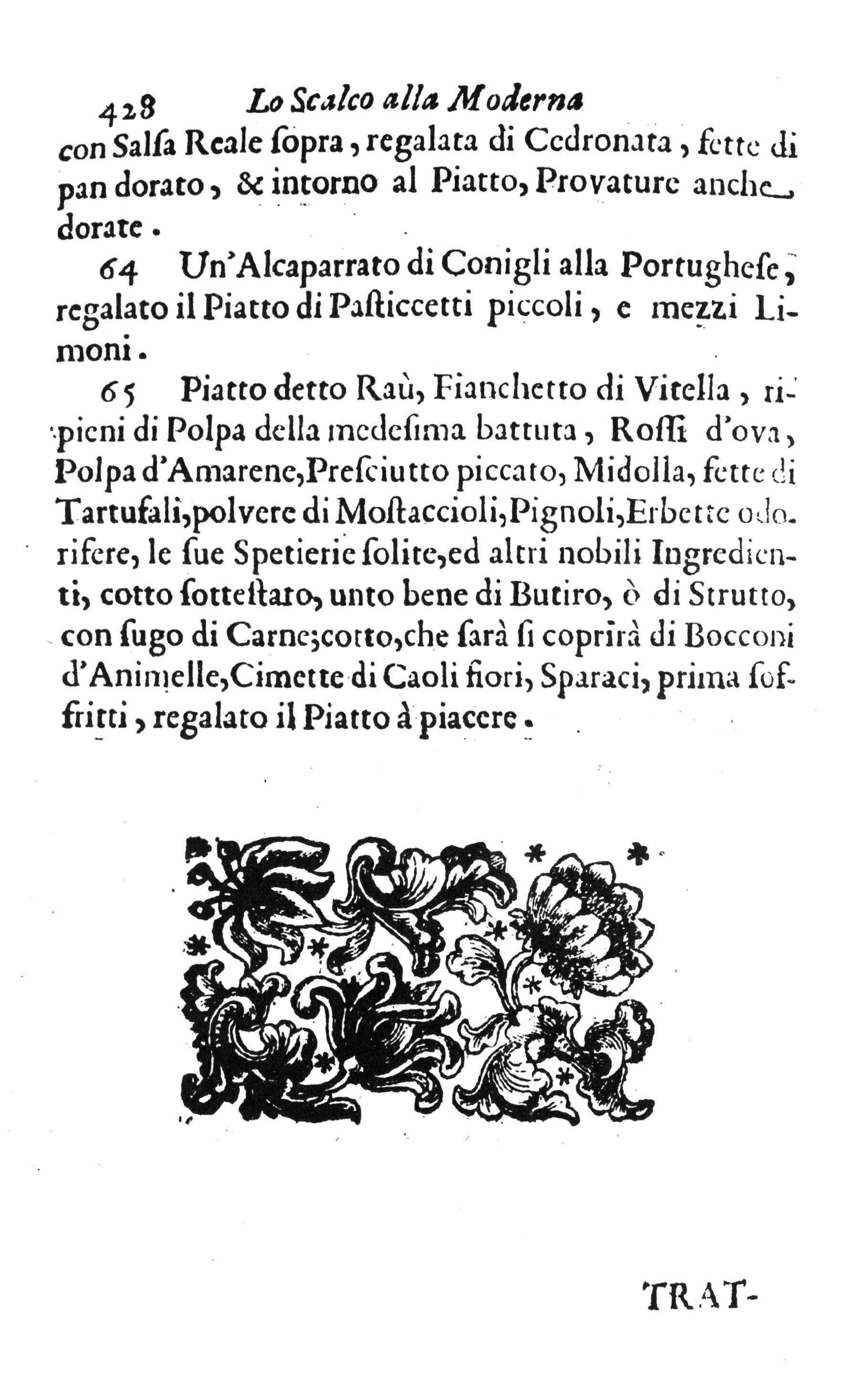
Antonio Latini's 1692 recipe for a ragù (65), the first to appear in Naples. A translation is supplied in the footnotes. (Note: "Dish called raù—veal flank filled with chopped veal meat, egg yolks, sour cherry pulp, cured/larded [spicy?] ham, bone marrow, truffle slices, mostaccioli powder [i.e. mix of sweet spices used in mostaccioli ], pine nuts, herbs, common spices, and other prized ingredients; cooked in a lidded casserole, well greased with butter or lard/suet, with meat sauce; once it is cooked, it will be served with previously sautéed sweetbreads, cauliflowerets and asparaguses, and seasoned according to taste.")

Ragùs—rich sauces often made with meat—are eaten across Italy with pasta. They evolved from the French ragoût, from which they also derived their name. Ragoûts were first described in the early 17th century, and for their first 200 years they were understood as a class of sauces that could flavour otherwise plain servings of meat. For at least some of that period, they were prepared in a basic method of browning meat and vegetables in fat, braising them in a broth, then thickening the dish with flour. In the second half of the 17th century, ragoûts spread across Europe, and by 1662 they had arrived in northern Italy, when the chef Bartolomeo Stefani wrote of a ragù made from "egg yolks, mastic, lemon juice and veal kidney fat". Within 30 years, ragù had made it to Naples under the name raù. One recipe was described by the steward Antonio Latini, comprising a cut of veal that was stuffed, baked, and served with a separately cooked sauce. It featured ingredients foreign to the modern ragù, including asparagus, black cherries, sweetbreads, and truffle.

In 1773, the Neapolitan chef Vincenzo Corrado published Il cuoco galante, listing three ways ragù was being eaten: with veal, sturgeon, and eggs. In Il cuoco galante, Corrado gave a recipe for timballo, a baked pasta dish derived from the French timbale. This recipe included the meat gravy sugo di carne ('meat sauce'), representing an early example of combining pasta and meat in a single dish. In 1790, Francesco Leonardi described a dish of Maccaroni alla Napolitana in his book L'Apicio moderno. This dish resembled Corrado's, but Leonardi's pasta was not encased in pastry; the historian Luca Cesari describes the sauce as an "embryonic" Neapolitan ragù. This dish closely resembled versions of Genovese sauce then made in Naples, and the two were sometimes treated as interchangeable. Leonardi also gave a broad treatment of ragùs, providing 73 recipes using ingredients such as truffles, champagne, herbs, and butter, as well as "chicken livers, combs and testicles, unlaid eggs, prawn tails [and] artichoke bottoms", many of which were then held in high regard. One recipe recommends serving the sauce with a baked pasta, the first recorded instance of a ragù from the ragoût tradition and pasta being served together.

Around 1807, a second edition of L'Apicio moderno was published, and the recipe for Maccaroni alla Napolitana was updated to include tomatoes. Food historian Massimo Montanari suggests the practice of adding tomatoes may have originated among the general population, and over time proliferated through the classes. Two further developments were offered around the same time across editions of the cookbook La cucina casereccia ('Homemade Cooking') authored by an "M. F.". The first was seen in the fourth edition, published in 1804, which showed the first recorded use of the term ragù rather than sugo di carne for the meat sauce accompanying pasta. In the seventh edition, published in 1828, a recipe for pasta and ragù close to the modern version was supplied, still made distinct by a practice of serving ragù over grated cheese.

Despite the book's populist title, these were recipes adapted for the aristocratic palate, and were unaffordable for many Neapolitans. Ragù remained a rare meal for most of the populace—meat was expensive for the poor of southern Italy, who could afford it only a few times a year, most often around holidays. In the 19th and 20th centuries, cookbooks began to target women in the home, and recipes were adapted to suit cooks who could spend less time cooking. Compared to these new recipes, preparing Neapolitan ragù was time-consuming and costly, and the ragù became increasingly associated with holidays and the Sunday lunch. Versions with and without tomatoes continued to exist until the 20th century, when their inclusion became mandatory. Preparations without tomato persisted in the Genovese sauce, drawing a clear distinction between the two for the first time.

=== Legendary ===
A legendary account of the dish's origin is told in Naples. The story recounts that at the end of the 14th century, members of a religious association known as the Company of the Whites of Justice travelled throughout Naples, praying for peace and mercy and imploring the people to reconcile with their enemies. One day, they arrived at the Palazzo Filippo d'Angiò where a cruel lord lived. He was the only person in the city who refused to let go of his anger and grudges, even when his son Raù, at three months old, miraculously crossed his arms and repeatedly exclaimed "Mercy and peace". To quell her husband's rage, the lord's wife prepared a dish of pasta, which through divine providence was covered with blood. Moved greatly by this, the lord gave up his anger and forgave his enemies. Seeing this, his wife again made the sauce, and again, a red liquid appeared atop it. This time it had a pleasing aroma; upon tasting and finding it delicious, the lord named it after his son.

== Ingredients ==
Despite containing elements of both meat and tomato, in Naples the local ragù is viewed primarily as a meat sauce (sugo di carne), and the tomato is understood as a medium to carry meat flavour.

The meat or combination thereof is determined by the cook's preference and location. In the countryside around Naples, water buffalo are consumed where they are reared. In the province of Benevento, at least part of the meat is lamb, and in the Cilento mountains of Salerno, goat is used—both the young, and the castrated and old. Cuts of meat favoured for ragù are those that take hours to tenderise; beef shoulder, beef shins, and pork short ribs are typical. In Naples's poorer past, the choice of meat was informed by price, and offcuts and sausages were common.

Over the second half of the 20th century, pork gained prominence in preparations, and a ragù made simply from beef fell out of fashion. By the 1990s, a ragù made of braciola—beef stuffed with cheese and other fillings—had become a popular preparation after the price of the ingredient fell. Over the same period, preparations of Neapolitan ragù became less fatty. Before World War II, some recipes used olive oil, rendered lard, and unrendered lard in a single preparation, sometimes with the addition of butter. By the mid-1990s a lighter ragù became popular, and chefs cooked with little and sometimes no fat. Other common additions include pork sausages and cotica, pork skin softened over a long cooking process. In a ragù preparation, cotica is rolled tightly, enclosing garlic, raisins, parsley, and pine nuts, and added to the sauce as it cooks.

Tomato appears as purée and paste. Older preparations of the ragù used conserva, a deep red tomato paste, made by salting, drying and milling tomatoes, which were left to dry in the sun. By the mid-1990s, the ingredient had become hard to find in the city. In Naples, a homemade tomato paste is believed to distinguish good ragù from great, alongside using a local pecorino rather than another sheep's milk cheese, and sourcing the wine from vineyards around Mount Vesuvius. Aromatics include onion, on occasion in soffritto as the dominant element. A distinct practice is observed in Benevento, where garlic is used, sometimes in conjunction with onion. The inclusion of both in a single dish has been uncommon in Campanian cooking, with the combination viewed as redundant; modern preparations generally call for both. Other ingredients include red wine, basil, and cinnamon.

Several ingredients distinguish Neapolitan ragù from the better-known ragù alla bolognese, including the use of whole rather than minced meat, the infrequent appearance of celery and carrot, as well as the prominent presence of tomato.

== Preparation ==
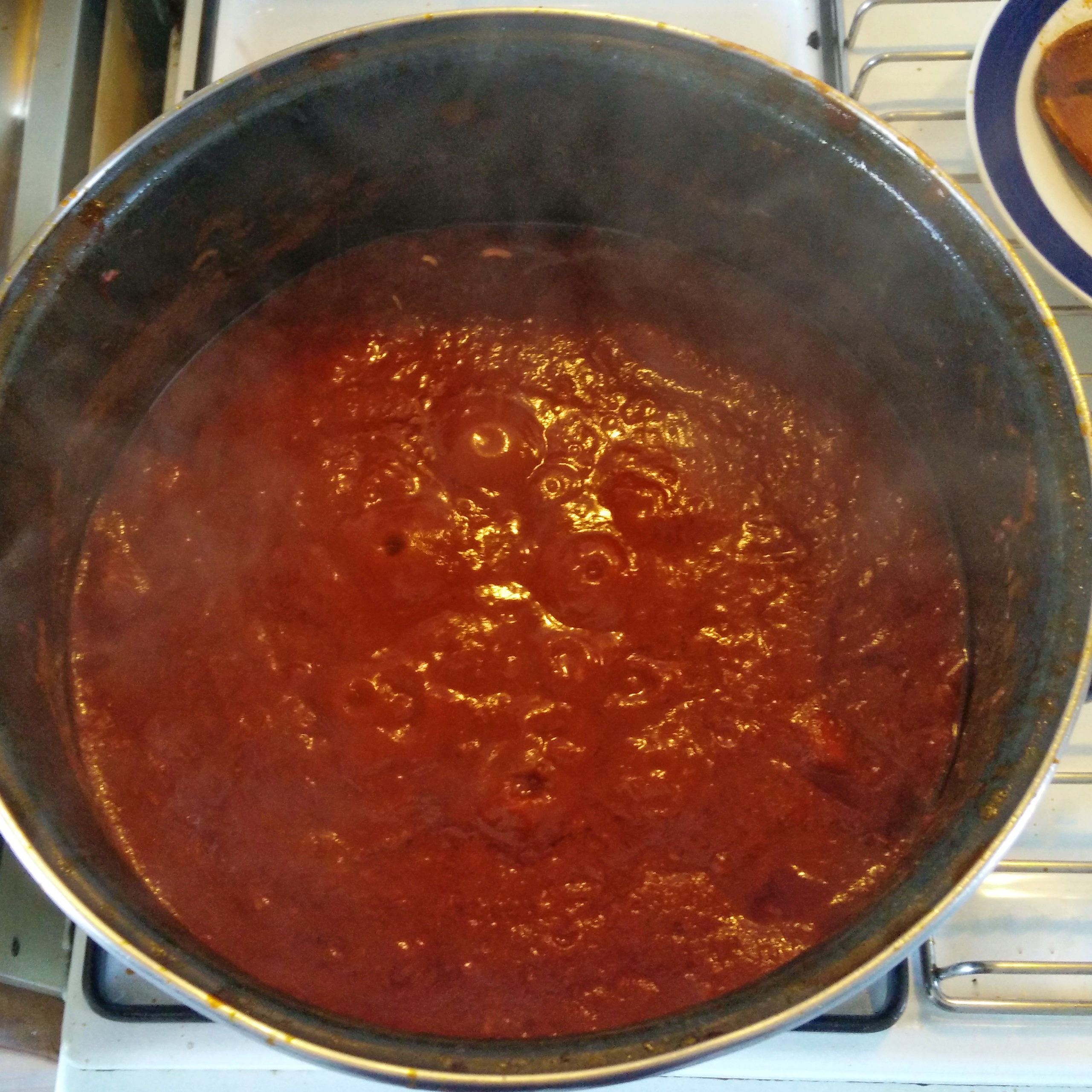
Neapolitan ragù cooking in a pot

Neapolitan ragù is made by browning then slowly braising meat or meats in tomato purée and paste, stirring periodically to prevent burning on the bottom of the pot. When ready, the meat is removed and the sauce is left to reduce and thicken.

Neapolitan ragù is known for its long cooking time, which is longer than ragù alla bolognese. Stories exchanged within the families of Naples describe ragù being cooked "all day" in the era before World War II, as ragù was cooked in pottery cookware over an unreliable coal fire and required continual vigilance and intermittent stirring. For this, the ragù acquired the name sugo della guardaporta ('sauce of the door-keeper'), after the only group popularly said to have the time needed to keep watch. Despite the dish being prepared for larger families in large pots with correspondingly long cooking times, descriptions of cooking taking entire days are probably fanciful.

By the mid-1990s, the lighter ragù had become popular. This was cooked for less time, although it was commonly believed that the dish had to be cooked for at least 2.5 hours to be considered ragù. Around that time, it was held, the colour shifts and a dramatic flavour transformation occurs. The low temperature at which the sauce is held over this time is captured in the term peppiare, meaning 'cook below a simmer'. Peppiare is an onomatopoeia, referencing the sound of bubbles breaking at the surface, and the change in timbre as the sauce thickens. In a modern Italy where women work outside the home more than was historically common, long cooking times have meant Neapolitan ragù is made less frequently, and an industry mass-producing ragù sauce by the jar has emerged.

As with ingredients, several beliefs exist in Naples for how the best ragù is prepared. Specific cookware—wooden spoons and flameproof terracotta pots—are held as essential. To add depth of flavour, one technique involves adding tomato sauce in stages, allowing the liquid to reduce between additions.

Several writers from Naples have described the ragù as the "queen of sauces". Families in the area also hold their ragù in high regard and continue to prepare it, following recipes that they keep secret. The dish is typically eaten at Sunday lunch, with cooks beginning cooking early in the morning. The distinctive fragrance is associated with Sundays and promotes "a relaxed and family-oriented mood" according to the researchers Patrícia Branco and Richard Mohr. At times, emotive disagreements take place on- and offline over what recipe should be considered the most traditional. These disputes were dramatised in the 1990 film adaptation of Eduardo De Filippo's 1959 play Saturday, Sunday and Monday (Sabato, domenica e lunedì) in a scene in which Sophia Loren's character visits a butcher and argues with customers and staff. The play was an adaptation of a 1947 poem, "O rraù", written by De Filippo in the Neapolitan dialect, in which a narrator tells his wife that because she has not made ragù as his mother had, she has only made "meat with tomatoes".

== Serving ==
As with several dishes in Neapolitan cuisine, such as Genovese sauce, ragù di salsiccia, and stuffed squid, the Neapolitan ragù is served across two courses in the Italian meal structure. In the first, the sauce is served over short, ridged pasta, sometimes topped with basil and parmesan. At times, the meat is included in the dish here—sometimes as a sliver served atop, and with increasing frequency interspersed throughout. The meat then follows as the second course, either by itself or with vegetable sides, dressed with some of the remaining sauce. If cotica has been added, it is cut into slivers and portioned out to diners. If the meat is not eaten, it may be saved for the next day.

Common choices of pasta include macaroni, gnocchi, or ziti, though location has a key deciding role: in Benevento the ragù is eaten with cavatelli, in the Alburni mountain range of Salerno with fusilli, and in Naples, ziti is the archetypal first course for a Sunday lunch. The use of short ridged pastas distinguishes the Neapolitan ragù from ragù alla bolognese, which generally uses the long, flat tagliatelle.

During Carnival, Neapolitan ragù covers the local lasagne di Carnevale, a baked pasta dish containing mozzarella and ricotta, sausages and small fried meatballs, as well as hard-boiled eggs. It is sometimes included in the timballo.

== In North America ==
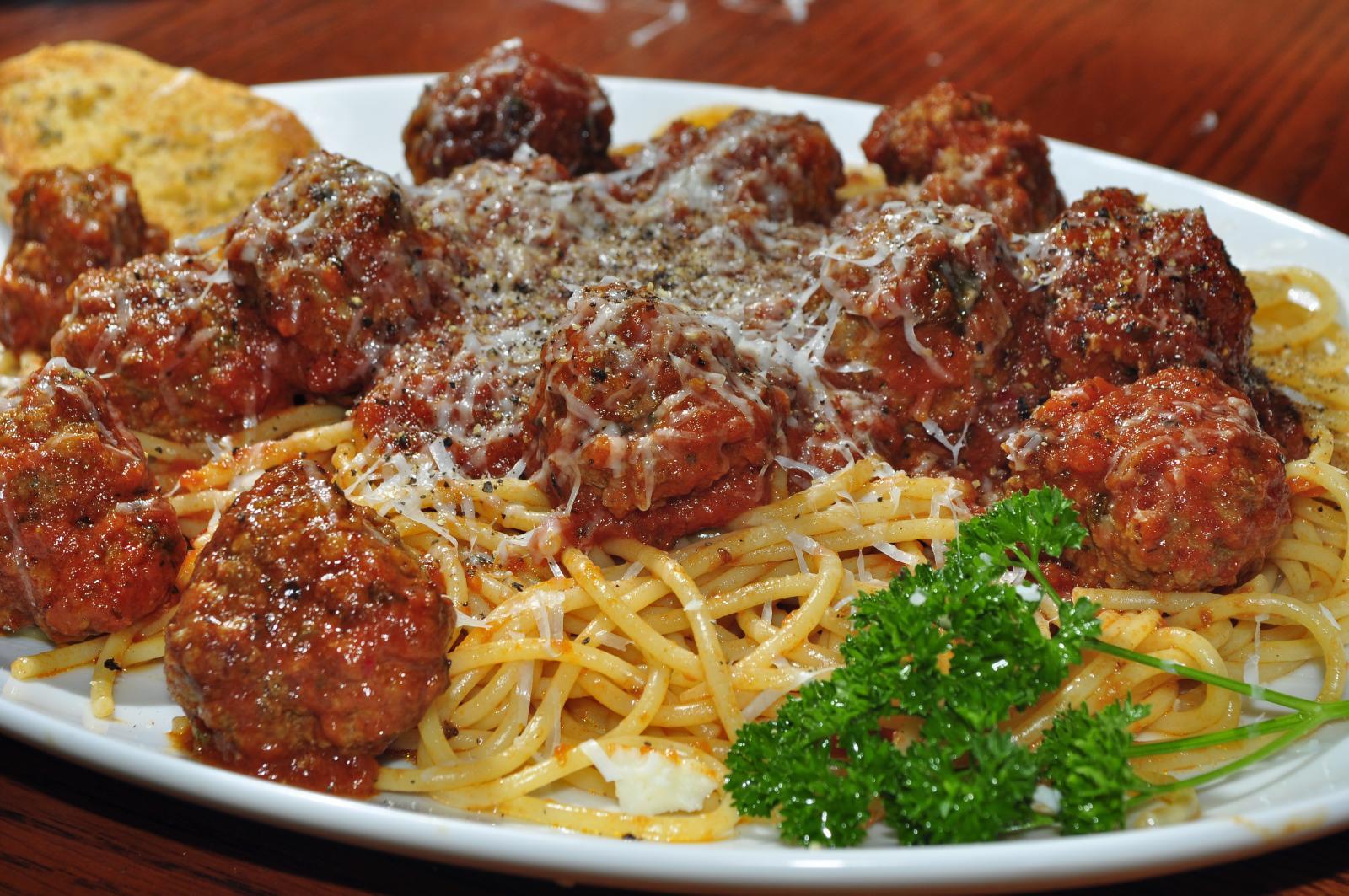
Spaghetti and meatballs is adapted from Neapolitan ragù.

In the late 19th century, Italians emigrated to America. There, they found that meat was more affordable, allowing the poor to have it at every Sunday dinner. It was often prepared as a meat sauce, sometimes called "gravy". (Note: How the term gravy originated is unclear; the food writer Ian MacAllen describes it as a mistranslation of ragù.) Most of the time, this meat sauce was an adaptation of Neapolitan ragù, and many families maintained the practice of serving ragù over two courses. The amount and type of meat used varied as income permitted, but beef, pork, salt pork, sausages, and veal were common. Braciola was another frequent inclusion, stuffed with ham, breadcrumbs, cheese, and herbs in the American version of the dish. By bringing family together, the Sunday dinner served as an important ritual for Italian Americans, even after meat consumption spread across the week as families grew wealthier.

By the early 20th century, Neapolitan ragù was adapted into the dish spaghetti and meatballs. In this new dish, large balls of minced meat were substituted for the cuts of meat present in Neapolitan ragù, which were served atop a pile of spaghetti. These concepts—serving meatballs with spaghetti, meatballs as large as those in America, and serving meat with pasta as a first course—were foreign to Italian cooking. As spaghetti and meatballs gained popularity in the 1920s and 1930s, driven by restaurant economics and the Great Depression, the division between a first course of pasta served with sauce and a second course of dressed meat became less observed. The same was seen in homes, although some families retained the practice in Sunday meals.

== See also ==
- List of meat-based sauces
- Sausages in Italian cuisine
- Ragù bolognese
- Ragù di salsiccia

== Bibliography ==
- Branco, Patrícia; Mohr, Richard (2023). "Odore di Napoli: Normativity from Objects and Smells". In Philippopoulos-Mihalopoulos, Andreas; Mandic, Danilo; Nirta, Caterina; Pavoni, Andrea (eds.). SMELL. Law and the Senses. London: University of Westminster Press. pp. 31–73. ISBN 978-1-915445-13-1. JSTOR jj.9474307.4.
- Bugialli, Giuliano (2003). Giuliano Bugialli's Foods of Naples and Campania. London: Stewart, Tabori & Chang. ISBN 1-58479-211-6.
- Cesari, Luca (2022) [2021 (in Italian)]. The Discovery of Pasta: A History in Ten Dishes. Translated by Bishop, Johanna. London: Profile Books. ISBN 978-1-78816-939-4.
- Del Conte, Anna (1993) [1989]. Secrets from an Italian kitchen. London: Corgi Books. ISBN 0-552-99365-4.
- Del Conte, Anna (2004) [2001]. The Concise Gastronomy of Italy. New York: Barnes and Nobles. ISBN 0-7607-6344-5.
- Fasulo Rak, Maria Giovanna (1995). La cucina napoletana in cento ricette tradizionali [Neapolitan Cuisine in One Hundred Traditional Recipes]. Rome: Newton. ISBN 88-8183-174-0.
- Gentilcore, David (2010). Pomodoro! A History of the Tomato in Italy. New York: Columbia University Press. ISBN 978-0-231-15206-8.
- Latini, Antonio (1692). Lo scalco alla moderna overo l'arte di ben disporre li conviti (in Italian). Naples: Domenico Antonio Parrino & Michele Luigi Muzio.
- M. F. (1828). La cucina casereccia [Homemade Cooking] (in Italian) (7th ed.). Naples: Presso Sav. Giordano.
- MacAllen, Ian (2022). Red Sauce: How Italian Food became American. Lanham, Maryland: Rowman & Littlefield. ISBN 978-1-5381-6234-7.
- Mattozzi, Antonio (2015) [2009 (in Italian)]. Inventing the Pizzeria: A History of Pizza Making in Naples. Translated by Nowak, Zachary. London: Bloomsbury. ISBN 978-1-4725-8616-2.
- Montanari, Massimo (2021) [2019 (in Italian)]. A Short History of Spaghetti with Tomato Sauce. Translated by Conti, Gregory. London: Europa Editions. ISBN 978-1-78770-328-5.
- Parasecoli, Fabio (2004). Food Culture in Italy. Food Culture Around the World. Connecticut: Greenwood Publishing Group. ISBN 0-313-32726-2.
- Piazzesi, Elisabetta; Giardinetto, Salvatore (1998). Pizza e cucina napoletana (in Italian). Florence, Tuscany: Bonechi. ISBN 88-8029-896-8.
- Riley, Gillian (2007). The Oxford Companion to Italian Food. New York: Oxford University Press. ISBN 978-0-19-860617-8.
- Schwartz, Arthur (1998). Naples at Table: Cooking in Campania. New York: HarperCollins. ISBN 0-06-018261-X.
- Spieler, Marlena (2018). A Taste of Naples: Neapolitan Culture, Cuisine, and Cooking. London: Rowman & Littlefield. ISBN 978-1-4422-5126-7.
- Tebben, Maryann (2017). "Semiotics of sauce: Representing Italian/American identity through sauce". In Naccarato, Peter; Nowak, Zachary; Eckert, Elgin K. (eds.). Representing Italy Through Food. London & New York: Bloomsbury. pp. 183–201. ISBN 978-1-4742-8042-6.
