= Barese ragù =

Ragù from Bari, Italy

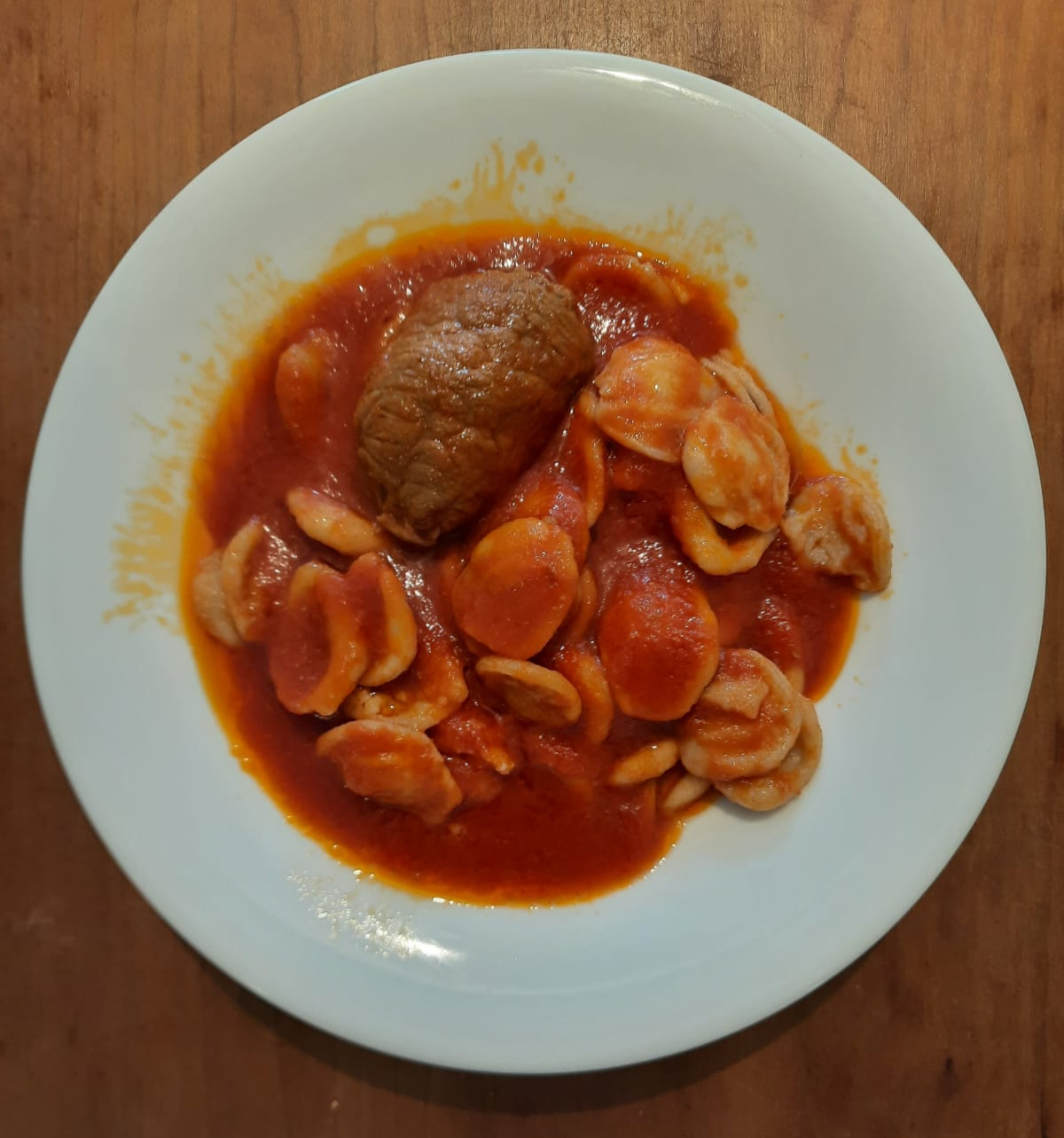
- Alternative names: Ragù alla barese; ragù di braciole; ragù di brasciole
- Course: Sauce; pasta dish
- Place of origin: Italy
- Region or state: Bari, Apulia
- Main ingredients: Tomato sauce, meat rolls, beef or veal, horse meat, lamb, pork, pecorino, garlic, parsley, olive oil
- Variations: Beef, veal, horse meat, pork, lamb

Barese ragù (Italian: ragù alla barese) is a meat-based tomato sauce from Bari, in the Apulia region of southern Italy. It is commonly associated with Sunday and feast-day meals and is traditionally served with orecchiette, the ear-shaped pasta closely associated with Apulian cuisine.

Unlike northern Italian ragùs, which often use minced or finely chopped meat, Barese ragù is typically made by slowly cooking whole pieces of meat and stuffed meat rolls in tomato sauce. The sauce is served with pasta as a first course, while the meat may be eaten separately as a second course.

== Names ==
The dish is generally called ragù alla barese, meaning “ragù in the style of Bari”. It is also closely associated with braciole or brasciole, stuffed meat rolls cooked in tomato sauce.

The term ragù in Italian cuisine refers broadly to a meat-based sauce served with pasta.

The term comes from the French ragoût and reached the Emilia-Romagna region in the late 18th century, perhaps following Napoleon's 1796 invasion and occupation of those northern regions.

== Preparation ==
Barese ragù is usually prepared by browning meat in olive oil and then simmering it slowly in tomato sauce. The meat may include beef, veal, pork, lamb, sausage, or horse meat, depending on family tradition and local preference.

A characteristic element of many versions is the use of braciole or brasciole: thin slices of meat filled with ingredients such as pecorino cheese, garlic, parsley, lard, pancetta, salt and pepper. The rolls are tied or secured with toothpicks and cooked for several hours in the tomato sauce, flavoring the ragù as they braise.

Some recipes describe the sauce as being cooked for three to five hours, especially when tougher meats are used. Traditional preparations may use a terracotta pot and slow cooking over low heat.

== Variations ==
Like many Italian dishes, there is no standard recipe for Barese ragù as there are different varieties between families and regions. Some versions emphasize veal or beef rolls, while others include horse meat, lamb, pork, sausage, or mixed meats.

Horse meat is often cited as part of the older or more traditional version of the dish, particularly in relation to brasciole. However, most modern versions, particularly outside of Apulia, use veal or beef instead of the traditional horse meat.

== Serving ==
Barese ragù is usually served with orecchiette. In the traditional Italian meal structure, the pasta and the sauce is eaten first, followed by meat and meat rolls as a second course.

Puglia Autentica describes orecchiette with Barese ragù as one of the most popular dishes of Apulia, especially in the Bari area, and as a classic Sunday dish in southern families.

The dish is strongly associated with Sunday lunch in Bari and Apulia. Food and travel guides to Bari also identify the ragù as a traditional Sunday preparation, particularly as a condiment for orecchiette.

== Cultural significance ==
In Bari, orecchiette and Barese ragù are part of the city’s food identity. The food is closely connected to the concept of family gatherings and Sunday meal tradition.

The dish is part of the larger Souther Italian sauces where meat is slow cooked in tomato sauce and eaten during several courses.

== See also ==
- Apulian cuisine
- Orecchiette
- Ragù
- Neapolitan ragù
- Bolognese sauce
- List of meat-based sauces
