= List of meat-based sauces =

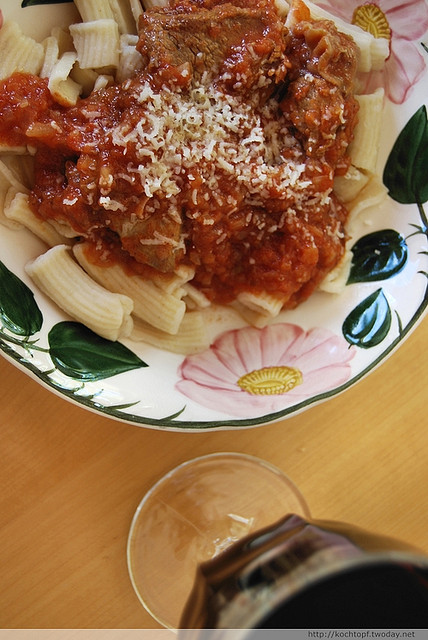
Neapolitan ragù atop pasta

Meat-based sauces are sauces prepared using various types of meat as a primary ingredient. They are commonly served with or over rice, pasta, or other starches. Thick meat-based sauces are sometimes used as sandwich fillings.

== Meat-based sauces ==
- Amatriciana, an Italian sauce containing tomatoes and pancetta
- Carbonara, an Italian sauce containing guanciale or pancetta and eggs
- Caruso sauce, an Uruguayan sauce of ham, cream, nuts and mushrooms served over pasta.
- Cincinnati chili, a regional ground beef and tomato sauce typically served over pasta or hot dogs. Similar sauces are served on chili dogs or Coney Islands in Michigan, Rhode Island, and New York.
- Curry, a variety of southeast Asian-style sauces that can include meat, poultry, seafood, tofu, or vegetables braised with tomato puree, broth, coconut milk, yogurt, or other ingredients, often served over rice.
  - Madras curry sauce is a south-Indian style red curry sauce.
  - Massaman curry, a Thai curry
- Jajang, a meat and vegetable sauce that tops noodles in the Korean-style Chinese dish Jajangmyeon.
- Korma, an Indian sauce made with meat and/or vegetables braised in yogurt and served with rice.
- Palaver sauce, a west African stew-like sauce containing vegetables, meat and/or seafood, and served with rice, fufu, or other starches.
- Picadillo, a thick sauce of tomatoes and ground beef traditional to multiple cuisines with regional variations
- Ragù, an Italian meat-based sauce with numerous variations
  - Barese ragù, an Italian sauce containing pork and lamb
  - Bolognese, an Italian ground beef, veal or pork sauce typically served over pasta
  - Neapolitan ragù, an Italian meat sauce
  - Ragù alla salsiccia, an Italian sausage-based sauce
- Saltsa kima, a Greek topping for spaghetti.
- Satsivi, a Georgian dish of chicken in walnut sauce.
- Sausage gravy, a sausage-based white sauce served with or over biscuits in the American south.
- Sloppy Joe, a thick sauce of tomatoes and ground beef often served as sandwich filling

== See also ==
- List of sauces
