= Ragù =

Meat-based sauce in Italian cuisine

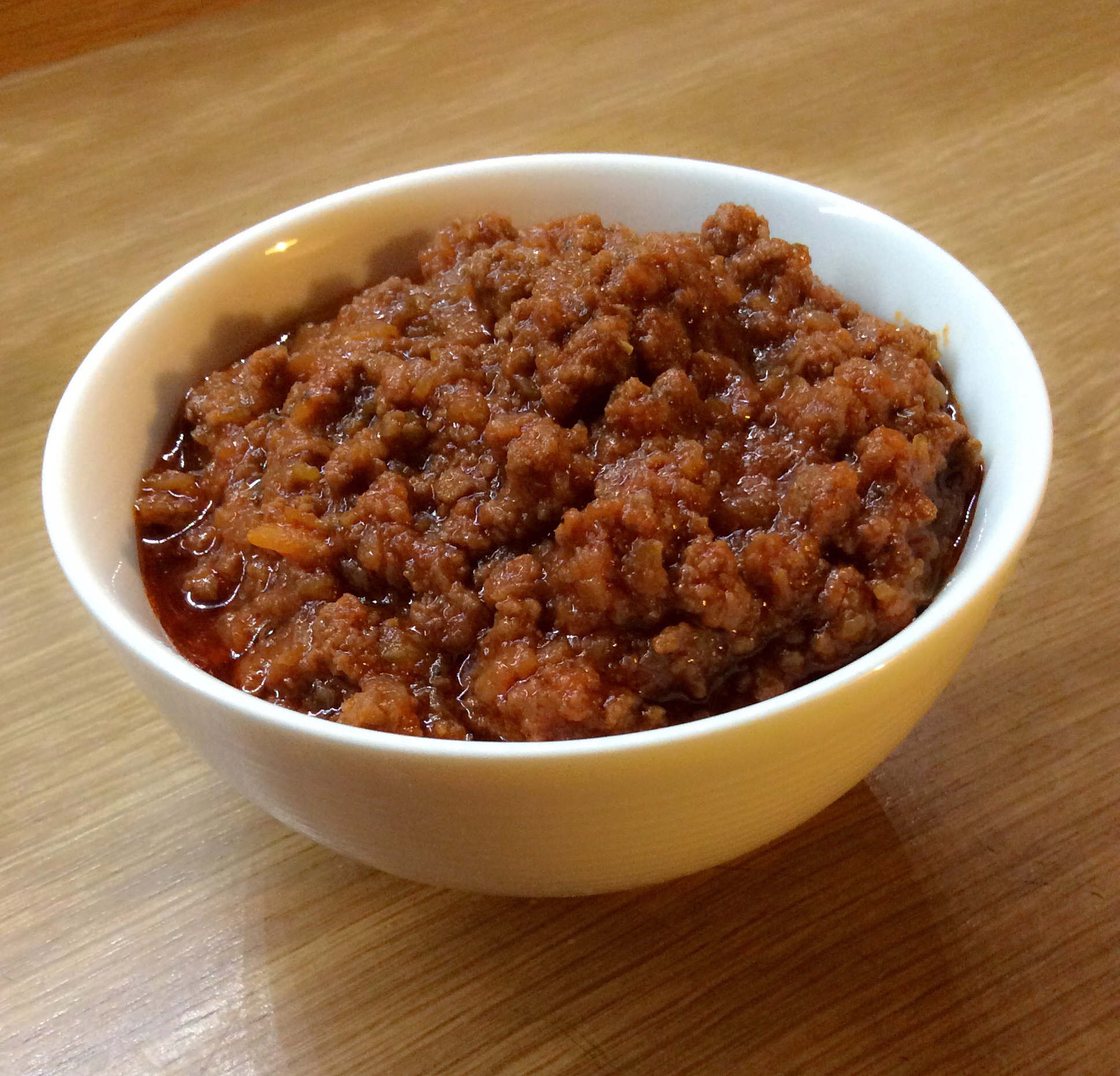
- Type: Sauce
- Place of origin: Italy
- Main ingredients: Meat, vegetables
- Variations: Bolognese sauce, Neapolitan ragù, ragù di salsiccia

In Italian cuisine, ragù (Italian: [raˈɡu]; from French ragoût) is a meat sauce commonly served with pasta. An Italian gastronomic society, Accademia Italiana della Cucina, has documented several ragù recipes. The recipes' common characteristics are the presence of meat and the fact that all are sauces for pasta. The most typical is ragù alla bolognese (Bolognese sauce). Other types include ragù alla napoletana (Neapolitan ragù), ragù di salsiccia, ragù alla barese (ragù from Bari, sometimes made with horse meat), and ragù d'anatra (a traditionally tomatoless duck ragù, from Veneto).

== Varieties ==
In northern Italian regions, ragù typically uses minced, chopped or ground meat, cooked with sauteed vegetables (soffritto) in a liquid, which traditionally include liquidized tomatoes, but also exist in tomatoless versions referred to as ragù in bianco (white ragù). The meats may include one or more of beef, chicken, pork, duck, goose, lamb, mutton, veal, or game, including their offal. The liquids can be broth, stock, water, wine, milk, cream or tomato, often in combination. In southern Italian versions such as ragù napoletano, tomatoes are used more prominently, whereas northern versions such as ragù alla bolognese typically include them in limited quantities relative to the meat, making it a meat stew rather than a tomato sauce with added meat.

In southern Italian regions, ragù is often prepared from substantial quantities of large, whole cuts of beef and pork, and sometimes regional sausages, cooked with vegetables and tomatoes. After a long braise (or simmer), the meats are removed and may be served as a separate course without pasta. Examples of these dishes are ragù alla napoletana (Neapolitan ragù) and carne al ragù.

== History ==
The term comes from the French ragoût and reached the Emilia-Romagna region in the late 18th century, perhaps following Napoleon's 1796 invasion and occupation of those northern regions.

The first ragù as a sauce, ragù per i maccheroni, was recorded by Alberto Alvisi, the cook to the Cardinal of Imola (at the time maccheroni was a general term for pasta, both dried and fresh). The recipe was replicated and published as Il Ragù del Cardinale (The Cardinal's Ragù).

After the early 1830s, recipes for ragù appear frequently in cookbooks from the Emilia-Romagna region. By the late 19th century the cost of meat saw the use of heavy meat sauces on pasta reserved to feast days and Sundays, and only among the wealthier classes of the newly unified Italy.

Independent research by Kasper and De Vita indicates that, while ragù with pasta gained popularity through the 19th century, it was largely eaten by the wealthy. However, technological advances that came with the industrial revolution at the end of the 19th century made pasta flour more affordable for the less affluent. The adoption of pasta by the common classes further expanded in the period of economic prosperity that followed World War II. According to De Vita, before World War II, 80% of the Italian rural population ate a diet based on plants; pasta was reserved for special feast days and was then often served in a legume soup.

== See also ==
- List of meat-based sauces
