= Ragù di salsiccia =

Variety of ragù

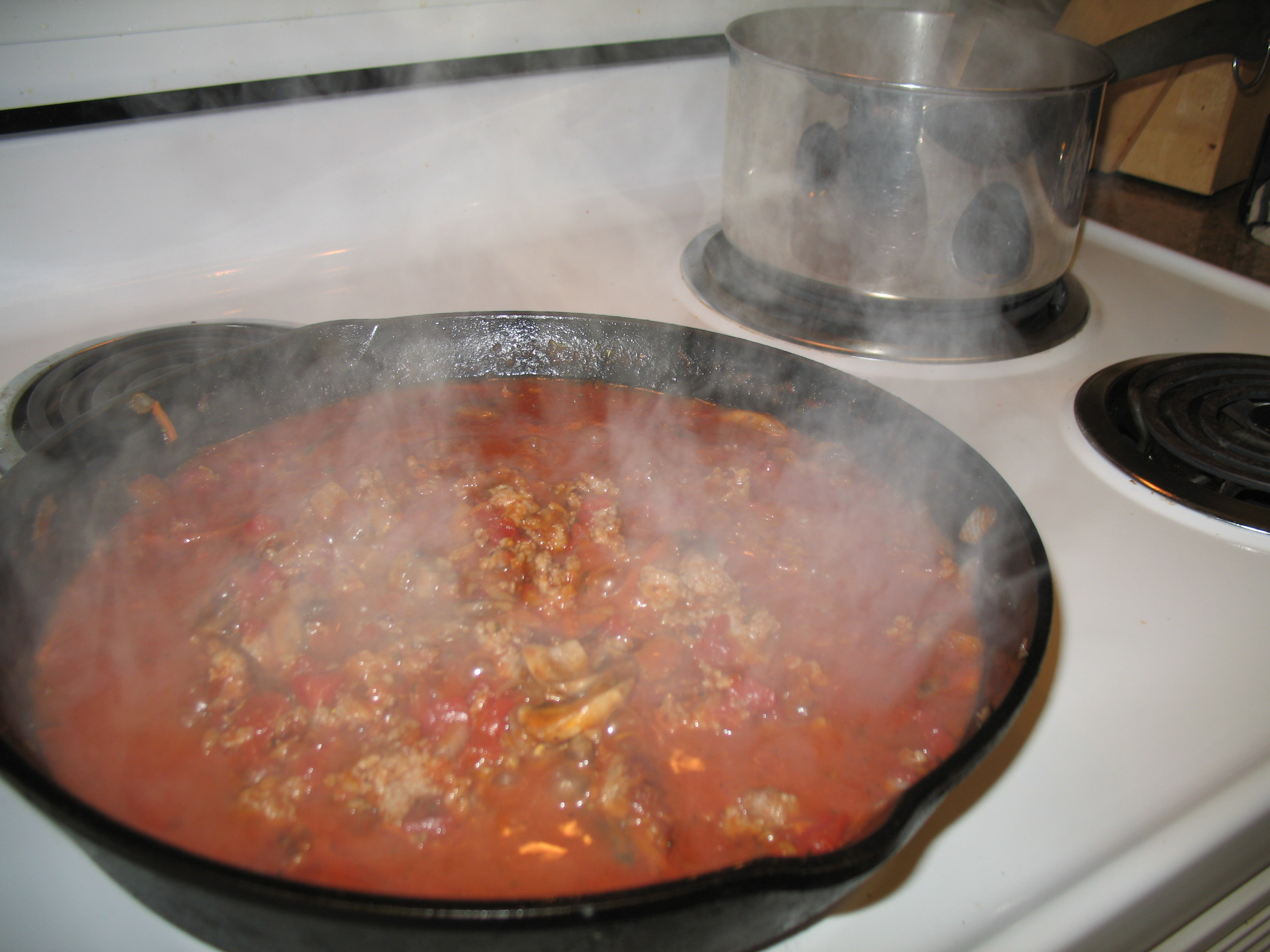
Ragù di salsiccia

Ragù di salsiccia is a variety of ragù. The primary ingredients are tomato purée or chopped tomato and sausage, and additional ingredients can include onion, shallot, carrot, celery, garlic, olive oil, red wine, rosemary, bay leaf, salt, and pepper. The sausage can be crumbled in the sauce's preparation. It may be slow-cooked under low heat for several hours.

== See also ==
- List of meat-based sauces
- List of sausage dishes
- Sausages in Italian cuisine
