= Anna Del Conte =

Italian-born food writer (born 1925)

- Born: 1925 (age 100–101); Milan, Italy
- Occupation: Food writer

Anna Del Conte (born 1925) is an Italian-born British food writer whose works cover the history of food as well as providing recipes. Resident in England since 1949, she has been influential in raising the country’s awareness of Italian cuisine: her 1976 Portrait of Pasta has been described as ‘the instrumental force in leading [the English] beyond the land of spag bol, macaroni cheese and tinned ravioli’. Still in 2009 she remained critical of ‘Britalian’ cookery, however: mixing too many ingredients and suffering from the English palate’s liking for much stronger flavours, it lacked the subtleties of its Mediterranean original.

== Life and works ==
Del Conte was born in 1925 into a prosperous and cultured Milanese family; her father was a stockbroker and Anglophile, while her mother, with whom she had a tempestuous relationship, was of ‘good aristocratic stock’. Born three years after the March on Rome, the Fascist state ideology was a consistent presence in her early life: her father's work required him to be a member of the Fascist Party, and she has recalled having to wear ‘silly armbands and uniforms otherwise you couldn’t go to school’. After spending a part of the war years in Emilia-Romagna – where twice she was arrested on suspicion of involvement with the partisans, and where she was strafed by Allied fighter aircraft while cycling on a county road – the family returned to Milan. Here, having lost most of his money, her father returned to work while she studied history at the University of Milan before moving to England in 1949 to learn English while working as an au pair. She has said that at the time food in Britain was not something you discussed but that you ate. In England, she subsequently married Oliver Waley (1925–2007), and engaged in part-time work as the couple raised a family.

In mid-life she turned to cookery writing. Her first book, Portrait of Pasta, was published in 1976. An adaptation of Marcella Hazan’s Classic Italian Cookbook for a British readership followed and in 1987 The Gastronomy of Italy, an encyclopædic work covering the topic from the Roman period to the present for which she was awarded the Duchessa Maria Luigia di Parma prize. Subsequent books included Entertaining all’Italiana (1991), shortlisted for the André Simon Award, and The Classic Food of Northern Italy (1995) which received the Orio Vergani prize from the Accademia Italiana della Cucina, as well as an award from the Guild of Food Writers. In 2009, she published Risotto with Nettles: A Memoir with Food in which she places her recipes in the context of her memories of a life in Italy and England. She has also written many articles for Sainsbury’s Magazine, winning a Glenfiddich Award in 1999.

In an interview with The Guardian, she said that she believed the British "lost their connection with good food through having had their industrial revolution so early. 'Ours came only after the second world war; until then, people had much more connection with the land.'" In that same interview, she said, "I didn't set out to be a cookery writer. I wanted to be an opera singer. However, since I did not have much musical talent, it was rather unrealistic."

In her Desert Island Discs programme, she said that her husband was her 'chief taster' because he had a British palate, so could tell her what she could expect her readers to feel. She mentioned that she never did any TV cooking series because she felt she came over as a cold person and expressed her view that whatever you do you shouldn't serve bolognese with spaghetti as it's just the wrong shape – tagliatelle is much better. On 22 December 2016 BBC2 aired a programme, 'The Cook Who Changed Our Lives', narrated by Nigella Lawson about Anna's life and impact on British cooking.

Del Conte was awarded the honour of Ufficiale dell'Ordine al merito della Repubblica Italiana on 2 June 2010. It was proposed to the President by the Italian Ambassador, Giancarlo Aragona, and the honour was given in recognition of the importance of Anna Del Conte's work in keeping alive Italy's good image in the UK.

Del Conte's other books include: Secrets of an Italian Kitchen, Entertaining All'Italiana and Cooking with Coco.
