= Pappardelle =

Type of pasta

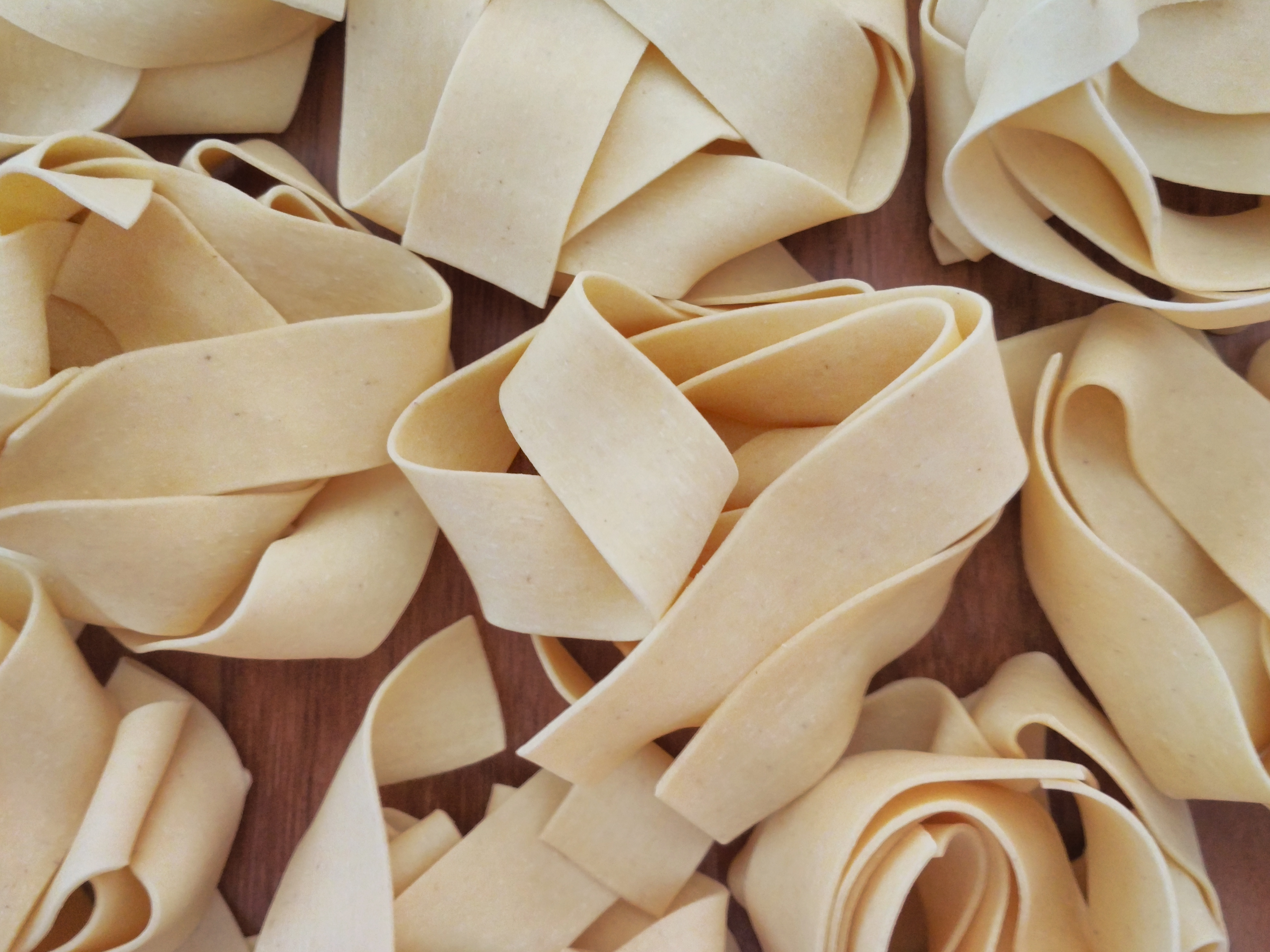
- Type: Pasta
- Place of origin: Italy
- Region or state: Tuscany

Pappardelle (Italian: [papparˈdɛlle]; sing.: pappardella; from the Italian verb pappare, meaning 'to gobble up') are large, very broad, flat pasta, similar to wide fettuccine, originating from the Tuscany region of Italy. The fresh types are two to three centimetres (3/4–1 inches) wide and may have fluted edges, while dried egg pappardelle have straight sides.

The dried pasta is typically sold in nests in order to protect the pasta from breakage and ensure the pasta separates when boiled in water.

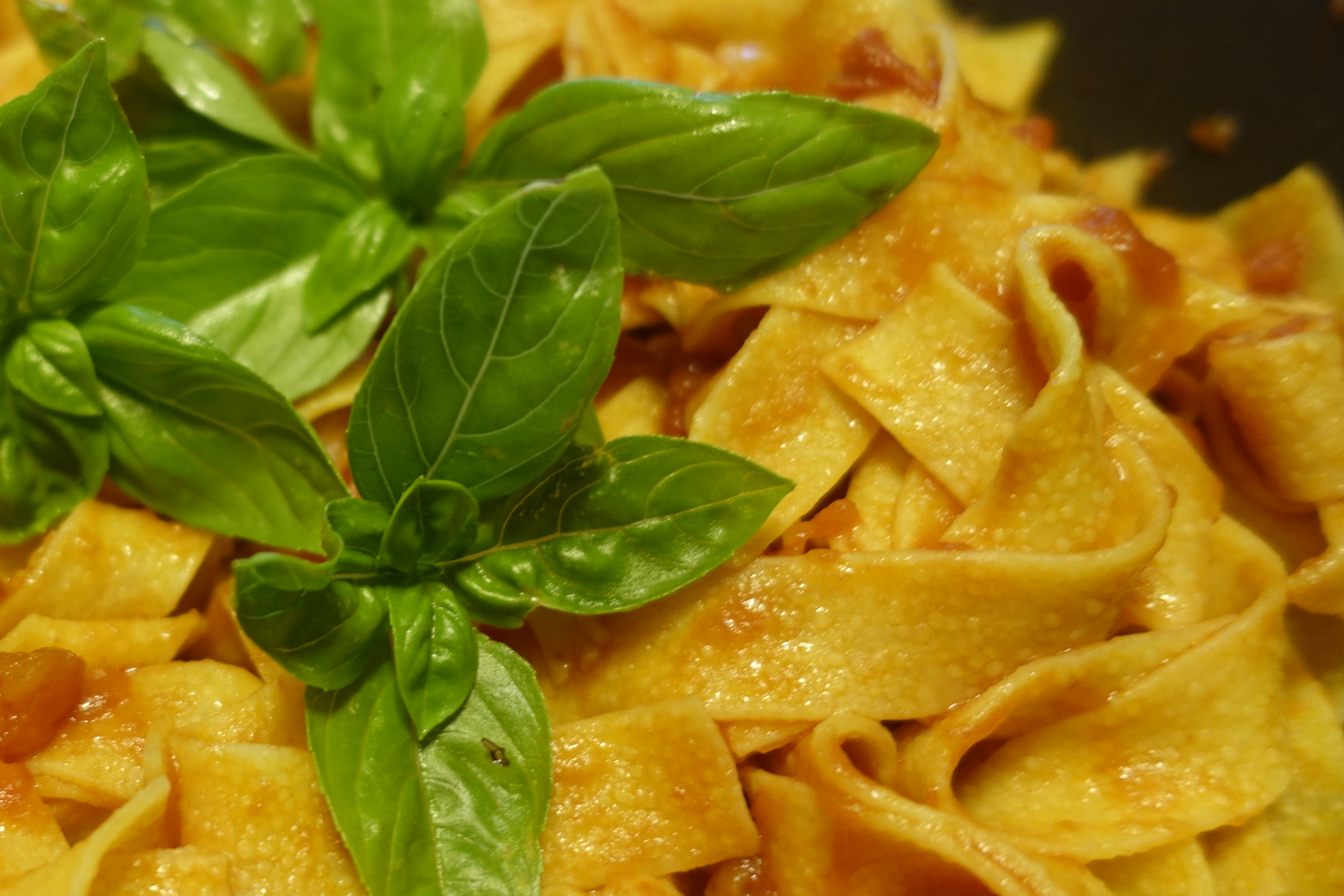
Pappardelle with basil

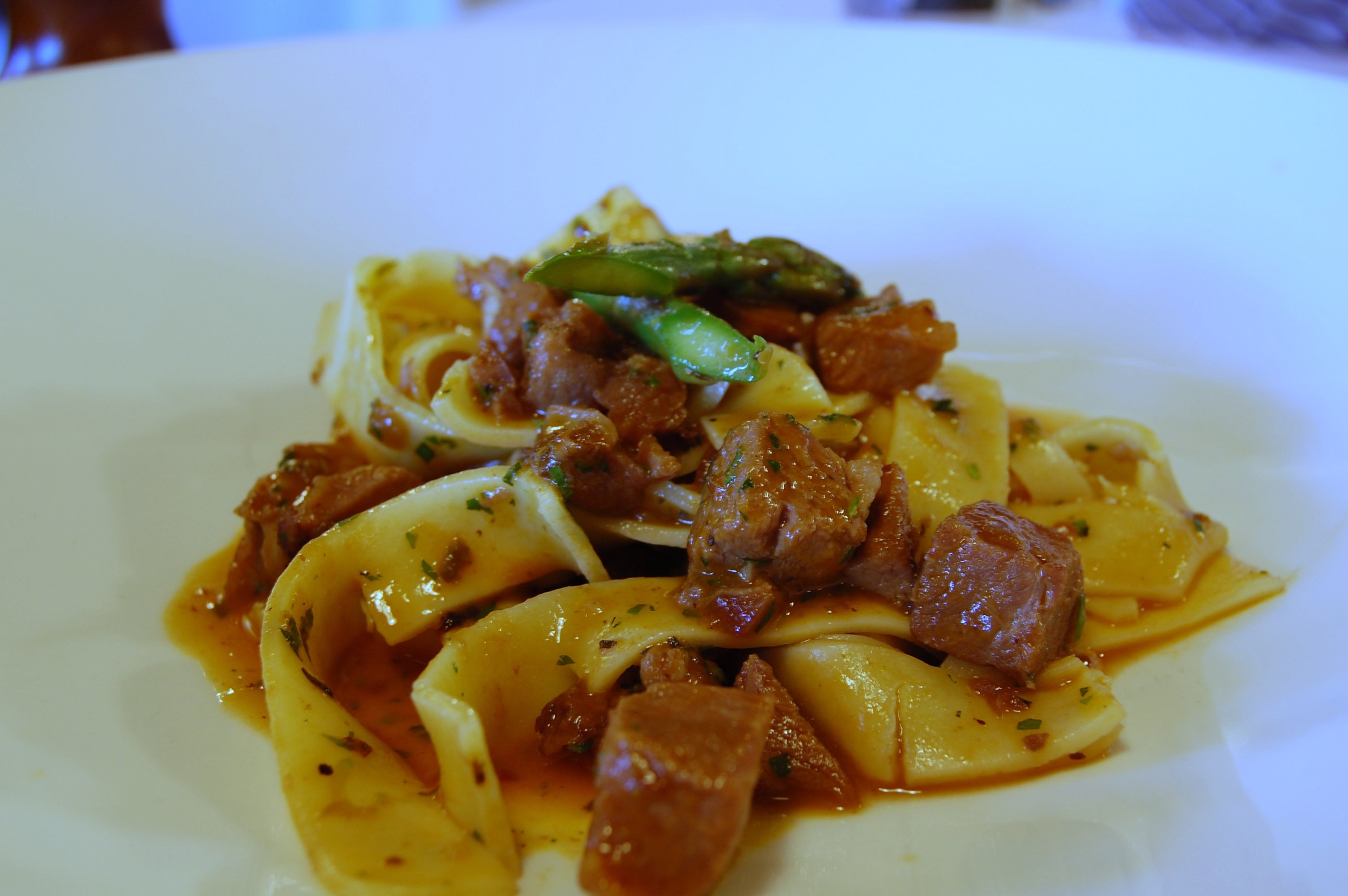
Lamb Pappardelle

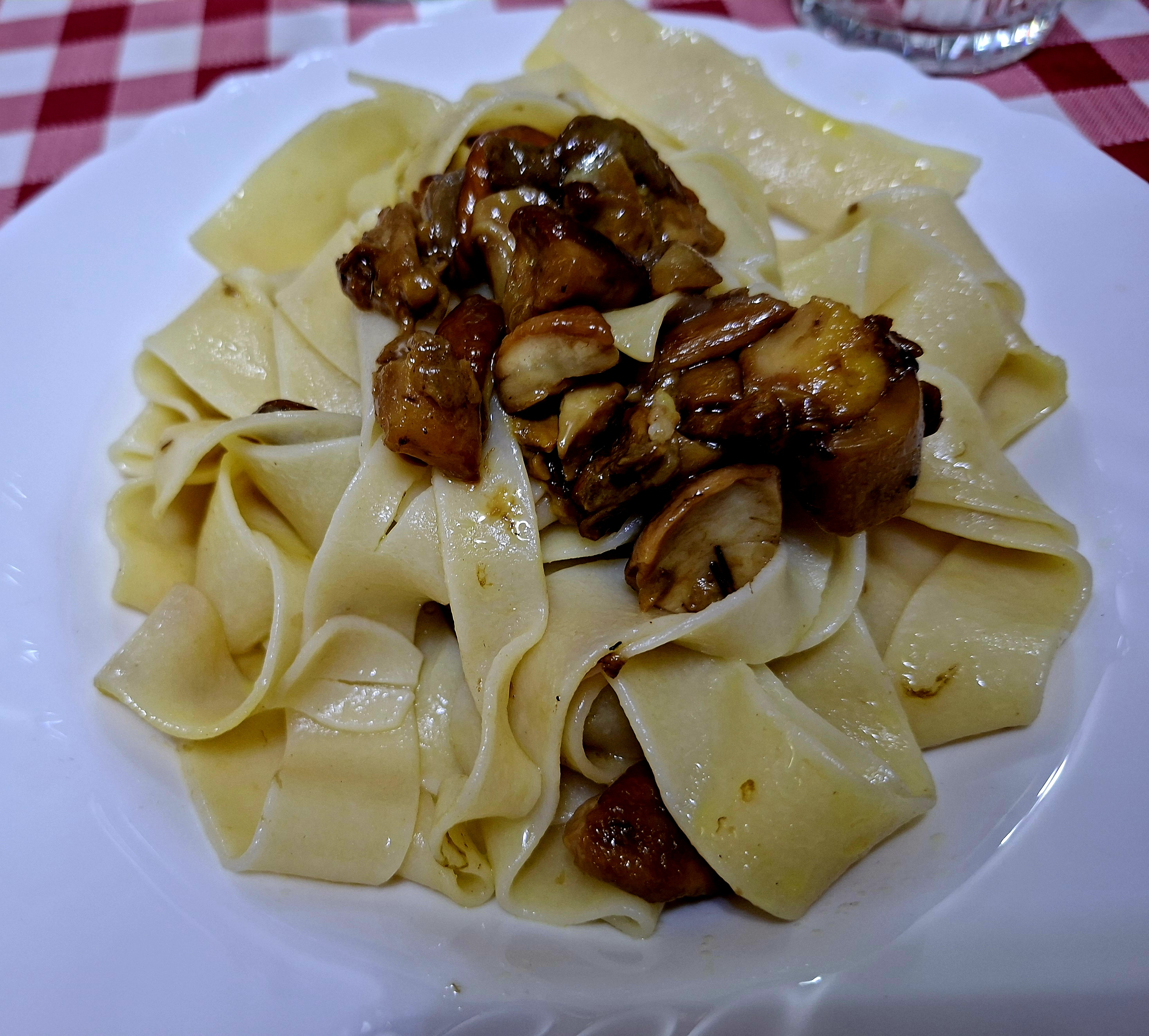
Pappardelle con funghi porcini

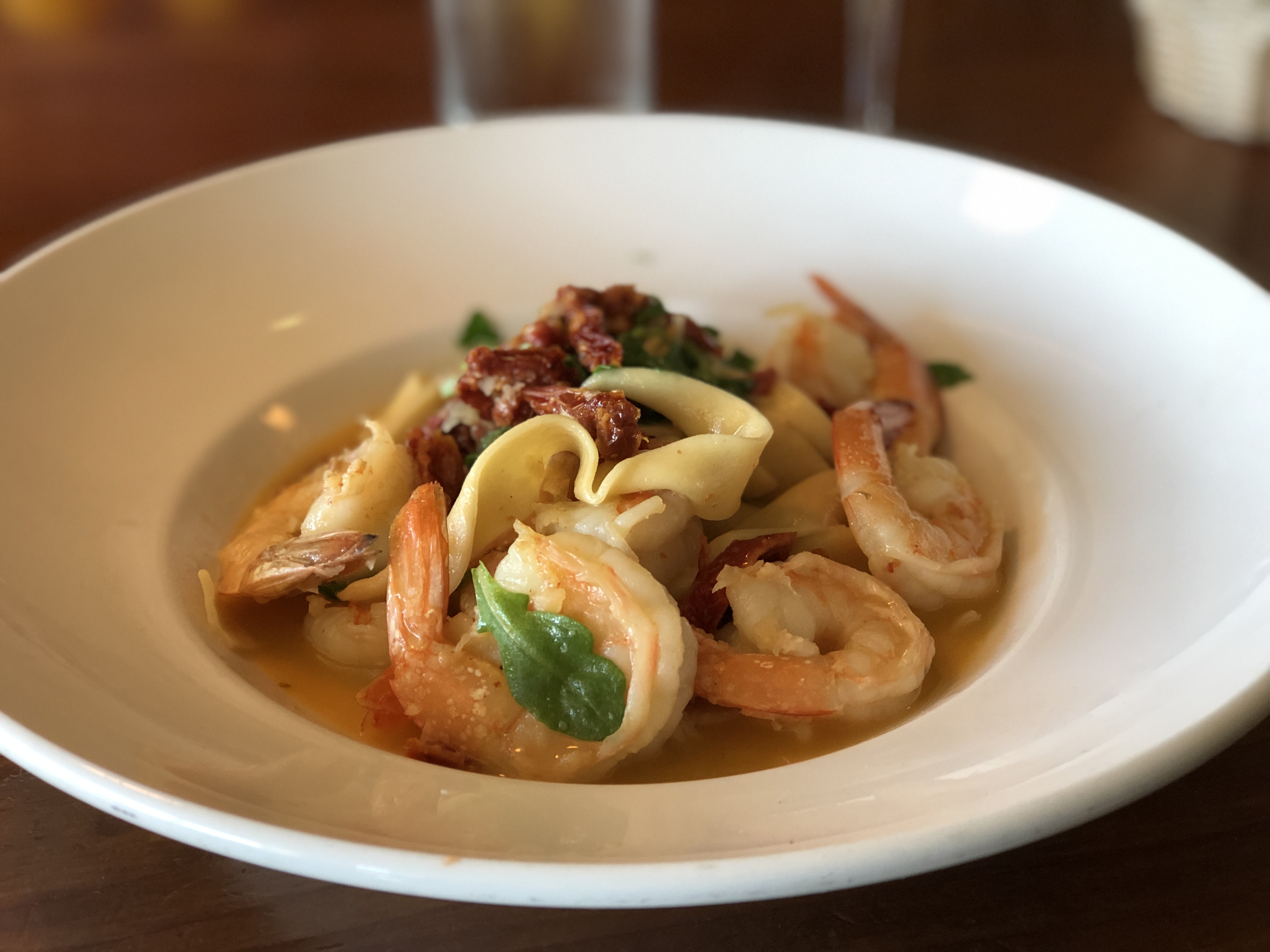
Pappardelle with tiger prawns and lobster sauce

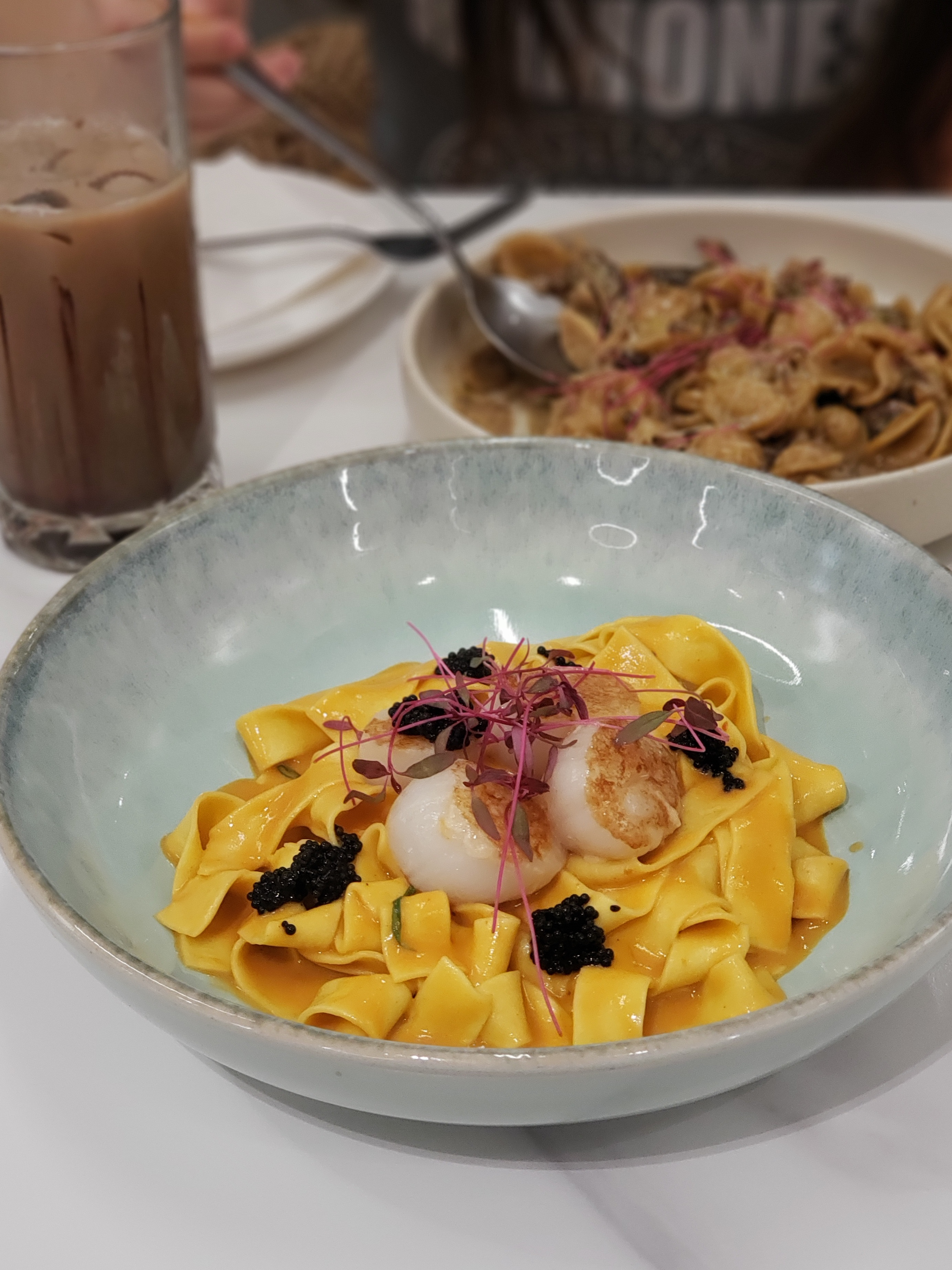
Pappardelle with Scallops, Lumpfish Caviar, Lobster sauce

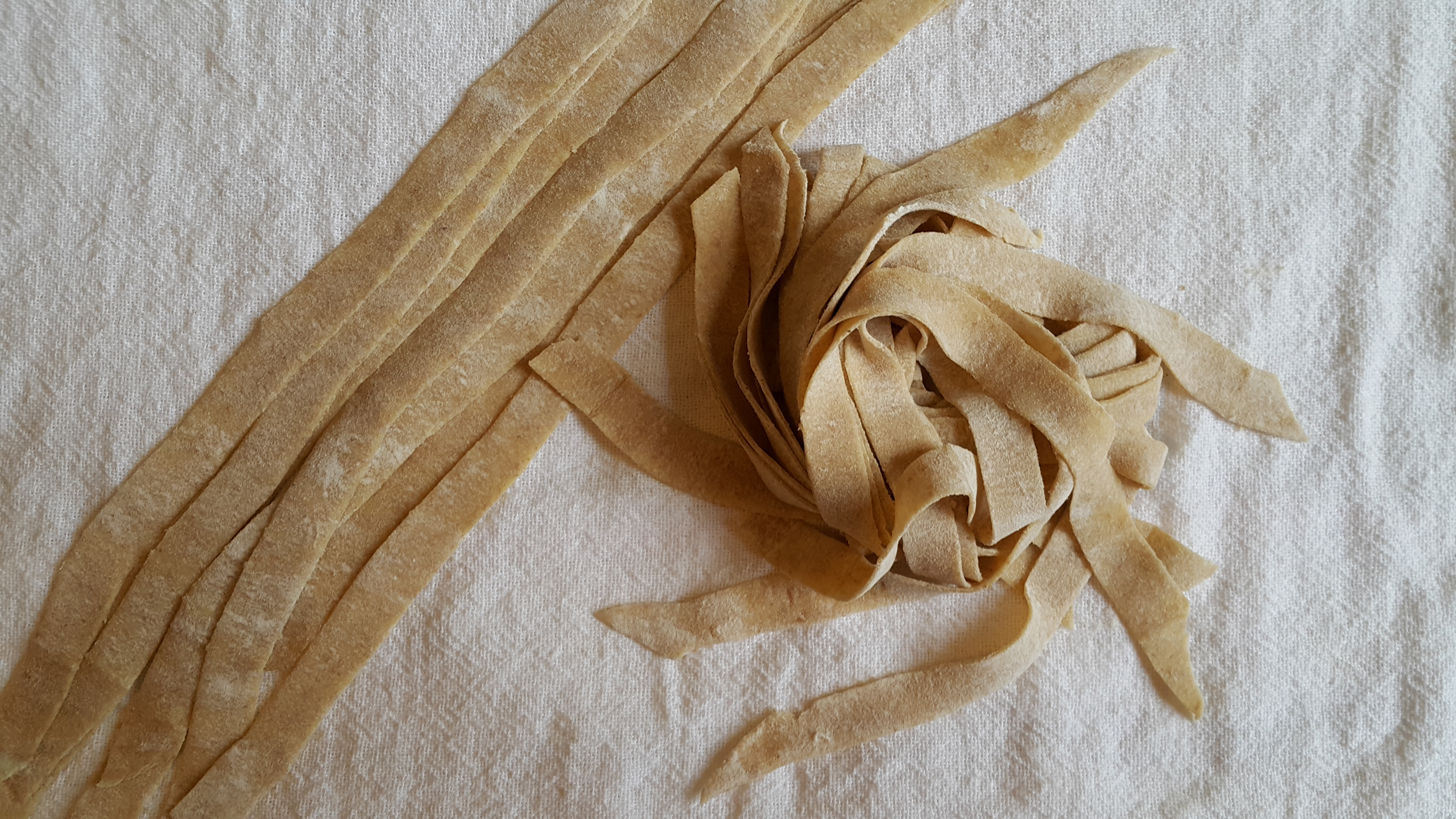
Homemade whole wheat pappardelle

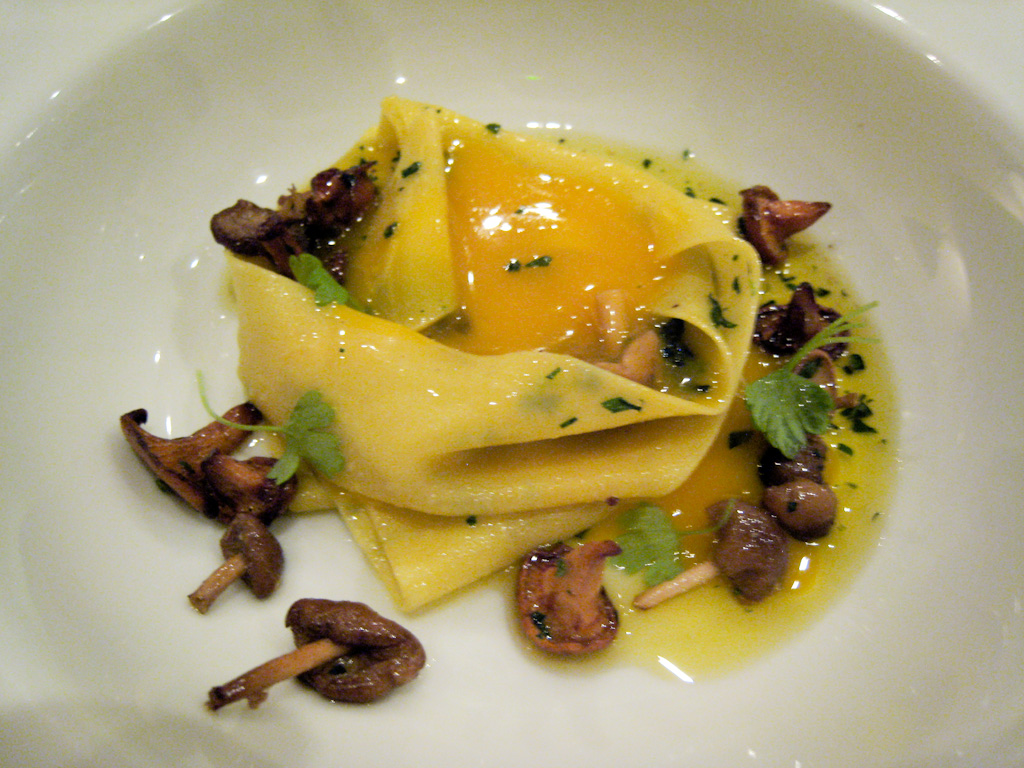
Pappardelle, egg yolk, wild mushrooms

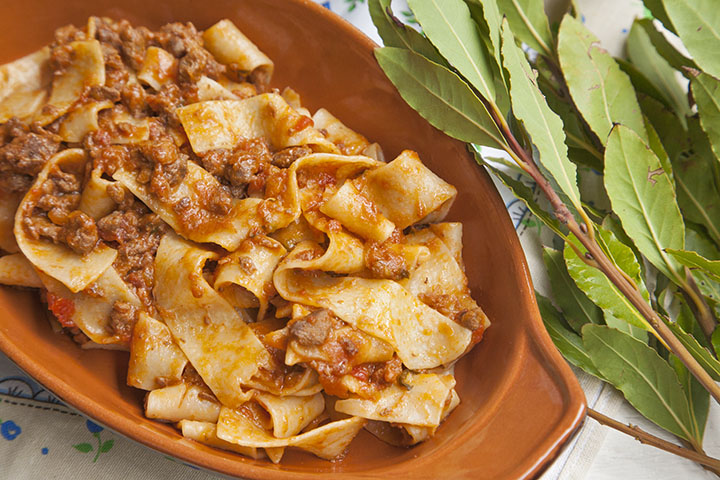
Pappardelle ternane al cinghiale

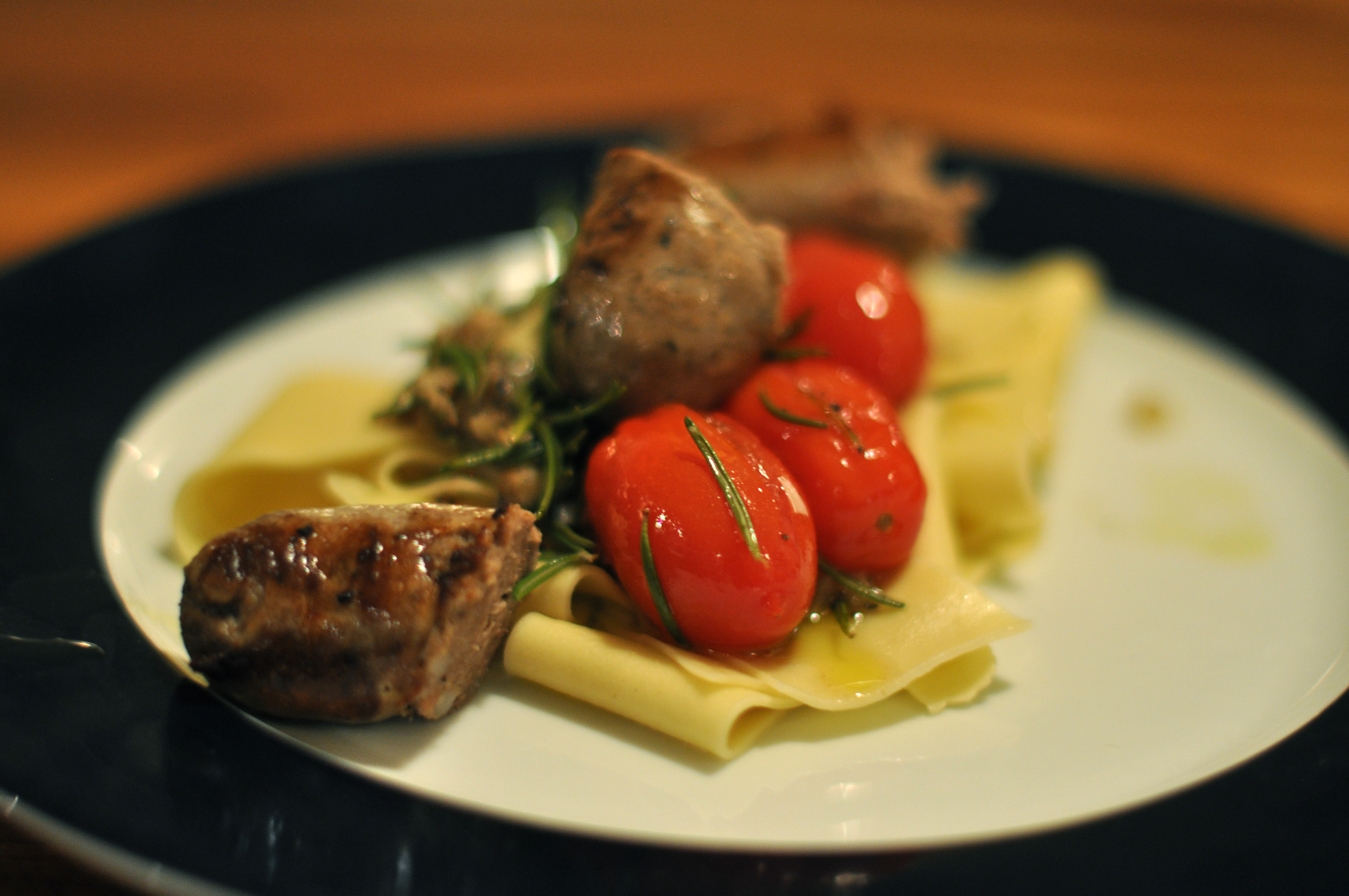
Pappardelle with fried tomatoes and veal sausages

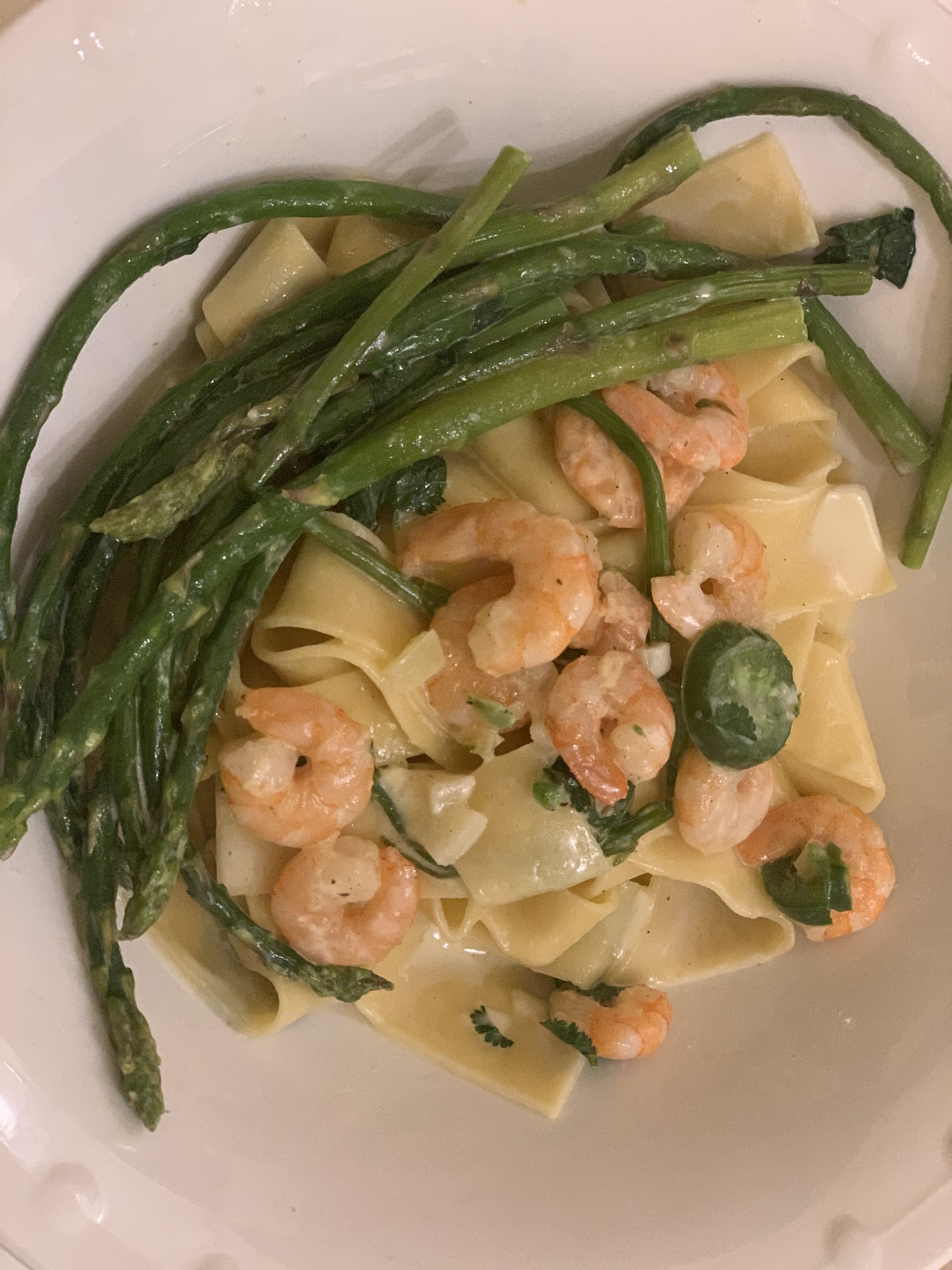
Pappardelle with Shrimp and Asparagus

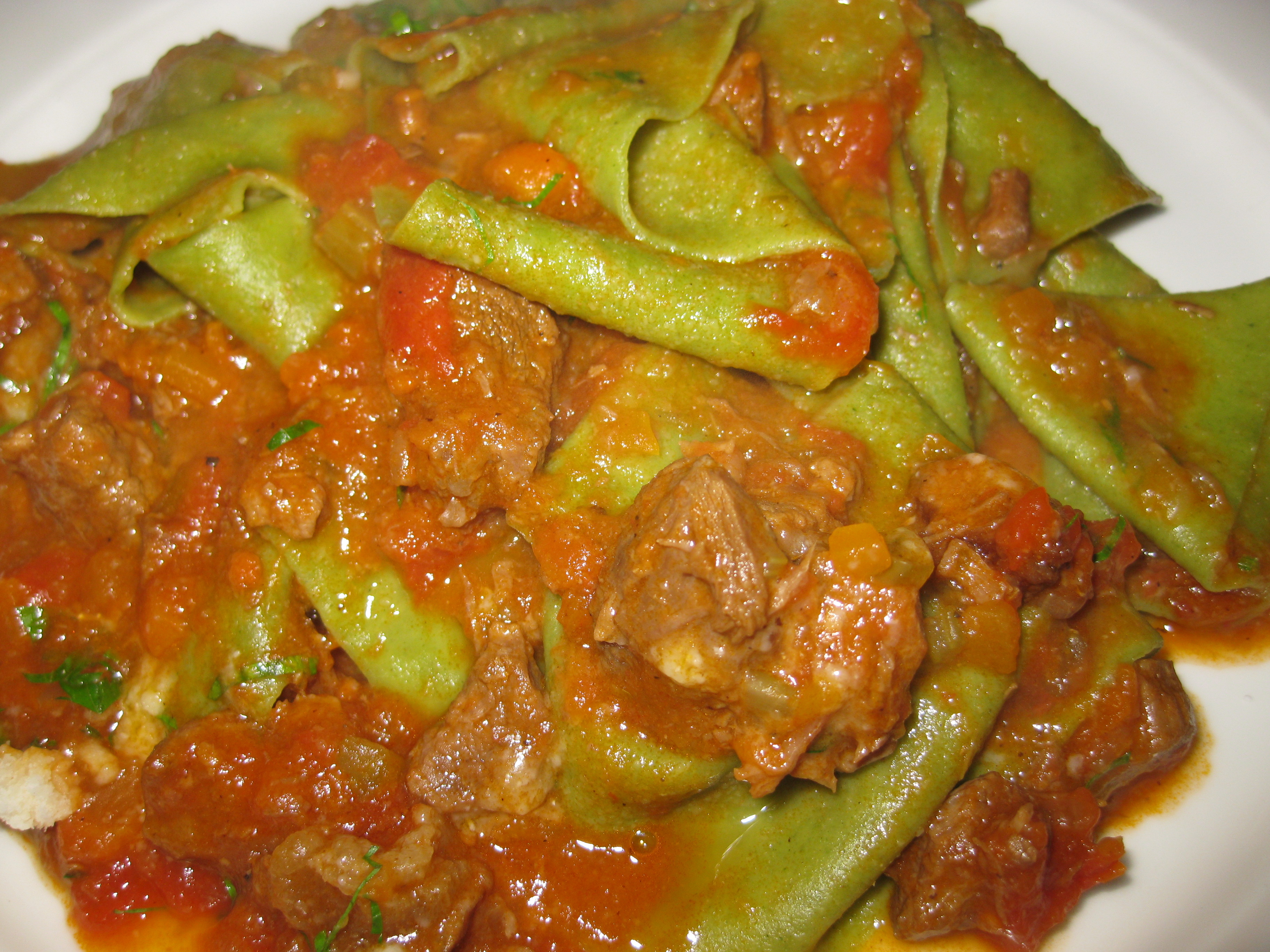
Pappardelle with Boar Ragu

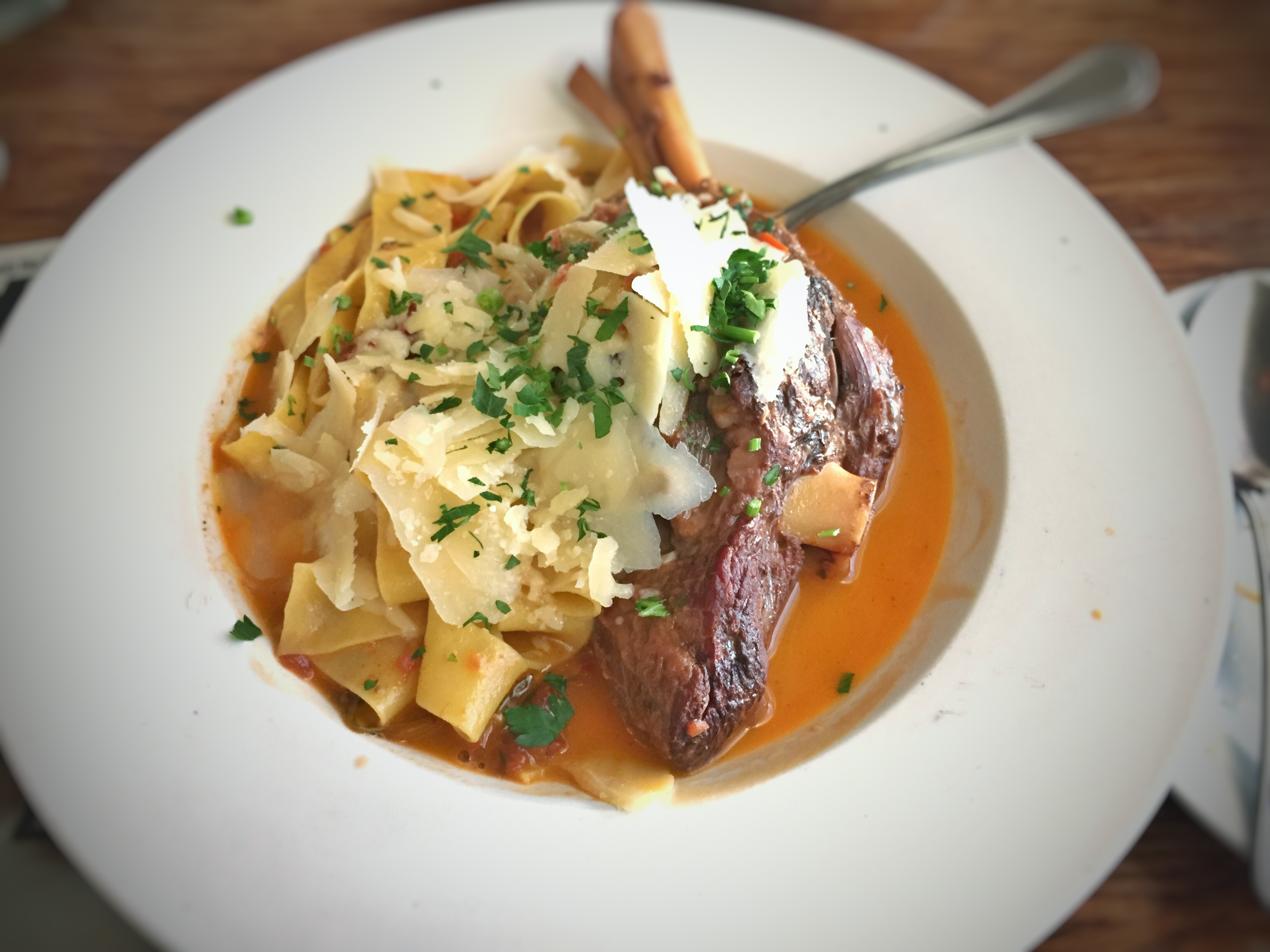
Lamb osso bucco and pappardelle

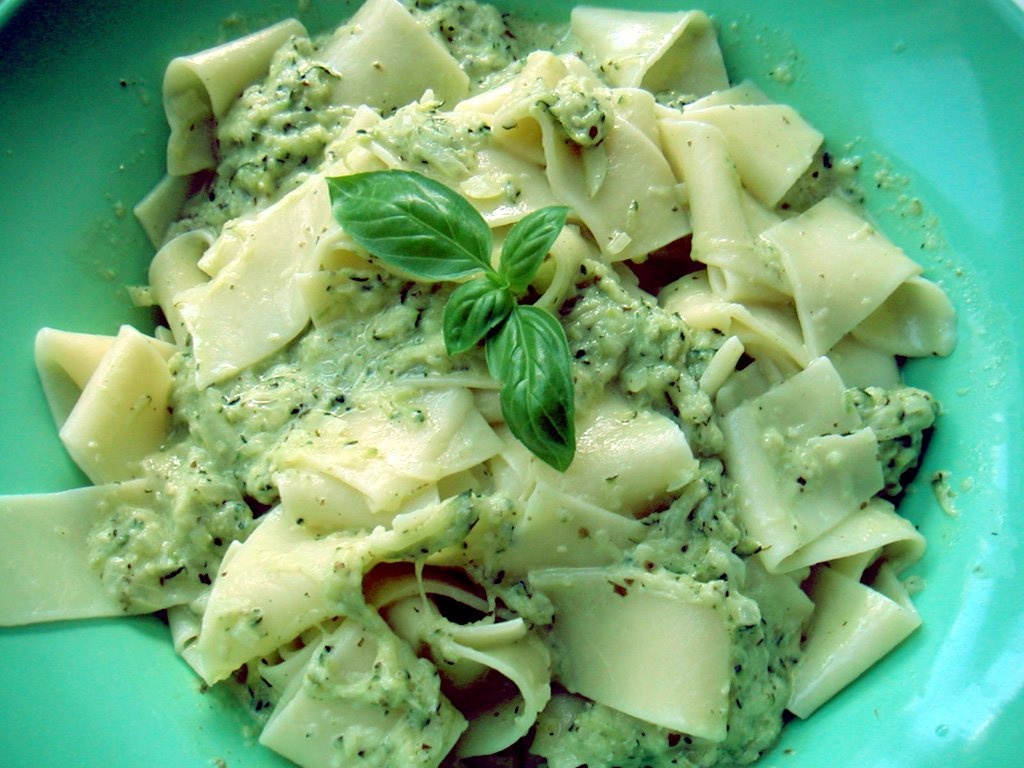
Pesto pappardelle

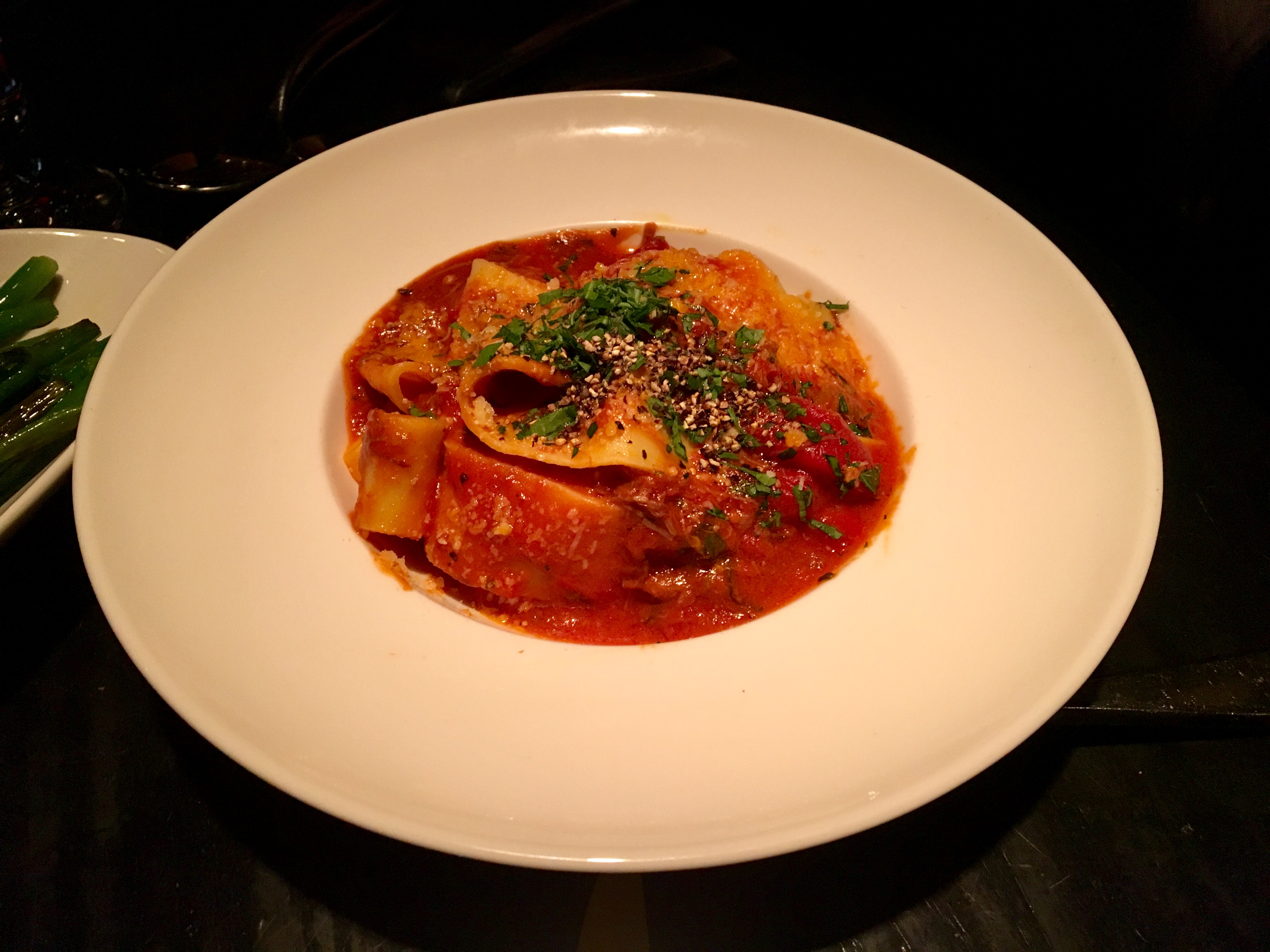
Pappardelle pomodoro

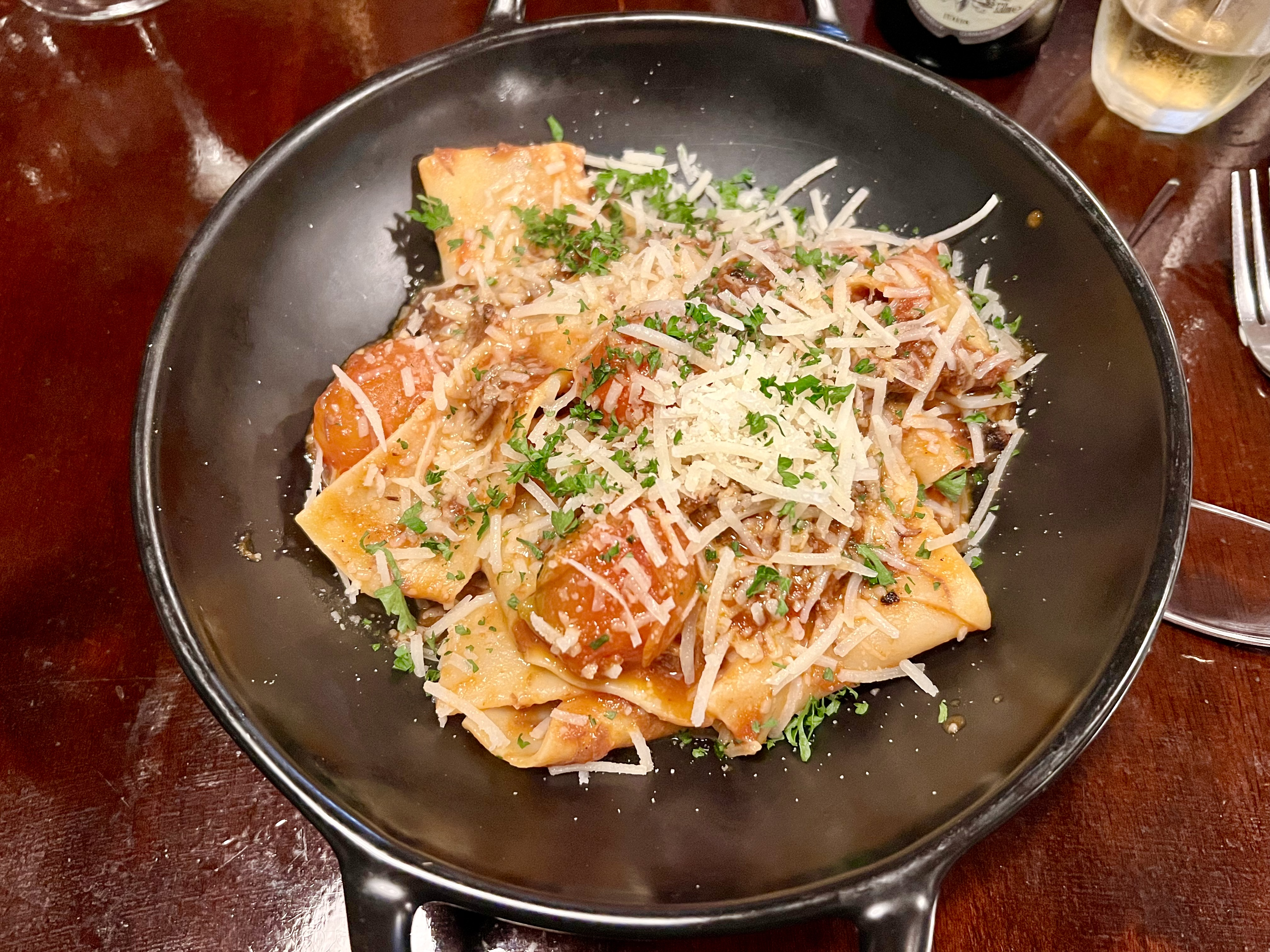
Pappardelle with beef cheek ragu

== See also ==
Media related to Pappardelle at Wikimedia Commons

- List of pasta
