= Fabio Parasecoli =

Italian academic and author

- Born: 1964 (age 61–62); Rome, Italy
- Education: Sapienza University of Rome (1988), University of Naples "L'Orientale" (1991) and Hohenheim University (2009)
- Occupations: Academic and author
- Website: fabioparasecoli.com

Fabio Parasecoli (born in 1964) is an Italian academic and author, whose work focusses on the intersectionality of food, media and politics. He is currently a Food Studies professor at NYU Steinhardt.

Parasecoli was born in Rome, and studied contemporary Chinese history for two years in Beijing University under a graduate fellowship before obtaining a PhD in agricultural sciences with a focus on gender and nutrition from Hohenheim University. He moved to the United States of America in 1998, initially working as the US correspondent for Gambero Rosso. He later worked as a professor at The New School, before moving to NYU Steinhardt. His 2008 book Bite Me! Food in Popular Culture was praised as "a necessary addition to the analysis of the popular and the edible". His writing style has been criticized as being excessively complicated. In 2018, Parasecoli started a three year long research project examining the renewed interest towards traditional, local and regional food in Poland through a grant received from the National Science Centre. In 2022 he received a grant from the Spanish Ministry of Culture and Sport for a project on cultural heritage and design.

== Books ==
- Libano: Ritorno al Paradiso (1996). Liber Internazionale Press ISBN 978-8880040422
- Food Culture in Italy (2004). Greenwood Publishing Group ISBN 978-0313327261
- Bite Me: Food in Popular Culture (2008). Bloomsbury Publishing ISBN 9781847884534
- Al Dente: A History of Food in Italy (2014). Reaktion Books ISBN 978-1780232768
- Feasting Our Eyes: Food Films and Cultural Identity in the United States (2016; co-authored with Laura Lindenfeld). Columbia University Press ISBN 978-0231172509
- Knowing Where It Comes From: Labeling Traditional Foods to Compete in a Global Market (2017). University of Iowa Press ISBN 9781609385330
- Food (The MIT Press Essential Knowledge series) (2019). MIT Press ISBN 978-0262537315
- Global Brooklyn: Designing food experiences in world cities (2021; co-edited with Mateusz Halawa). MIT Press ISBN 978-1350144477
- Gastronativism: Food, Identity, Politics (2022). Columbia University Press ISBN 978-0231202077
- The Pierogi Problem: Reinventing Polish Food for Cosmopolitan Appetites (2025, co-authored with Agata Bachórz and Mateusz Halawa). California University Press ISBN 9780520399068
