= Naples at Table =

1998 book on Campanian cuisine

Naples at Table: Cooking in Campania
- Author: Arthur Schwartz
- Language: English
- Publisher: HarperCollins
- Publication date: 1998
- Publication place: United States
- ISBN: 978-0-060-18261-8

Naples at Table: Cooking in Campania is a 1998 cookbook by the American food writer and radio personality Arthur Schwartz. Published by HarperCollins, the book details the cuisine of Campania, a region in southern Italy that has the city of Naples as its capital. Across its pages, Schwartz allotted substantial space to pasta and pizza, dishes popularly associated with the region. Other classes of dishes covered included desserts, fried foods, and meat. In all, Naples at Table contains 250 recipes.

Naples at Table was published at a time when American publishers were releasing numerous books on Mediterranean and particularly Italian cooking, marketing them as promoting weight loss. Simultaneously, Naples at Table came as a wave of what John F. Mariani described as "authoritative ethnic works on regional cookery of various parts of the world, especially Italy and France" ended. The cuisine of southern Italy had been little covered in these cookbooks, and its elements were poorly understood among American readers. With the book's publication, Neapolitan cuisine became a trend in New York, and Italian restaurants responded by modifying their menus.

In Great Books for Cooks, a 1999 Ballantine Books publication, Naples at Table was complimented for its research and "reporterly" approach. Anecdotes and the section on desserts were praised in Publishers Weekly as entertaining. Anne Mendelson in Gourmet magazine gave the book an enthusiastic review, describing it as "Arthur Schwartz's king-size introduction to Italian cooking", and characterized its content on Campania and recipes as equally engaging. The review closed with the proclamation "This is as close as you can get to total immersion in Naples by reading and cooking." In the Los Angeles Times, assessments of the book as entertaining and engaging were agreed with, and additional descriptors of "funny, thoughtful, and unabashedly personal" were provided. Further positive reviews came from Nach Waxman in the 2000 Alfred A. Knopf publication The New Cooks' Catalogue, the Chicago Tribune, and the trade publication Nation's Restaurant News.

The book was praised by the food writers John Thorne, Carla Capalbo, Erica De Mane, and Jeffrey Steingarten. It was nominated for a James Beard Cookbook Award in the International Category and spent at least two weeks on the Los Angeles Times Cookbook Hot List.

== See also ==
- List of Italian foods and drinks
- Neapolitan cuisine

Italian cookbooks:

- Il cucchiaio d'argento - The Silver Spoon
- Il talismano della felicità - The Talisman of Happiness by Ada Boni
