= Bolognese sauce =

Main variety of ragù in Italian cuisine

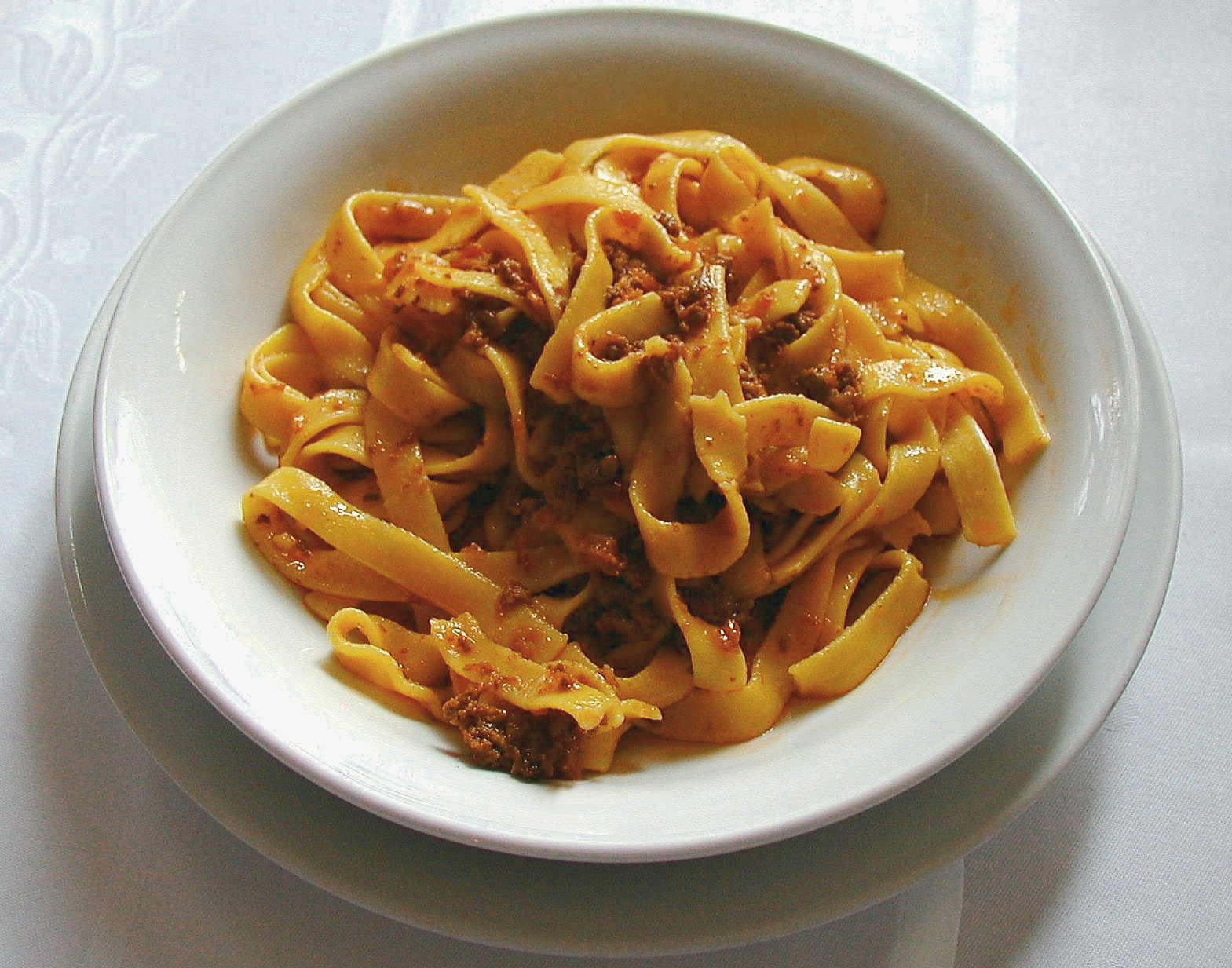
- Tagliatelle al ragù
- Alternative names: Ragù alla bolognese or ragù bolognese (Italian), ragó (Emilian)
- Type: Ragù
- Place of origin: Italy
- Region or state: Bologna, Emilia-Romagna
- Main ingredients: Ground meat (beef or veal, pork) or pancetta, soffritto (celery, carrot, onion), tomato paste, wine, milk

Bolognese sauce, (Note: UK: /ˌbɒləˈneɪz, ˌbɒləˈnɛz/ BOL-ə-NAYZ, BOL-ə-NEZ, US: /ˌboʊlənˈjeɪz, ˌboʊləˈniːz/ BOH-lən-YAYZ, BOH-lə-NEEZ.) known in Italian as ragù alla bolognese (Note: pronounced [raˈɡu alla boloɲˈɲeːze, -eːse].) or ragù bolognese (in Bologna simply ragù; Bolognese dialect: ragó), is the main variety of ragù in Italian cuisine, typical of the city of Bologna.

Ragù alla bolognese is a slowly cooked meat-based sauce, and its preparation involves several techniques, including sweating, sautéing, and braising. Ingredients include a characteristic soffritto of onion, celery, and carrot, and different types of minced or finely chopped beef, often alongside small amounts of fatty pork. White wine, milk, and a small amount of tomato paste or tomato sauce are added, and the dish is then gently simmered at length to produce a thick sauce. Ragù alla bolognese is customarily used to dress tagliatelle al ragù and to prepare lasagne alla bolognese.

Outside Italy, the phrase "Bolognese sauce" is often used to refer to a tomato-based sauce to which minced meat has been added; such sauces typically bear little resemblance to Italian ragù alla bolognese, being more similar in fact to ragù alla napoletana from the tomato-rich south of the country. Although in Italy ragù alla bolognese is not used with spaghetti (but rather with flat pasta, such as tagliatelle), in Anglophone countries, "spaghetti bolognese" has become a popular dish.

== History ==
The origins of the Bolognese ragù are related to those of the French ragout, a stew of ingredients reduced to small pieces, which became popular in the 18th century.

The earliest documented recipe for a ragù served with pasta dates back to the end of the 18th century in Imola, near Bologna, from Alberto Alvisi, cook of the local Cardinal Barnaba Chiaramonti, later Pope Pius VII.

In 1891, Pellegrino Artusi published a recipe for a ragù characterized as bolognese in his cookbook. Since Artusi recorded and subsequently published his recipe for maccheroni alla bolognese, what is now ragù alla bolognese has evolved with the cuisine of the region. Most notable is the preferred choice of pasta, which today is widely recognized as fresh tagliatelle. Another reflection of the evolution of the cuisine since its inception is the addition of tomato, either as a puree or as a concentrated paste.

In 1982, the Italian Academy of Cuisine, an organization dedicated to preserving the culinary heritage of Italy, recorded and deposited a recipe for "classic Bolognese ragù" with the Bologna Chamber of Commerce. A version of the academy's recipe for American kitchens was also published. A new version of the classic recipe was published in 2023 by the Italian Academy of Cuisine; this new version was also deposited in the Bologna Chamber of Commerce.

Nowadays, there are many slight variations of the recipe even among native Italian chefs, and the repertoire has been further broadened by some American chefs known for their expertise in Italian cuisine.

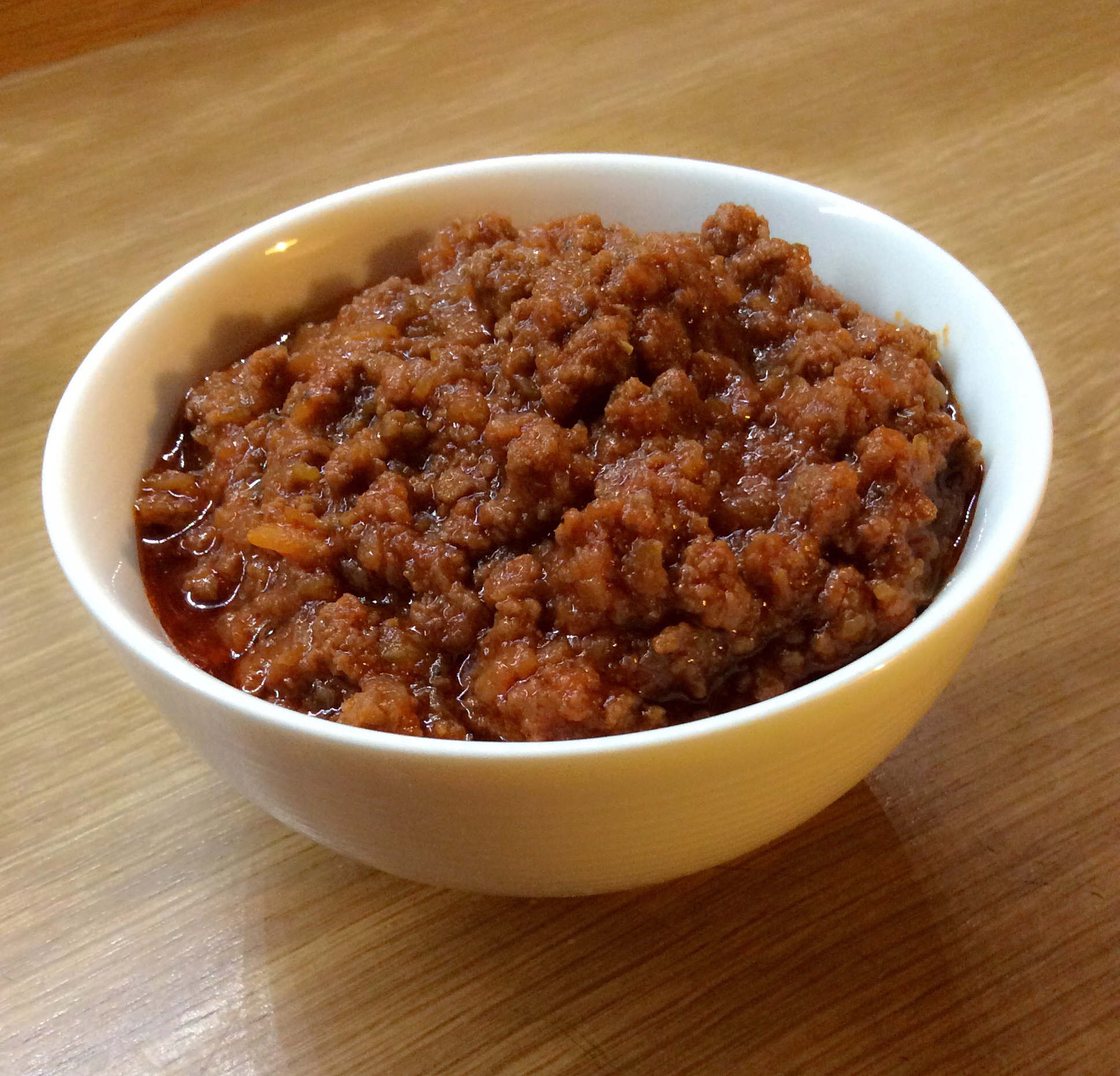
A bowl of ragù alla bolognese

The numerous variations among recipes for ragù alla bolognese have led many to search for the definitive, authentic recipe. Some have suggested the recipe registered by the Accademia Italiana della Cucina in 1982 as the "most authentic".

According to UK cookbook author and food writer Felicity Cloake, "The fact is that there is no definitive recipe for a Bolognese meat sauce, but to be worthy of the name, it should respect the traditions of the area."

== Traditional service and use ==
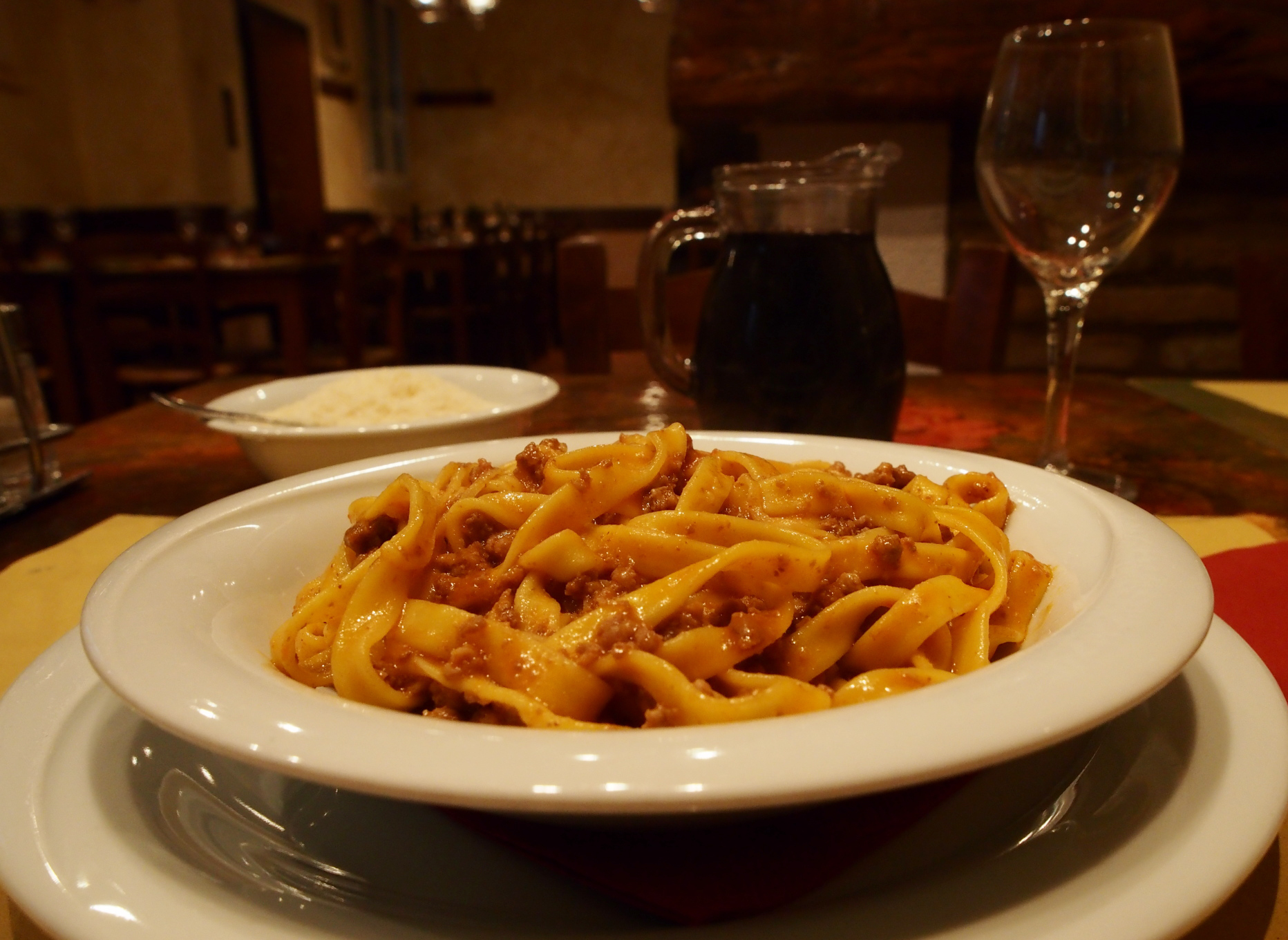
Tagliatelle al ragù as served in Bologna

In Bologna, ragù is traditionally paired and served with tagliatelle made with eggs and northern Italy's soft wheat flour. Acceptable alternatives to fresh tagliatelle include other broad flat pasta shapes, such as pappardelle or fettuccine, and tube shapes, such as rigatoni and penne. While the combination of the ragù with fresh tagliatelle remains the most traditional and authentic in the Bolognese cuisine, some—such as Piero Valdiserra—have argued in favor of capitalizing on its internationally widespread combination with spaghetti, even by attempting to portray it as not entirely foreign to local tradition.

Ragù alla bolognese, along with béchamel sauce, is also used to prepare lasagne alla bolognese.

=== International Day of Italian Cuisines 2010 ===
Gruppo Virtuale Cuochi Italiani (GVCI), an international organization and network of culinary professionals dedicated to authentic Italian cuisine, annually organizes and promotes an International Day of Italian Cuisines (IDIC). In 2010, tagliatelle al ragù was the official dish for IDIC. The event, held on January 17, 2010, included participation by 450 professional chefs in 50 countries who prepared the signature dish according to an authentic recipe provided by chef Mario Caramella. Media coverage was broad internationally, but reports often incorrectly identified the recipe followed as that of Accademia Italiana della Cucina, and some included stock photographs of spaghetti bolognese.

== Spaghetti bolognese ==
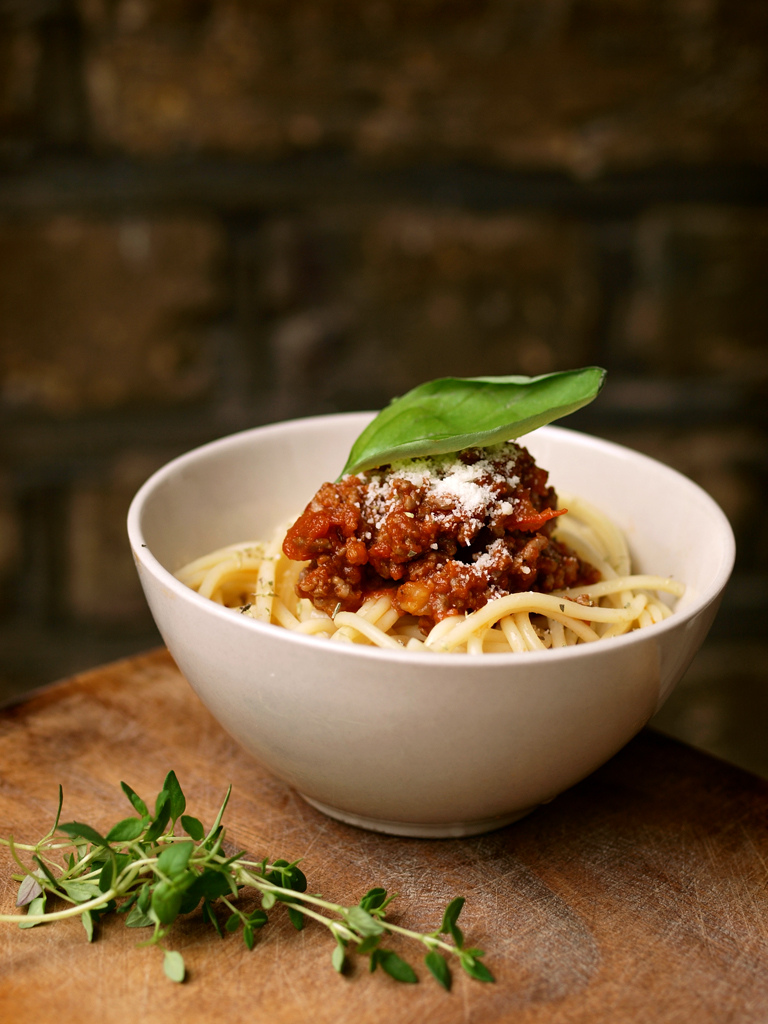
Spaghetti bolognese

Spaghetti bolognese is a popular pasta dish outside Italy, although not part of Italian cuisine. The dish is generally perceived as inauthentic by Italians.

The origins of the dish are unclear, but it may have evolved in the context of early 20th-century emigration of southern Italians to the Americas (particularly the United States) as a sort of fusion influenced by the tomato-rich style of Neapolitan ragù, or it may have developed in immigrant restaurants in Britain in the post-war era. The first mention of this combination appeared in the book Practical Italian recipes for American kitchens, written by Julia Lovejoy Cuniberti in 1917, and published to raise funds for the families of Italian soldiers, at the time fighting in World War I. In the book, Bolognese sauce is recommended for "macaroni or spaghetti", which were already widespread in the United States (tagliatelle, which is traditionally made fresh and difficult to export, was less common).

== See also ==
- List of meat-based sauces
