= Sausages in Italian cuisine =

Italian sausage
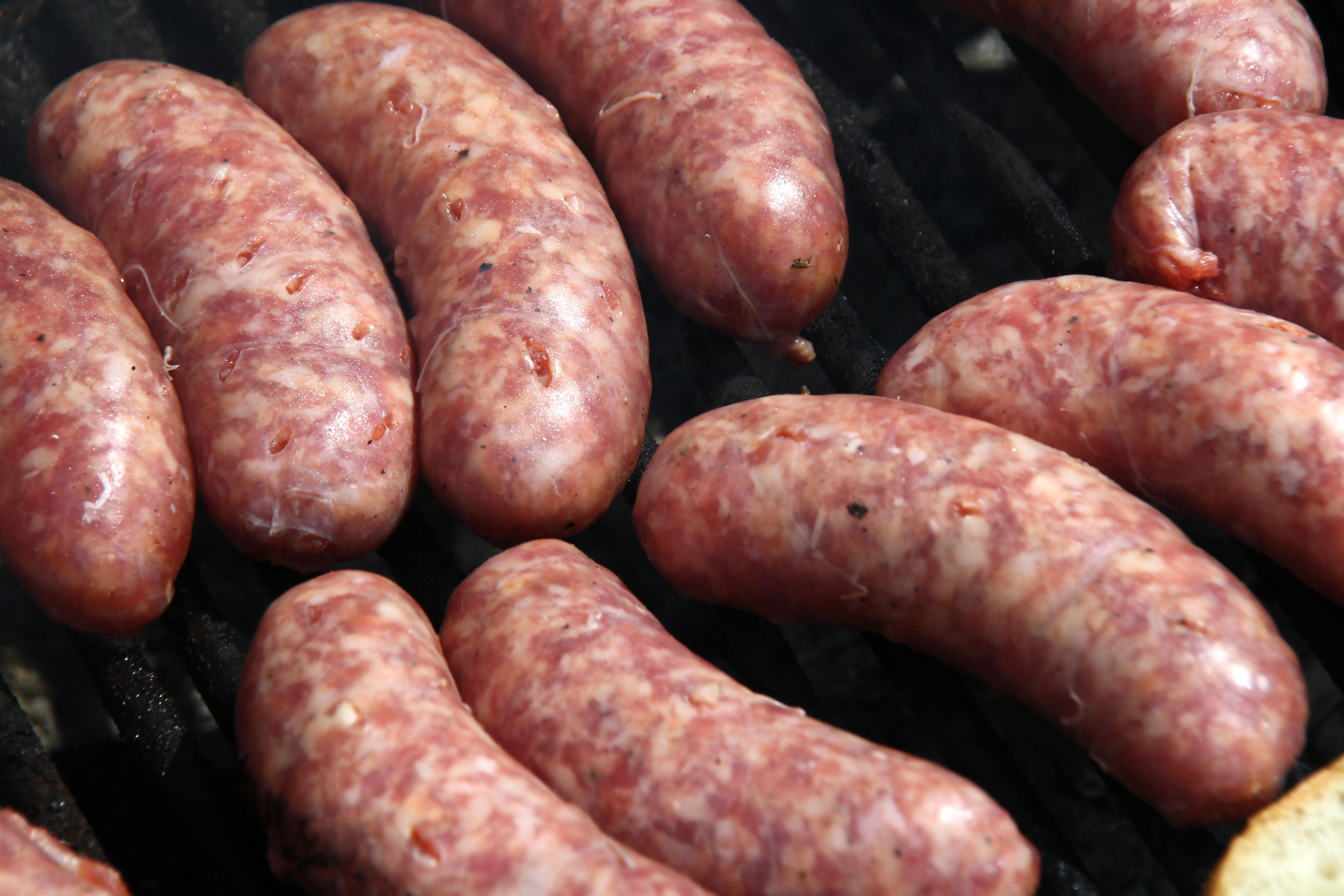
- Italian pork sausages
- Alternative names: Salsiccia (in Italian)
- Type: Sausage
- Place of origin: Italy
- Main ingredients: Pork, red pepper flakes, pepper paste, fennel
- Variations: Various Italian sausages

A wide variety of sausages (Italian: salsiccia, Italian: [salˈsittʃa]; pl.: salsicce) are made in Italy, having evolved through the centuries into many regional varieties. The sausages will typically be either a type of fresh sausage (Italian: salsiccia fresca), or a type of dried sausage (Italian: salsiccia secca). There are also some types of sausages that can be either used fresh or cured, such as Tuscan sausages (Italian: salsicce toscane).

== History ==
The Italian sausage was initially known as lucanica, a rustic pork sausage in ancient Roman cuisine, with the first evidence dating back to the 1st century BC, when the Roman historian Marcus Terentius Varro described stuffing spiced and salted meat into pig intestines, as follows: "They call lucanica a minced meat stuffed into a casing, because our soldiers learned how to prepare it." The writings of Cicero and Martial also mention lucanica (Lucian sausage) as a speciality introduced in Rome by the Lucanian slaves. A recipe for preparation is provided in the first century Apicius.

== Types of sausage in Italy ==
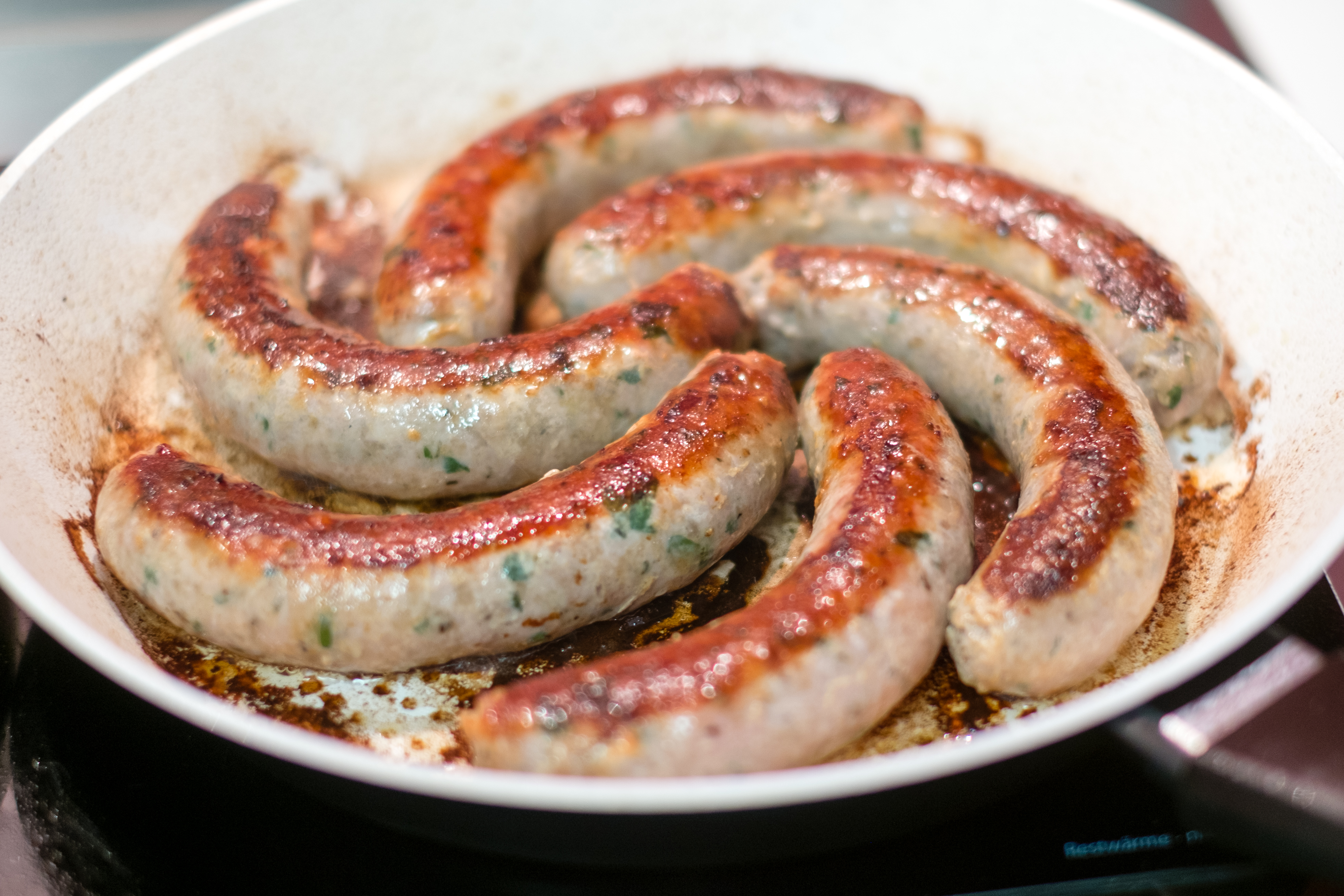
Italian sausages with parsley

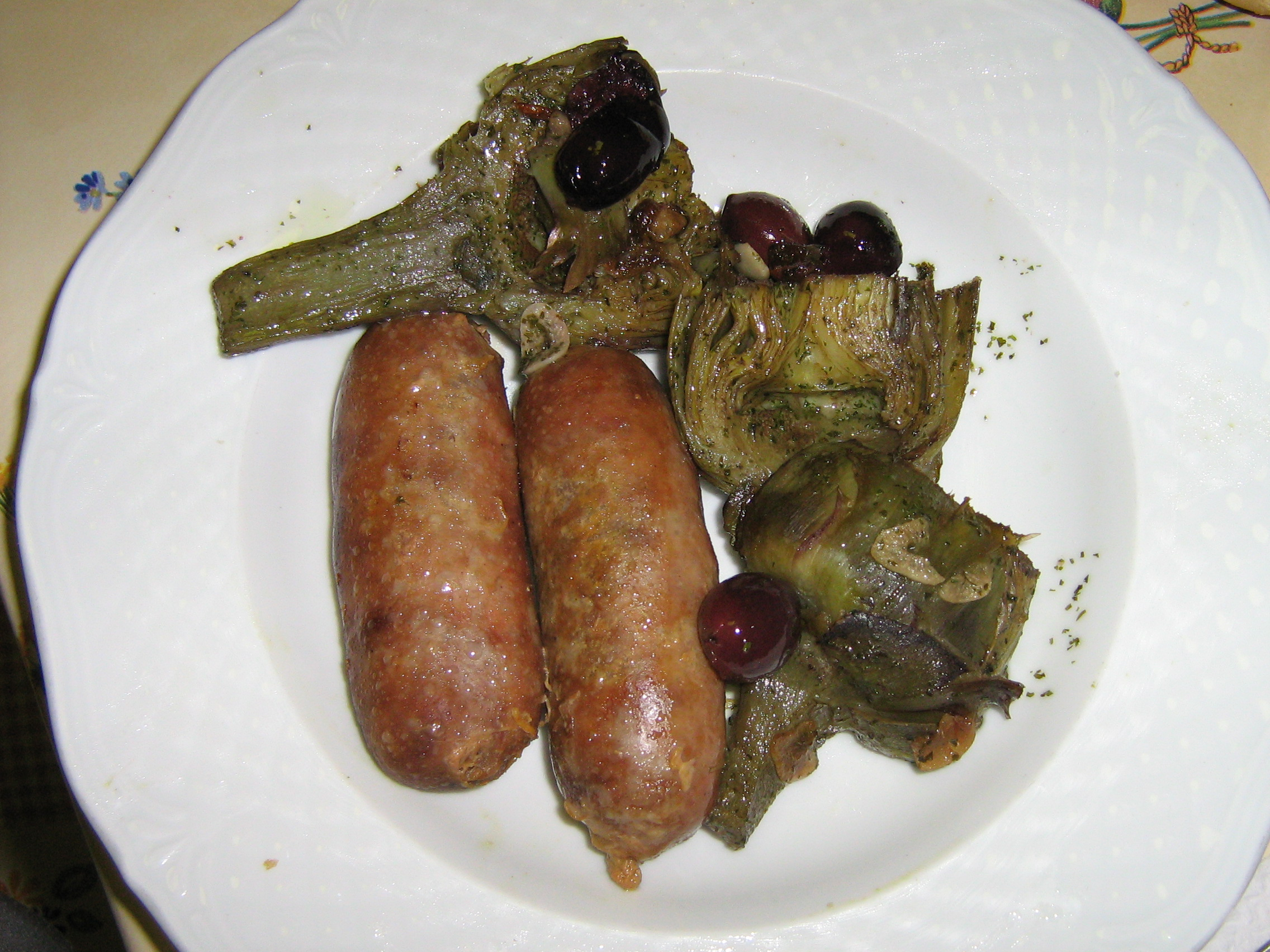
Italian sausages with artichokes

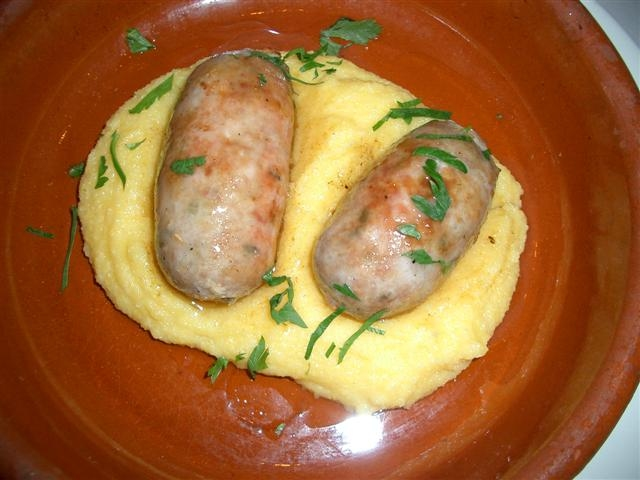
Italian sausages with polenta

=== Mazzafegato ===
Mazzafegato sausage ('liver mash', or 'liver sausage') is a sausage typically from Abruzzo, Lazio, Marche, Umbria, and Tuscany regions that includes mashed liver. The style from Abruzzo includes pork liver, heart, lungs, and pork cheek, and is seasoned with garlic, orange peel, salt, pepper, and bay leaves.

=== Salsiccia al coriandolo ===
The salsiccia al coriandolo ('coriander sausage'), from the comune (municipality) of Monte San Biagio, Lazio, also includes coriander, sweet chili peppers, and sweet red wine.

=== Salsiccia al finocchio ===
Salsiccia al finocchio ('fennel sausage') is a sausage popularised in the Sicily region. These sausages differ from the Tuscan style sausage due the addition of crumbed, dried fennel seeds.

=== Salsiccia fresca ===
Salsiccia fresca ('fresh sausage') is a type of sausage that is usually made somewhat spicy. It is made from fresh meat (often pork) and fat, and is flavoured with spices, salt, and pepper, and traditionally stuffed into natural gut casings. Salsiccia fresca al peperoncino ('fresh chilli sausage') is a spicy sausage flavoured with chopped garlic, salt, and chilli pepper (which gives the sausage a redder colour).

=== Salsiccia secca ===
Salsiccia secca ('dried sausage') is an air dried sausages typically made from either the meat of domestic pigs or from the meat from wild boars.

=== Salsiccia sotto la cenere ===
Another Sicilian sausage, salsiccia sotto la cenere ('sausage under the ash') is a style of sausage traditionally cooked in the ashes of the hearth.

=== Salsiccia toscana ===
Salsiccia toscana ('Tuscan sausage'), also known as sarciccia, is made from various cuts of pork, including the shoulder and ham, which is chopped and mixed with herbs such as sage and rosemary.

== See also ==
Media related to Salsiccia at Wikimedia Commons
