= Neapolitan cuisine =

Traditional food of Naples, Italy

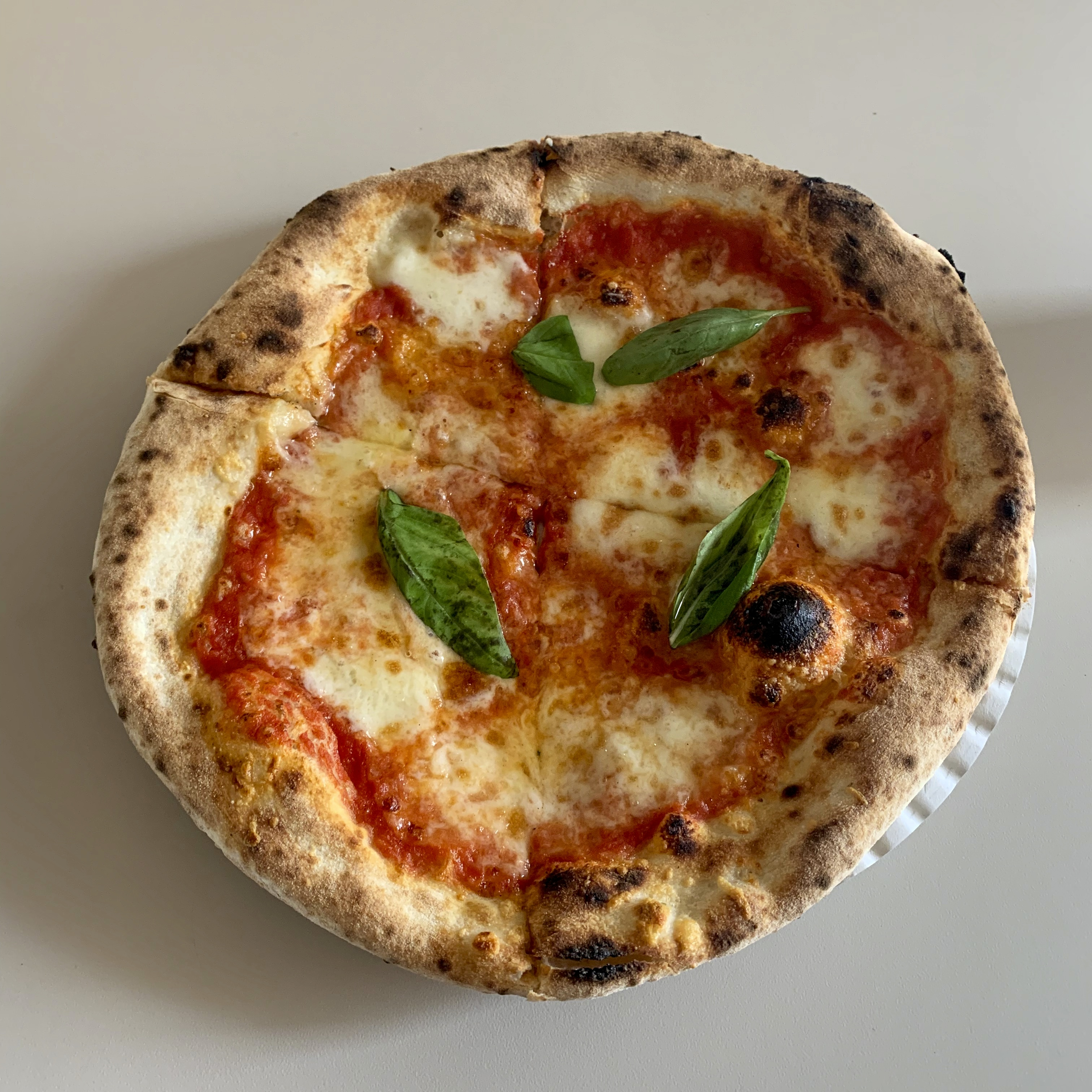
Pizza originates in Neapolitan cuisine.

Neapolitan cuisine has influences that date back to the Greco-Roman period. Over the following centuries, the cuisine developed as different cultures controlled Naples and its kingdoms, such as those of Aragon and France.

Because Naples was the capital of the Kingdom of Naples, its cuisine drew substantially from the cuisine of the entire Campania region, leading to the cuisine including both dishes based on rural ingredients (pasta, vegetables, cheese) and seafood (fish, crustaceans, mollusks). Many recipes are influenced by the local aristocratic cuisine, such as timballo and the sartù di riso, pasta or rice dishes with elaborate preparation, and dishes from popular traditions prepared with inexpensive but nutritious ingredients, such as pasta e fagioli (pasta and beans) and other pasta dishes with vegetables.

Dishes originating from Neapolitan cuisine, particularly pasta and pizza, are among the best known foods in Italian cuisine worldwide, disseminated via migration. Citing this influence, food writer Waverley Root wrote in the late 60s that "what the world knows as “Italian” cooking originated in [Naples]."

== Overview ==
Campania extensively produces tomatoes, peppers, spring onions, potatoes, artichokes, fennel, lemons, and oranges which all take on the flavour of volcanic soil. The Gulf of Naples offers fish and seafood. Campania is one of the largest producers and consumers of pasta in Italy, especially spaghetti. In the regional cuisine, pasta is prepared in various styles that can feature tomato sauce, cheese, clams, and shellfish.

Spaghetti alla puttanesca is a popular dish made with olives, tomatoes, anchovies, capers, chili peppers, and garlic. The region is well known for its mozzarella production (especially from the milk of water buffalo) that is used in a variety of dishes, including parmigiana di melanzane (shallow fried aubergine slices layered with cheese and tomato sauce, then baked). Desserts include struffoli (deep fried balls of dough), ricotta-based pastiera, sfogliatelle, torta caprese, and rum baba.

Originating in Neapolitan cuisine, pizza has become popular worldwide. Pizza is an oven-baked, flat, disc-shaped bread typically topped with a tomato sauce, cheese (usually mozzarella), and various toppings depending on the culture. Since the original pizza, several other types of pizzas have evolved.

Since Naples was the capital of the Kingdom of Two Sicilies, its cuisine drew significantly from the cuisine of the entire Campania region, leading to the cuisine including both dishes based on rural ingredients (pasta, vegetables, cheese) and seafood dishes (fish, crustaceans, mollusks). Many recipes are influenced by the local aristocratic cuisine, such as timballo and sartù di riso, pasta or rice dishes with elaborate preparation, and dishes from popular traditions prepared with inexpensive but nutritious ingredients, such as pasta with beans and other pasta dishes with vegetables.

Regional wines include Aglianico (Taurasi), Fiano, Falanghina, Lacryma Christi, Coda di Volpe dei Campi Flegrei, and Greco di Tufo.

== History ==
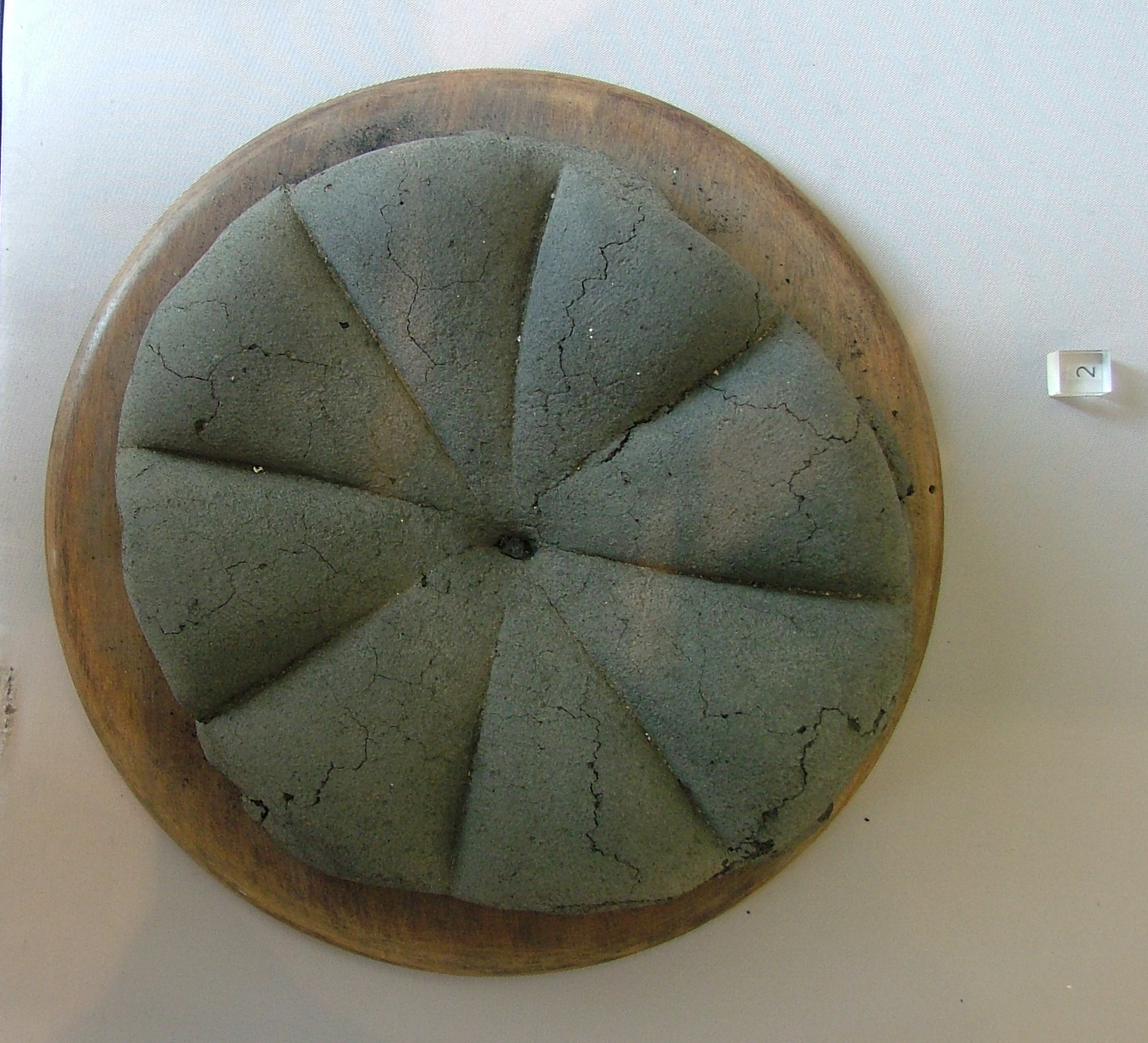
Carbonized bread found in Pompeii

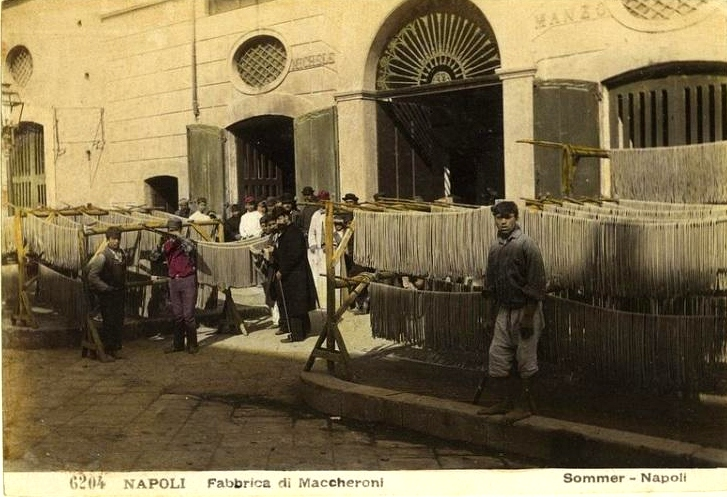
Macaroni-maker firm in Naples at the beginning of the 20th century

Naples has a history that goes back many centuries, and the city itself predates many others in the region including Rome. It has endured the Greeks, Romans, the Goths, the Byzantines, and dozens of successions of kings from France and Spain. Each culture left a mark on the way food is prepared in Naples and Campania itself.

Finding the connections between modern and Greco-Roman culinary traditions is not always easy. Among the traces of classical culinary tastes, plates from the period of Greek rule found in Magna Graecia (southern Italy) depict fishes and mollusks, an indication that seafood was appreciated during that period. Frescoes from Pompeii depict fruit baskets filled with figs and pomegranates. An excavation at Oplontis in the Villa Poppaea shows a fresco of a cake, the ingredients of which are not yet known.

The Roman garum is the ancient sauce most similar to that used for the modern colatura di alici, typical of Cetara. It can be traced back to the sweet-sour taste typical of the Roman cooking described by Apicius, along with the use of raisins in salty dishes, such as pizza di scarola (endive pie), or braciole al ragù (meat rolls in ragù sauce). The use of wheat in the modern pastiera cake, typical of Easter, could have had originally a symbolic meaning, related to cults of Artemis, Cybele and Ceres and pagan rituals of fertility, celebrated around the Spring equinox. The name struffoli, a Christmas cake, comes from the Greek word στρόγγυλος (stróngylos, meaning 'round-shaped').

During the 16th century, Naples was known for their breads. Pasta was a luxury and not especially common; in times of famine, production was restricted so more bread could be made. The basic diet centered around a combination of meat and cabbage. According to food writer Arthur Schwartz, the most common flavour combination was sweet and sour.

By the beginning of the following century, this began to shift. Under Spanish rule, production issues and inefficiencies in the public market system caused the supply of meat and vegetables, particularly cabbage, to falter. In their place, Neapolitans ate breads and pasta. The uptake of pasta was assisted by developments in technology, allowing cheaper production and a new status as a staple food. Cheese and pasta took over as the basic food pairing, and the Neapolitans became known as "macaroni eaters". In the 19th century, this combination was developed with the addition of tomato sauce.

As Italy underwent unification in the mid 19th century, Naples, and by extension Southern Italy, was strongly identified with pasta. To calm a tense political environment, the Piedmontese of Northern Italy adopted pasta as a symbol of unity, and as they did, pasta became a symbol of Italy as a whole. At the turn of the century, Naples had a reputation among travellers for squalid conditions; journalist Waverley Root described scenes he observed driving through Naples in the 1920s of "home-made macaroni hung out to dry like the family washing—at the mercy of dust, dirt, insects and the depredations of passing pigeons, children and dogs." Over the following decades, Naples industrialized, and most pasta became made in factories.

== Typical ingredients ==
=== Pasta ===
There is a great variety of Neapolitan pastas. Pasta was not invented in Naples, but one of the best grades available is found quite close by, in Gragnano, and in Torre Annunziata, a few kilometers from the capital. It was here also that the industrial production of pasta started, with the techniques to dry and preserve it. The main ingredient is durum wheat, which is harder than soft wheat, so there was more industrial production than in northern Italy, where home-made pasta is more popular. Traditionally in Naples pasta must be cooked al dente.

The most popular variety of pasta, besides the classic spaghetti and linguine, are the paccheri and the ziti, long pipe-shaped pasta, broken by hand before cooking and usually topped with Neapolitan ragù. Pasta with vegetables is usually also prepared with pasta mista (pasta ammescata in Neapolitan language), which is now produced industrially as a distinct variety of pasta, but which was once sold cheaply, made up of broken pieces of different types of pasta.

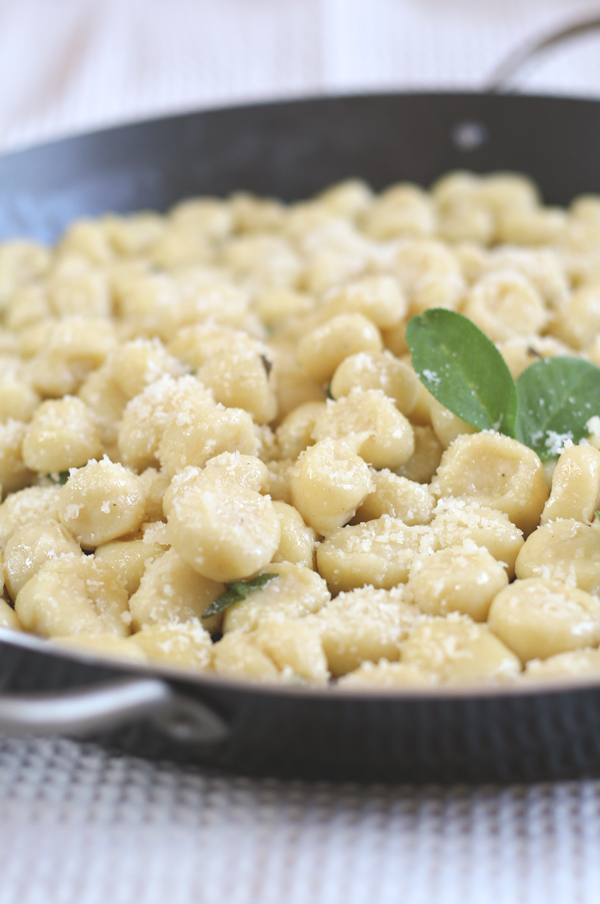
Gnocchi of ricotta cheese dressed in butter and sage

Hand-made gnocchi, prepared with flour and potatoes, have been popular despite widespread dislike of potatoes in Naples. In 1949 W. H. Auden wrote Igor Stravinsky from Forio in Ischia, "Forio thinks us crazy because we eat potatoes, which are to them a mark of abject poverty." In reporting this, Francis Steegmuller, a longtime resident of Naples, remarks on the French-inspired gattò, in which "the potato complement is nearly overwhelmed by cheese, ham and other ingredients".

Some of the more modern varieties of pasta, such as scialatielli, are also becoming popular.

=== Tomatoes ===
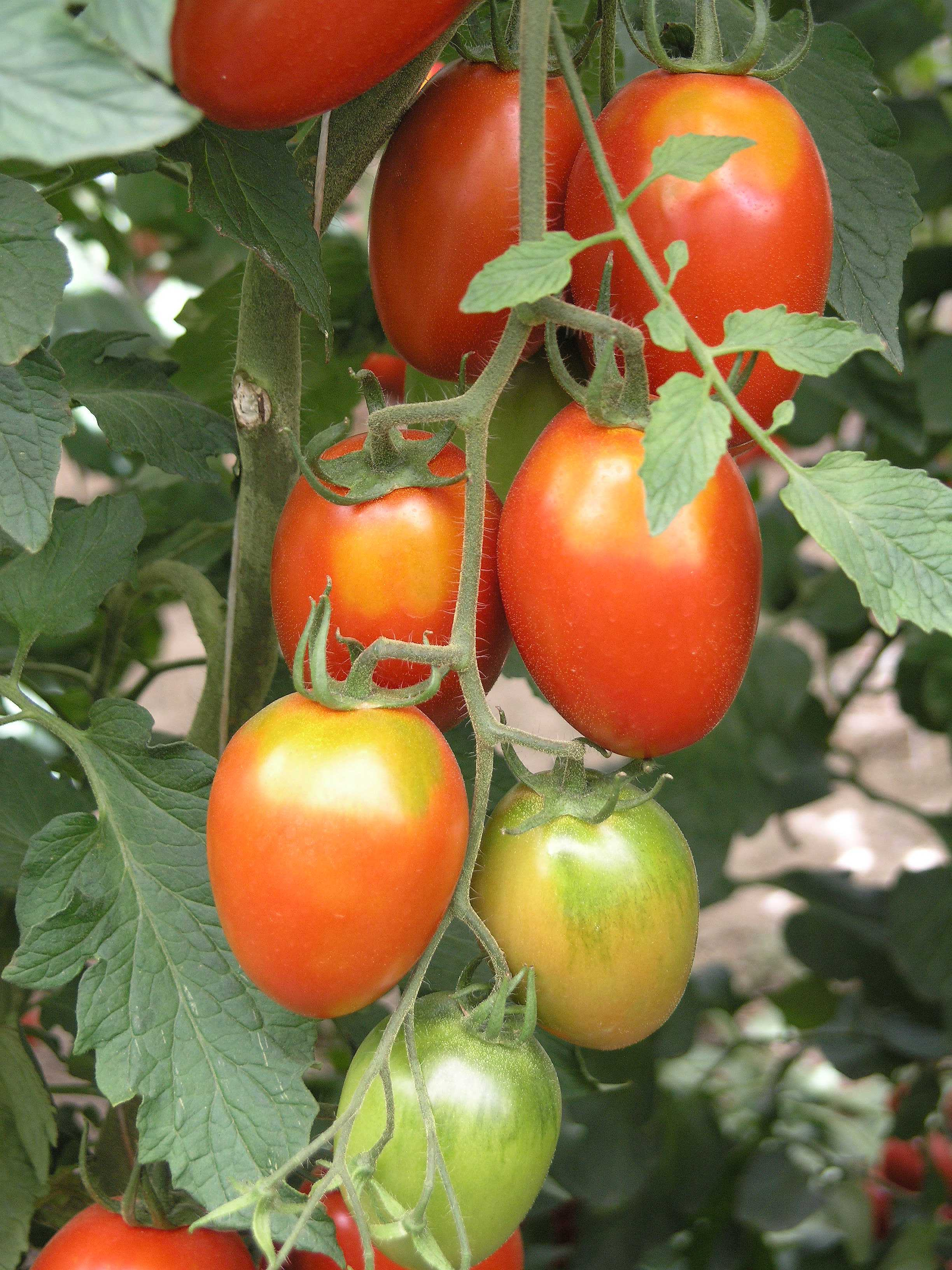
Tomato variety used for the piennolo

Tomatoes entered Neapolitan cuisine during the 18th century.

Industrial preservation of tomatoes began in 19th-century Naples. Products, including pelati (peeled tomatoes) and concentrato (tomato paste) have become exported worldwide. There are traditionally several ways of preparing home-made tomato preserves, either bottled tomato juice, or chopped into pieces. The conserva (sun dried concentrated juice) tomato is cooked for a long time and becomes a dark red cream with a velvety texture.

=== Vegetables ===
Campanian dishes using vegetables include parmigiana di melanzane and peperoni ripieni (stuffed peppers). Some of the most typical products are Cichorium endivia, smooth or curly (two varieties of endive), and different types of beans, chickpeas and other legumes. Several types of broccoli are eaten with regularity, the local fondness for the vegetable described by food writer Arthur Schwartz as "beyond [the American] imagining." The most popular of these is broccoli rabe, which is closely associated with sausage and braciole, and is also often eaten with pasta and Italian wedding soup. Cabbage is eaten in winter when other crops are out of season, a simple preparation being stewing. Contrary to what is popularly believed internationally, only small quantities of garlic are used in Neapolitan cooking.

Zucchini are widely used; the largest ones fried with vinegar and fresh mint (a scapece). The male flowers of zucchini can be fried in a salty dough (sciurilli). (Note: Zucchini have separate male and female flowers. The female flowers are found on newly grown zucchini, but only the male ones are optimal to be fried as sciurilli) Regular red and yellow peppers are widely used, and a local variety of small green peppers (not spicy), peperoncini verdi, are usually fried. Black olives used in Neapolitan cooking are always the ones from Gaeta.

Salad is a side dish of many dishes, especially seafood ones. Lettuce, and more often the incappucciata (a local variety of the iceberg lettuce), more crispy, is mixed with carrots, fennel, rucola (some time ago it spontaneously grew in landfields, and was sold in the streets together with the less noble pucchiacchella), radishes, traditionally the long and spicy ones, which today are more and more rare, almost completely replaced by the round and sweeter ones.

During the Second World War, poor families sometimes resorted to eating whatever was available. Recipes have been reported of pasta cooked with empty pods of fava beans or peas.

=== Cheese ===
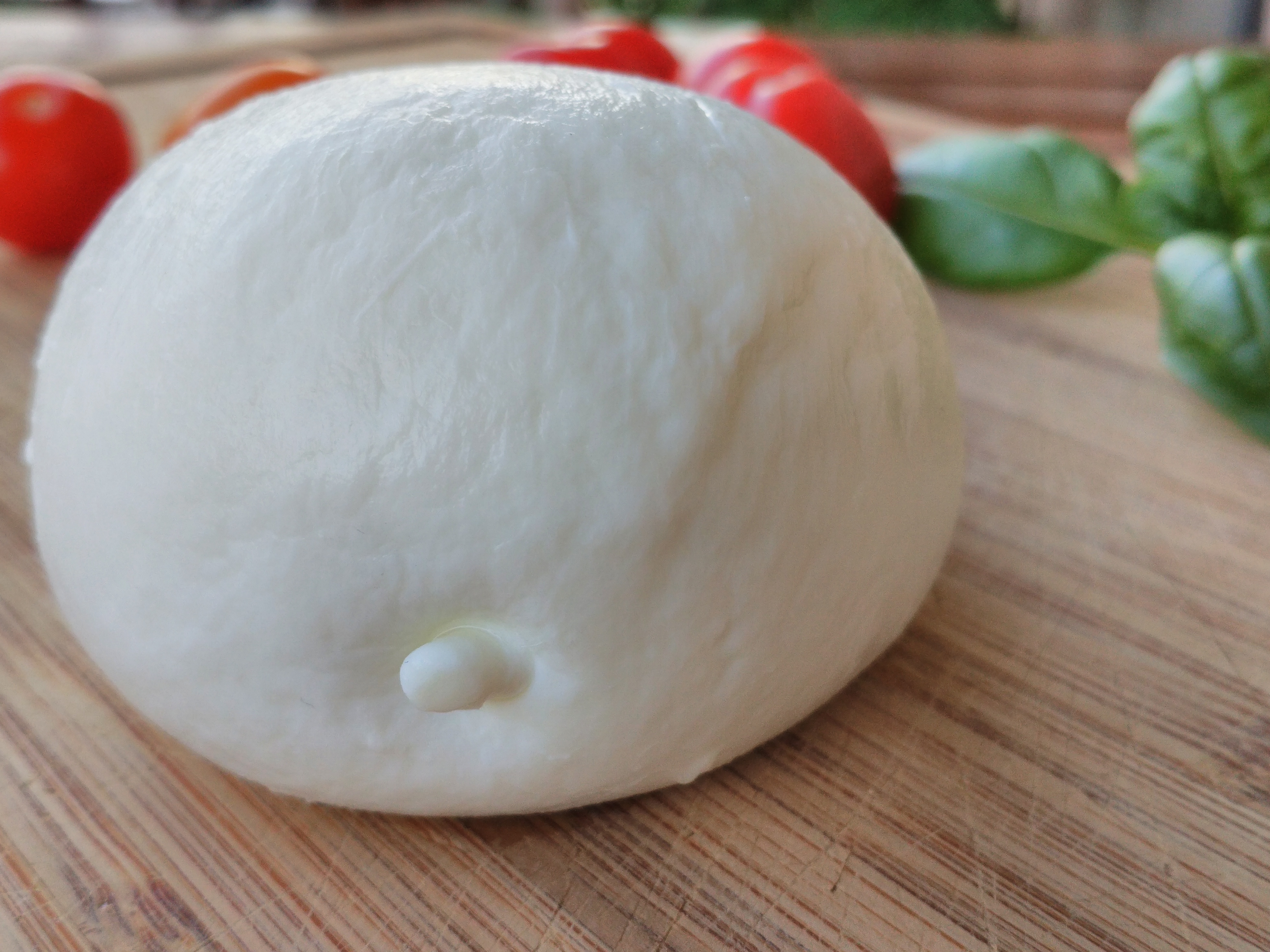
Mozzarella di bufala

Cheeses, both soft and aged, are important part of the Italian diet and also used in Neapolitan cooking: some recipes are descended from very old Roman traditions.

Starting from the freshest ones, the most used are:

- the ricotta di fuscella, very fresh and light, was originally sold in hand-made baskets. Commonly found now as a filling for certain pastas
- the ricotta fresca, eaten both fresh, and as side ingredient (for instance, on top of pasta with Neapolitan ragù)
- the ricotta secca, salty, slightly aged, typical of the Easter period
- the caciottella fresca, of Sorrento's peninsula, with very delicate taste
- the mozzarella di bufala, fresh cheese made with buffalo's milk, produced mostly on the region of Aversa and in the plain of Sele river
- the fior di latte, similar to mozzarella, but made with cow's milk; it is best produced in the region of Agerola.
- the provola affumicata, a fior di latte with scent of oak wood smoke, light brown on the exterior, more yellowish inside
- the bocconcini del cardinale, or burrielli, small mozzarellas, preserved in clay pots, flooded into cream or milk
- the scamorze, white or smoked
- the burrini di Sorrento, small provolone cheese with a butter hart
- the provoloni, the caciocavalli of different aging

=== Seafood ===
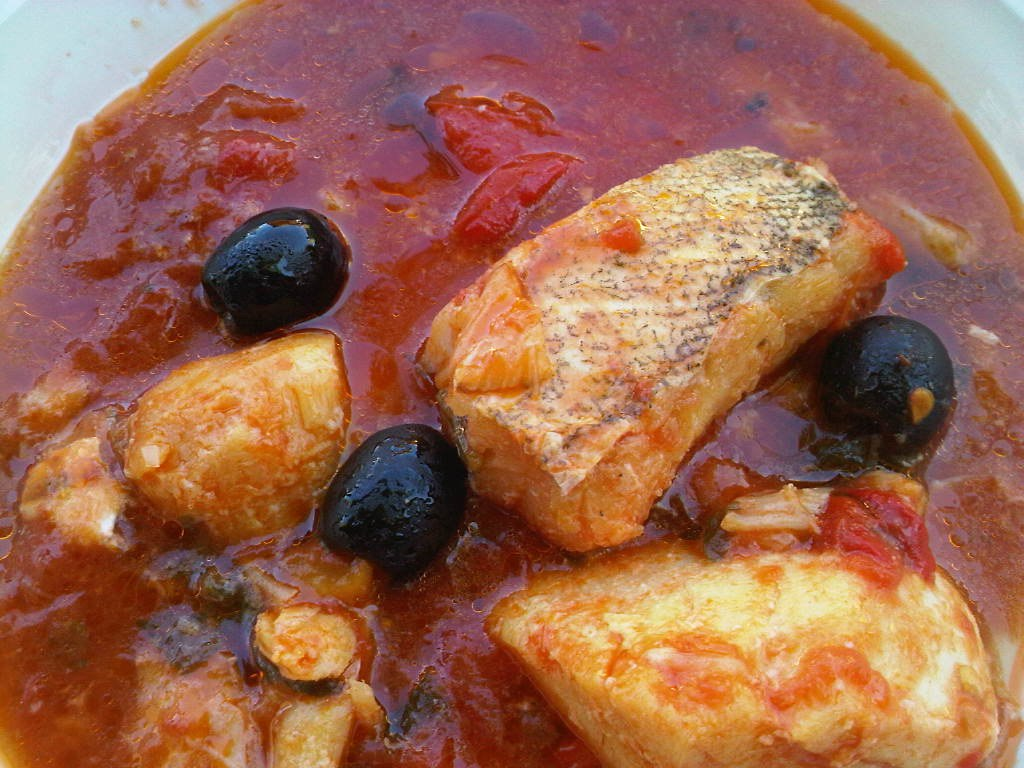
Baccalà with tomatoes

Neapolitan cooking has always used an abundance of all types of seafood from the Tyrrhenian Sea. Samuel Johnson's friend Hester Thrale was enthusiastic for "the most excellent, the most incomparable fish I ever ate; red mullets large as our mackerel, and of singularly high flavour; beside calamaro or ink-fish, a dainty worth of imperial luxury". Recipes use either less expensive fishes, in particular anchovies, and other fishes, such as those used to prepare the zuppa: scorfano (Scorpaena scrofa), tracina (Trachinus draco), cuoccio (Triglia lanterna), or fishes of medium and large size, such as spigola (European seabass) and orate (gilt-head bream), presently sold mainly from fish farms, or such as dentice (Dentex dentex), sarago (Diplodus sargus) and pezzogna (Pagellus bogaraveo). Fishes of very small size are also used:

- The cicenielli, baby fishes, very small and transparent, prepared either steamed or fried in a dough
- The fravaglio, few centimeter long, mainly of triglia (Mullus surmuletus) or retunni (Spicara smaris), typically fried

The baccalà (cod) and stockfish, imported from northern Europe seas, are either fried or cooked with potatoes and tomatoes.

Most cephalopods are employed (octopus, squid, cuttlefish), as well as crustacea (mainly shrimp).

Shellfish cozze (mussels), vongole (clams), cannolicchi (Ensis siliqua, taratufi, telline (Donax trunculus), sconcigli (Haustellum brandaris) are employed in many seafood meals, and sometimes are eaten raw, but this happens more and more seldom nowadays. Clams require a special note. The vongola verace is Venerupis decussata, not to be confused with the Philippines clam (Venerupis philippinarum), very frequently found on the markets, and often called verace in northern Italy's markets), and the lupino (Dosinia exoleta).

It is now illegal to sell and eat date mussels, as their fishing seriously damages coastline rocks, mainly in the Sorrento peninsula.

=== Meat ===
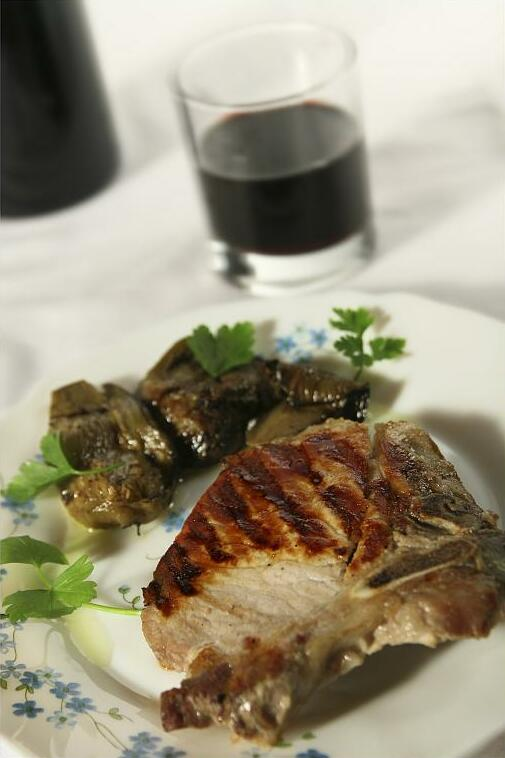
Grilled pork braciola

Meat is less common in Neapolitan cooking than in the cuisine of Northern Italy. The most common types of meat used are:

- Sausage: salsicce and cervellatine, with not finely hand-cut meat (a ponta 'e curtiello)
- Pork liver, rounded in a net of pork's fat and a bay leaf
- Trippa (tripe) and other more humble cuts of pork or beef, such as the typical 'o pere e 'o musso (pig's feet and cow snouts) and the zuppa di soffritto, a spicy soup with tomato and hot chili pepper
- Braciole, pork rolls stuffed with raisins, pine nuts and parsley, fixed with toothpicks and cooked in ragù
- Lamb and goat are roasted, usually with potatoes and peas, typically around Easter.
- Rabbit and chicken, often cooked alla cacciatora, pan fried with tomatoes
- Beef or other red meat with tomatoes, cooked for a long time to tenderise an inexpensive piece of meat as in carne pizzaiola

The meatballs of Naples are known internationally and throughout Italy, where they are held in poor regard for their high ratio of bread to meat. Shaped into balls the size of marbles, meatballs are used to fill baked dishes including timballo and sartù di riso. Larger meatballs are pan fried and eaten with a vegetable and without sauce for the second course in a meal, or simmered in a tomato sauce either raw or after browning. Historic preparations contained pine nuts and raisins, inclusions which were by the 1990s comparatively rare.

== Bread ==
The most popular bread is pane cafone prepared with natural yeast, cooked in a wood-fired oven with hard crust and large holes inside. Also used are sfilatini, somewhat similar to a French baguette, but shorter and thicker. Rosetta rolls and other varieties are also present.

== Pasta dishes ==
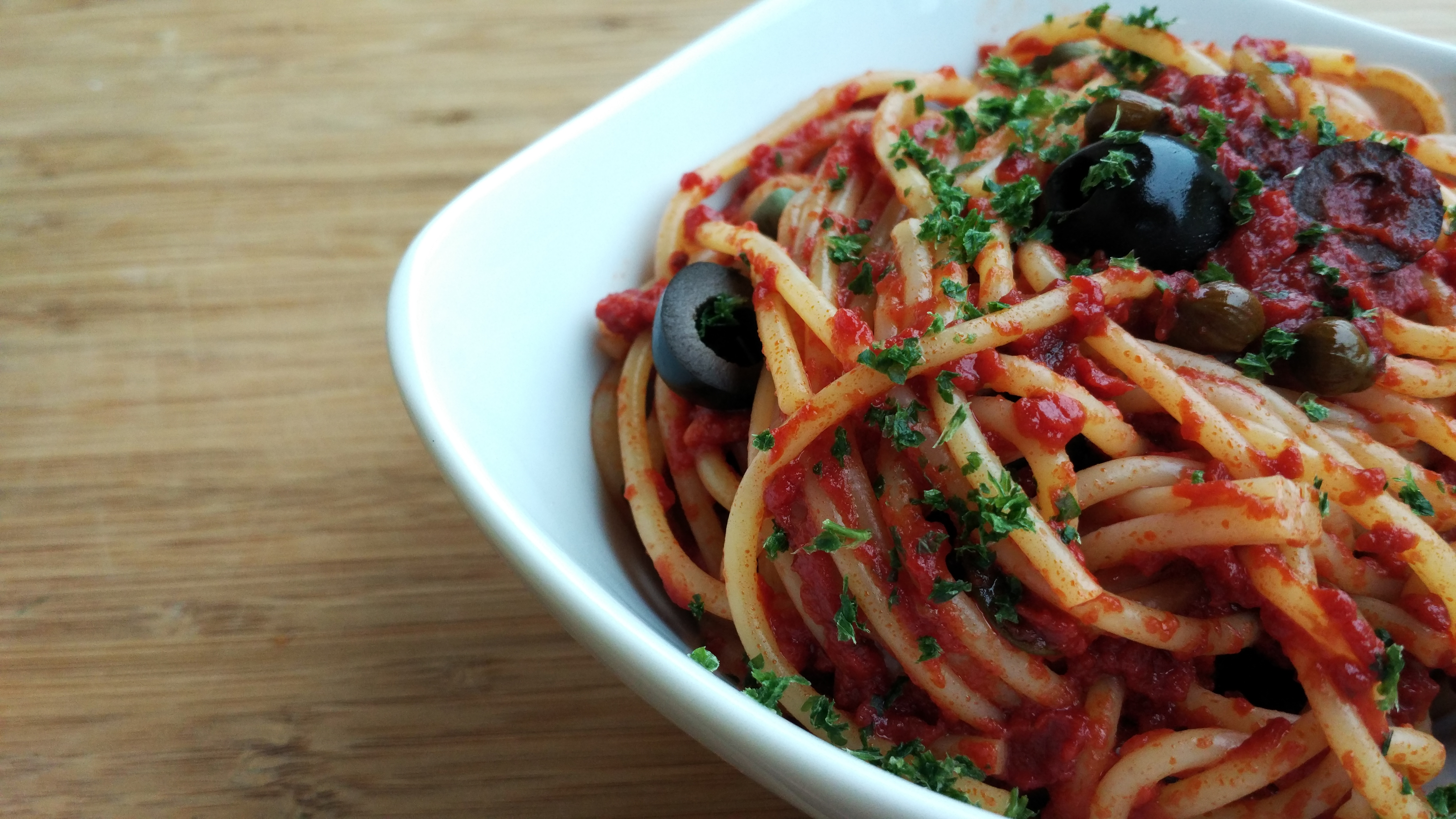
Spaghetti alla puttanesca

=== Dishes of the poor ===
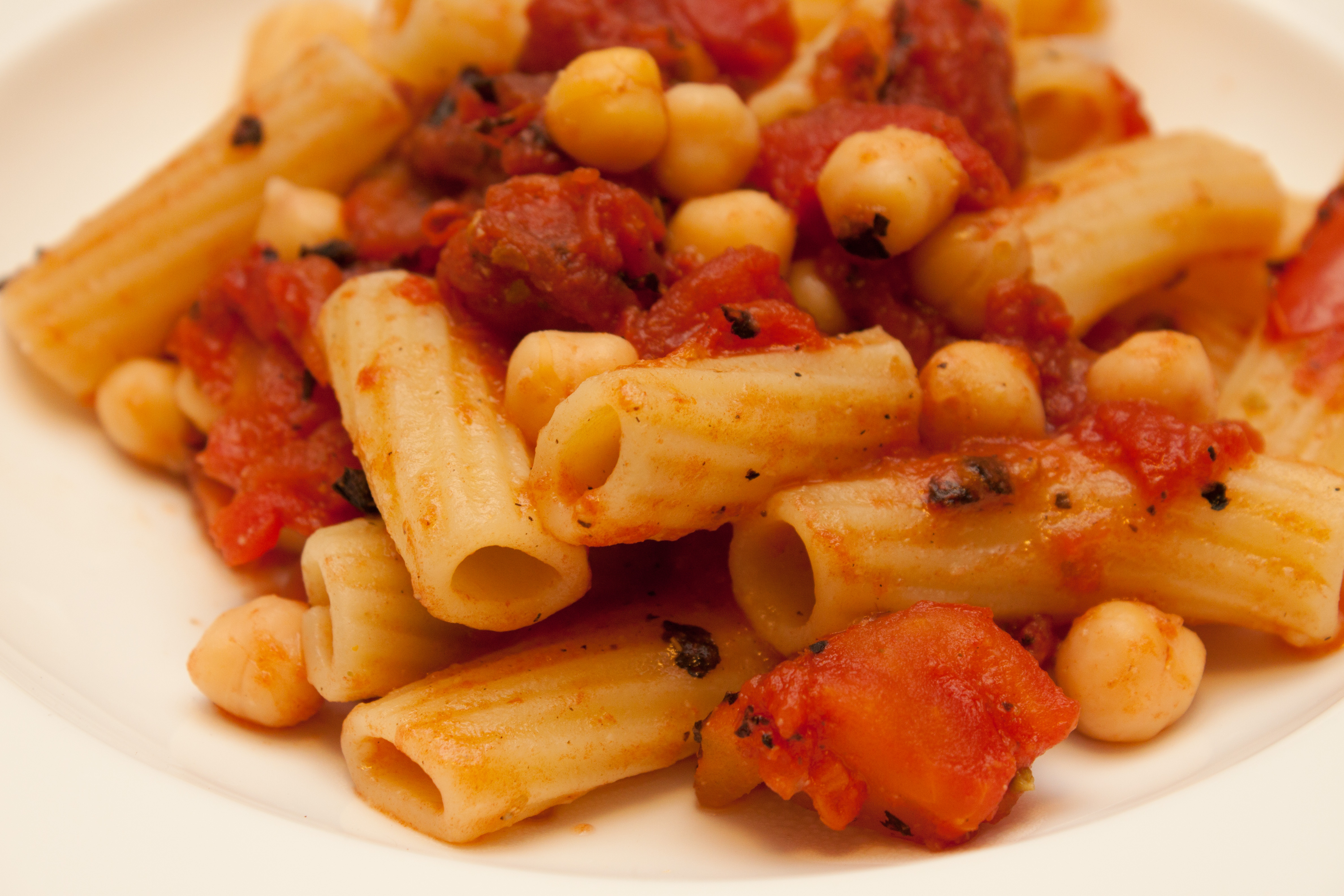
Pasta e ceci (pasta and chickpeas)

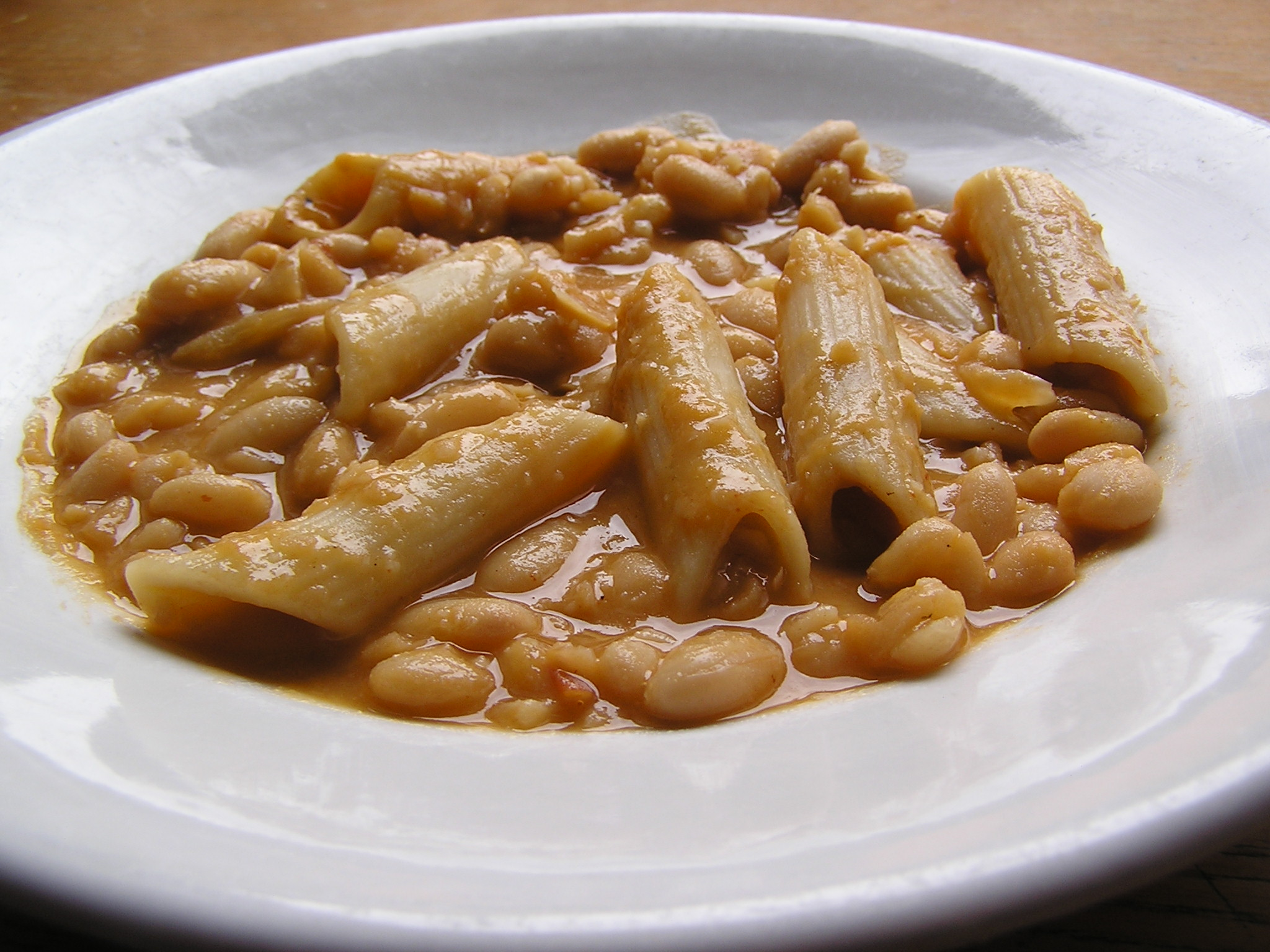
Pasta e fagioli (pasta with beans)

Cuisine traditionally attributed to the poor often mixes pasta with legumes. The most popular are: pasta e fagioli (pasta with beans), sometimes enriched with pork rind (cotiche), pasta e ceci (pasta and chickpeas), pasta e lenticchie (pasta and lentils), pasta e piselli (pasta and peas). Similarly to legumes, other vegetables are associated with pasta, such as pasta e patate (pasta and potatoes), pasta e cavolfiore (pasta and cauliflower), pasta e zucca (pasta and pumpkin). The most traditional cooking method consists of cooking the condiments first, for instance, pan frying garlic with oil, then add steamed beans, or by frying onion and celery, then adding potatoes cut into little dices. After frying, water is added, brought to a boil, salted. To this, pasta is added and stirred frequently. Unlike in a process where pasta is cooked then drained, the starch here is retained. Cooking pasta with vegetables makes the sauce creamier (azzeccato), and is distinct from the tradition of "noble" cuisine. Another hearty dish in the cuisine of the poor is pasta cooked with cheese and eggs stracciatella (pasta caso e ova).

Spaghetti, dressed with tomato sauce, black olives from Gaeta and capers makes spaghetti alla puttanesca. Spaghetti alle vongole fujute is spaghetti, dressed with cherry tomatoes sauce, garlic, oil and parsley. This is a seafood pasta recipe made without clams.

Frittata is sometimes prepared with pasta leftovers, either with tomato sauce or white. Pasta, cooked al dente is mixed with raw scrambled egg and cheese, then pan fried. It can be enriched with many different ingredients. Must be cooked on both sides, flipped with the help of a plate. If well cooked, it is compact, and can be cut into slices. It can be eaten during outdoor lunches.

=== Dishes of the rich ===
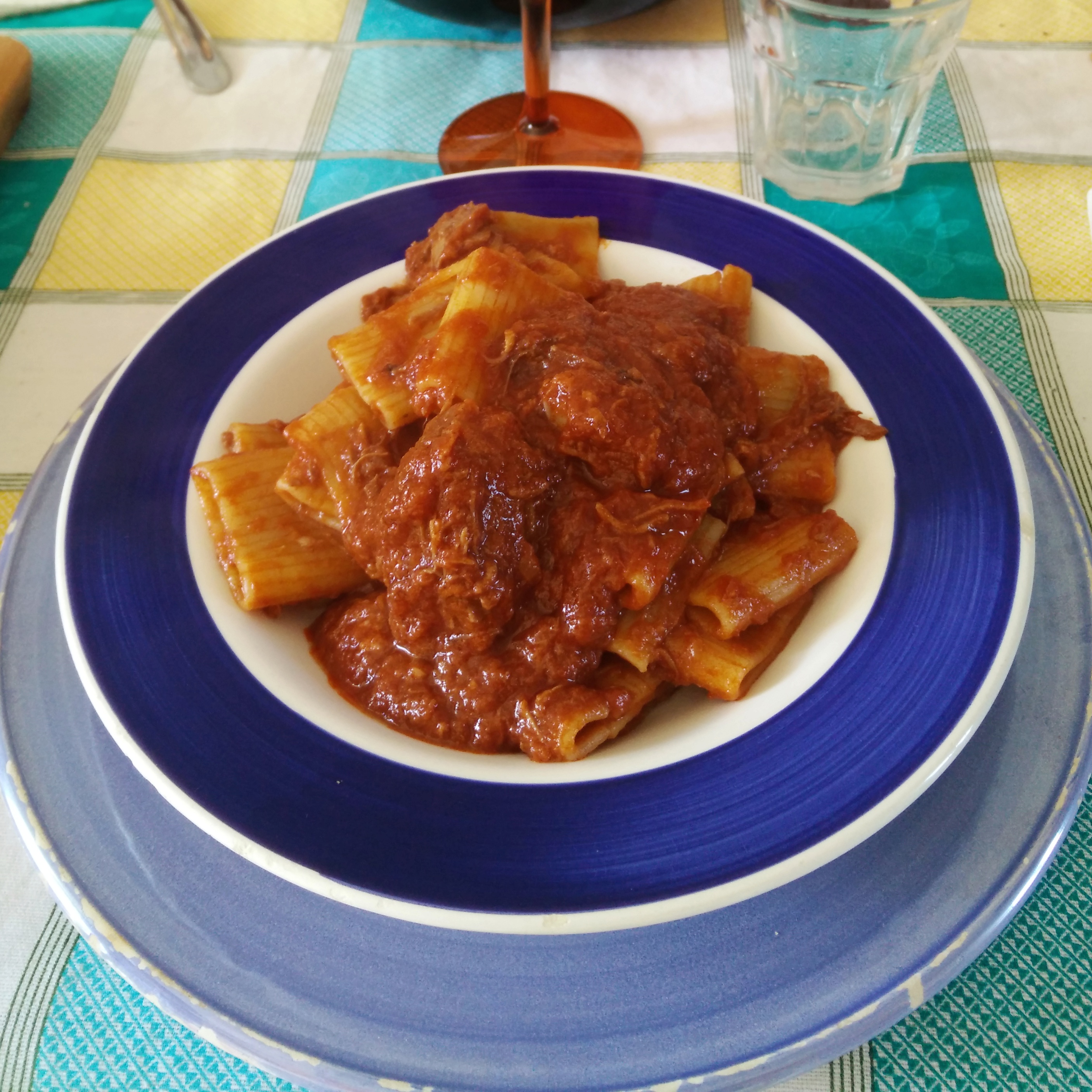
Neapolitan ragù served with paccheri pasta

The aristocratic cuisine used pasta for elaborate recipes, such as timballi, rarely used in everyday food.

Richer sauces, more elaborate than the vegetable pasta dishes mentioned above, that are frequently used to dress pasta include:

- The Bolognese sauce, vaguely inspired by the ragù emiliano, prepared with minced carrot, celery, onion, ground beef and tomato
- The Genovese sauce, not inspired by Genoa in spite of the name, but prepared with meat browned with abundant onions and other aromatics

With the Neapolitan ragù the most traditionally used pasta are the ziti, long macaroni, that are broken into shorter pieces by hand before cooking. The Neapolitan ragù is also used, together with fior di latte, to dress the gnocchi alla sorrentina, then cooked in oven in a small single-portion clay pot (pignatiello).

=== Seafood ===
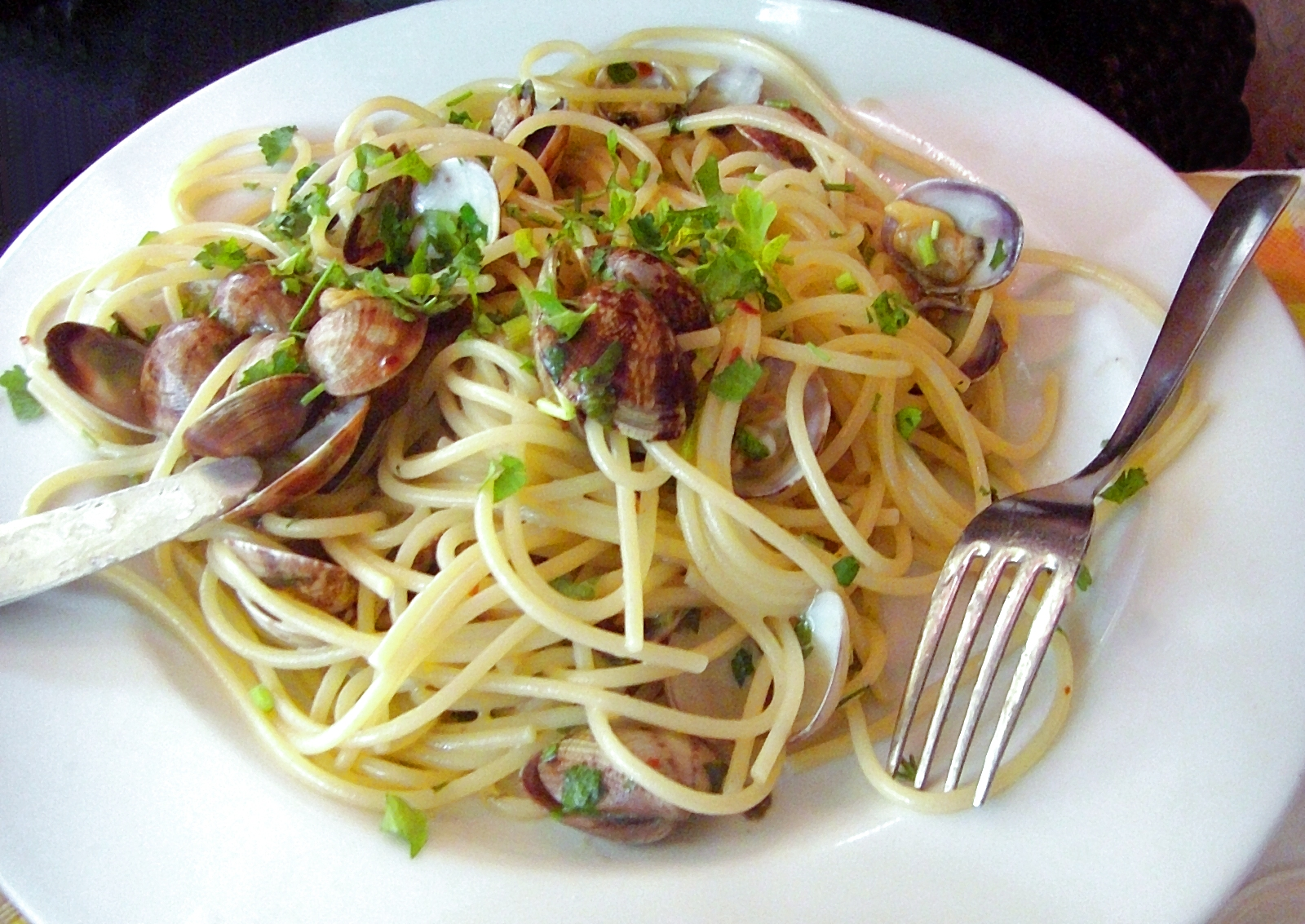
Spaghetti alle vongole

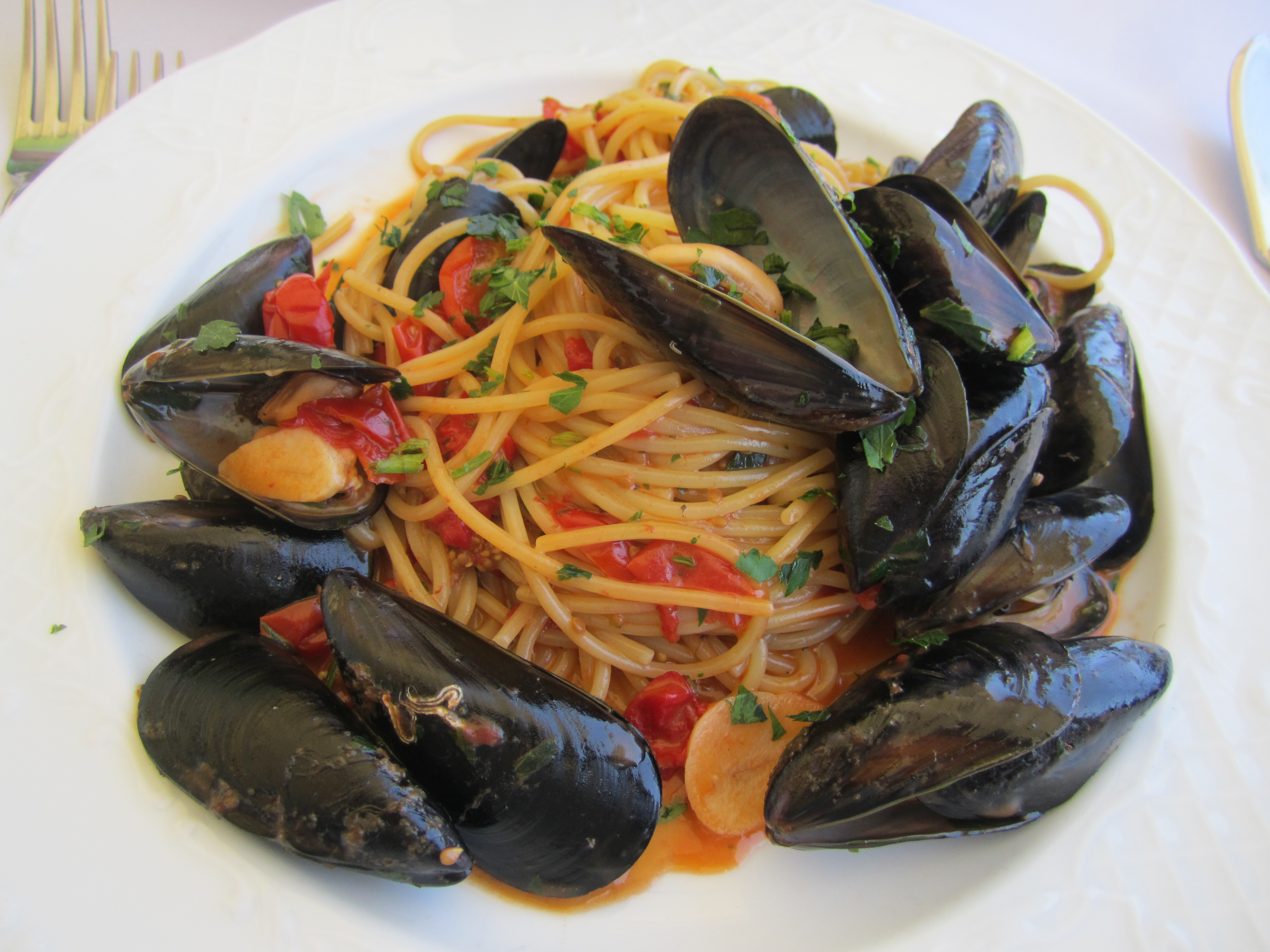
Spaghetti con le cozze

Spaghetti, linguine and paccheri are believed to pair very well with fish and seafood, and from this union come the dishes typical of important lunches or dinners (weddings, in particular). The most typical ones are:

- Spaghetti alle vongole or other shellfishes (clams, mussels, and other)
- Paccheri con la zuppa di pesce (scorfani, cuocci, tracine and more)
- Pasta con i calamari, with squid sauce, cooked with white wine

There are many more varieties, for instance spaghetti with a white sauce of Mediterranean cod.

Sometimes the traditional dishes of pasta with legumes can be mixed with seafood, so there are, for instance, pasta e fagioli con le cozze (pasta and beans with mussels), or other more modern variations, such as pasta with zucchini and clams, that lose any traditional connotation.

== Rice dishes ==
The most famous rice dish is the sartù di riso, a sort of timballo made with rice, stuffed with chicken livers, sausage, little meatballs, fior di latte or provola, peas, mushrooms, and with Neapolitan ragù, or, in the white version (in bianco) with béchamel sauce.

In the cuisine of the poor, rice is also cooked as riso e verza (rice and cabbage), flavoured with little pieces of Parmesan cheese crusts that slightly melt while cooking.

A seafood rice dish is the risotto alla pescatora (fisherman's risotto), prepared with various mollusks (different types of clams, squid and cuttlefish), shrimps and a broth made from the boiling of seafood shells.

Arancini (palle 'e riso), more typical of Sicilian cuisine, are also frequently eaten in Naples.

== Pizza ==
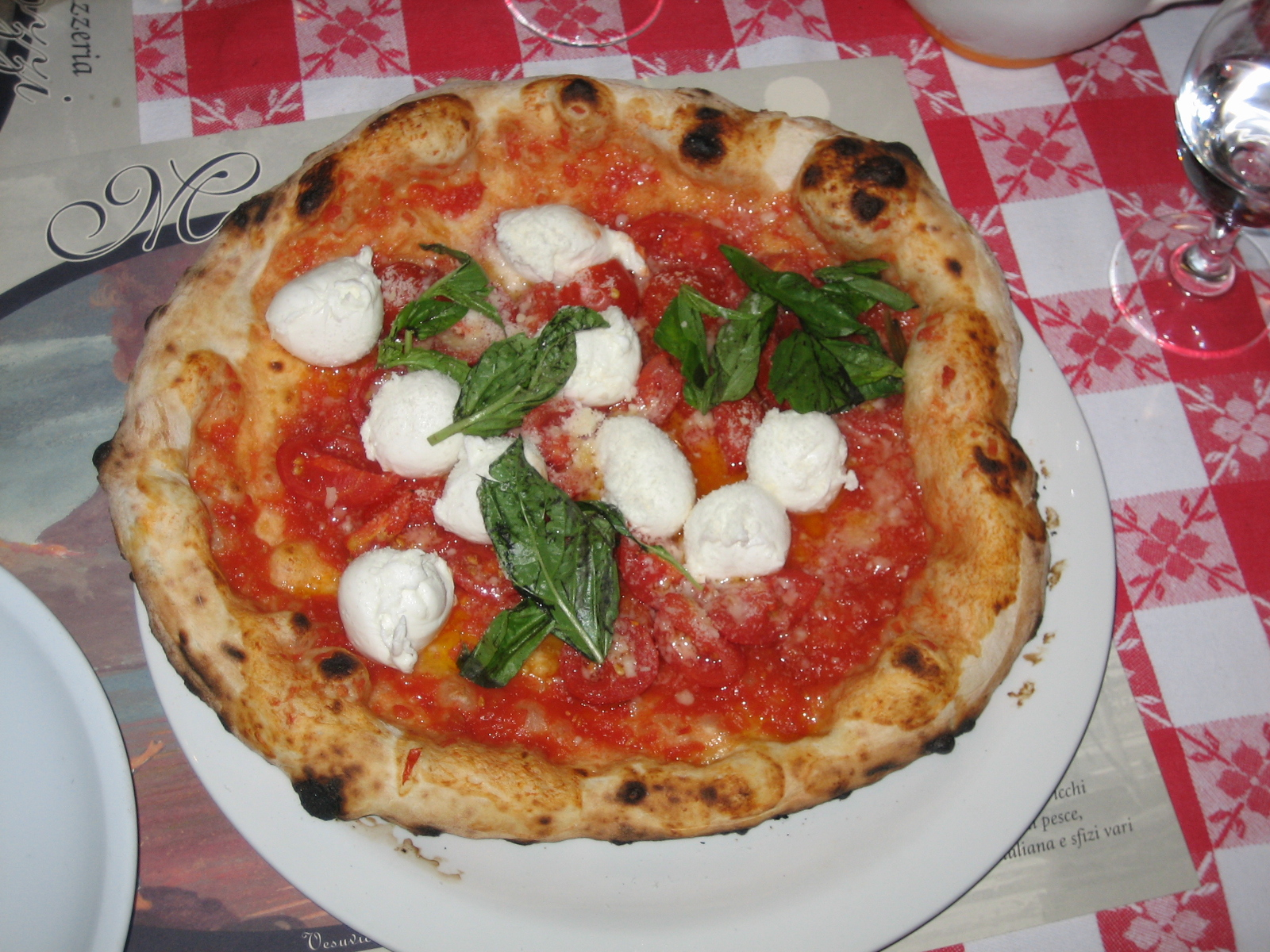
The ingredients of traditional pizza Margherita—tomatoes (red), mozzarella (white), and basil (green)—are held by popular legend to be inspired by the colours of the national flag of Italy.

Pizza is the most popular and best known creation of all Neapolitan cuisine. It soon became very popular across all social classes, up to being present in the Bourbon court. King Ferdinand I experienced cooking pizza in Capodimonte's porcelain ovens. After Italian unification, the new kings were also attracted by this southern food. The pizzaiolo Raffaele Esposito is often credited with popularising a particular variety of Neapolitan pizza. A popular legend of one pizza, pizza Margherita, is that in 1889 Esposito prepared in honor of queen Margherita of Savoy a nationalistic pizza, where the colours of the Italian flag were represented by the mozzarella (white), tomato (red) and basil (green). Sometimes pizza is made in home ovens, but the real Neapolitan pizza must be cooked in a wood-fired oven, hand-made by a pizzaiolo who makes the dough disk thinner in the center and thicker in the outer part; the ingredients and olive oil are rapidly spread across the surface, and with a quick movement the pizza is put on a shovel and slid in the oven where it is turned a few times for uniform cooking.

== Seafood dishes ==
Octopus is held in high esteem. From the Santa Lucia quarter comes the most basic preparation of stewing, polpi alla lucìana, wherein octopus is cooked with chili pepper, garlic, olive oil, parsley and tomato. Rules must be followed in Naples in cooking octopus, the first being "the octopus has got to cook in its own water". This means cooks should not add water when adding octopus to oil, as they releases flavourful juices believed to replenish energy. (Note: According to food writer Arthur Schwartz, prostitutes of Naples in the past would gather at the Saint Lucia docks at the end of their shift as the fishermen came in with their catch. There, they sipped octopus broth "to revive their flagging energy".) The second mandates that the octopus should be cooked with a cork to produce a tender dish. Attaining a tender product is highly prized, and it is believed that only small, double-suckered octopus will become very tender. Octopus is steamed, and prepared as salad with lemon juice, parsley and green olives. A richer seafood salad is prepared also mixing squid, cuttlefish and prawns.

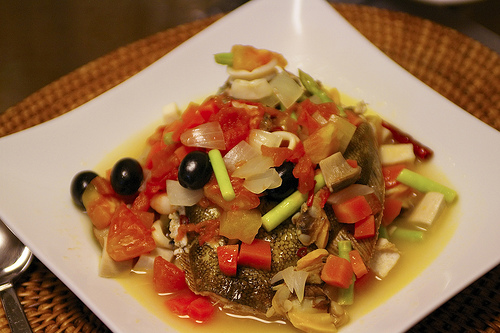
A variation of acqua pazza featuring black olives, scallions and mushrooms

Medium size fishes are cooked all'acqua pazza, with tomato, garlic and parsley; the larger ones are simply grilled, accompanied, in the most important meals, with king size prawns.

Mussels are prepared in different ways: rapidly steamed with black pepper (all'impepata), and dressed with a few drops of lemon juice each; also cooked al gratin. Clams and other shellfishes are also cooked sauté, rapidly passed in a large pan with olive oil, garlic, and served on crust breads.

Cheap fish are also used in some recipes, the most popular of which use anchovy. Some of these include:

- Alici indorate e fritte, boneless anchovies, passed in flour, egg and deep-fried
- Alici marinate, raw anchovies marinated in lemon juice or vinegar, then dressed with olive oil, garlic and parsley
- Alici arreganate, boneless anchovies, rapidly cooked in a large pan with olive oil, lemon juice and origanum

Cicenielli, the tiny baby fishes, are either steamed and dressed with oil and lemon, or deep-fried in a light dough, which is also used to deep-fry little pieces of some sea algae.

Frittura di paranza (deep-fried fishes) is usually done with small-sized local fishes, such as cod, goatfish, anchovies and others. It should be eaten very hot, right after being fried (frijenno magnanno). Baby shrimps, sold alive, are fried with no flour, unlike the paranza.

== Vegetable dishes ==
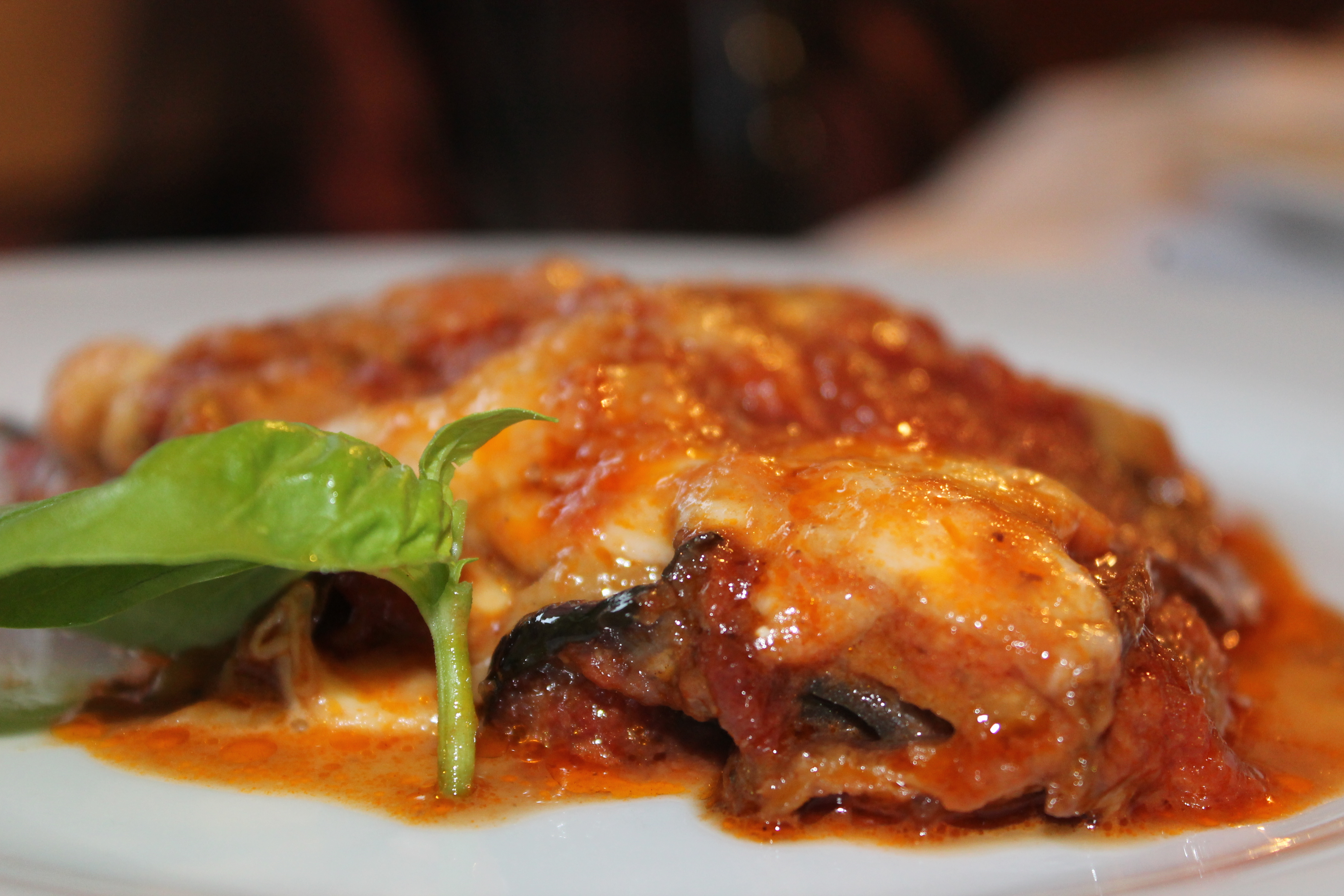
Parmigiana di melanzane

Vegetable dishes can become very rich and elaborated. The most famous are:

- The parmigiana di melanzane, aubergine pie with tomato sauce and fior di latte
- The gattò di patate, potato pie stuffed with cheese and salami
- The peperoni ripieni, stuffed whole peppers
- The melanzane a barchetta, aubergines cut in half, the center scooped out and filled with different types of stuffing.

== Fried food ==
Beyond fried fish, many vegetables are deep-fried with flour and egg (dorate e fritte): artichoke, zucchini, cauliflower. The richest versions add pieces of liver, ricotta and, in the past, cow's brain. Mozzarella can be prepared dorata e fritta as well and also in carrozza, passed in flour and egg together with two bread slices softened in milk, to form a small sandwich. Typical Neapolitan fried food are also the crocchè, stuffed potato balls passed in breadcrumbs and deep fried, or also the sciurilli, zucchini's male flowers fried in a dough, that can also be bought on the streets of Naples historical center in typical fried food shops, called friggitoria, together with scagliozzi (fried slices of polenta), pastacresciute (fried bread dough balls) and aubergine slices.

Onions, fried up to a golden color, are the base for the famous frittata di cipolle (onion omelette).

== Side dishes ==
After pasta, the main second-course meals are frequently accompanied by side dishes. The most popular ones are:

- Zucchine alla scapece, deep fried sliced zucchini dressed with vinegar and fresh mint
- Melanzane a funghetto, fried aubergines, in two versions: stick-shaped and fried, then dressed with cherry tomato sauce, or dice-fried, with no tomato
- Peperoni in padella, sliced peppers pan-fried with black Gaeta olives and capers
- Peperoncini verdi fritti, local small non-spicy green peppers, dressed with cherry tomato sauce
- Friarielli, local vegetable leaves, pan-fried with oil, garlic and chili pepper. They often are side dishes of fried sausages and cervellatine, which are sometimes also accompanied by potato fries, typically cut as small dice.

== Savory pies ==
Savory pies are convenient for outdoor food. The most popular savory pies are:

- The pizza di scarola (endive pie), prepared with fried scarole with garlic, pine nuts, raisins, black Gaeta olives and capers. Those vegetables are the stuffing for the pie, which is made with a simple dough of flour, water and yeast.
- The casatiello or tortano, typical of Easter holidays, usually prepared for the day after Easter, usually spent outdoor.

== Desserts ==
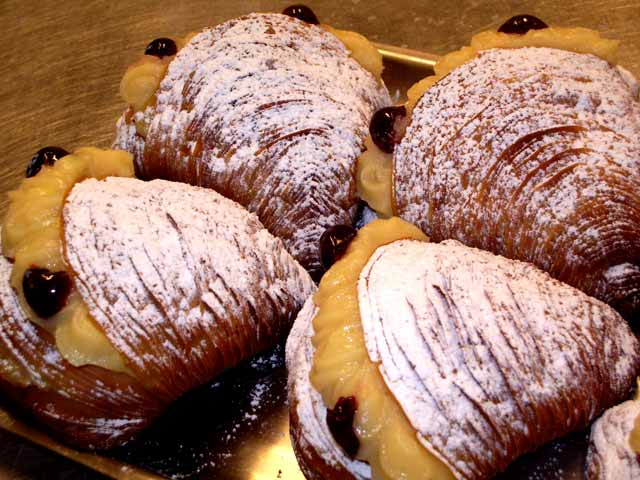
Sfogliatelle Santa Rosa

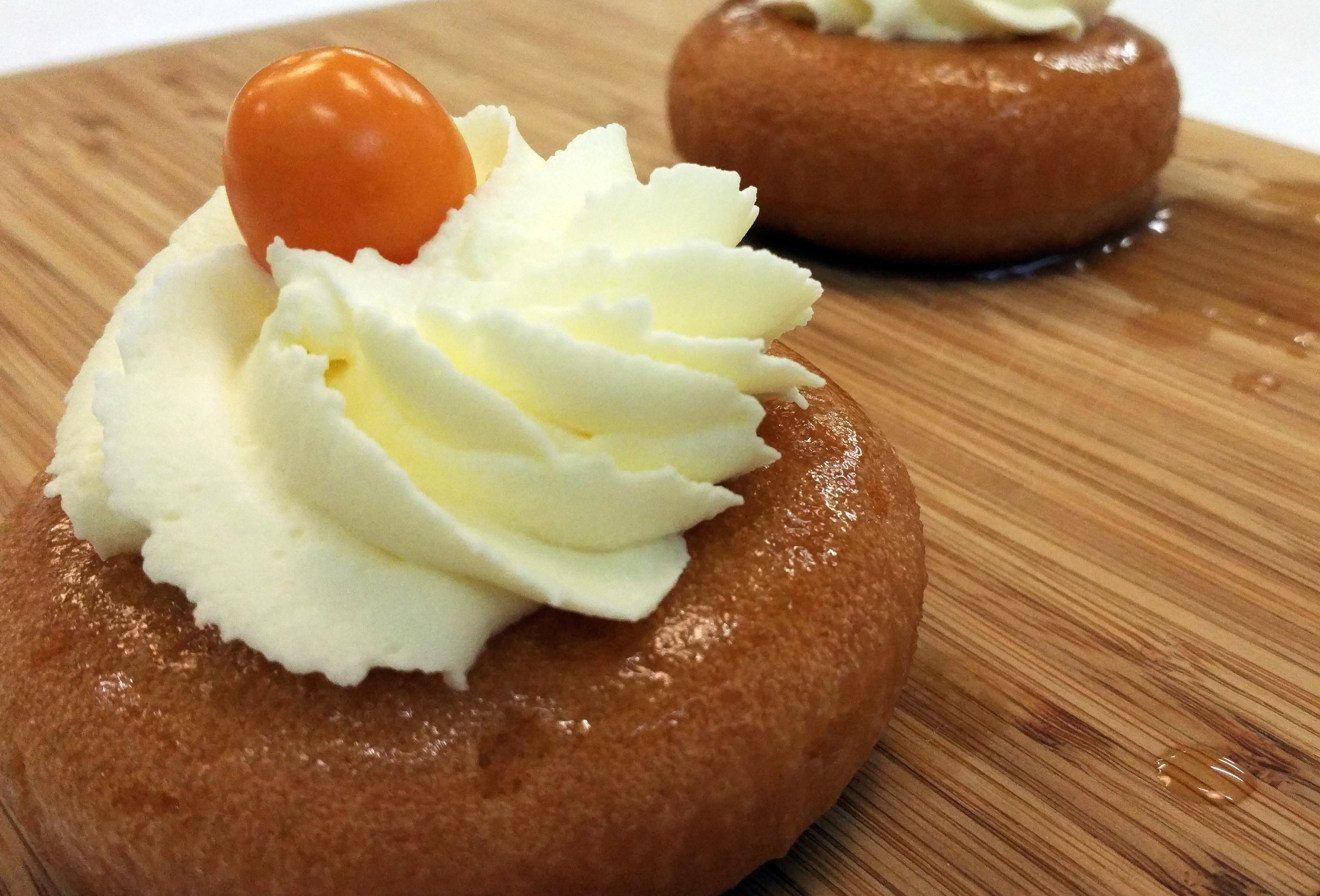
Rum baba

Neapolitan cuisine has a large variety of cakes and desserts. The most famous ones are:

- Babà, small cake saturated in syrup made with hard liquor
- Sfogliatella, in two varieties: frolla ("smooth") or riccia ("curly"). Two variation are the Santa Rosa, larger and with an additional stuffing of cream and black cherry, and the coda d'aragosta ("lobster tail"), with a bignè inside and stuffed with various types of cream.
- Zeppole, deep fried or baked
- Graffe, prepared for the Carnival period
- Pastiera, prepared for Easter holidays
- Struffoli, typical Christmas cake
- Delizia al limone

Ice creams are famous as well. The most traditional are the coviglie and the spumoni.

== Holiday food ==
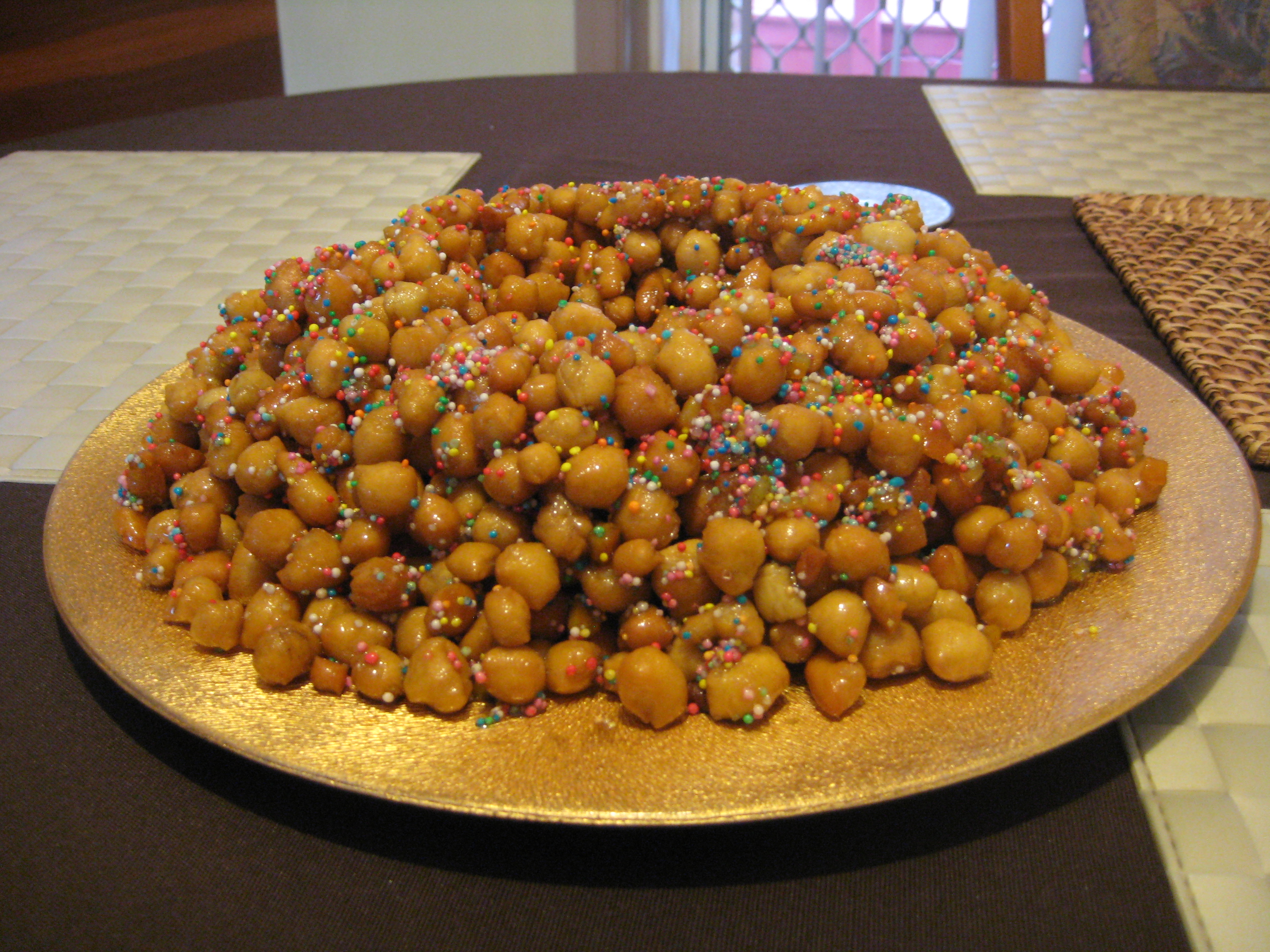
Struffoli

=== Christmas ===
Christmas Eve dinner is usually the time when all family members join. It is typically done with spaghetti alle vongole, followed by capitone fritto and baccalà fritto (deep fried eel and stockfish); as a side-dish insalata di rinforzo is served, a salad made with steamed cauliflower, giardiniera, spicy and sweet peppers (pupaccelle), olives and anchovies, all dressed with oil and vinegar.

Christmas cakes are:

- Struffoli
- Roccocò
- Mustacciuoli
- Susamielli

Christmas Eve dinner is completed with the ciociole, which are dried fruits (walnuts, hazelnuts and almonds), dried figs and the castagne del prete, baked chestnuts.

Christmas lunch has typically the minestra maritata or hand-made pasta with chicken broth.

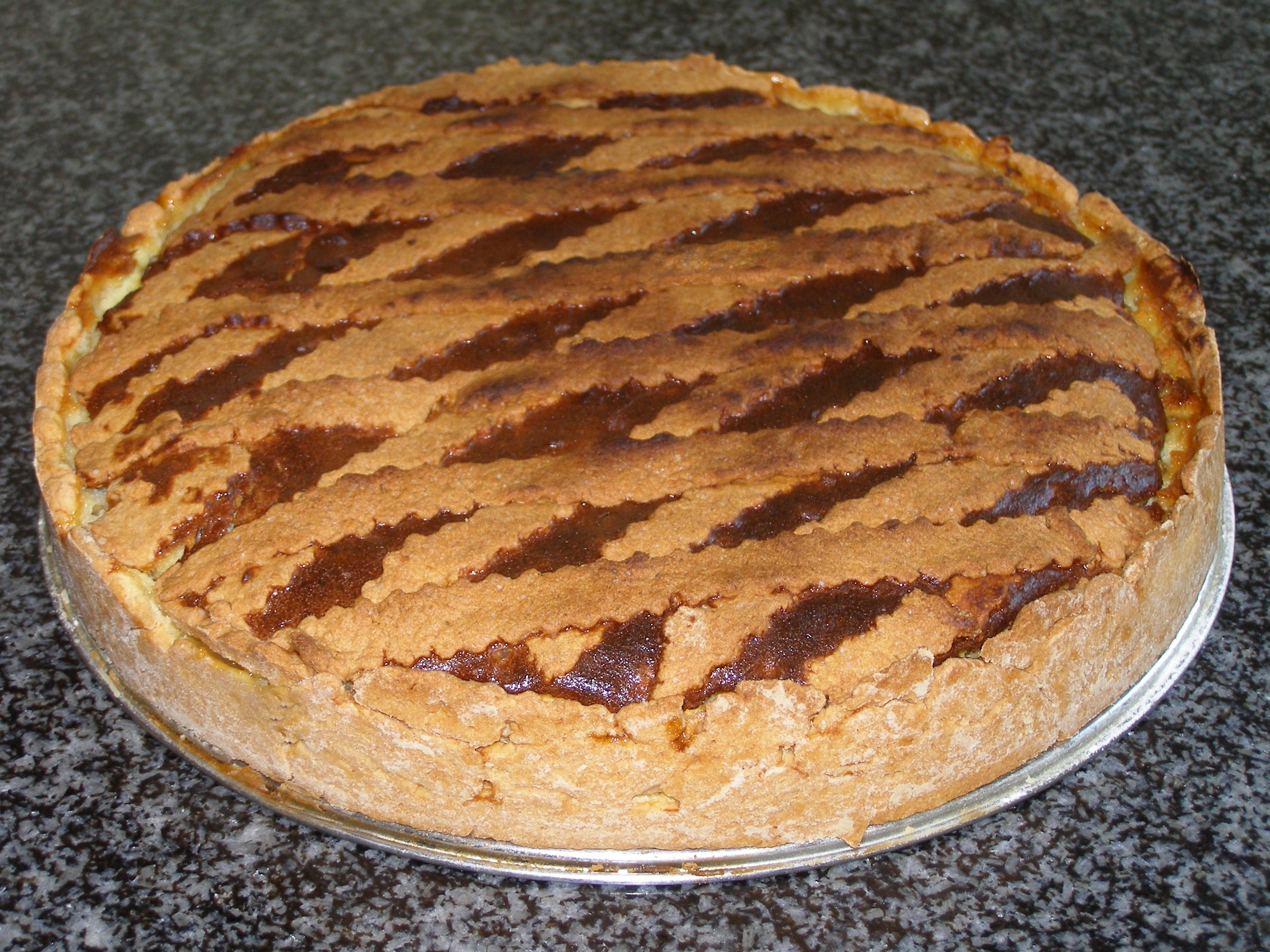
Pastiera

=== Other ===
The main Easter dishes are the casatiello or tortano, a salty pie made with bread dough stuffed with various types of salami and cheese, also used the day after Easter for outdoor lunches. Typical of Easter lunches and dinners is the fellata, a banquet of salami and capocollo and salty ricotta. Typical dishes are also lamb or goat baked with potatoes and peas. Easter cake is the pastiera.

Carnival has the Neapolitan version of lasagna, that has no béchamel sauce, unlike other Italian versions. As dessert, there is the sanguinaccio dolce with savoiardi biscuits, or also the chiacchiere, diffused all over Italy with different names.

2 November (All Souls' Day) cake is the torrone dei morti, which, unlike the usual torrone is not made with honey and almonds, but with cocoa and a variety of stuffings, such as hazelnuts, dried and candy fruits or also coffee and more.

== Fruit ==
Fruit is often present at the end of a meal. Local produce is frequently used, and one of the most popular is the annurca apple, which have been eaten in the region since Roman times. Slices of watermelon ('o mellone) were historically sold in little street shops (mellunari). The yellow peach ('o percuoco c' 'o pizzo in Neapolitan) is also sometimes used, chopped in pieces to flavour red wine coming from Monte di Procida, cold and somewhat similar to Spanish sangria.

== Wine ==
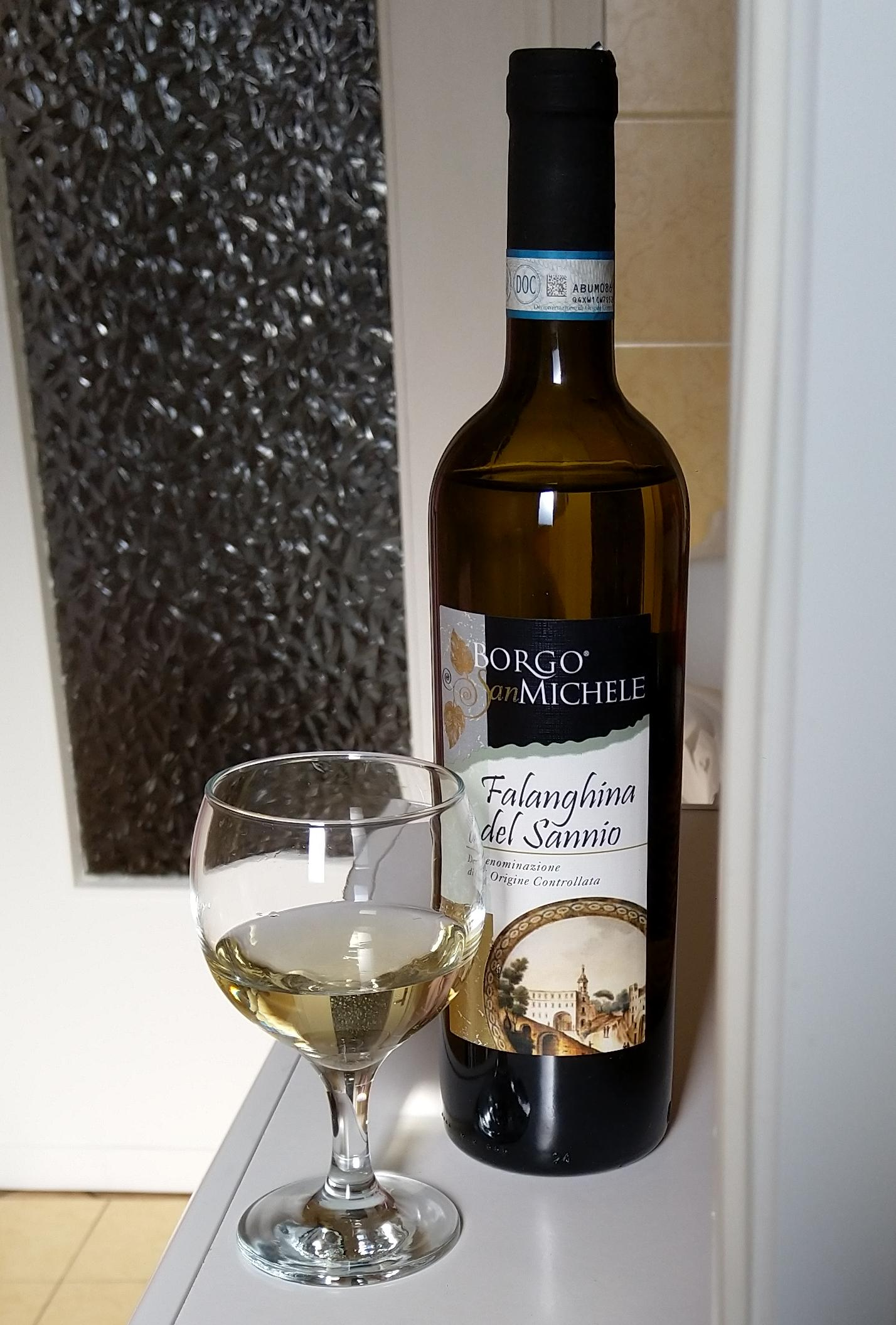
Falanghina wine

Among white wines the most famous are Greco di Tufo, Falanghina, Fiano di Avellino and Asprinio di Aversa, while the most famous red wines are Aglianico del Taburno, Taurasi, Campi Flegrei Piedirosso, also known as pere 'e palummo, Solopaca and Lacryma Christi from Vesuvius, that is produced both white and red.

== Liqueurs ==
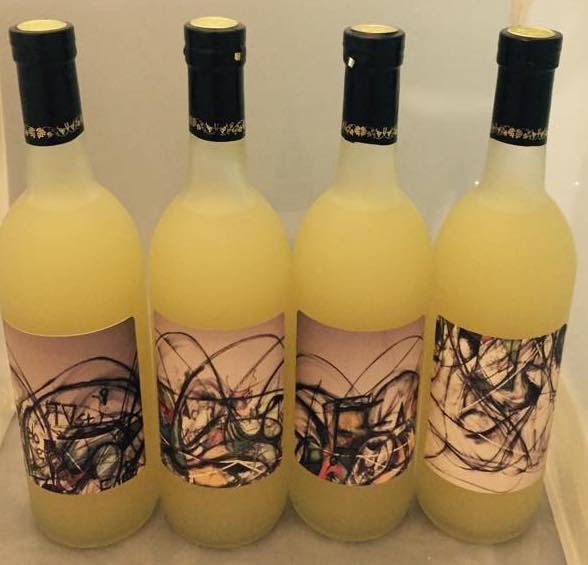
Bottles of limoncello

The most abundant lunches or dinners end with coffee and liqueur. Although limoncello is the most famous variety, historically the most preferred one was the liquore ai quattro frutti, with lemon, orange, tangerine and limo (not to be confused with lime), which is a local variation of bergamot orange, now very rare. Nocino is also very popular all over Italy, and is the most popular bitter liqueur.

== Street food ==
There is a long history in Naples of street food. The origins probably date back to Roman thermopolia or maybe earlier. Typical fried food can still today be bought in little shops, such as pastacresciute (deep fried bread dough balls), scagliozzi (deep fried polenta slices) and sciurilli (deep fried male zucchini flowers), or deep fried aubergines. Pizza is also prepared in small sizes to be eaten in the street, the so-called pizza a libretto, still found in Naples pizzerias in Via dei Tribunali, Port'Alba and Piazza Cavour. In Via Pignasecca, in the historical center, there are still some carnacuttari shops, selling various types of tripe, 'o pere e 'o musso (pork's foot and cow's nose) or the old zuppa 'e carnacotta (tripe soup).

From Mergellina to Via Caracciolo there are still several little shops selling taralli nzogna e pepe (salty biscuits with pork's fat and black pepper). Nowadays the old typical 'o broro 'e purpo (octopus broth) has become extremely rare to find. A few decades ago, street shops sold 'o spassatiempo, a mix of baked hazelnuts, pumpkin seeds, toasted chickpeas and lupins under brine.

=== Fusion cuisine ===
Many Neapolitan cookery books report classic recipes, but also re-interpretations in Neapolitan style of other recipes. So, it is not unusual to find recipes such as cotoletta alla milanese, carne alla genovese, sugo alla bolognese, and other. Books with both classic and revisited recipes are:

- Jeanne Caròla Francesconi, La vera cucina di Napoli, edit. Newton, 1995 (ISBN 88-8183-021-3).
- Frijenno Magnanno, Salvatore di Fraia, Editore, Pozzuoli (NA): contains a large variety of recipes and creative Neapolitan dishes.

== See also ==
- Italian cuisine
  - Cuisine of Abruzzo
  - Apulian cuisine
  - Arbëreshë cuisine
  - Emilian cuisine
  - Cuisine of Liguria
  - Lombard cuisine
  - Cuisine of Mantua
  - Cuisine of Basilicata
  - Piedmontese cuisine
  - Roman cuisine
  - Cuisine of Sardinia
  - Sicilian cuisine
  - Tuscan cuisine
  - Venetian cuisine

== Bibliography ==
The oldest Neapolitan cuisine is reported in the books of classic authors, including:

- Vincenzo Corrado, Il cuoco galante, in Napoletan language, III edition, 1786, editby Forni, Sala Bolognese (BO), 1990.
- Vincenzo Corrado, Pranzi giornalieri variati ed imbanditi in 672 vivande secondo i prodotti della stagione, in Napoletan language, III edition, 1832, re-edit by Grimaldi, Naples, 2001.
- Ippolito Cavalcanti, Cucina casareccia, in Napoletan language, 1839, re-edited by Il Polifilo, Milan, 2005 (ISBN 88-7050-324-0).
- Ippolito Cavalcanti, Cucina teorico - pratica, in lingua napoletana, 1852, re-edited by Grimaldi, Naples, 2002.

== Sources ==
- Montanari, Massimo (2013). Italian Identity in the Kitchen, or Food and the Nation. Translated by Brombert, Beth Archer (English ed.). Chichester, West Sussex: Columbia University Press. ISBN 978-0-231-53508-3.
- Piras, Claudia; Madigani, Eugenio (2000). Culinaria Italy. ISBN 978-3829029018.
- Schwartz, Arthur (1998). Naples at Table: Cooking in Campania. New York: HarperCollins. ISBN 0-06-018261-X.
