= Genovese sauce =

Meat-based Italian pasta sauce

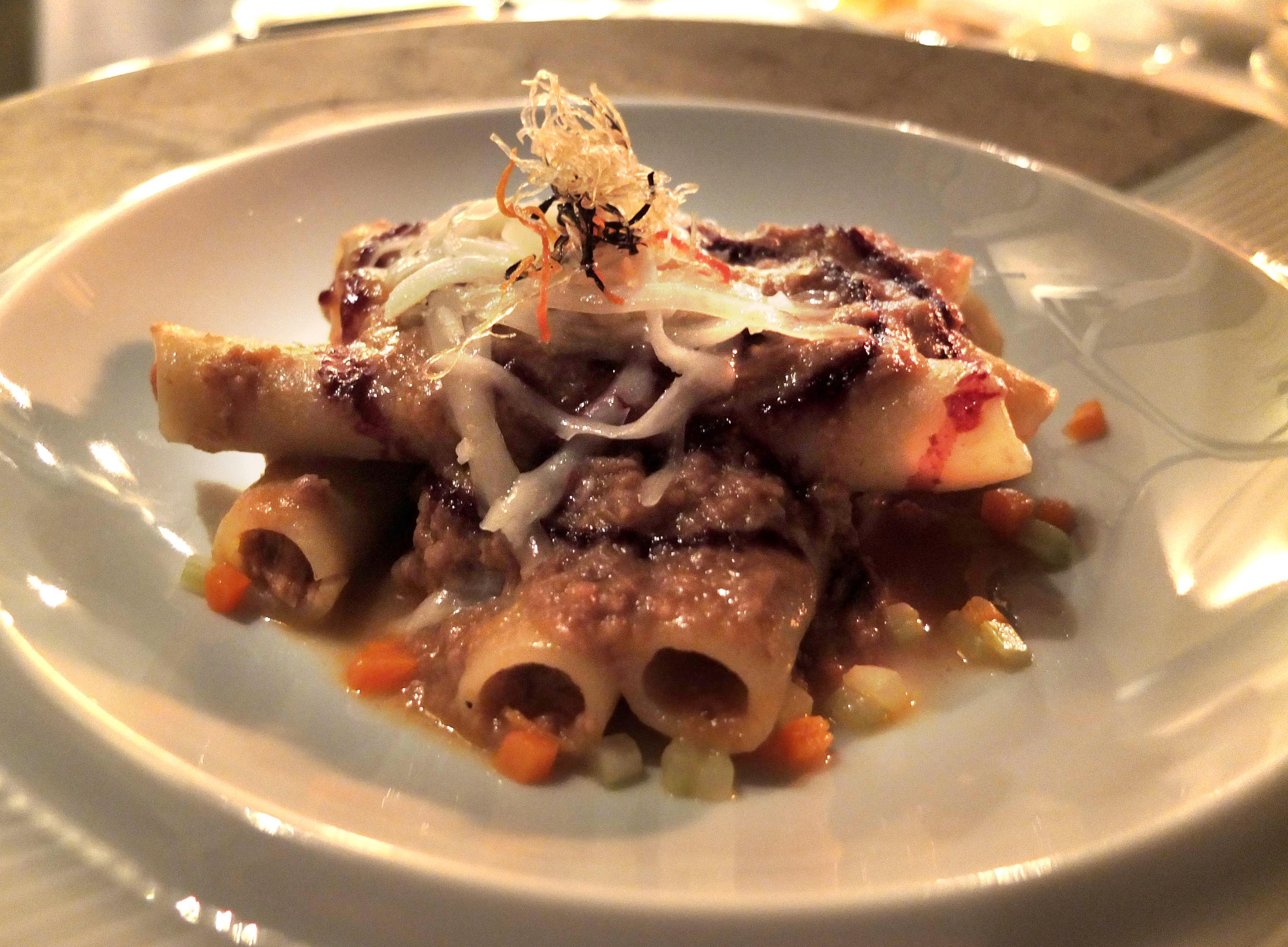
- Genovese sauce with candele pasta served at the Villa Cimbrone in Ravello, Campania, Italy
- Alternative names: Sugo alla genovese (in Italian), "la Genovese" (in Italian)
- Type: Ragù
- Place of origin: Italy
- Region or state: Naples, Campania
- Invented: 15th or 16th centuries
- Main ingredients: Onion and beef, veal or pork

Genovese sauce, known in Italian as sugo alla genovese or "la Genovese", is a slow-cooked onion and meat sauce associated with the city of Naples. It is typically served with ziti, rigatoni or paccheri pasta and sprinkled with grated cheese.

Genovese may be prepared with inexpensive cuts of beef, pork, veal or sausage, but typically emphasizes slow-cooked onions. Recipes may cite the ramata di Montoro, a yellow onion with copper-colored skin.

== History ==
Despite its name, which means 'in the style of Genoa', Genovese sauce is a principal pasta sauce of Naples, having been introduced to the city in the 15th or 16th centuries. Writing in the 1990s, food writer Arthur Schwartz described the sauce as "unknown in Genoa", and more broadly, in Italy outside of Naples. Genovese sauce is held out by some Neapolitans as evidence of the merits of Neapolitan cuisine before the arrival of the tomato.

The sauce may have been brought by Genovese immigrants or merchants, at a time when Genoa and Naples were two of Italy's most important ports. A detailed account of this describes the sauce as the specialty of the private chefs of these merchants who, charmed by the city, stayed and set up food stalls. Schwartz dismisses this, describing the only realistic aspect to be the notion that Genovese merchants had private chefs; the quality of life in Naples at the time was poor, under Spanish rule and frequently afflicted by famine, and Schwartz doubts a shift from cooking for wealthy Genovese to common Neapolitans would be desirable. Other versions account for this by describing the chef's stay as unwilling, a result of a labour dispute or the cost of bringing them back to Genoa being simply unaffordable. Another theory holds that Genovese could be a reference to its inventor's name, since Genovese is a widespread surname in Campania.

The actual sauce is speculated by historians to have evolved from a concentrated meat stock or from the French stew daube. Early published recipes do not closely resemble today's Genovese sauce. This was still the case as of 1837, when Ippolito Cavalcanti gave as his recipe a form of concentrated meat stock, made with a soffritto and no particular emphasis on onions. Over the following years, the ratios shifted: onions increased while carrots, celery and meat declined. One author speculates the volume of onions may reflect a French influence. The meat content continued to decrease, as in Naples meat was perceived as expensive and of poor quality. Occasionally, ham and salami trimmings were used rather than beef. At other times, a finta Genovese (lit. 'Fake Genovese') version was made using macaroni and no meat, which has since been eaten on fasting days. By the 1990s, Naples was more affluent, and Genovese sauce was accordingly dominated by meat.

== Preparation ==
The sauce is prepared by sautéing either beef or veal with onions, and slowly cooking for two to ten hours. The onions are typically accompanied by minced carrots and celery in what is known as a soffritto. In Genovese sauce made with less meat, bouillon cubes are sometimes used to add flavor. In other modern preparations, some tomato paste is added, although this is disliked by purists who emphasize how the sauce precedes the tomato's introduction to Naples.

The slow cooking of the onions is especially important for the sauce's flavor, and is facilitated by incremental additions of white wine, stock or both.

Genovese sauce is not to be confused with pesto from Genoa and Liguria, nor with salsa genovese, a red wine and vegetable condiment for fish, nor with the sauce genevoise from Lake Geneva, again served with fish.

== Serving ==
Genovese sauce is sometimes served over two courses. For a first course, the sauce is separated from the meat, and is combined with pasta cooked al dente. This pasta is typically the large, cylindrical pasta paccheri, as well as rigatoni, ziti or candele—all favored because their shape can hold the sauce. This is finished with extra-virgin olive oil and parmesan over the top. For a second course, the meat is eaten with some remaining sauce and a vegetable side.

== See also ==
- List of meat-based sauces
