= Graffe =

Italian sugar-coated fried doughnuts

Graffe napoletane
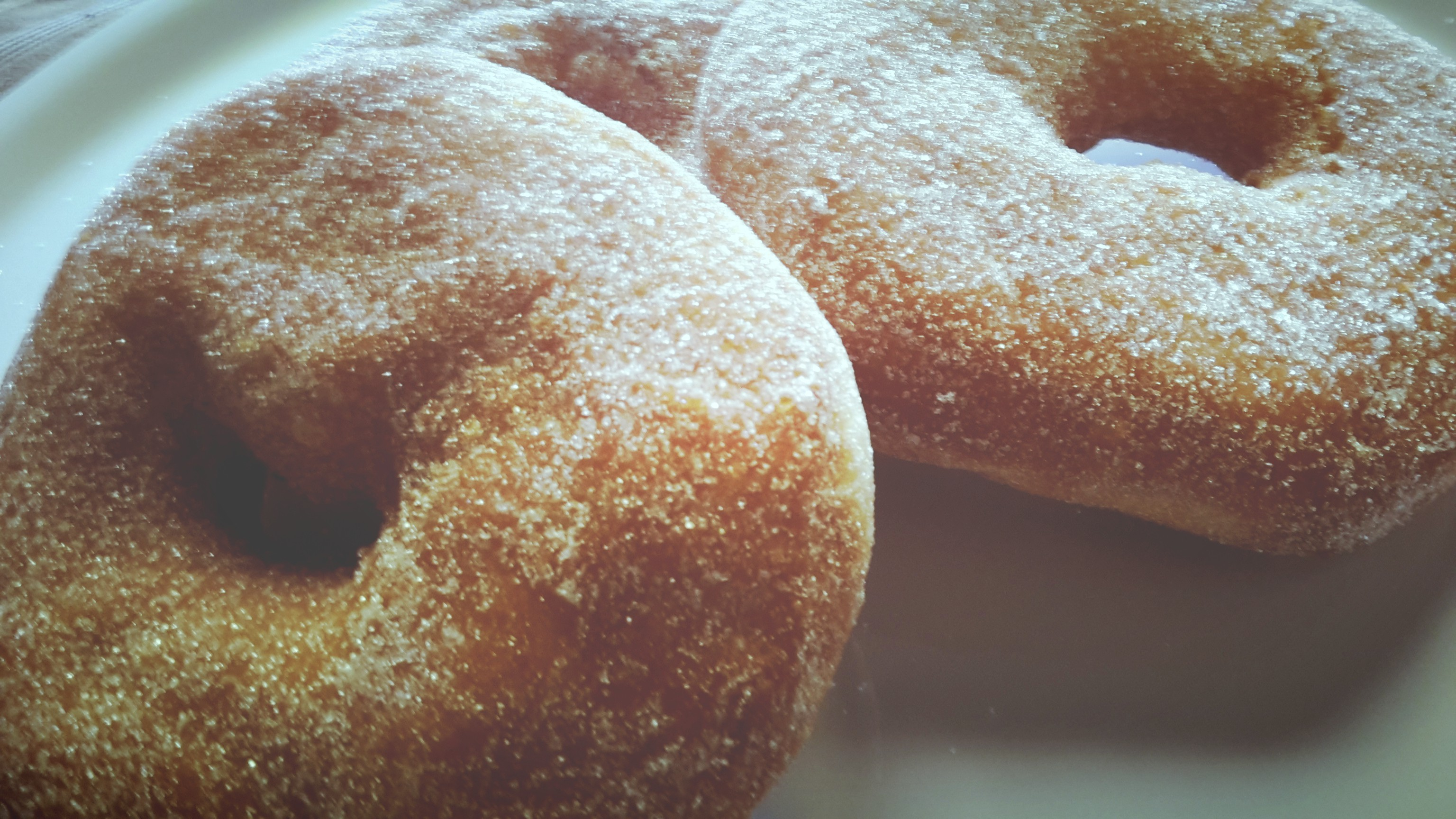
- Alternative names: Graffe napoletane
- Place of origin: Italy
- Region or state: Naples, Campania

Graffe or graffe napoletane are sugar-coated fried doughnuts with a dough made of flour and potatoes.

Graffe are a typical food of Neapolitan cuisine. They are mainly consumed during the Carnival, although they can be found throughout the year.

== History ==
The origin of these pastries in Campania can be traced back to the period of Austrian rule, following the Peace of Utrecht, during the 18th century. Graffe, in fact, are a reworking of German Berliners, small fried doughnuts filled with jam.

== Etymology ==
Graffe and Berliner are etymologically related; according to Italian dictionaries such as DELI and Gradit, the term graffa (or grappa), like krapfen (original name for Berliners) is in fact derived from the Lombard krapfo (krappa in Gothic), meaning 'hook'.

In Old German, the word was used to indicate the appearance that the doughnut originally took on.

== Leavening ==
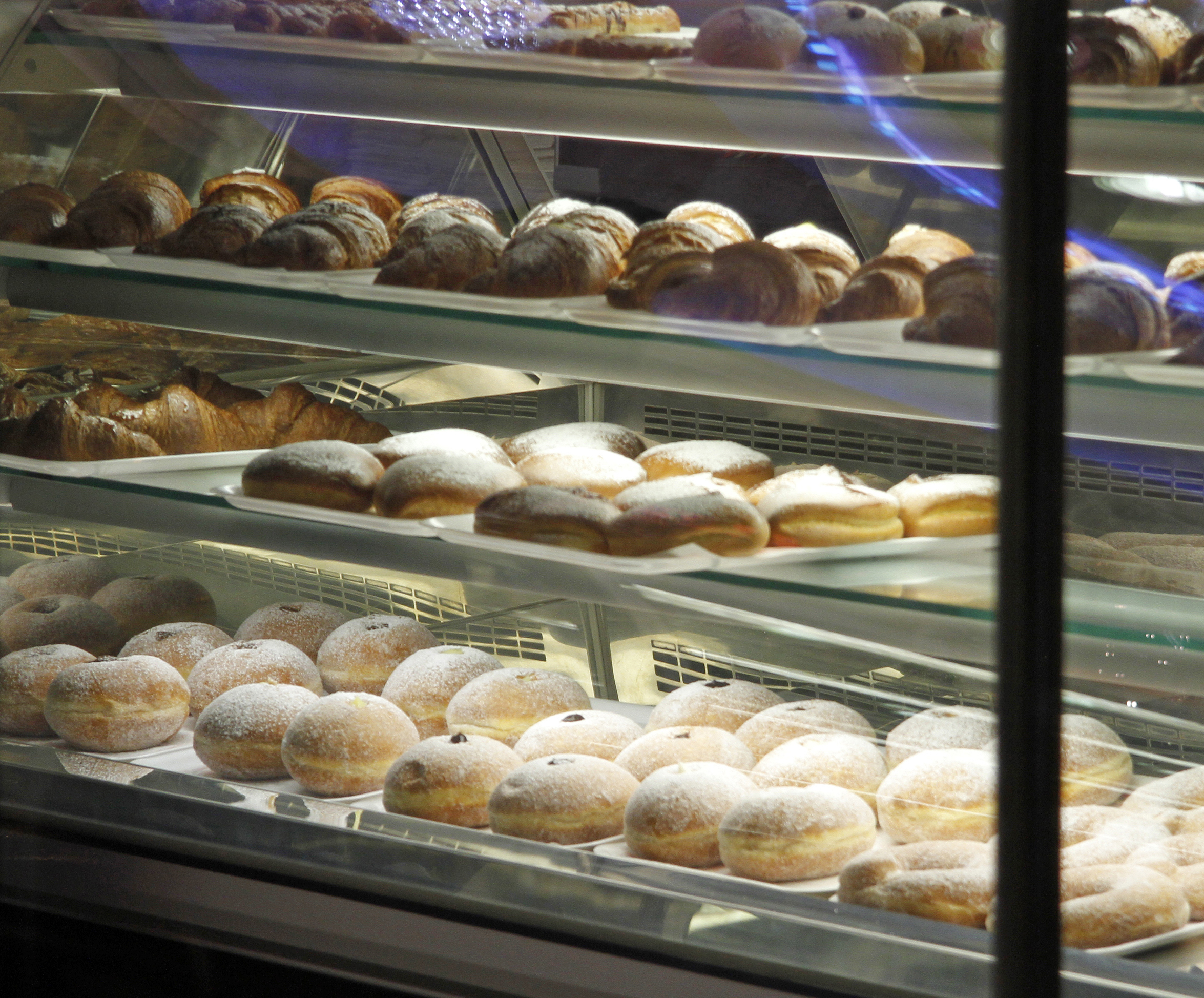
Graffe amongst other desserts, including Berliners

The leavening of graffe's dough is broken down into four different times of about two hours each. Adherence to these times is essential to achieve the final fluffy texture of the doughnuts.

== See also ==
- Neapolitan cuisine
- List of Italian desserts and pastries
