= Zucchine alla scapece =

Fried seasoned zucchini dish

Zucchine alla scapece is a Neapolitan cuisine dish of large slices of zucchini prepared with vinegar, seasoning, and garlic.

An old paraetymology traces the term scapece to the Latin ex Apicio, from the name of the alleged creator, in reality it comes from the Spanish escabeche, with which it has already been used in different parts of the world for making reference to the process of marinating with vinegar.

They are prepared by frying rather large sliced zucchinis and seasoning them with vinegar, garlic and fresh mint leaves or parsley.
