= 'O pere e 'o musso =

Italian street food from Naples

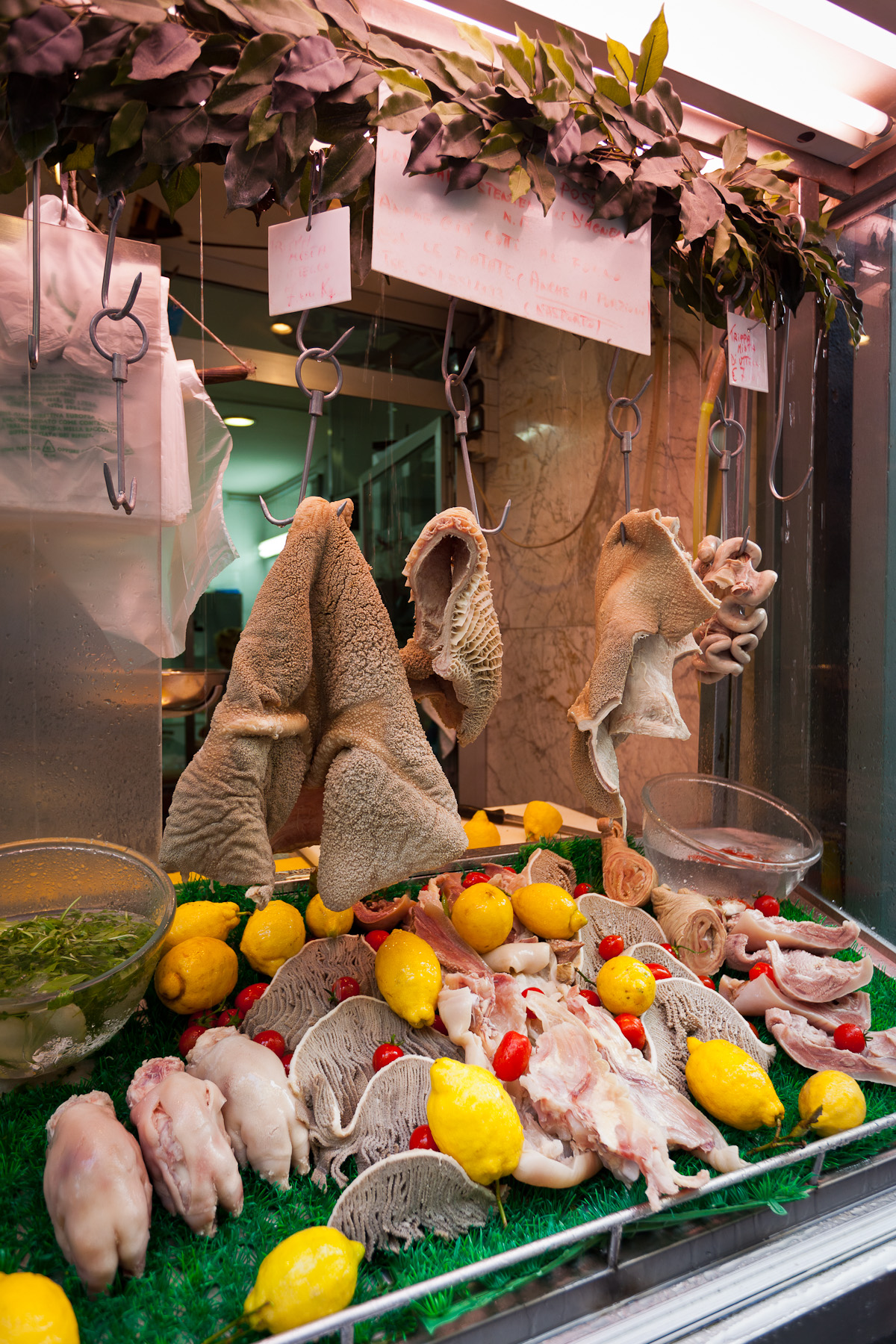
- 'O pere e 'o musso on sale on a truck in the streets of Naples, Italy
- Type: Meat, organ meat
- Course: Secondo (Italian course)
- Place of origin: Italy
- Region or state: Naples, Campania
- Serving temperature: Cool, room temperature or warm
- Main ingredients: Pig feet, cow snout, lemon juice
- Variations: Other organ meat

'O pere e 'o musso (Neapolitan: [o ˈpɛːr(ə) e o ˈmussə]; lit. 'the foot and the muzzle') is a typical Neapolitan dish. Its name refers to its main ingredients: pig's feet and cow snouts. The dish derives from popular tradition and a need to make use of less noble cuts of meat, and is usually sold as street food from carts, in the cities of Campania.

== Preparation ==
This Neapolitan culinary specialty is prepared by boiling pigs' feet with calves' snouts. The ingredients are depilated, boiled, cooled, cut into small pieces and served cold, seasoned with salt and lemon juice. Other seasonings include fennel, lupins, olives or chilli.

Calf's trotters and goat's trotters are sometimes substituted. Additional offal additions include calf tripe of all kinds, cow udder, cow uterus, beef bung.

'O pere e 'o musso can be found in traditional shops and butcheries; however, it is most popularly sold by street vendors using stalls, carts or motorized vehicles, such as apecars.

== See also ==
- Neapolitan cuisine
