= Acqua pazza (food) =

Italian poached white fish or broth

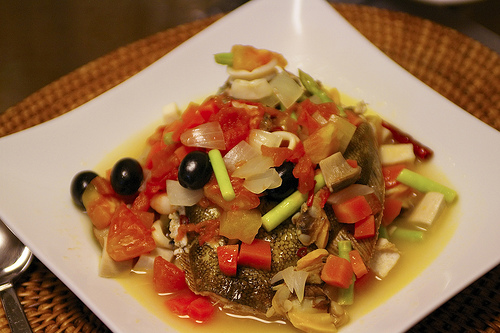
A variation of acqua pazza featuring black olives, scallions, and mushrooms

The term acqua pazza (Italian: [ˈakkwa ˈpattsa]; lit. 'crazy water') is used in Italian cuisine to refer to a recipe for poached white fish, or to simply refer to the lightly herbed broth used to poach it. There are many variations of this sauce, from light broths to thick tomato based sauces, which have been found on all types of seafood (not just the traditional white fish) and even chicken.

Several explanations exist for how the name "acqua pazza" came about. According to food writer Arthur Schwartz, the most credible gives the name as an incredulous reaction to local fisherman cooking their catch in sea water. An alternative explanation has "crazy" referencing the inclusion of chilis in the dish; Schwartz describes this as less likely, because he believes the dish likely predated the introduction of chilis and tomatoes to Italy in the early 16th century. Accordingly, Schwartz describes the earliest preparations of acqua pazza as a combination of water, salt, garlic, parsley, and olive. Acqua pazza became a very popular dish with tourists on the island of Capri in the 1960s, and as of the 1990s, it was the most popular way of preparing small whole fish in Campania.

Aside from the white fish (bass, cod, halibut, sea bream, sea bass, sea perch, etc.), the standard ingredients are cherry tomatoes, water, salt, and olive oil (preferably extra virgin). Larger tomatoes, whole or tinned are also used. However, recipes using a variety of other ingredients as additions or substitutions exist—for instance red snapper, shrimp, and Maine lobster instead of white fish; vegetables such as garlic, celery, carrots, and scallions; and herbs and spices such as pepper, capers, bay leaves, olives, parsley, fennel, and lemon. Some recipes also call for bread (for dipping in the broth). In Campania in modern times, a version of the dish using fillets is sometimes made by first making a broth with fish head and trimmings.

Many restaurants, such as the Acqua Pazza in San Marco, known for seafood and Neapolitan pizzas, and Acqua Pazza in Bologna, which specialises in seafoods and sauces, either share the name with or are named after this dish.
