= Sartù di riso =

Baked rice dish from Naples

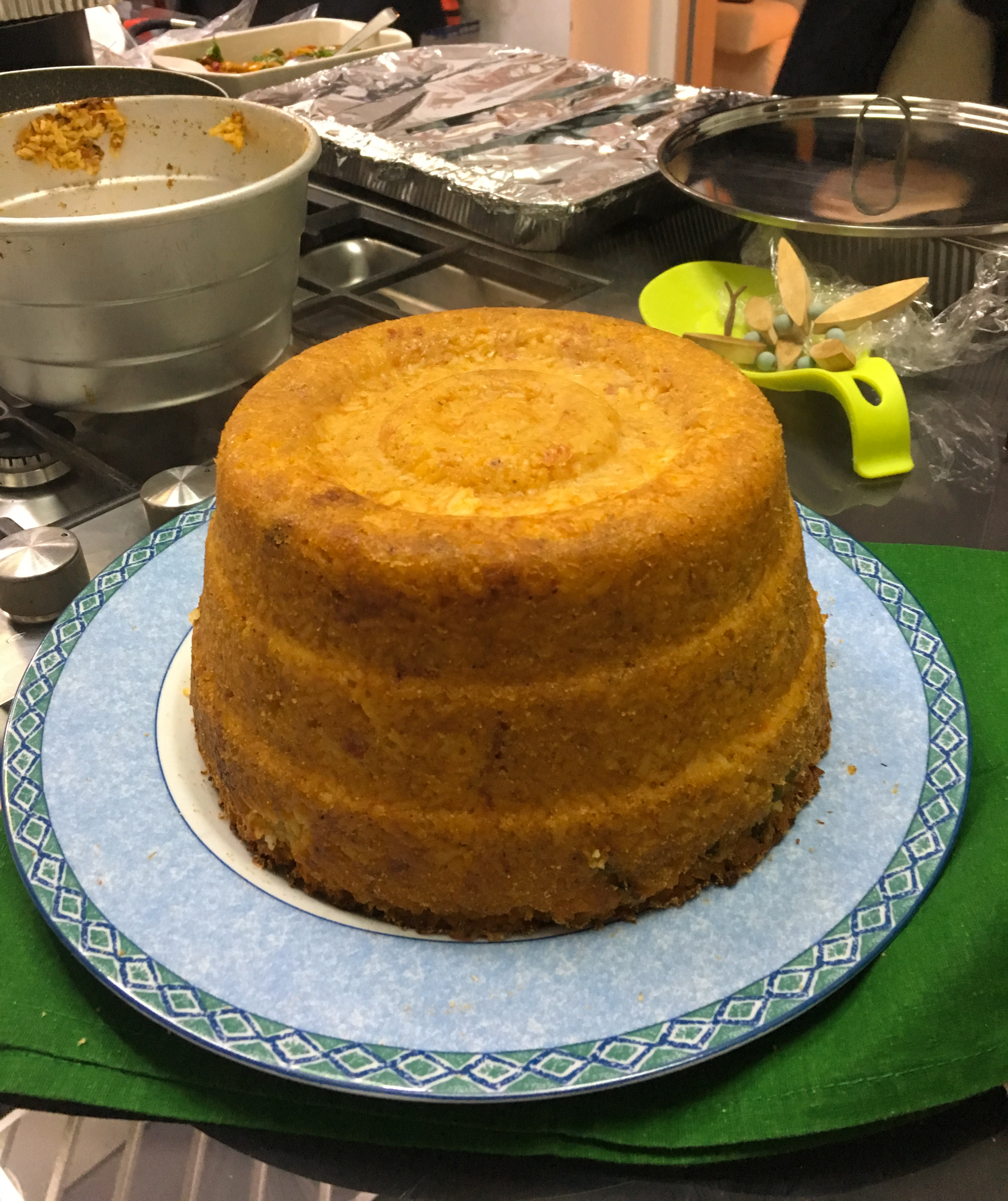
- Course: Primo (Italian course)
- Place of origin: Italy
- Region or state: Campania

Sartù di riso is an Italian dish typical of the city of Naples, Campania. It is prepared with rice seasoned with ragù, peas, pancetta, mushrooms, fior di latte or provola, meatballs, sausages, boiled eggs and, traditionally, with chicken livers. This is baked, and turned out before serving. It can be presented both in the sauce version, with ragù, and in white, without it.

Rice, a product imported by the Aragonese in the Kingdom of Naples, did not find success in south Italy—except in Sicily, where it was introduced by the Arabs. It was adopted by the Salerno School of Medicine and prescribed as a cure for the sick, but not by the people, who preferred pasta. Sartù di riso was probably born from the need to adapt this dish to the taste of the court, under the influence of the Austrian queen Maria Carolina of Austria. Monsù, French court cooks, created this dish in the 18th century, enriching the rice with numerous ingredients and masking the flavor with tomato sauce. The very name of the dish may have come from the French surtout (lit. 'above all'), the centerpiece that was used in the 20th century and that could also be used to bring sartù di riso to the table, cooked like a timballo.

Today, the dish is a point of local pride in Naples. Modern preparations often depart from the elaborate, original formulation, instead preparing risotto, which has other ingredients mixed in.

== See also ==
Media related to Sartù di riso at Wikimedia Commons
