= Falanghina =

Variety of grape

- Grape (Vitis)
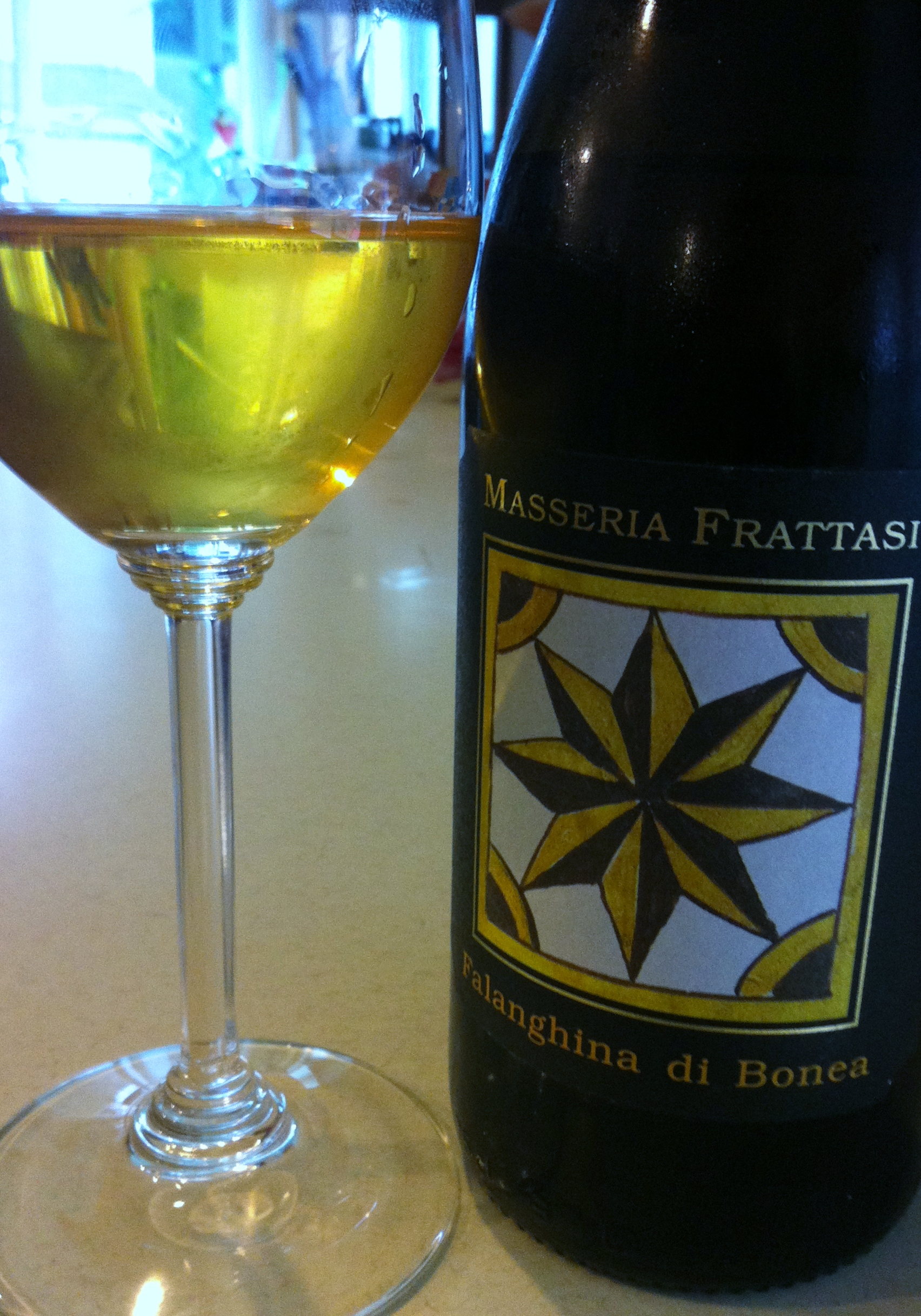
- Color of berry skin: Blanc
- Species: Vitis vinifera
- Also called: See list of synonyms
- Origin: Italy
- Notable regions: Campania
- VIVC number: 4049

Falanghina, also called Falanghina Greco, is a variety of wine grape, Vitis vinifera, used for white wines. It is an ancient grape variety which may have provided a basis for the classical Falernian wine, and has considerable character. It is cultivated on the coast of Campania north of Naples, and frequently consumed in southern Italy along with seafood. The name for the wine appears to derive from the Latin falangae, or stakes for supporting the grapes in a vineyard. In November 2014 Falanghina was approved as a recognized varietal by the Alcohol and Tobacco Tax and Trade Bureau for use in the United States.

== Synonyms ==
Falanghina is also known under the synonyms Biancazita, Biancozita, Biancuzita, Falanchina, Falanchina Bianca, Falanghina Verace, Falenghina, Falernina, Falerno Veronese, Fallanchina, Fallanghina, Folanghina, Montecalvo, Montellese, and Uva Falerna.
