= Paccheri =

Type of pasta

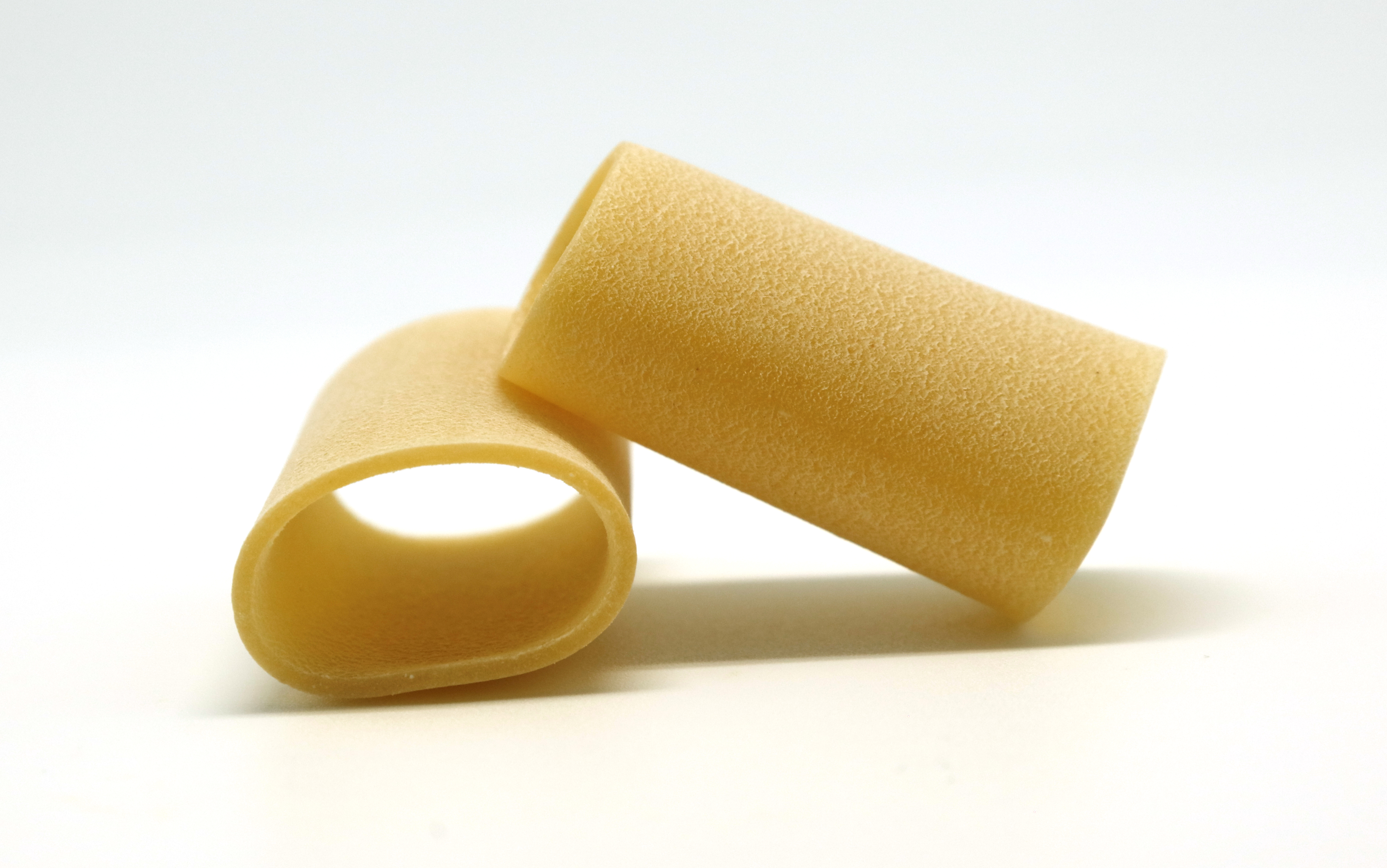
- Alternative names: Maniche di frate, maniche rigate, rigatoni, rigatoncini, schiaffoni, bombaroni, tufoli rigati. Moccolotti in Marche and Umbria.
- Type: Pasta
- Place of origin: Italy
- Region or state: Campania
- Main ingredients: Durum wheat flour

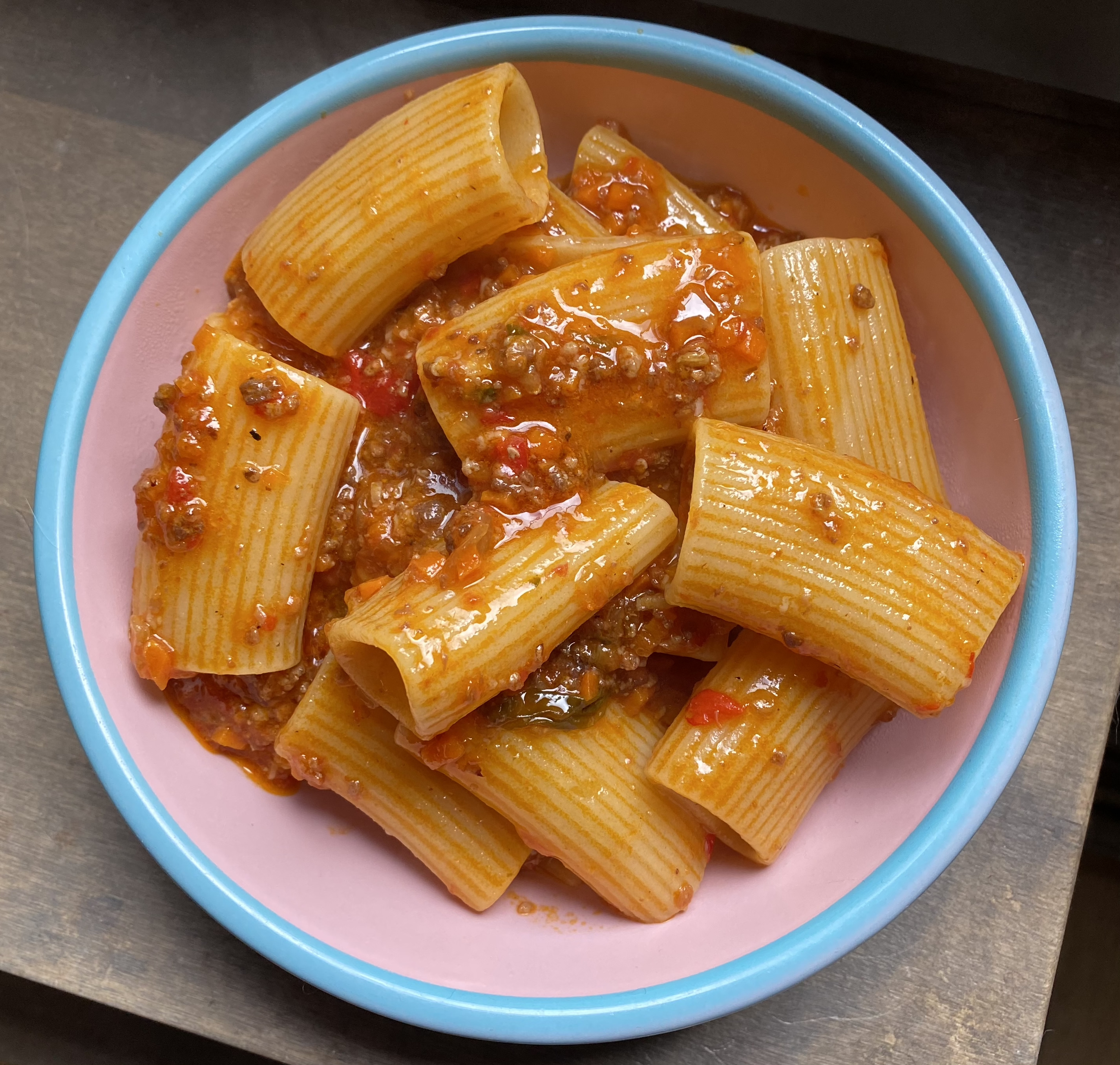
Paccheri with pork ragù

Paccheri (Italian: [ˈpakkeri]) is a type of pasta in the shape of a very large tube, originating from the Campania region of Italy. They are generally smooth, but there is also a ribbed version, paccheri millerighe. The name comes from Neapolitan paccharia, 'slaps', with a depreciative -ero suffix (-eri in plural) to indicate something common. The name has been ascribed to a slapping sound they may make when eaten. They can be served stuffed, and are commonly prepared with beans, or with ricotta and tomato sauce in Campania. As they are eaten, they split open, forming a flat sheet. In the late 1990s, food writer Arthur Schwartz described paccharia as the most popular large tube pasta in Campania.

== See also ==
- List of pasta
