= Spaghetti alle vongole =

Italian pasta dish

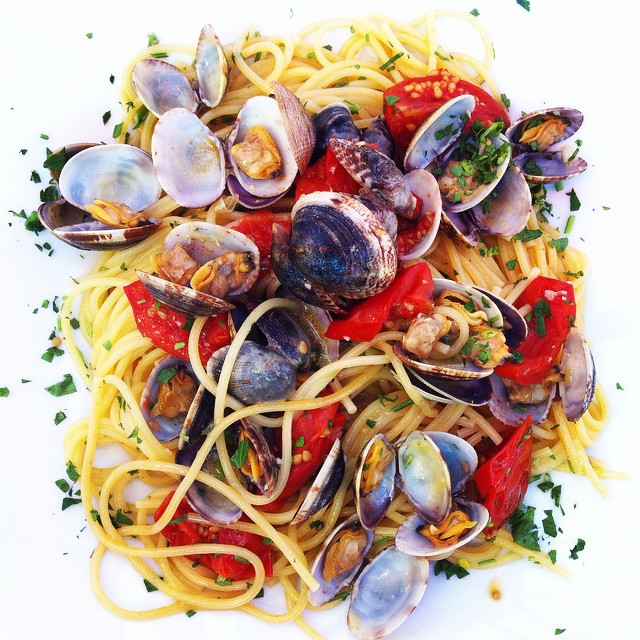
- Alternative names: Spaghetti con le vongole
- Course: Primo (Italian pasta course)
- Place of origin: Italy
- Main ingredients: Spaghetti, clams, parsley, extra virgin olive oil, garlic

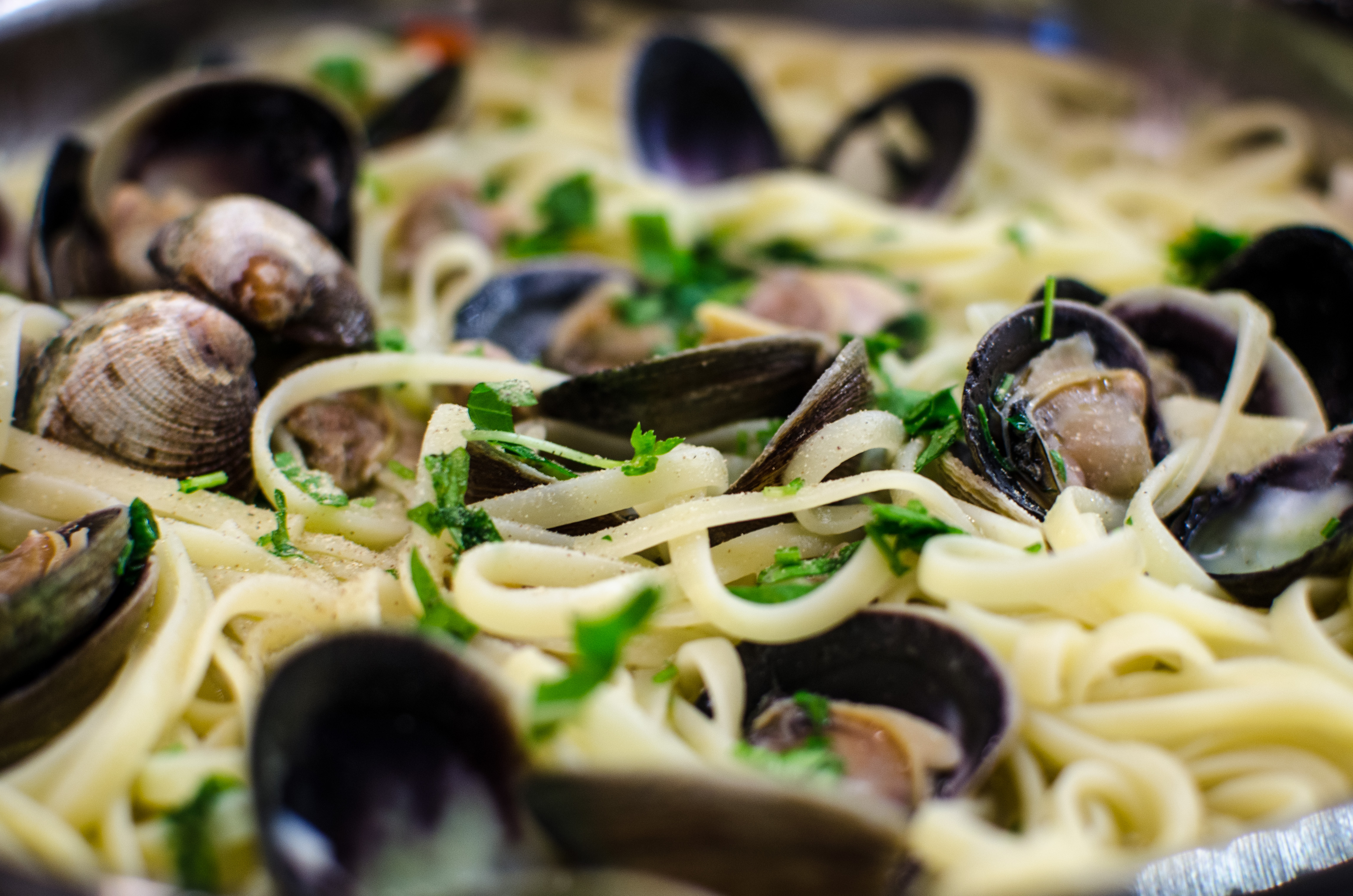
Linguine alle vongole

Spaghetti alle vongole (Italian: [spaˈɡetti alle ˈvoŋɡole, - ˈvɔŋɡole]; lit. 'spaghetti with clams') is a pasta dish consisting of spaghetti cooked with fresh clams, originating in the coastal regions of Italy, particularly in southern Italy. The preparation typically involves garlic, parsley, olive oil, and occasionally white wine. Palourde, or carpet-shell clams (Italian: vongole veraci; pl.), are commonly used, along with the small Mediterranean wedge shell (Donax trunculus, also known as the Tellina or "bean clam"). There are numerous regional variations of the dish.

== Types of clams ==
Palourde, or carpet-shell clams (Italian: vongole veraci; pl.), are used, or the small, Mediterranean wedge shell (Donax trunculus, also known as the Tellina or "bean clam"). Both types are also called arselle in Liguria and Tuscany.

== In Italy ==
Italians prepare this dish two ways: in bianco, i.e., with oil, garlic, parsley, and sometimes a splash of white wine; and in rosso, like the former but with tomatoes and fresh basil, the addition of tomatoes being more frequent in the south. Traditionally, the bivalves are cooked quickly in hot olive oil to which plenty of garlic has been added. The live clams open during cooking, releasing a liquid that serves as the primary flavoring agent.

== In the United States ==
Italian-American recipes sometimes use cream in this dish, but in Italy, its area of origin, this would be considered most unorthodox. Gillian Riley considers cream alien to the spirit of Italian cooking, remarking that "the way cream dumbs down flavor and texture is not appropriate to the subtle flavor and consistency of pasta".

In the United States, cheese is sometimes added to the dish, although Italians state that it overpowers the simple flavors of the clams and of good-quality olive oil.

== See also ==
Media related to Spaghetti with clams at Wikimedia Commons Spaghetti with Clams at the Wikibooks Cookbook subproject

- List of pasta
- List of pasta dishes
