= Campanian cuisine =

Regional Italian cuisine

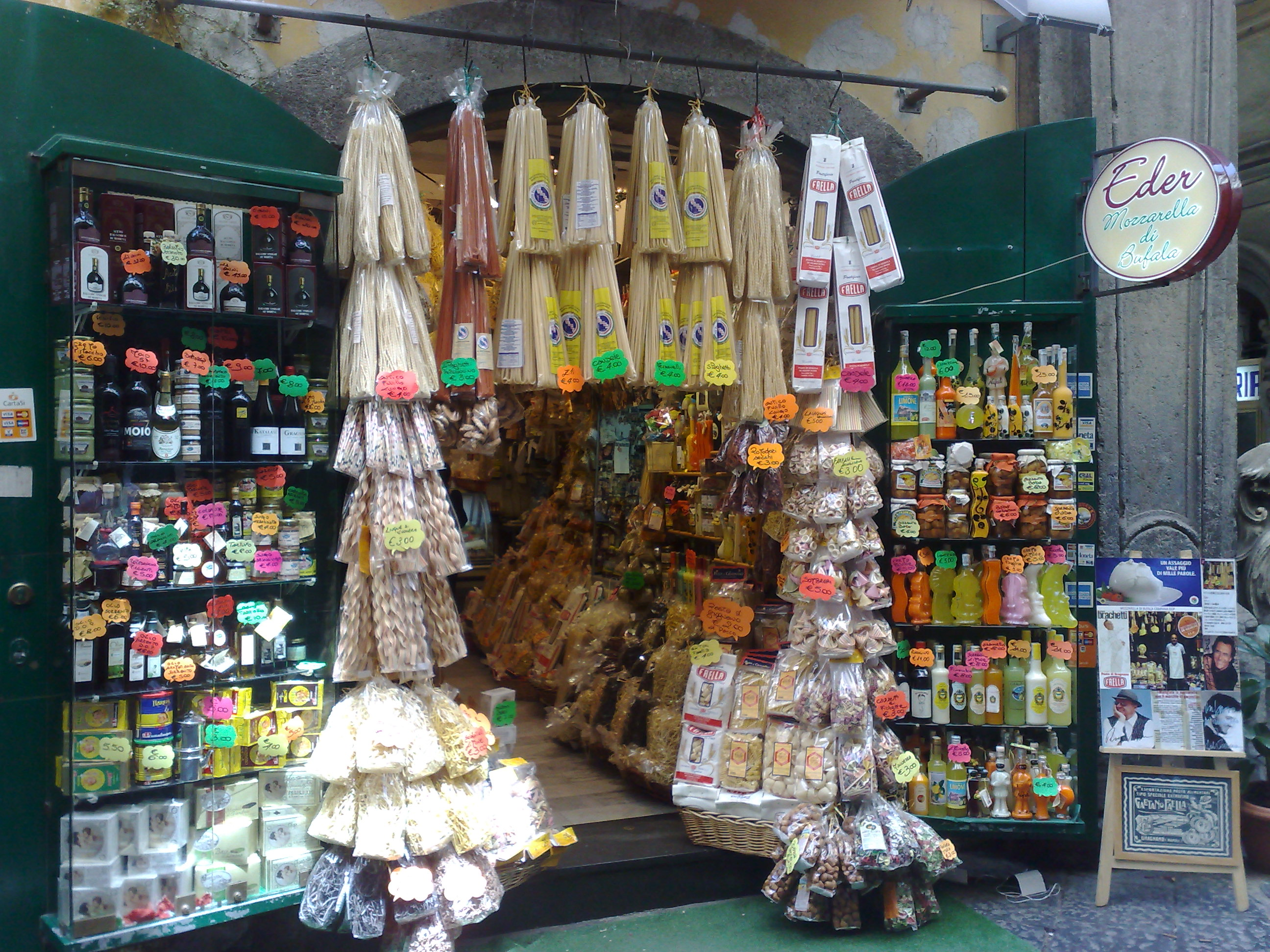
A shop in Naples sells foods typical of Naples and Campania.

Campanian cuisine encompasses the culinary traditions of the Southern Italian region of Campania.

Within Campania, culinary practice varies by location, between provinces and sometimes towns. Over small distances, these changes are gradual, but over large distances they become more pronounced, causing the cuisine in some northern areas to more closely resemble the regions they border than those further south within Campania. Some commonalities in dishes and foodways exist across Campania, and the cuisine of Naples exerts a strong influence, as it has done over Southern Italy for centuries.

== Geography ==
The provinces of Campania

Near the city of Naples sits Mount Vesuvius, an active volcano visible across the region. Over thousands of years of eruptions, the volcano's lava flows have produced a black, fertile soil in the surrounding area. For this fertility, the Romans named the part of the region with which they were most familiar, covering from Naples to Lazio, Felix Campania ("Fortunate Campania"). In the soils of the plains, they harvested between two and four crops per year, which remains true today despite thousands of years of intervening agricultural use.

Elsewhere in Campania, where the soil is less fertile than it is around Naples, fewer crops are grown. In the northern plains of the Province of Caserta, crops—fruits, vegetables, chestnuts, and tobacco—are grown intermittently to permit the soil to replenish its nutrients, and in the inland, mountainous provinces of Avellino and Benevento to the north-east of Naples, cereals and grapes are grown, alongside hazelnuts in Avellino. In the plains of Salerno and Caserta water buffalo are reared, as well as in valleys, made accessible through projects preventing periodic flooding. Inland, little seafood is eaten, and many dishes are based on pasta made without eggs.

Below the city of Naples, the plains give way to an area containing cliffs on which citrus and grapes are grown on terraces. Sorrento, a town in the area, specialises in walnuts. Further down is Salerno, which contains mountains on which olive trees are grown, a bay, and plains situated below the capital city, containing orchards and vegetable gardens.

== History ==
Various foodstuffs and techniques used in Campanian cuisine have been introduced as groups occupied areas of Southern Italy. Under the Ancient Greeks, durum wheat, olives, and grapes were planted. From Sicily under Arab rule, almonds, honey, raisins, lemons, oranges, and pine nuts entered the Campanian cuisine, along with orange blossom water and the technique of stuffing vegetables. At times, strong influence came from the Spanish and French. In Benevento, a portion of the population identify as descendants from the ancient Italic people of the Samnites, describing their cuisine as cucina sannita.

The notion that a cooking style could be understood as "Campanian" existed as early as the late 13th century, when the earliest cookbook on Italian cooking, Liber de Coquina, described "small leaves" (likely cabbage), prepared in the "Campanian manner". Vegetables were the foundation of the diet for most Campanians until the mid-16th century, and the people were known internationally as mangiafoglie (leaf-eaters).

== Produce ==
Garlic is used in small quantities in Campanian cooking, where it is often simmered in oil to impart flavour before being removed. An exception is seen in the mountainous regions, which permit some browned, crispy garlic as garnish. Few dishes use both garlic and onion, based on perceptions that the two would "cancel each other out".

Marjoram, mint, and oregano grow wild across Campania. The flavours of oregano and marjoram vary dramatically across geography, and are used interchangeably at times when oregano has taken on enough sweetness. Oregano is almost always dried before use. The other major herbs of Campanian cooking are basil and parsley. Cooks prepare these in different ways: basil may be added to dishes whole, sliced, or torn, while parsley is often only run through once with a knife to prevent the release of aromatic compounds that comes with many cuts. Some herbs are associated with other foods, for instance basil with tomato, and mint with grilled zucchini and fish.

The peaches of Campania are held in high regard across Italy, and marketing in other areas of Italy emphasizes a Campanian origin. Locally, the morello cherry is highly valued and expensive. is the main producer of walnuts in Italy, with the harvest taking place from September to March. These are eaten in cooked preparations, as well as uncooked, with fruit, at the end of meals.

== Pantry ==
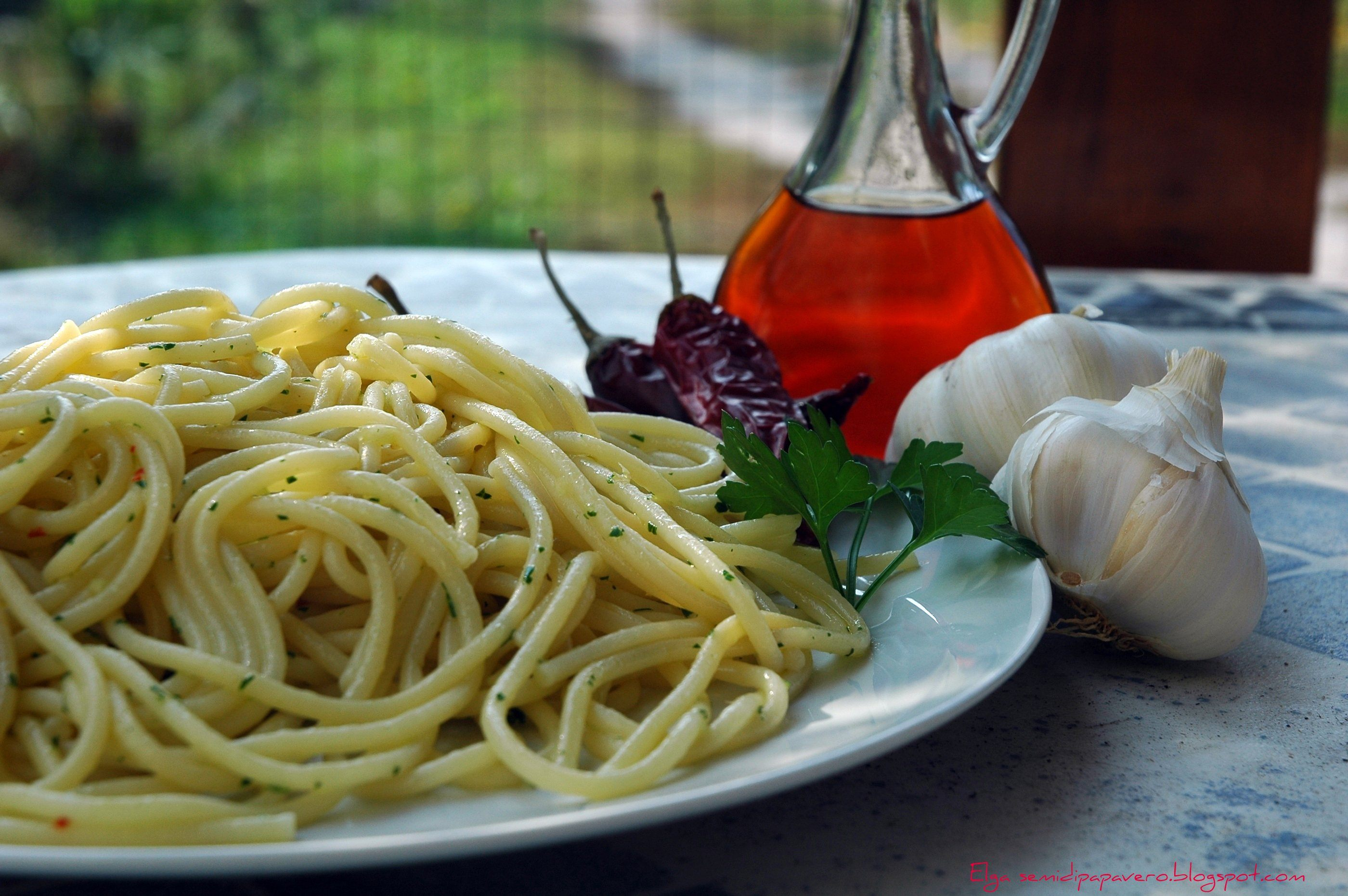
Spaghetti with colatura di alici

Anchovies, sold packed in salt whole with their bones, are used in Campanian cooking to add flavour. Salerno is known for their anchovies, which are eaten locally spread across bread with butter. The juice released from anchovies as they cure (known as colatura di alici) is also consumed, used to season spaghetti. (Note: The colatura di alici made historically in Campania is viewed locally with nostalgia. This was produced in wooden barrels, after they were retired from use in wine-making.)

Until the 1970s, the primary fat used in Campanian cooking was lard. While it is still used in some dishes, beliefs around health effects have led to its replacement by olive oil and sometimes margarine. The region produces large amounts of olive oil with olives grown elsewhere in Italy. This oil has a fruity flavour, neither as heavy as the oil produced in Tuscany nor as light as that produced in Liguria. Campanians use extra-virgin olive oil in a myriad of cooking applications, opting for vegetable oils to fry when costs make olive oil inaccessible.

== Sweets ==
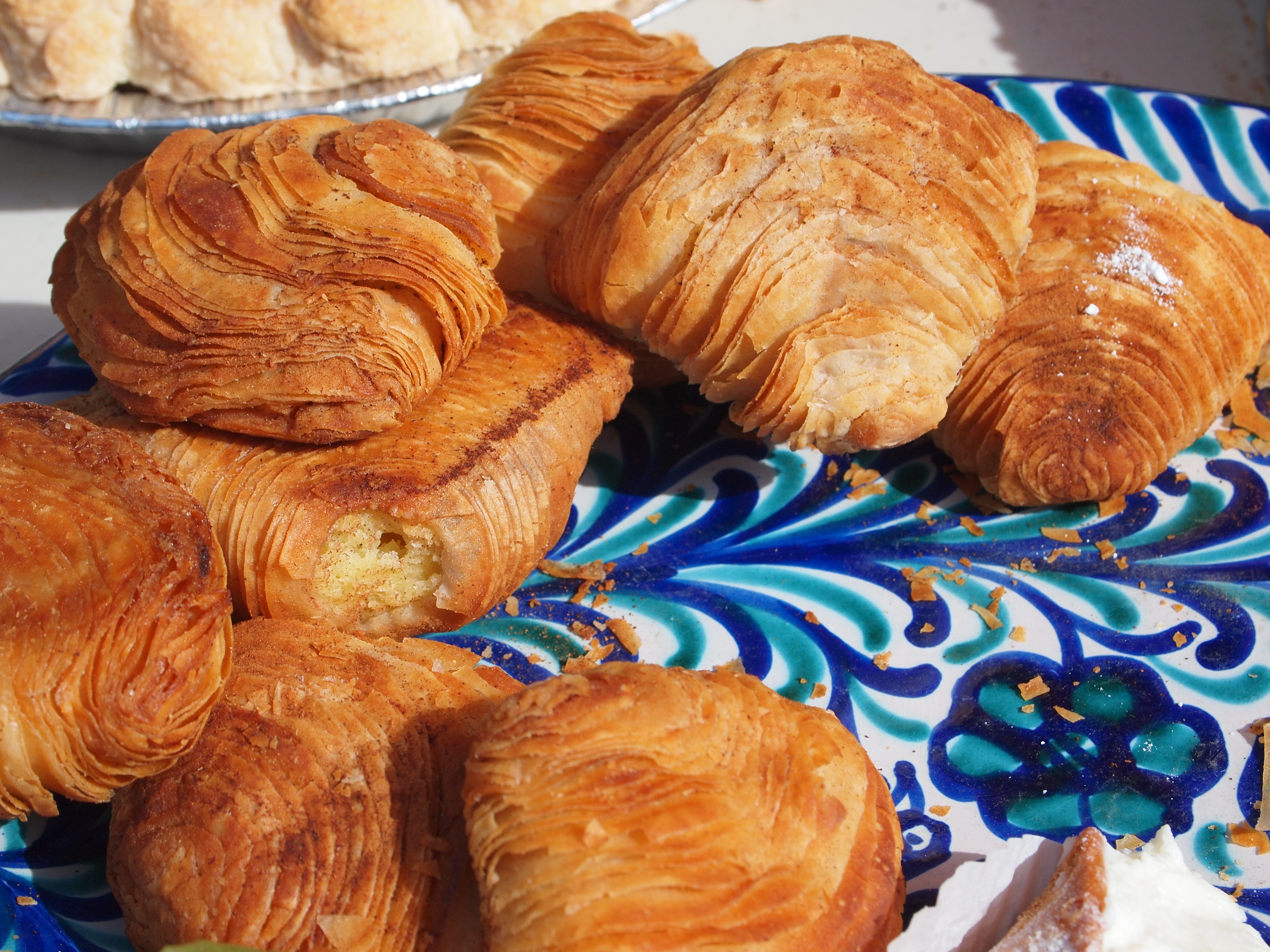
Sfogliatella

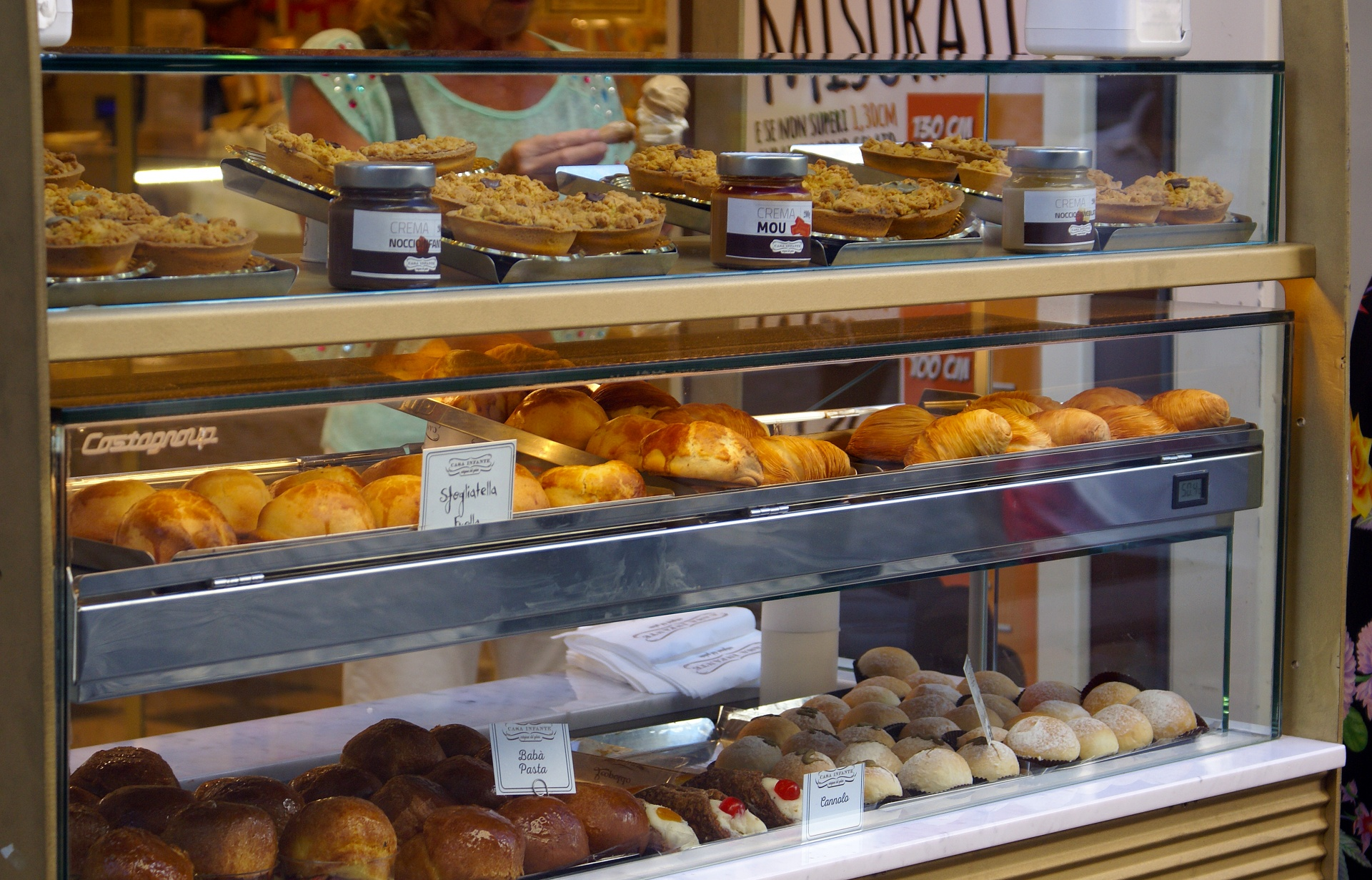
Pastries on display in Naples

Sweets in Campania take the form of baked goods and pastries, frozen desserts, and iced drinks. Egg-rich pastry cream, thickened and flavoured, features prominently; used as a base for frozen desserts, as a layer in fruit tarts, and to fill pastries and cakes including zeppole, cream puffs, sponge cakes, and zuppa inglese. Desserts built from ladyfingers, sponge cake, or cream puffs are known locally as delizia and often have an element of alcohol dousing the cake, typically rum, brandy, or a liqueur. In areas which produce alcohol, the local beverage is preferred: Strega in Benevento, and limoncello in Amalfi, Capri and Sorrento. Rum baba, a small, leavened cake soaked in rum and syrup is very popular despite its origin outside the region—food writer Arthur Schwartz describes it as the "king of the cakes" in Naples.

Few desserts in Campania are made at home, and the average home cook has a repertoire limited to simple cakes and puddings, for example pineapple upside-down cake, baked apple, (Note: Variations of baked apples include preparations using white wine or fruit preserve.) and torta caprese. Most pastries and cakes are purchased at pasticceria ('pastry shop'). Sfogliatella, a shell-shaped pastry filled with semolina or ricotta often flavoured with orange blossom water is popular in cafés across Campania in the mornings. Another widely consumed pastry is pastiera, a tart containing an egg, ricotta, and whole wheat filling. Although as of the 1970s it was only made during Easter, it is now eaten year-round. Torta caprese, associated with Capri but sold across Campania, is made from chocolate and ground almonds, and without flour or leavening. In almost all renditions, a design in sugar is stencilled across the surface.

Several desserts are made during holidays, sometimes having originated as specialties of monasteries. Struffoli, a pyramid of fried dough balls coated in a syrup, is made at Christmas and during the last week of Carnival, the dough and the syrup flavoured with lemon, honey, orange and spices. A beignet version of zeppole is eaten during Saint Joseph's Day, while a heavier, unleavened zeppole that has been dunked in hot honey is popular at Christmas. Also eaten at Christmas are several spiced cookies, including the chocolate-coated mustacciuoli. During the season of Lent, quaresimali, a type of biscotti are eaten. They contain large quantities of whole and ground almonds, and have no fat added in accordance with Lenten obligations. In the middle of the Italian summer during the Feast of the Assumption, melanzane al cioccolato is made in homes along the Amalfi Coast. Cooks layer fried eggplant and melted chocolate, and add fillings such as candied fruits and pine nuts.

Meals are most commonly ended with fresh fruit, often apples, apricots, citrus, cherries, figs, or peaches. Frozen desserts, such as semifreddo, spumoni and granita, also often feature.

== Beverages ==
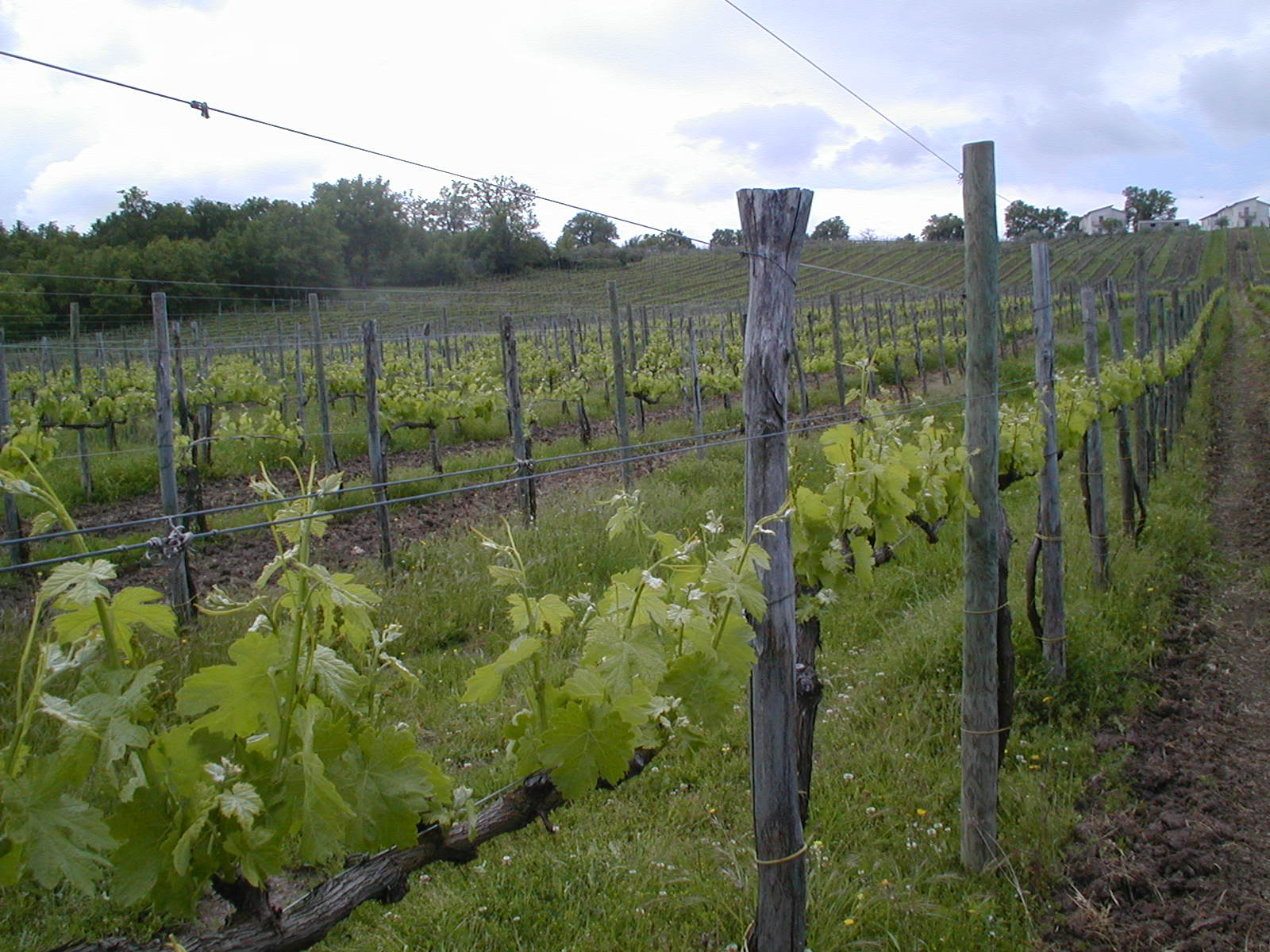
Vineyard in Avellino

Local coffee is made using the Neapolitan flip coffee pot, which uses gravity to force water through the grounds. The drink produced has a less intense flavour than that made in moka pots or espresso machines, which operate using steam and pressure. Limoncello, associated with Amalfi, Capri, and Sorrento, is produced commercially and in homes across Campania. Unlike elsewhere in Italy, Campanians often serve limoncello at room temperature and understand it as an indulgence rather than a digestif. Recipes often include both green and yellow lemons: green for fragrance, yellow for flavour.

Large quantities of wine are produced in the region, with most not held in high regard internationally. An exception is seen in the area around the city of Avellino, where grapes of the Greco, Fiano, and Aglianico varieties are grown. These are used to produce the wines Greco di Tufo and Fiano di Avellino, both very dry whites, and Taurasi, a long-aged red with a strong flavour. Other wines of Campania include those produced on the islands of Capri and Ischia, Sant' Agata dei Goti, and Lacryma Christi, made with grapes grown on the slopes of Vesuvius.

== See also ==
Other regional cooking traditions in Italian cuisine:

- Cuisine of Abruzzo
- Apulian cuisine
- Arbëreshë cuisine
- Cuisine of Basilicata
- Emilian cuisine
- Cuisine of Liguria
- Lombard cuisine
- Cuisine of Mantua
- Piedmontese cuisine
- Roman cuisine
- Cuisine of Sardinia
- Sicilian cuisine
- Tuscan cuisine
- Venetian cuisine

== Sources ==
- Capatti, Alberto; Montanari, Massimo (2003) [1999 (in Italian)]. Italian Cuisine: A cultural history. Translated by O’Healy, Aine. Columbia University Press. ISBN 0-231-12232-2.
- Del Conte, Anna (2004) [2001]. The Concise Gastronomy of Italy. New York: Barnes and Nobles. p. 203. ISBN 0-7607-6344-5.
- Roden, Claudia (2003) [1989]. The Food of Italy. South Royalton, Vermont: Steerforth Press. ISBN 1-58642-062-3.
- Root, Waverley (1992) [1971]. The Food of Italy. New York: Vintage Books. ISBN 0-679-73896-7.
- Schwartz, Arthur (1998). Naples at Table: Cooking in Campania. New York: HarperCollins. ISBN 0-06-018261-X.
- Schwartz, Arthur (2009). The Southern Italian Table. New York: Clarkson Potter. ISBN 978-0-307-38134-7.
