= Death by Chocolate (disambiguation) =

Death by Chocolate is a dessert theme involving large amounts of chocolate.

Death by Chocolate may also refer to:

- Death by Chocolate (album), a 2001 album by De Phazz
- Death by Chocolate:The Last Word on a Consuming Passion, a 1992 dessert cookbook by Marcel Desaulniers
- "Death By Chocolate", an episode of the TV series Harvey Birdman, Attorney at Law
- "Death By Chocolate", a short story from Fearsome Tales for Fiendish Kids, and its adaptation episode of the same name from Grizzly Tales for Gruesome Kids
- Theobromine poisoning, also known as chocolate poisoning
- Death by Chocolate, a band on Jetset Records
- "Death by Chocolate", a song by Soccer Mommy from Collection
- "Death by Chocolate", a song by Sia from Some People Have Real Problems
