= Chocolate cake =

Baked cake flavored with chocolate

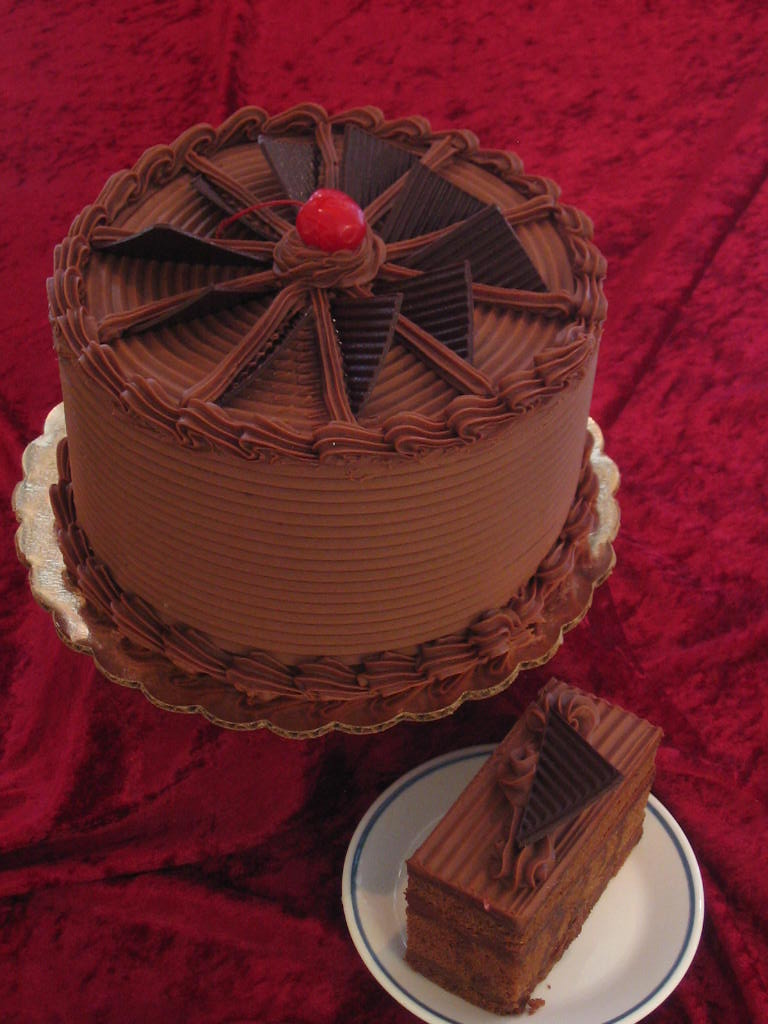
- Four-layer fudge cake with chocolate icing
- Type: Cake
- Main ingredients: Chocolate or cocoa powder

Chocolate cake or chocolate gâteau (from French: gâteau au chocolat) is a cake flavored with melted chocolate, cocoa powder, or both. It may also contain fudge, vanilla creme, and other sweeteners.

== History ==
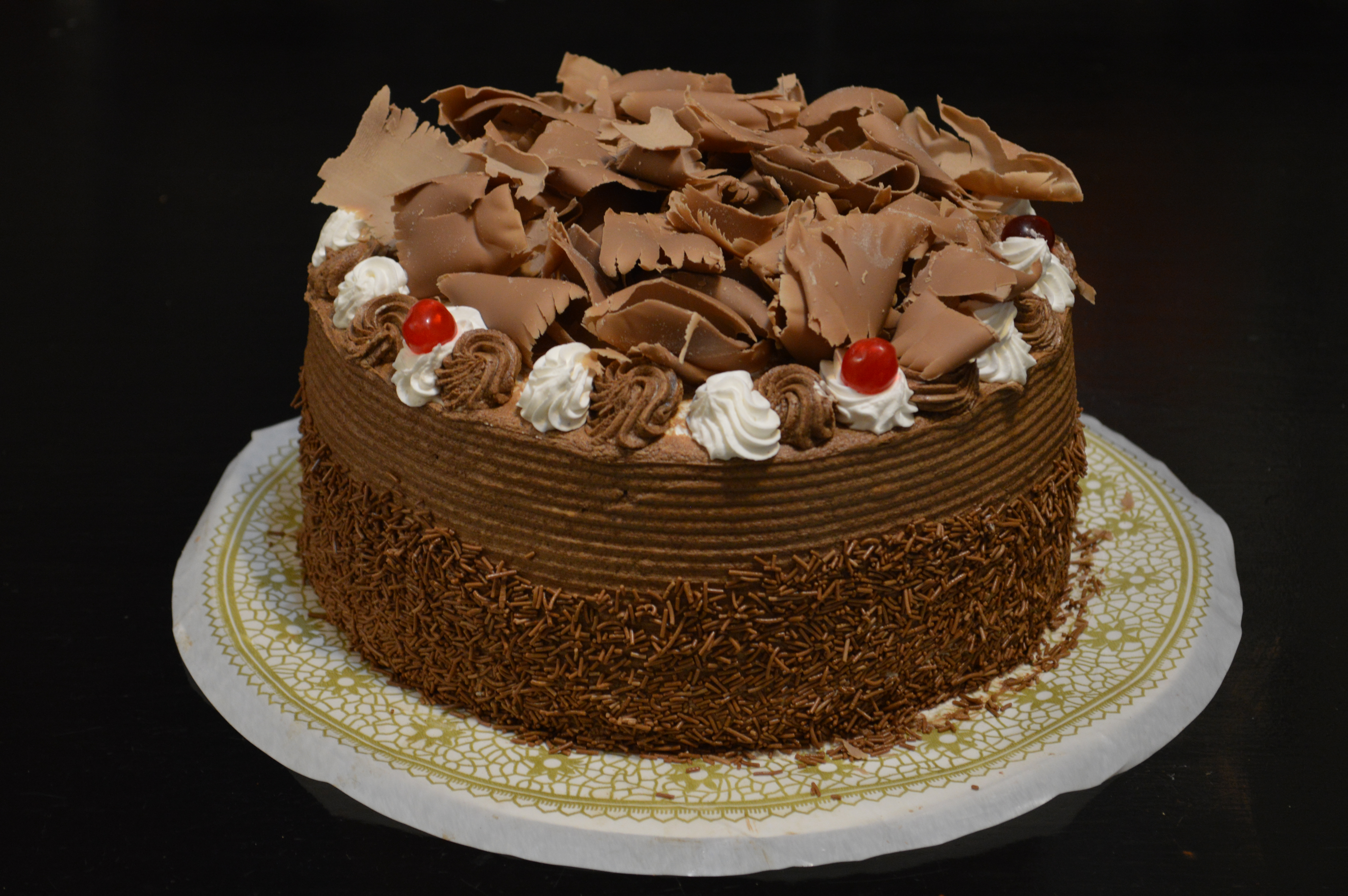
Double-layer chocolate truffle cake

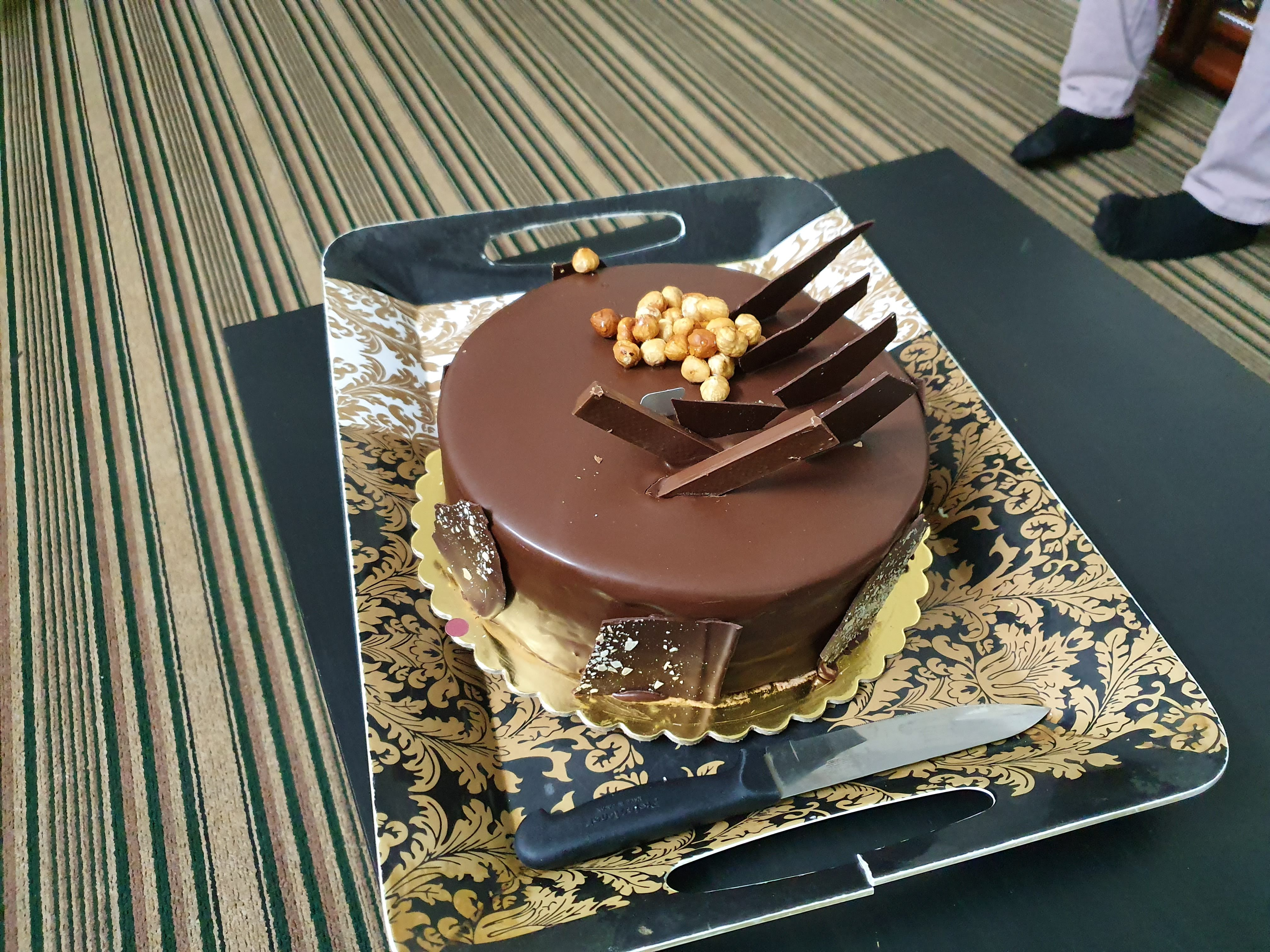
A brown chocolate cake

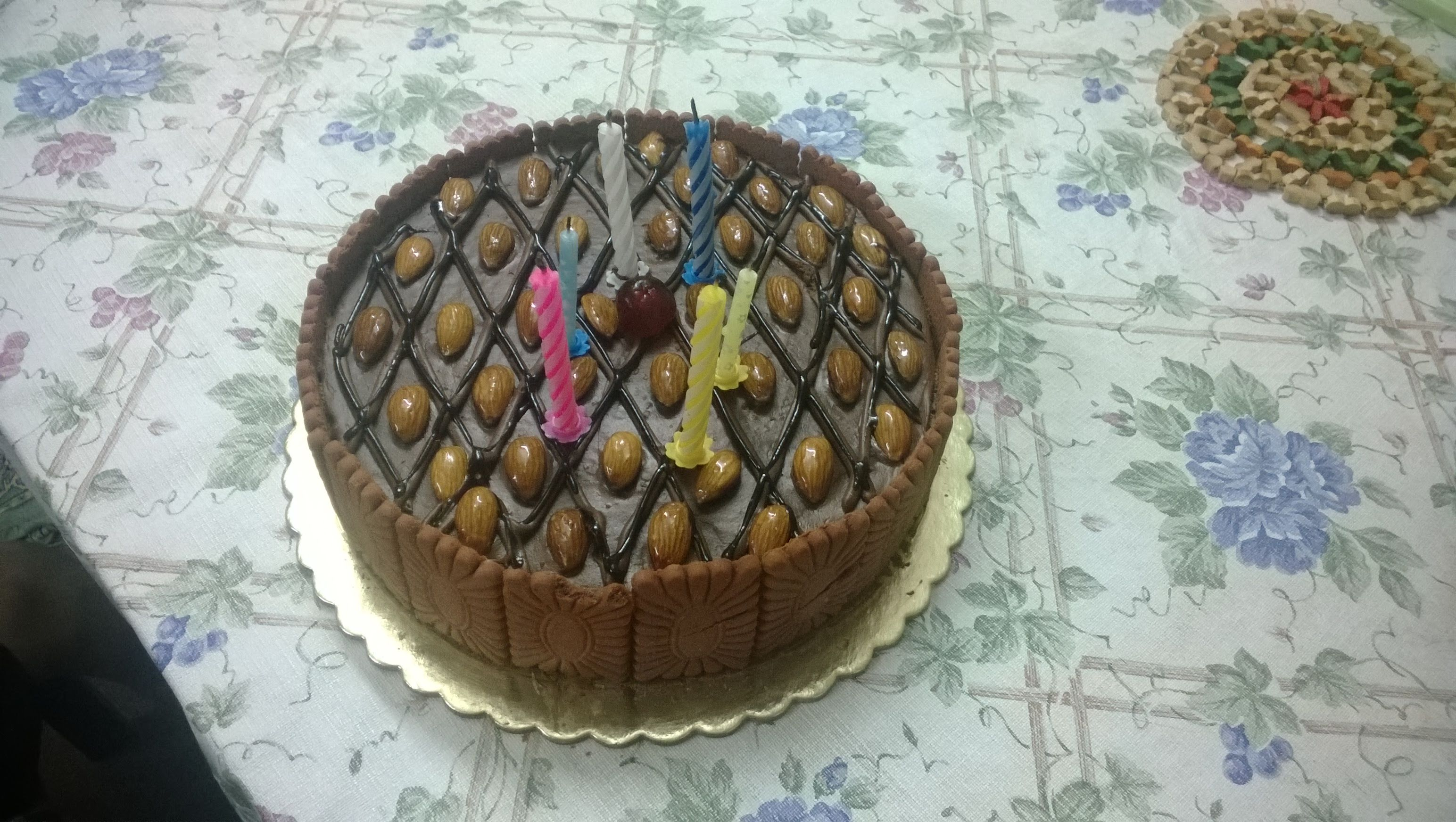
Black Chocolate cake with almonds and biscuits surrounding it

The history of chocolate cake goes back to the 17th century, when cocoa powder from the Americas was added to traditional cake recipes.

In 1828, Coenraad van Houten of the Netherlands developed a mechanical method for extracting the fat from cacao liquor, resulting in cacao butter and the partly defatted cacao, a compacted mass of solids that could be sold as "rock cacao" or ground into powder. The processes transformed chocolate from an exclusive luxury to an inexpensive daily snack.

A process for making silkier and smoother chocolate, called conching, was developed in Switzerland in 1879 by Rodolphe Lindt. This made it easier to bake with chocolate, as it amalgamates smoothly and completely with cake batters. Until the 1890s, chocolate recipes were mostly for chocolate drinks, and its presence in cakes was only in fillings and glazes.

Chocolate cakes were first introduced to Spain in the late 19th century, via Catalonia and the Basque Country. In 1886, American cooks began adding chocolate to the cake batter to make the first chocolate cakes in that country. The Duff Company of Pittsburgh, a molasses manufacturer, introduced "Devil's food" chocolate cake mixes in the mid-1930s, but production was put on hold during World War II. After the war, the Pillsbury company was in 1948 the first to sell a chocolate cake mix, and in 1951 the "Three Star Surprise" mix from Duncan Hines (so called because a white, yellow or chocolate cake could be made from the same mix) swept the market.

"Chocolate decadence" cakes were popular in the United States 1980s. In the 1990s, single-serving molten chocolate cakes with liquid chocolate centers and infused chocolates with exotic flavors such as tea, curry, red pepper, passion fruit, and champagne were popular. Chocolate lounges and artisanal chocolate makers were popular in the 2000s. Rich, all-but-flourless chocolate cakes are "now standard in the modern pâtisserie", according to Maricel Presilla's The New Taste of Chocolate in 2001.

== Cake types ==
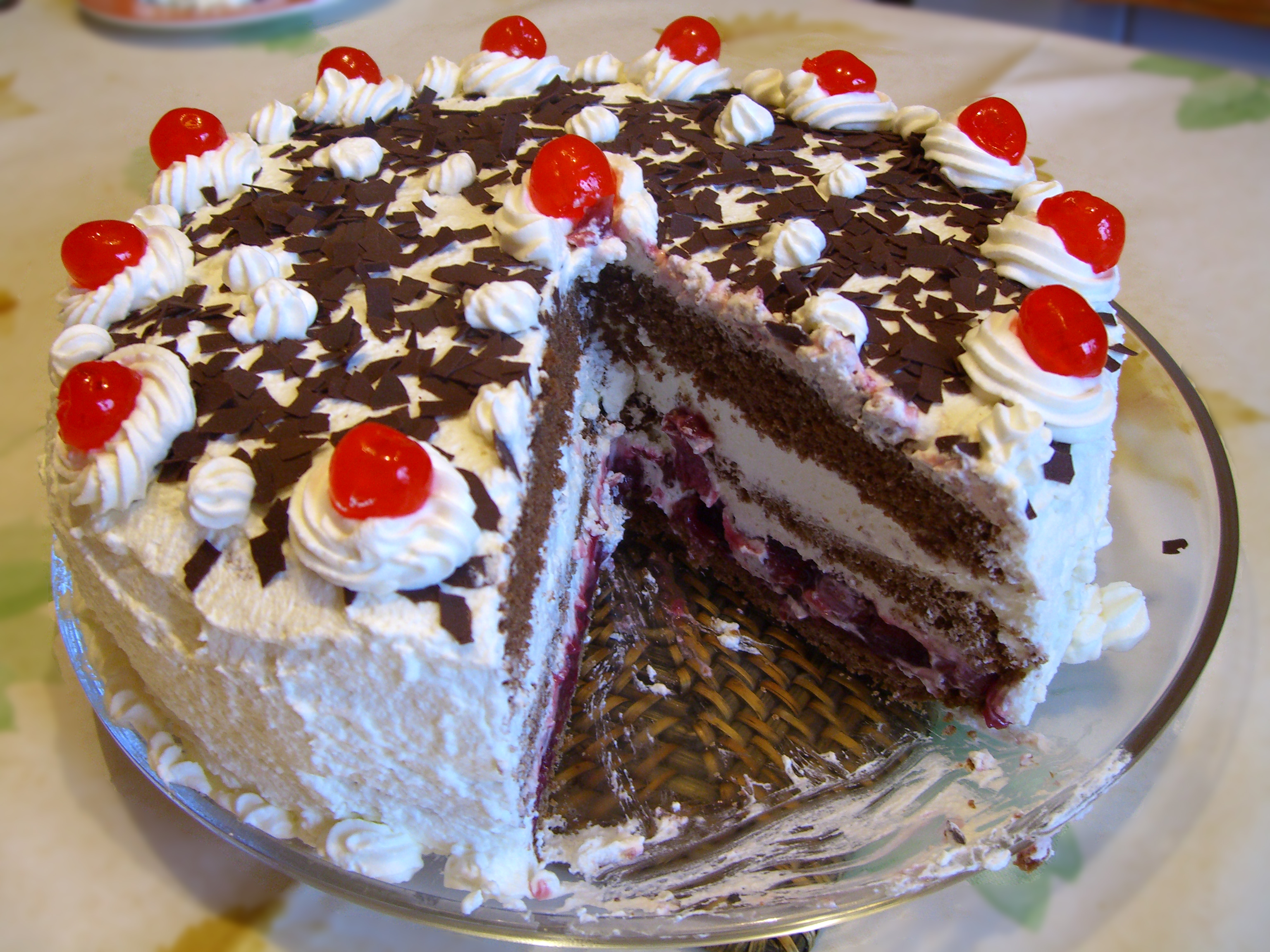
A four-layer Black Forest gateau

Popular variants on chocolate cake include chocolate fudge cake, which was made at Wellesley College in the early 20th century, inspired by the fudge that Wellesley students often cooked in their dorm rooms (despite the disapproval of the college administration). The cake was popularized by recipes for "Wellesley Fudge Cake" and "College Cake" advertised by Baker's Chocolate in the 1920s and later became nationally known, becoming one of the most popular chocolate cake varieties in New England in particular. In 1981, the recipe for Wellesley Fudge Cake was placed in a time capsule in Wellesley's library, meant to be opened in 100 years.

Fudge cake received another popularity boost in 1966 when Ella Rita Helfrich won second place in the Pillsbury Bake-Off with her "Tunnel of Fudge cake," a cake baked in a Bundt pan with a rich, molten center of chocolate and pecans. The cake became a popular hit and the most-requested cake in Pillsbury's history, leading to the national popularity of the Bundt pan. The original recipe can no longer be made because of its use of a since-discontinued Pillsbury product, Double-Dutch Fudge Buttercream frosting mix, but adapted versions of the recipe have been published.

=== Notable variants ===
- Bariloche cake – Layered chocolate cake filled with dulce de leche
- Black Forest gateau – Chocolate sponge cake with a cherry filling, often layered with whipped cream
- Blackout cake – Chocolate cake filled with chocolate pudding
- Chocolate soufflé – Cake made with whipped egg whites that make it light and airy
- Devil's food cake – Moist, airy, rich chocolate layer cake
- Ding Dong – Commercial cake made by Hostess Brands shaped like a hockey puck with a cream filling
- Flourless chocolate cake – Chocolate custard cake made with whipped eggs and without flour
- Garash cake – Bulgarian chocolate and walnut cake
- German chocolate cake – Layered chocolate cake named after Samuel German, typically topped with coconut and walnut
- Joffre cake – Chocolate buttermilk cake layered with ganache and frosted with chocolate buttercream
- Molten chocolate cake – also known as a lava cake, has a liquid chocolate core
- Red velvet cake – Reddish chocolate cake with cream cheese icing
- Sachertorte – Austrian chocolate cake invented by Franz Sacher with dense cake and a layer of apricot jam
- Chocolate Swiss roll – A sponge cake roll filled with jam, cream or icing, and its Christmas variant the Yule log

== See also ==
- List of cakes
