= Caprese =

Caprese may refer to:

== Adjective ==
- Something of or pertaining to Capri

== Places ==
- Caprese Michelangelo, a village in Tuscany

== Food ==
- Caprese salad, a salad of mozzarella cheese, tomatoes, and basil
- Torta caprese, a traditional Italian chocolate, and almond or walnut, cake
