= Death by Chocolate =

Various desserts that feature chocolate

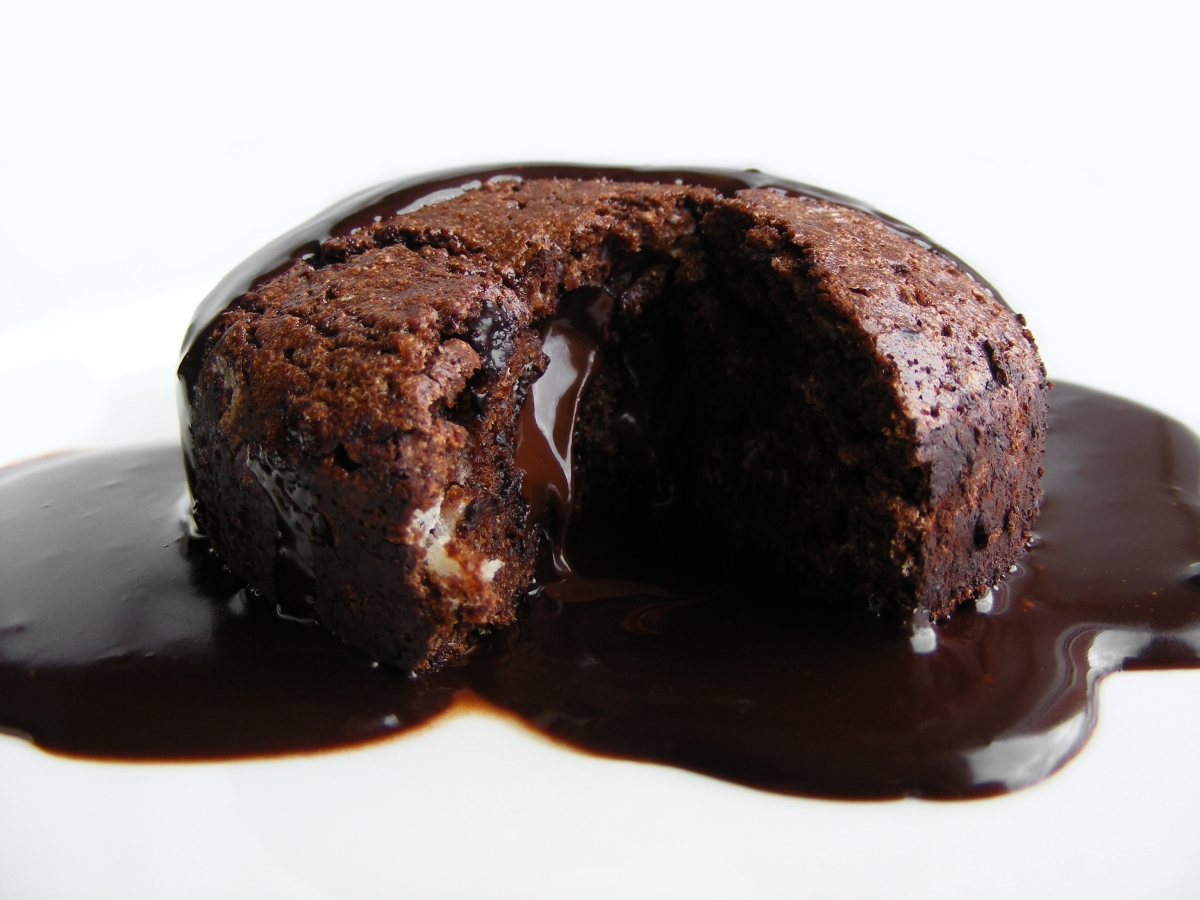
Lava cake has been described as a Death by Chocolate dish.

Death by Chocolate is a colloquial descriptive or marketing term for various cakes and desserts that feature chocolate, especially dark chocolate or cocoa as the primary ingredient. The phrase is trademarked in some countries, and the dessert is a signature dish of Bennigan's restaurants in the United States.

== Cakes ==
Some chocolate cakes and Devil's food cakes are called or have the moniker "Death by Chocolate cake", and some of these may be served with a chocolate sauce, such as lava cake. Ingredients used in Death by Chocolate cakes may include basic chocolate cake mix ingredients, chocolate pudding, chocolate chips, shaved or grated chocolate, whipped cream and powdered sugar.

== Trademarks ==
=== United States ===
Death by Chocolate aka Mort au Chocolat originated in 1981 at Les Anges restaurant in Santa Monica, California. It was the result of a collaboration between the restaurant's Creator/Proprietor, Jeff Fields and its Pastry Chef, Claude Koeberle, himself the son of a Maitre Ouvrier de France. Composed of multiple chocolate layers - genoise, meringue, ganache, butter cream, and mousse - it was sauced with chocolate creme anglaise.

The original "Death by Chocolate" cake debuted at the Trellis restaurant in Williamsburg, Virginia in 1982. It was created by the chef and owner of the Trellis, Marcel Desaulniers in collaboration with pastry chef Donald Mack. Desaulniers said that he got the name from an article in Gourmet (magazine) where a cake was named "mourir de chocolat," French for dying of chocolate. The recipe for baking Desaulnier's version was estimated to take three days of cooking owing to the complexity of the cake and the need to create each layered ingredient.

The trademark for "Death by Chocolate" in the United States is owned by Bennigan's IP LLC restaurants. The initial trademark application was filed by Bennigans on 2 July 2008, and the trademark is due to expire on 9 April 2026. Bennigan's also filed a U.S. trademark registration request for the Death by Chocolate Martini on 20 August 2002, which was registered on 5 August 2003.

The version of Death by Chocolate offered at Bennigan's consists of many ingredients, including two types of ice cream combined with Twix candy bars, which is dipped in a chocolate sauce and served atop crumbed chocolate cookie crust. The dish is accompanied with a side dish of a heated chocolate topping.

Bennigan's also purveyed a Martini cocktail named the Death by Chocolate Martini, which was a Martini prepared with the addition of chocolate liqueurs.

=== Other regions ===
In the United Kingdom and European Union, the registered trade mark rights belong to F.T. Wood & Sons Limited.

== Events ==
Various Death by Chocolate-themed and -named events have occurred, such as fundraisers and charity events that involve the consumption of chocolate-based desserts, dishes and beverages. Dishes served at Death by Chocolate events have included savory dishes prepared with chocolate, chocolate candy, desserts, brownies, cookies, cakes, cocktails, Martinis and beer, and the events have included chocolatiers.

== See also ==
- Chocoholic
- List of desserts
- List of chocolate beverages
