= Blackout cake =

Chocolate cake filled with pudding

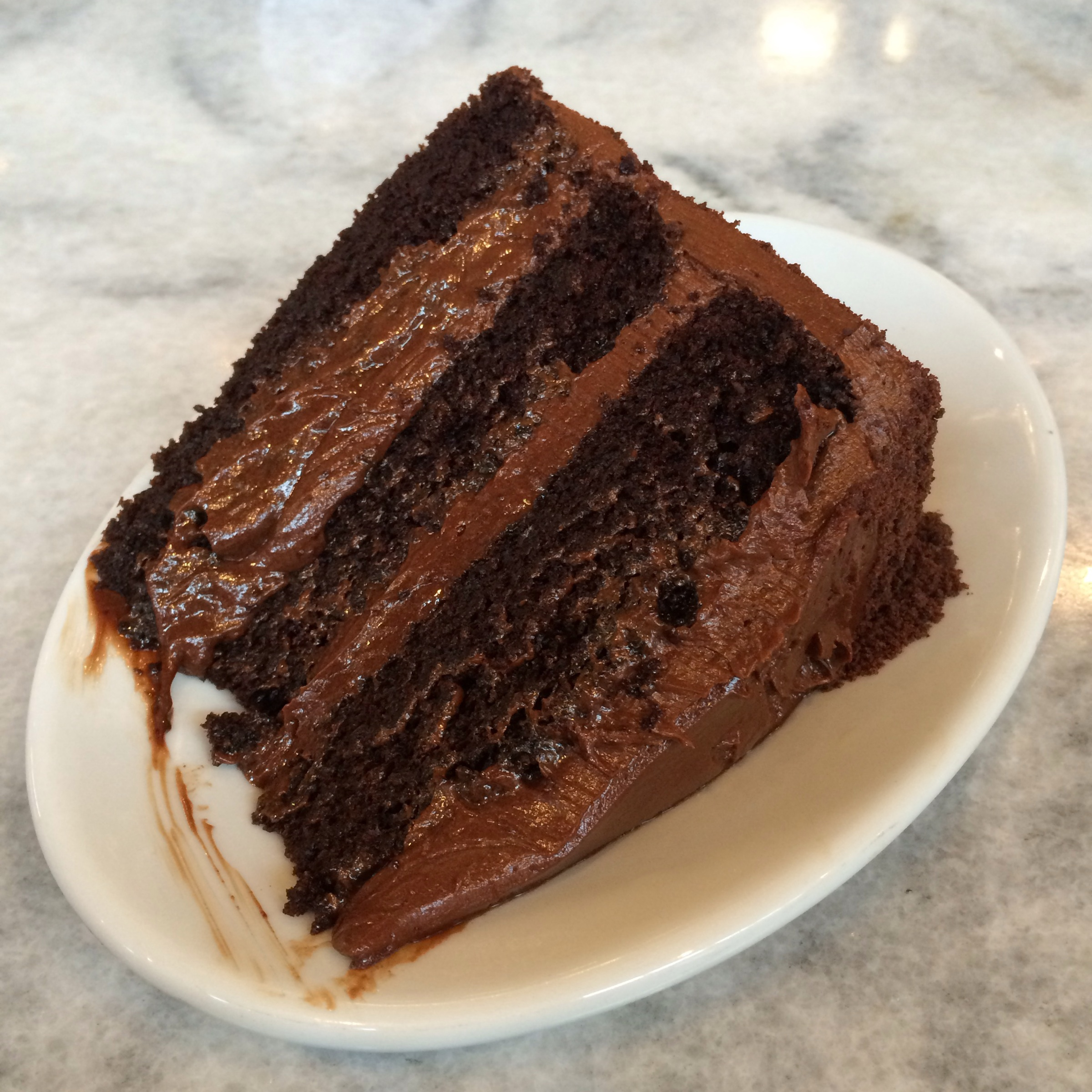
- Blackout cake
- Type: Cake
- Course: Dessert
- Place of origin: United States
- Region or state: Brooklyn
- Created by: Ebinger's Bakery
- Invented: 1942

Blackout cake, sometimes called Brooklyn Blackout cake, is a chocolate cake filled with chocolate pudding and topped with chocolate cake crumbs. It was invented during World War II by a Brooklyn bakery chain named Ebinger's, in recognition of the mandatory blackouts to protect the Brooklyn Navy Yard.

After the war, the name persisted for a very dark chocolate cake and became common across the American Midwest. Ebinger's variety was very popular and became a signature offering, popular with Brooklyn residents, until the chain of more than fifty locations closed on April 2, 1972.

== See also ==
- List of desserts
