= Flourless chocolate cake =

Chocolate custard cake

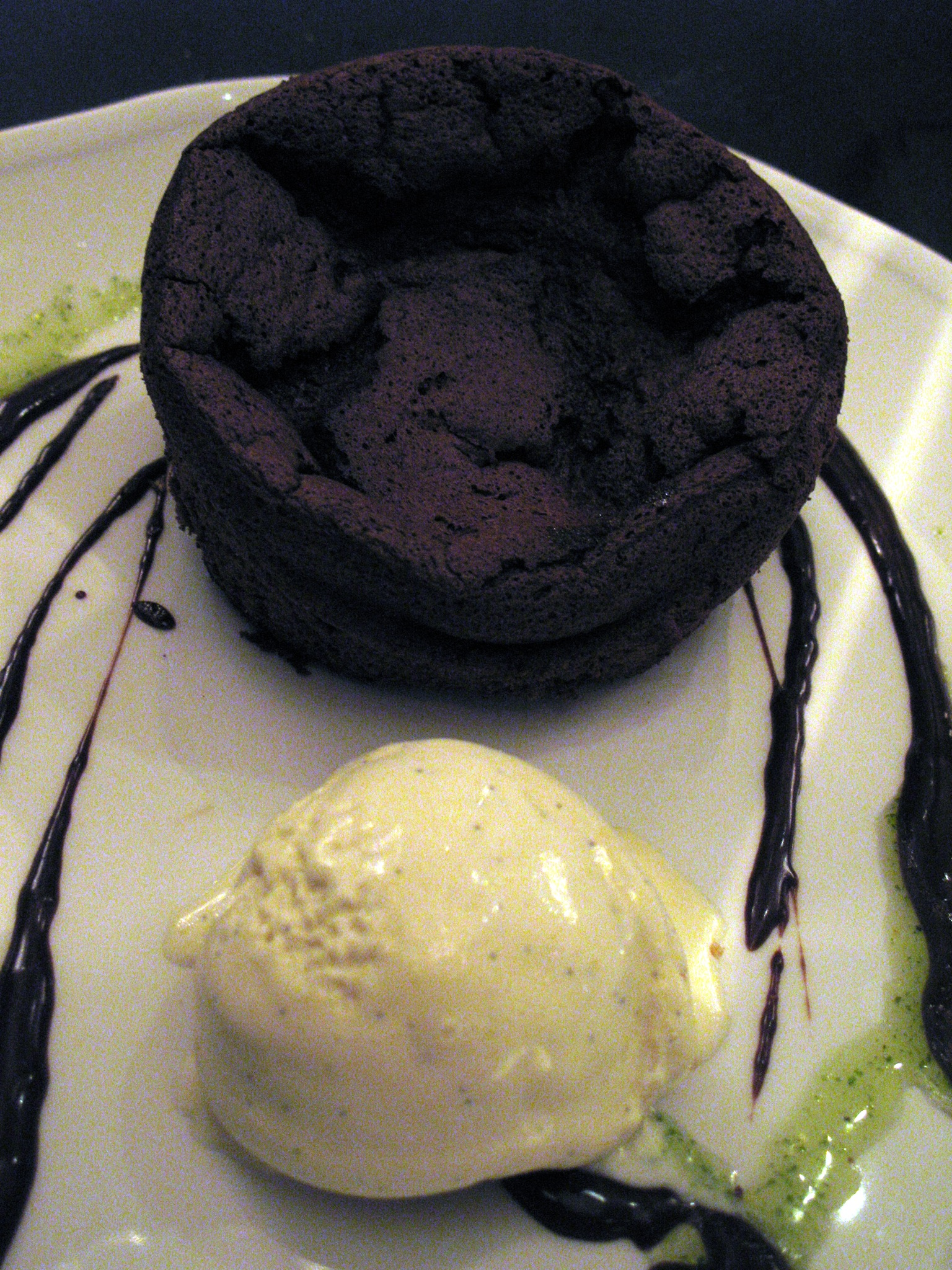
- Flourless chocolate cake with vanilla ice cream
- Type: Cake
- Course: Dessert
- Place of origin: Italy

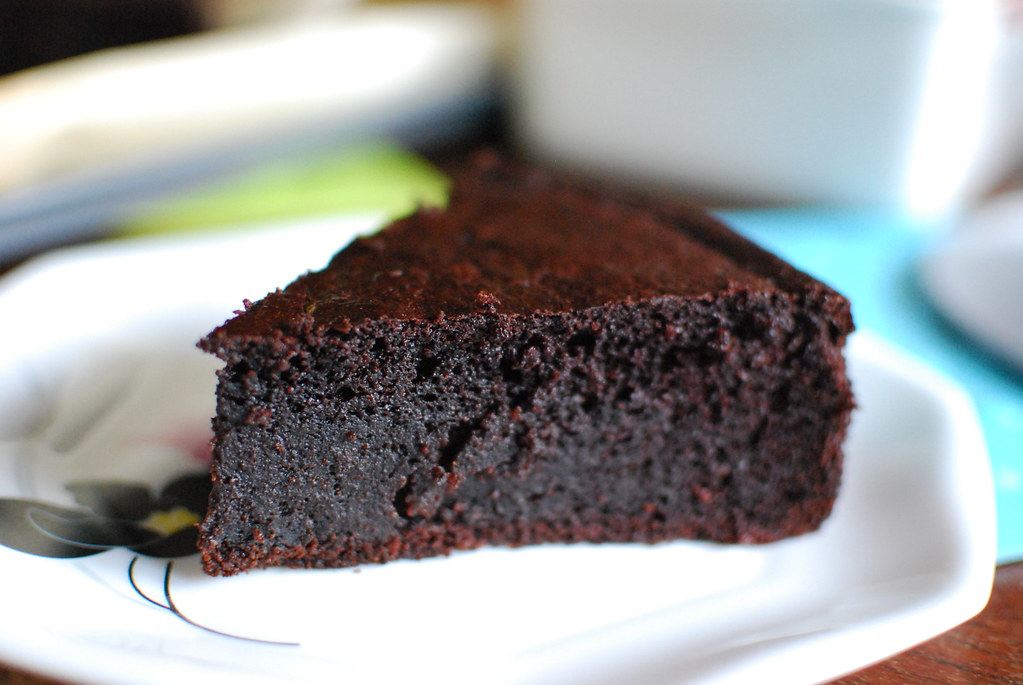
Quinoa chocolate cake

Flourless chocolate cake is a dense cake made from an aerated chocolate mixture. The first documented form of the cake, La Torta Tenerina was seen in Ferrara, Italy, though some forms of the cake have myths surrounding their origins. The dessert contains no gluten, which makes it acceptable for those with celiac disease, gluten-free diets, and during religious holidays in which gluten and grains are not permitted.

== Overview ==
A traditional baking method for a variety of flourless chocolate cakes involves whipping the whites alone and then whipping the yolks into the sugar to increase the air content. The overall effect of this process is a sturdy, but light cake. The chocolate and butter are melted together in either a microwave or a bain‑marie. Once all the ingredients are combined, the resulting mixture contains only the starch naturally present in the chocolate. The use of Dutch cocoa powder instead of simple cocoa powder will allow the cake to have a denser fudge-like consistency that the cake is known for. Flourless chocolate cakes typically use simple ingredients including: chocolate, butter, eggs, sugar, cocoa powder, vanilla, salt, and an optional dusting of powdered sugar, chocolate ganache, or berries. The Torta Caprese includes an additional ingredient of an almond meal.

== Origin ==
La Torta Tenerina is an Italian flourless chocolate cake that was first seen in Ferrara, Italy in 1900. It is the first recorded version of the cake. It has an alternative name, Queen of Montenegro, as it was said to be served when King Victor Emmanuel III took the throne of Italy making Elena Montenegro the Queen of Italy. In Ferrara, Italy La Torta Tenerina can be found on many restaurant and bakery menus.

== Special diets ==
=== In Jewish cuisine ===
Flourless chocolate cake is a common dessert among Jews during the holiday of Passover since leavened grains cannot be consumed during that holiday.

=== In gluten-free diets ===
Flourless chocolate cake is a popular dessert in gluten-free diets. There are several varieties including topping the cake with a chocolate ganache, adding raspberries, or it is frequently served with vanilla ice cream, all of which can be enjoyed by those with gluten-free and celiac-appropriate diets.

== Versions and similar cakes ==
Torta Caprese, originating from the Italian island of Capri, is a traditional flourless chocolate cake popular in that region that includes almond flour. This cake has a number of myths surrounding its origins including a baker forgetting to add the flour and that it's a version of an Austrian cake called the Austrian Sachertorte. A similar cake with little or no flour is known as "fallen" or "molten" chocolate cake and was popularized by, among others, Jean-Georges Vongerichten's restaurants.

The River Café's "chocolate nemesis" is a version of a flourless chocolate cake, with only four ingredients, eggs, sugar, chocolate and butter.

== See also ==
- Chocolate mousse
- Cheesecake
- Torte
- List of custard desserts
- List of desserts
