= Ebinger's =

Bakery in Brooklyn, New York

Ebinger's was a bakery in Brooklyn, New York that invented Blackout cake. The original location was opened by George and Catherine Ebinger in 1898, on Flatbush Avenue near Cortelyou Road. Contemporaries included other German bakeries such as Drake's and Entenmann's.

They ended up having more than 50 outlets in Queens and Nassau County as well as Brooklyn but as their customer base left New York City for the suburbs, they ended up declaring bankruptcy in 1972. By the time they closed for good on August 26, 1972, they had 54 outlets.

== Boycott ==
In the 1960s, there was an organized boycott of their products because they would only hire white women to work in their bakeries.
