= Sfogliatella =

Italian filled pastry

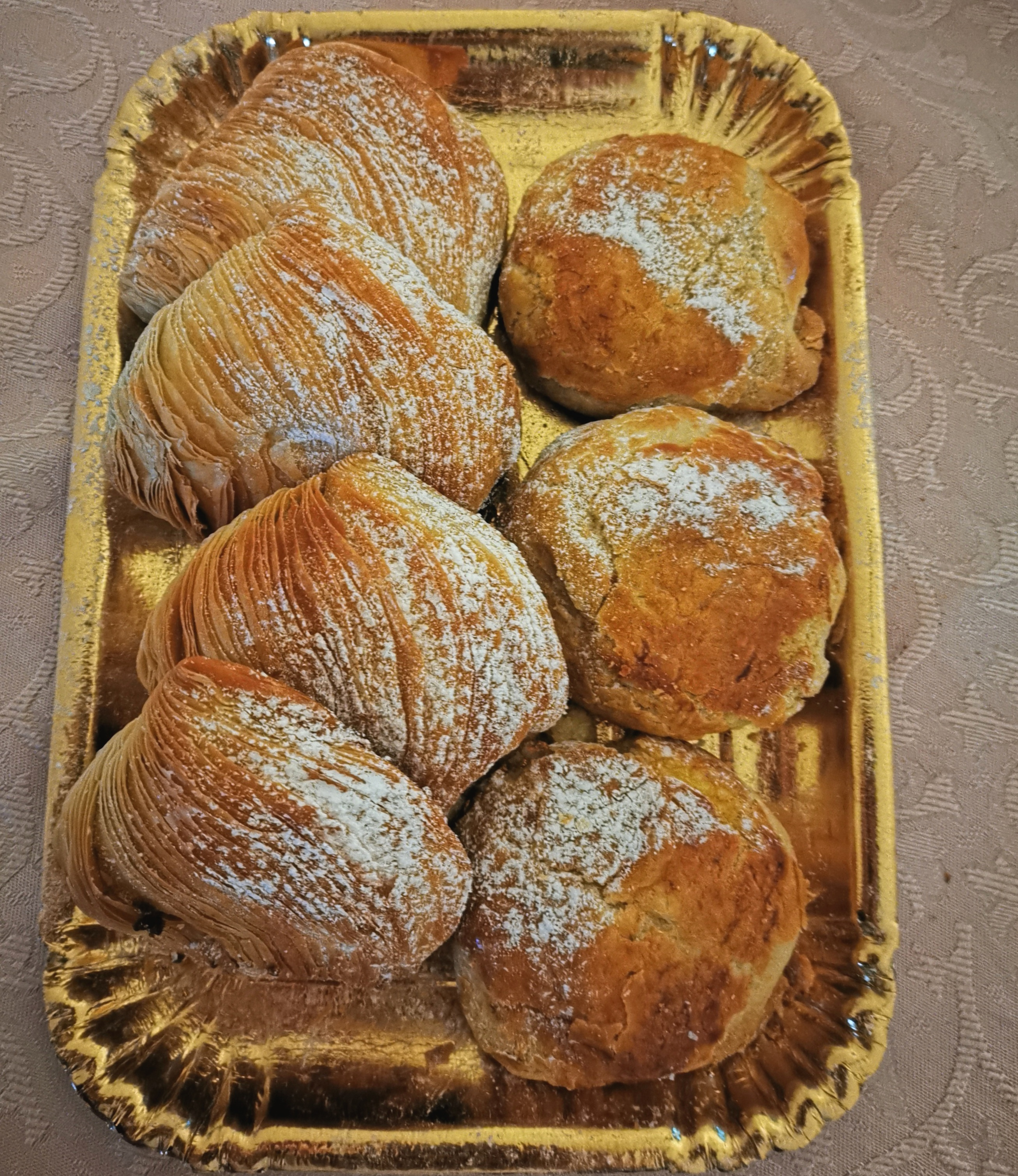
- Sfogliatelle ricce (left) and frolle (right)
- Alternative names: Sfogliate (in Naples)
- Type: Pastry
- Place of origin: Italy
- Region or state: Campania
- Main ingredients: Pastry dough
- Variations: Many types of fillings

Sfogliatella (Italian: [sfoʎʎaˈtɛlla]; pl.: sfogliatelle) is a shell-shaped pastry with a sweet or creamy filling, originating in the Campania region of Italy — its name deriving from the Italian diminutive of "thin leaves" or "layers."

Sfogliatella Santa Rosa, from which the current sfogliatella was born, was created in the monastery of Santa Rosa in Conca dei Marini, Campania, in the 17th century. Pasquale Pintauro, a pastry chef from Naples, acquired the original recipe and began selling the pastries in his shop in 1818.

In Neapolitan cuisine, there are two types of the pastry: sfogliatella riccia ('curly'), the standard version, and sfogliatella frolla, a less labour-intensive pastry that uses a shortcrust dough and does not form the sfogliatella's characteristic layers, which are produced through repeated rolling and folding of dough. Neither are frequently made at home, instead being generally purchased from a pasticceria.

A variation named coda d'aragosta (in the United States called a lobstertail) also exists, with the same crust but a sweeter filling.

== Gallery ==
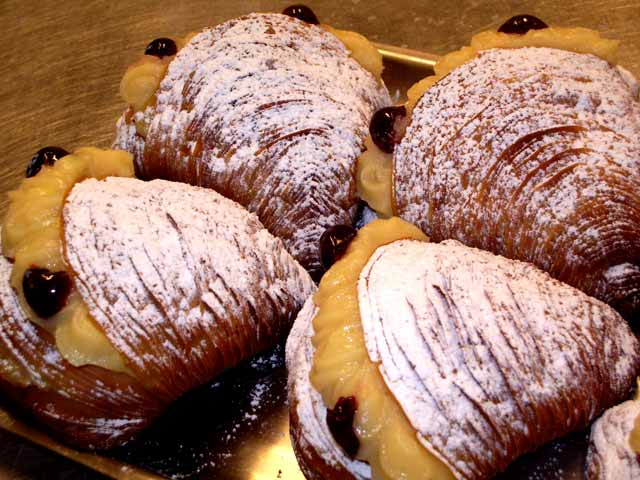
Sfogliatelle Santa Rosa

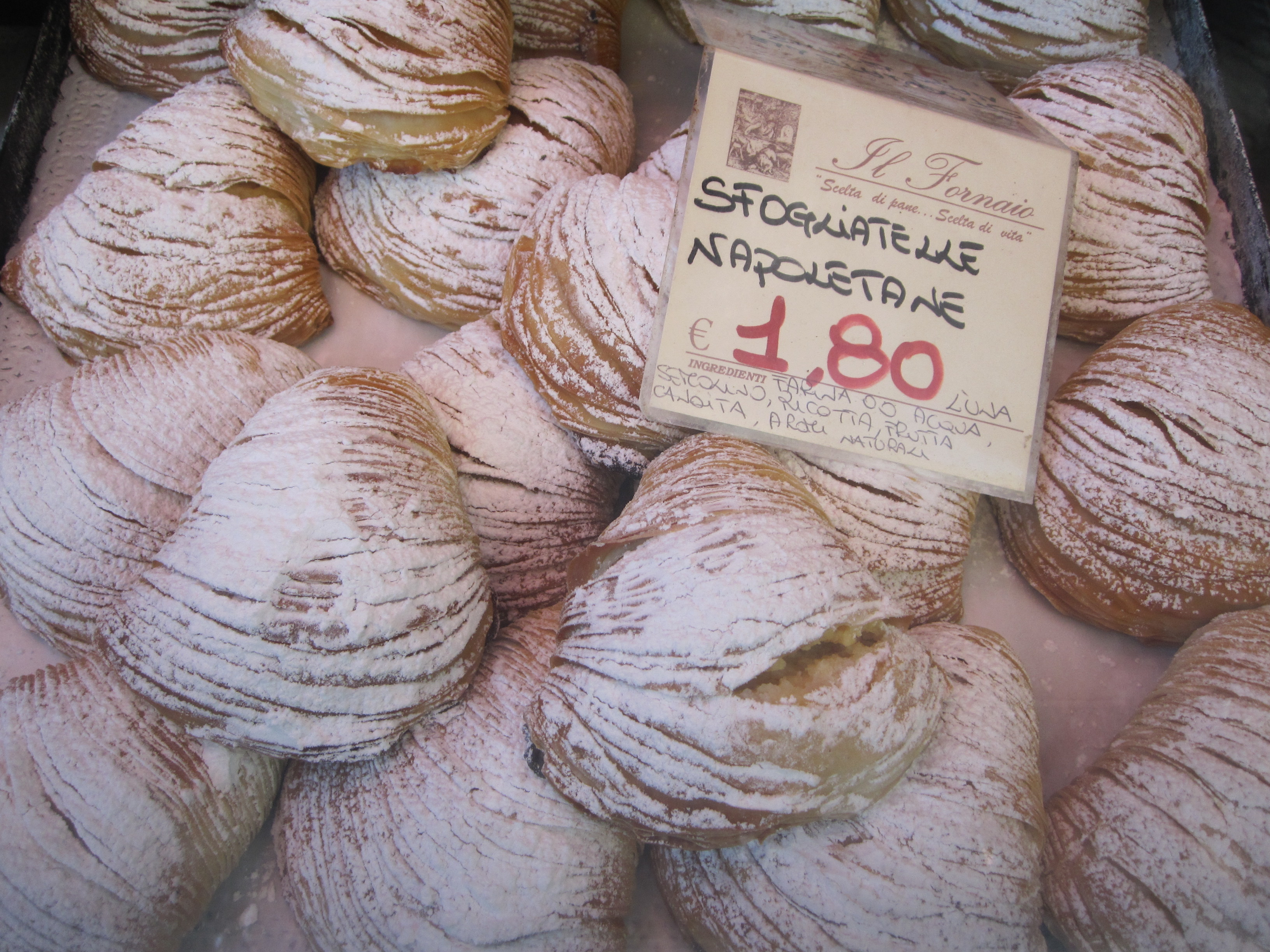
On sale in Rome

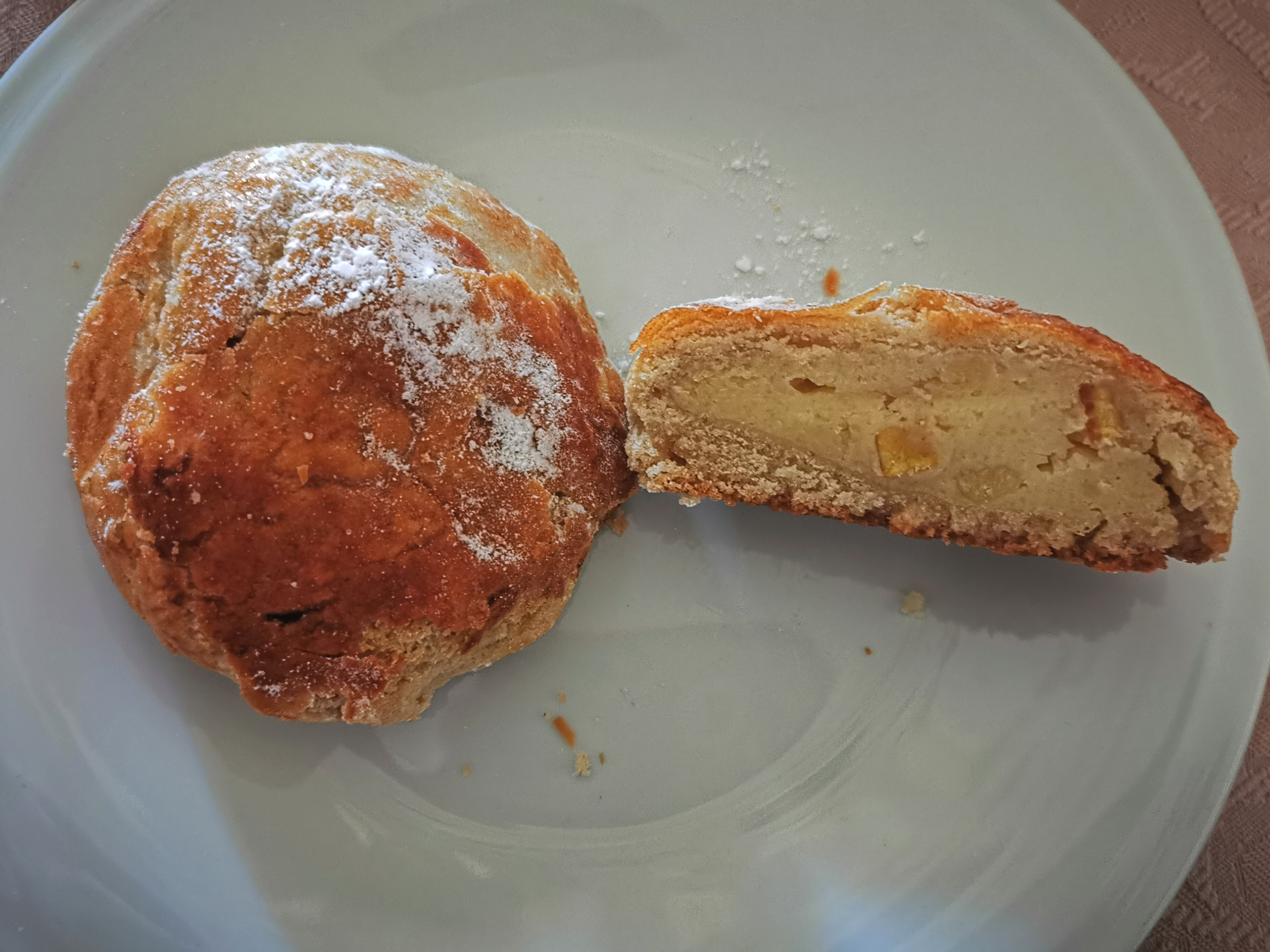
Whole and interior

== See also ==
Media related to Sfogliatelle at Wikimedia Commons

- List of Italian desserts and pastries
