= Bariloche cake =

Argentine layer cake

Torta Bariloche
- Type: Cake
- Course: Dessert
- Place of origin: Argentina
- Region or state: Patagonia
- Main ingredients: Chocolate, dulce de leche, Bariloche cream
- Ingredients generally used: Whipped cream, cherries, nuts

Bariloche cake is an Argentine layer cake made out mainly of chocolate and dulce de leche. It is named after the city of San Carlos de Bariloche, Río Negro Province.

== History ==
The Bariloche cake originated in Argentine Patagonia, where the influence of European immigrants, especially Germans and Swiss, fused with local tradition, creating a recipe that combines the sweetness of chocolate and dulce de leche. Although there is no single creator or specific date of origin for this particular cake, it is considered an icon of Patagonian pastry, evoking the region's climate and flavors.

Its recipe may also include cherries, nuts, whipped cream or Bariloche cream.

== See also ==
- List of Argentine sweets and desserts
