= Marcel Desaulniers =

American chef

- Born: August 2, 1945; Woonsocket, Rhode Island, United States
- Died: May 28, 2024 (aged 78); Williamsburg, Virginia, United States
- Education: Culinary Institute of America
- Culinary career
- Cooking style: American, Slow Food, Chocolate
- Previous restaurants
- The Trellis, Williamsburg, Virginia (1980 – 2010); Mad about Chocolate, Williamsburg, Virginia (2012 – 2018)
- Television shows
- The Burgermeisters, Death by Chocolate

Marcel Desaulniers (August 2, 1945 - May 28, 2024) was an American chef, restaurant owner, cookbook author, director Emeritus of the Culinary Institute of America, and self-described "Guru of Ganache". He is the author of the 1992 book Death by Chocolate.

== Personal life ==
Desaulniers was born in Woonsocket, Rhode Island, and resided in Williamsburg, VA with his wife Connie, an artist. He graduated from Mount Saint Charles Academy in 1963, and from the Culinary Institute of America in 1965. He served in the United States Marine Corps and was a Vietnam veteran.

His daughter, Danielle Desaulniers, a respected sommelier and restaurant consultant, also trained at the Culinary Institute of America. She has worked at San Francisco's One Market Restaurant, New York City's Restaurant Daniel, Café Boulud, Ducasse, and Del Frisco's Double Eagle Steak House.

== Professional life ==
=== Businesses ===
In 1980 Desaulniers, along with his business partner, John Curtis, opened The Trellis restaurant in Colonial Williamsburg's Merchants Square. In 1997, he opened an 'experimental' food and art studio in Williamsburg called Ganache Hill. He and his partner sold The Trellis to chef David Everett, proprietor of the Blue Talon Bistro, after 29 years of operation. In 1995, the restaurant was inducted into the 'Nation's Restaurant News' Fine Dining Hall of Fame. In 2012, Desaulniers and his wife opened MAD About Chocolate (www.madaboutchocolate.us). It offered sweet and savory treats, including cookies, cakes, and ice cream, and served as a gallery for Connie's art. The couple sold the business in February 2016.

=== Television ===
He hosted several television cooking shows including "The Burgermeister" and "Death by Chocolate" and has appeared on Julia Child's television show, Baking with Julia and on PBS' cooking shows Cook-off America and Grilling Maestros.

=== Cookbooks ===
Desaulniers wrote 10 cooking books including Death by Chocolate (1992). His concentration on chocolate cuisine and his fondness for chocolate ganache earned him the sobriquet "Guru of Ganache."

== Awards and honors ==
- Ivy Award: The Trellis, Restaurants and Institutions Magazine, 1989
- Best Chef: Mid-Atlantic, James Beard Foundation, 1993
- Best Pastry Chef: Mid-Atlantic James Beard Foundation
- Best Dessert Book, James Beard Foundation, 1993
- Best Single Subject Cookbook: The Burger Meisters, James Beard Foundation, 1995
- Lifetime Achievement Award, Culinary Institute of America, 1996
- Outstanding Pasty Chef, James Beard Foundation, 1999
- Honor Roll of American Chefs, Food & Wine Magazine

== Bibliography ==
- Desaulniers, Marcel (2003) [1992]. Death by Chocolate: The Last Word on a Consuming Passion. Rizzoli. ISBN 0-8478-1564-1.
- Desaulniers, Marcel (1992). Trellis Cookbook: Expanded Edition. Simon & Schuster. ISBN 0-671-74842-4.
- Desaulniers, Marcel (1994). Burger Meisters. Simon & Schuster. ISBN 0-671-86538-2.
- Desaulniers, Marcel (1995). Desserts to Die for. Simon & Schuster. ISBN 0-684-81139-1.
- Desaulniers, Marcel (1996). An Alphabet of Sweets. Rizzoli. ISBN 0-8478-1981-7.
- Desaulniers, Marcel (1997). Death by Chocolate Cookies. Simon & Schuster. ISBN 0-684-83197-X.
- Desaulniers, Marcel (1998). Salad Days: Main Course Salads for a First Class Meal. Simon & Schuster Editions. ISBN 0-684-82261-X.
- Desaulniers, Marcel (1999). Grilling Maestros: Recipes from the Public Television Series. Marjorie Poore Productions. ISBN 0-9651095-5-0.
- Desaulniers, Marcel; Brett Bailey; Kelly Bailey (2000). Death by Chocolate Cakes: an Astonishing Array of chocolate enchantment. photography by Duane Winfield. Harper Collins. ISBN 0-688-16297-5.
- Desaulniers, Marcel (2002). Celebrate with Chocolate: totally over-the-top recipes. Harper Collins. ISBN 0-688-16298-3.
- Desaulniers, Marcel (2007). I'm Dreaming of a Chocolate Christmas. ISBN 978-0-7645-9900-2.
- Desaulniers, Marcel (1988). The Trellis Cookbook. ISBN 1-55584-114-7.
