= Strega (liqueur) =

Italian herbal liqueur

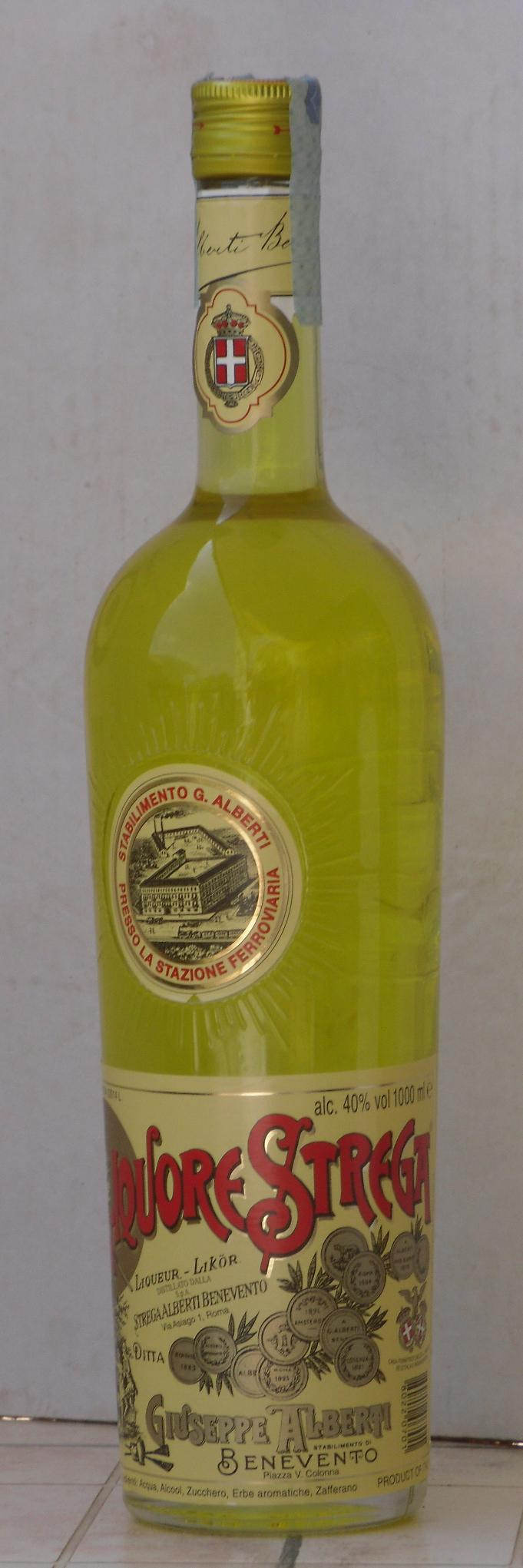
A bottle of Strega

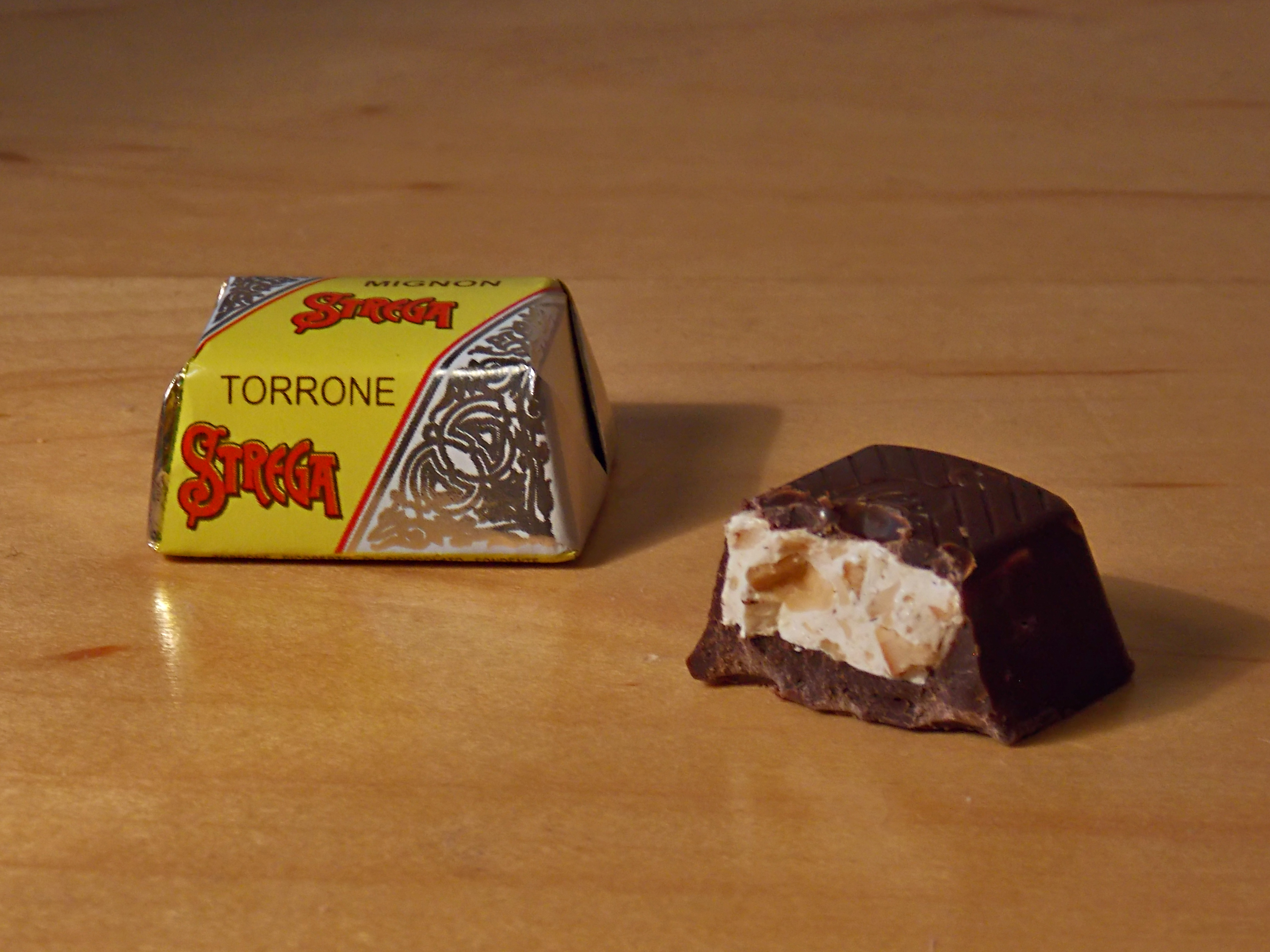
A torroncino with Strega, produced by Alberti

Liquore Strega is an Italian herbal liqueur produced since 1860 by the Strega Alberti Benevento S.p.A. in Benevento, Italy. Its distinctive yellow color comes from the presence of saffron. Strega is bottled at 80 proof (40% alc/vol), which is an alcohol content comparable to most hard liquors, but it has a sweetness and viscosity typical of liqueurs. Among its approximately 70 herbal ingredients are mint and fennel, giving it a complex flavor with minty and coniferous notes.

Strega is considered a digestif. It is used for flavoring torta caprese, a type of cake.

== History ==
Strega was developed in 1860 by the father–son team of Carmine Vincenzo Alberti and Giuseppe Alberti. The company experienced growth until Giuseppe Alberti's death in 1894. Alberti's four sons Ugo, Vincenzo, Francesco and Luigi took control. The company received a royal warrant of appointment to the Italian King.

Strega became well known for its colourful and artistic advertising. One poster was designed in 1906 by Alberto Choppuis in the art nouveau style. Strega is the Italian word for "witch" and legends of witchcraft at Benevento date back to the time of the Lombard invasion.

== Strega Prize ==
The Premio Strega (lit. 'Strega Prize') is the most important Italian literary award. It was founded in 1947 by Guido Alberti, then owner of the company, together with his friends, the writer Maria Bellonci and her husband Goffredo. Its origins lie with a group of post-World War II Italian writers, intellectuals and artists known as the "Sunday Friends" ("Amici della Domenica"). Goffredo and Maria Bellonci hosted the Sunday Friends at their home with the intention of stimulating an active debate in Italian cultural life. In 1947, Bellonci set up a literary prize for the best work of prose fiction, to be decided upon by the votes of the Sunday Friends. The name of the Prize came from the company that produces Strega liqueur, which offered the money for the prize.

== Awards ==
The San Francisco World Spirits Competition, one of several international spirit ratings organizations, has evaluated Strega liqueur on three occasions since 2005. The ratings organization gave the spirit gold medals in 2005 and 2011 and a silver medal in 2008.
