= Molten chocolate cake =

Dessert

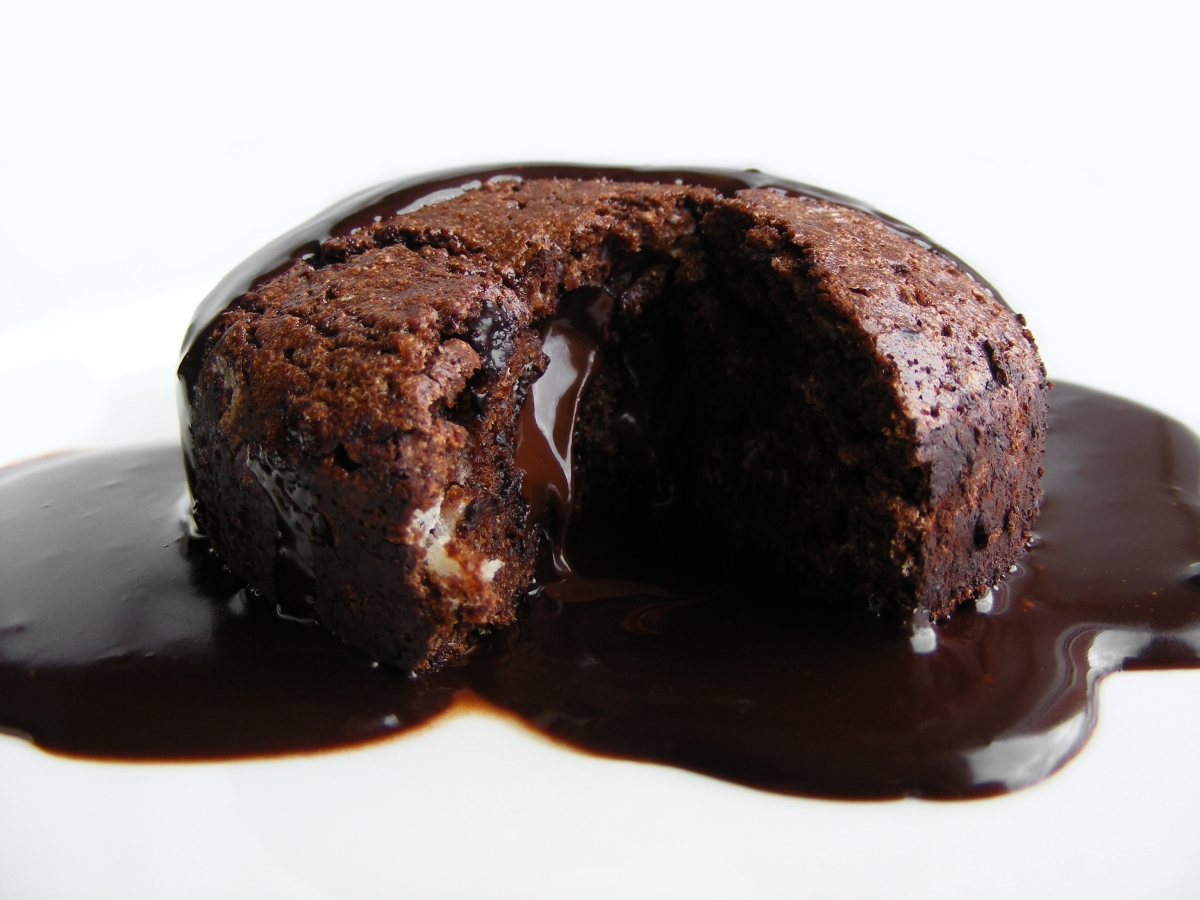
- Alternative names: mi-cuit au chocolat, Lava cake, chocolate lava cake, molten chocolate lava cake and, volcano cake
- Course: Dessert
- Place of origin: France
- Main ingredients: Butter, eggs, sugar, chocolate

Molten chocolate cake or runny core cake, is a French dessert that consists of a chocolate cake with a liquid chocolate core. It is named for its molten center, and it is also known as mi-cuit au chocolat, chocolat coulant ("flowing"), chocolate lava cake, chocolate fondant, or simply lava cake. It should not be confused with fondant au chocolat, a recipe that contains little flour, but much chocolate and butter, hence melting on the palate (but not on the plate).

== History ==
French chef Michel Bras said that he invented the cake in 1981, after two years of experimentation, with his original inspiration being a family group warming themselves up after a skiing trip by drinking hot chocolate. French chef and chocolatier Jacques Torres confirmed that such a dessert existed in France in the 1980s.

French chef Jean-Georges Vongerichten said he invented the dish in New York City in 1987. He recalled pulling a chocolate sponge cake from the oven before it was done and finding that the center was still runny, but warm with both a good taste and texture. He has been credited with popularizing the molten chocolate cake in the United States, where it became an almost de rigueur inclusion on high-end restaurant dessert menus in the 1990s.

The two recipes are not at all similar, even though the resulting dish is. Bras's recipe is made in two parts: a frozen ganache core, covered by a rice starch dough, and baked in a mold. Vongerichten's recipe is simpler: a chocolate cake batter made from normal flour, baked briefly in a very hot oven. The flowing chocolate center is therefore arrived at differently in the two recipes, but Vongerichten's has proved more popular, being easier to reproduce.

== Preparation ==
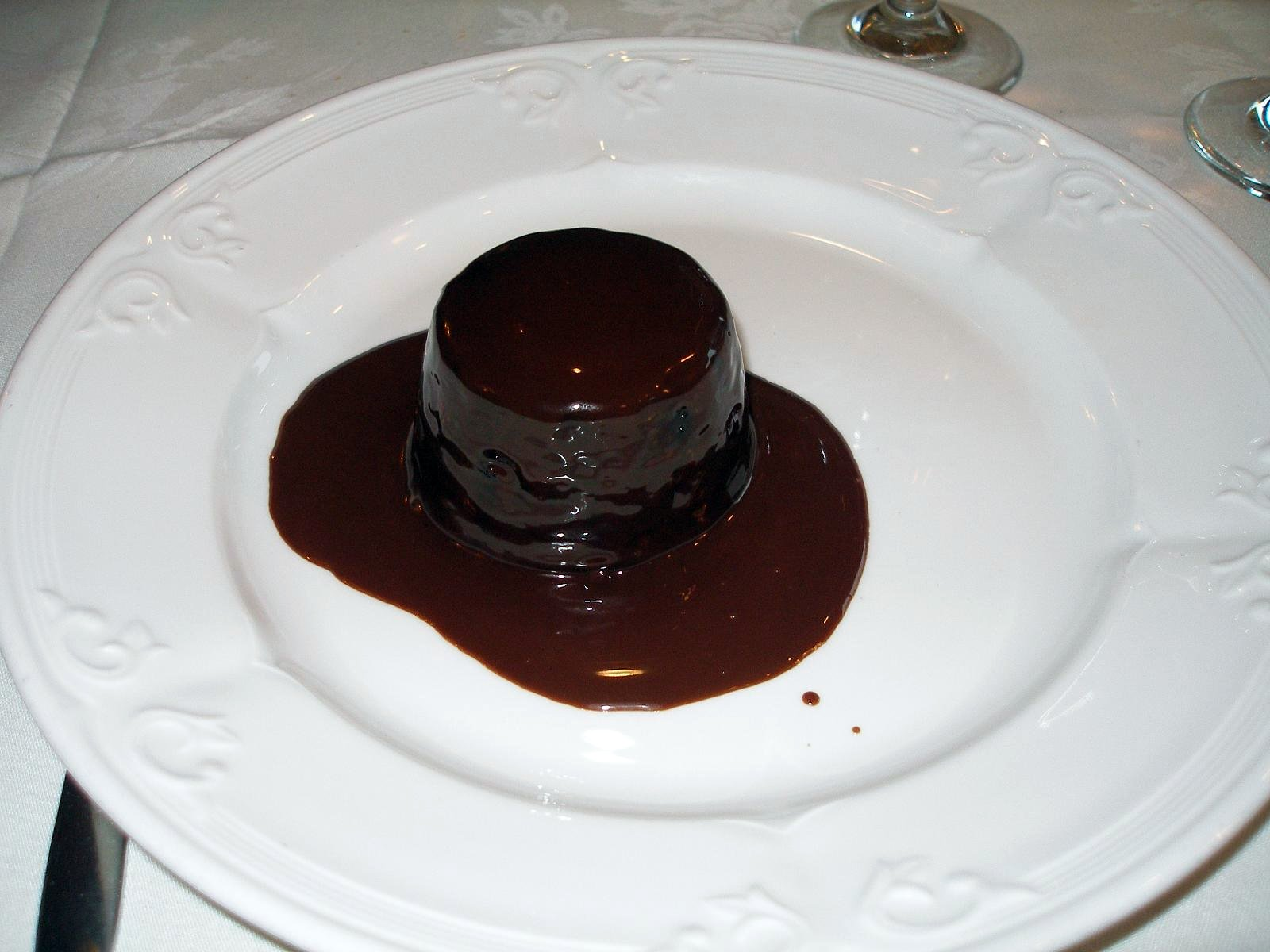
Chocolate lava cake smothered in chocolate sauce

Molten chocolate cakes characteristically contain five ingredients: butter, eggs, sugar, chocolate, and flour. The butter and chocolate are melted together, while the eggs are either whisked with the sugar to form a thick paste, producing a denser pastry, or separated, with the white whipped into a meringue to provide more lift and a lighter result. A tablespoon of strong coffee is sometimes added to enhance the chocolate flavor. Vanilla extract, salt, and cinnamon are additionally recommended in some cases to add extra flavor.

The cakes are typically baked in individual portions in ramekins, or brioche molds. However, there are a number of creative variations in chocolate lava cakes or molten chocolate cakes such as preparing the cakes in a coffee or tea mug. A variation of the cake can be prepared in a microwave oven.

A scoop of ice cream, fresh fruit, a drizzling of fruit or chocolate sauce and dustings of powdered sugar are typical enhancements. Mint leaves are sometimes used as a garnish.

== See also ==
- Chocolate cake
- Death by Chocolate
- Mississippi mud pie
- Moelleux au chocolat
- Sticky toffee pudding
- List of desserts
