= Torta caprese =

Italian chocolate cake

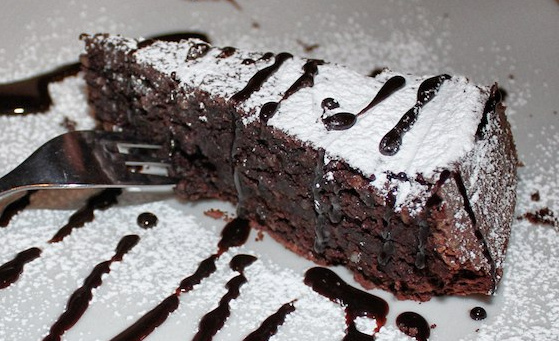
- Alternative names: Torta di mandorle, torta alle mandorle
- Type: Flourless chocolate cake
- Place of origin: Italy
- Region or state: Capri, Gulf of Naples
- Main ingredients: Almonds, butter, chocolate, eggs, salt, sugar

Torta caprese is a flourless chocolate cake made with almonds. It usually contains butter, eggs, salt, and sugar, producing a dense, dark cake.

The origins of torta caprese is unclear, and have become the subject of culinary legends, many featuring a forgetful or distracted baker inventing the cake by accident. Today, it is among the most famous dishes in Neapolitan cuisine. In the island of Capri and broader Campania region, both torta caprese made at home and purchased from pasticceria ('pastry shop') are popular.

Preparations of torta caprese are simple but vary widely, sometimes including flavours such as bitter orange and the liqueur Strega. In Italy the cake is usually topped with designs made using powdered sugar, often taking the form of words, the faraglioni di Capri, or an outline of a crocheted doily. A variation named torta anacaprese uses white chocolate instead of dark and adds Capri lemon.

== Origins ==
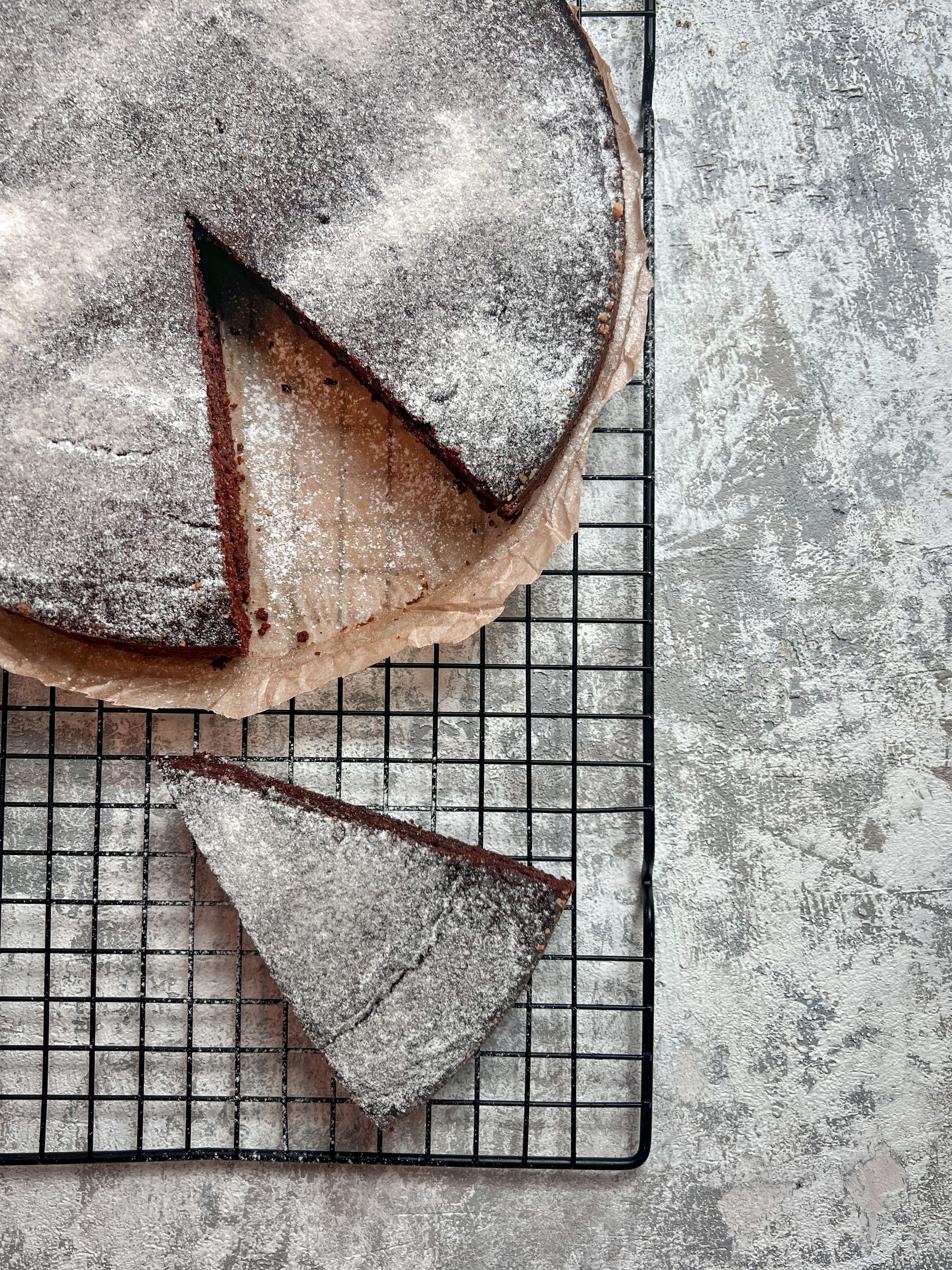
Torta caprese

Chocolate cakes appear infrequently in Italian cuisine despite Italian chocolates being acclaimed—torta caprese is an exception. There is little historical record of its creation, and it does not appear in several major 20th-century Italian cookbooks, including Ada Boni's Il talismano della felicità (1929) and Fernanda Gosetti's I dolci della cucina regionale italiana (1993), (Note: Gossetti does include a recipe for the Venetian torta nera, a cake identical to torta caprese except it uses cocoa powder rather than chocolate.) creating origins so unclear the cake cannot confidently be said to have been invented in Italy. This has given rise to several legendary creation stories.

On Capri, there are two traditional accounts. In the first, two Austrian women who lived in the Strandpension house in the Capri neighborhood of Marina Piccola created the cake sometime between 1930 and 1950. The responsible chef was attempting to make a different cake and forgot to add flour, creating uno dei pasticci più fortunati della storia ('one of history's most fortunate mistakes'). The other account credits Capocchiella, a descendant of Spanish painter Esteban Blasco in 1950. In this account, Capocchiella was called in at dawn as a replacement sous-chef, where, tired, he mistook cocoa powder for flour while making an almond cake. After putting the cake in the oven and falling asleep, he woke to the smell of chocolate. The cake was a success, and when customers inquired about its name, Capocchiella sheepishly gave "torta caprese". (Note: The reference sources its claims to the book Giallaranci mitili impazziti di luce. Le carte perdute della cucina caprese by Claudio Novelli.)

Another account, described by a Capri chef as unknown on the island, is another case of a cook creating the cake by forgetting to add flour. In this version, the cake was ordered by American gangsters, and the chef, named Carmine del Fiore, made the mistake because of his nerves. The magazine La Cucina Italiana identifies this as the most widely accepted account. Several sources specify details of this event, placing it in the 1920s and identifying the gangster ordering the cake as Al Capone. Another legend dates to much earlier, describing a request for Sachertorte by Maria Carolina of Austria (1752–1814), the wife of the King of Naples. The chefs, who did not know the recipe, substituted wheat flour for almond. This story is impossible, as Sachertorte was invented in 1832.

Since the cake has been made in Capri, it has spread internationally and been associated with the island through multiple avenues: tourists taking it home, Caprese chefs emigrating and starting restaurants, and a media fixation on the island due to its fashionable image.

== Description ==
Meringue is folded into the chocolate-almond mixture.

The primary ingredients of torta caprese are almonds (ground or flour), butter, dark chocolate, eggs, and sugar. It does not contain wheat flour or leavening agents; as a result it is considered a "true torte". Almonds are a common ingredient in Campanian cuisine, and for this ingredient the cake is sometimes known as torta di mandorle ('almond cake'). (Note: Another name for the cake is torta alle mandorle.) Torta caprese is made by mixing egg yolks and sugar, and then combining this with the ground almonds, butter and dark chocolate. In a final step, a meringue is folded in, giving the baked cake a dense, brownie-like interior. The final cake has a very dark color, is thin, and is surrounded by a fragile crust. It is relatively simple to make.

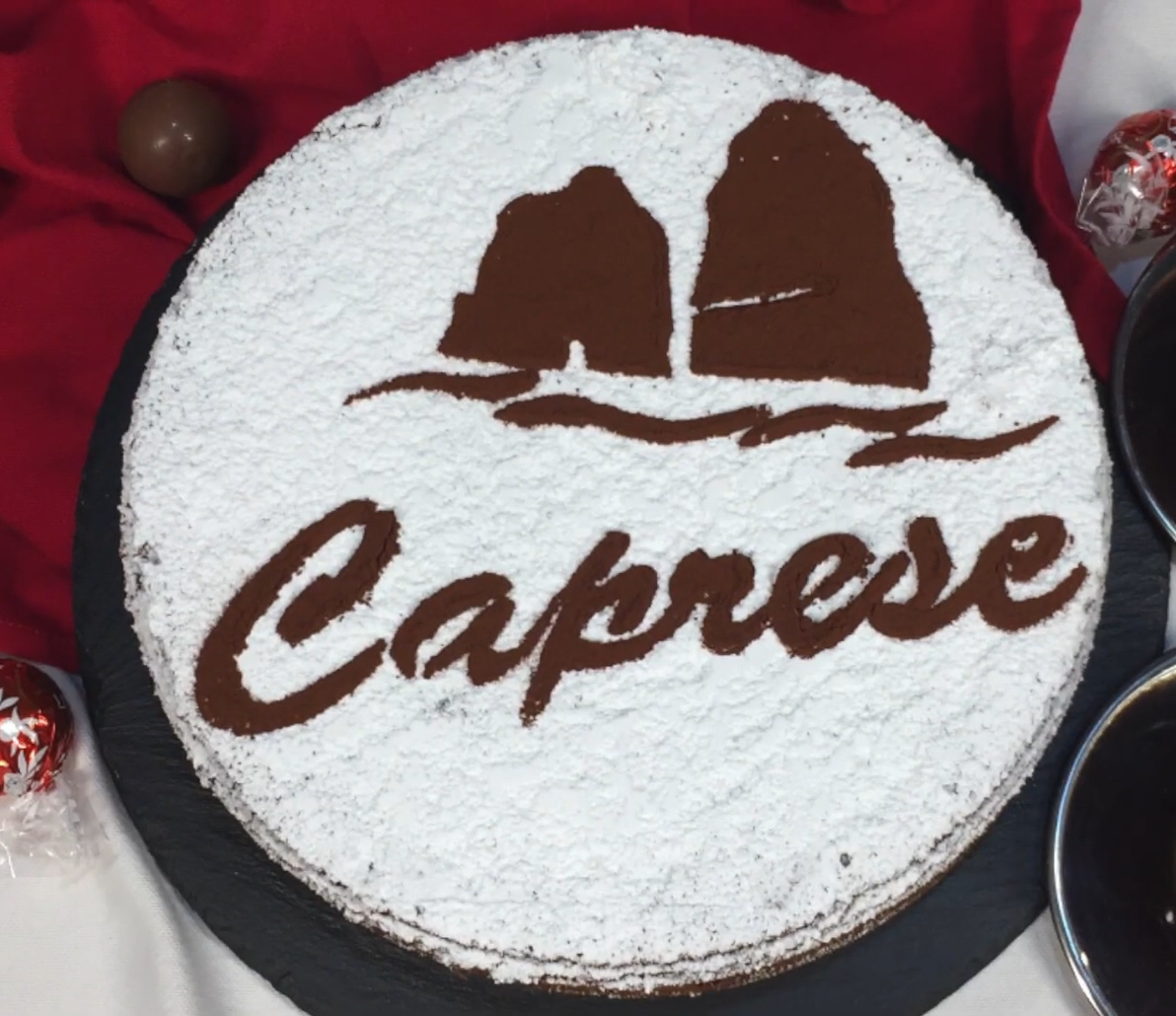
Torta caprese with a design of the faraglioni di Capri

Torta caprese is often served with fresh fruit, particularly berries, or with vanilla ice cream in restaurants. Other accompaniments include whipped cream. Its flavours continue to develop as the cake is rested. Usually, the cake is dusted with powdered sugar, which is sometimes shaped into decorative designs. These include an image of Capri with a single palm tree, the words caprese or Capri, or the faraglioni di Capri, a set of sea stacks off the island's shore. Traditionally a design has been imparted by placing a crocheted doily atop the cake and dusting powdered sugar over it.

The almonds give torta caprese a depth of flavour, but do not necessarily make it taste nutty. Cooking personality Silvia Colloca has described torta caprese as being "as rich and indulgent as it looks".

Torta caprese is similar to other flourless chocolate cakes, including the torta tenerina of the Ferrara region. Such cakes are generally dense, as without flour to trap air, it is pointless to include leavening agents. Torta caprese is lighter than most of these cakes, however, as the almond meal breaks the interior into a looser crumb. As is typical for a flourless chocolate cake, the egg yolks and whites are incorporated separately to reduce the density. Whisking egg yolks with sugar allows the granules to absorb moisture; as this spreads throughout the batter, it changes the cake's texture and helps stabilise the meringue.

== Variations ==
There is no standard recipe for torta caprese and preparations vary widely. Some Italian recipes swap butter for olive oil, while others add ingredients such as essential oils of bitter orange, the Italian liqueur Strega, or a small amount of flour.

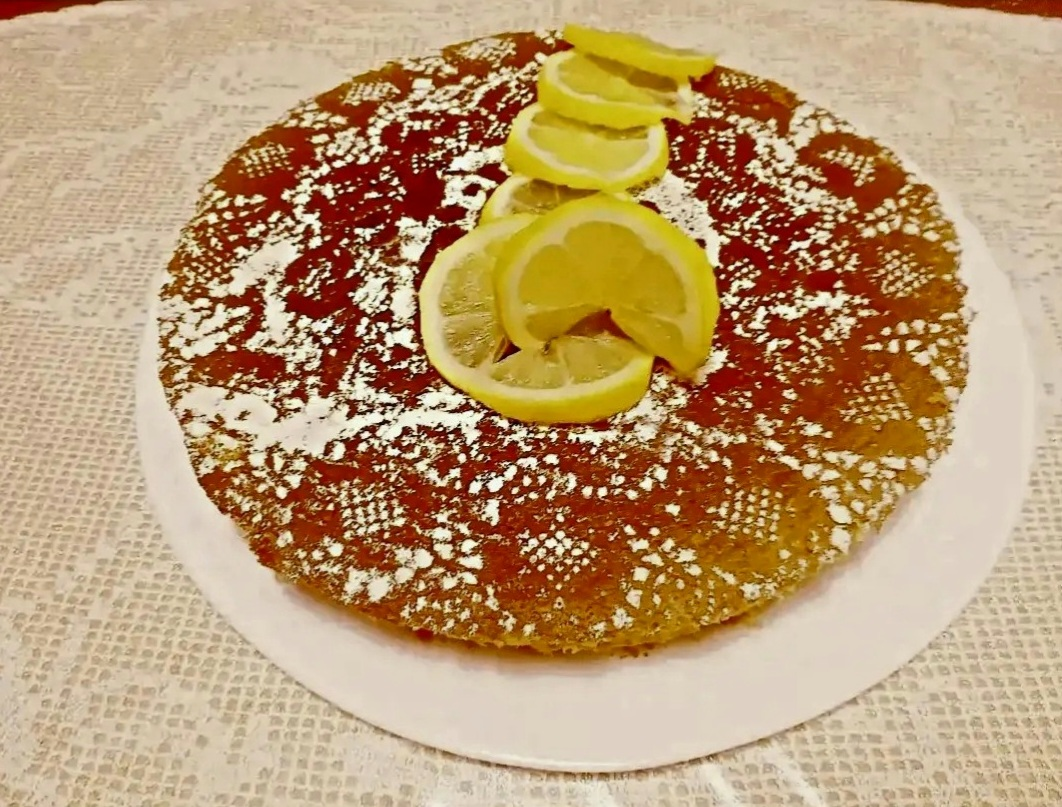
Torta caprese al limone

A version from Anacapri, a region in the north of the island, substitutes white chocolate shavings for dark chocolate and adds lemon. It is known as torta anacaprese and has an almost yellow colour. Torta caprese al limone adds only lemon, using the essential oils taken from the skin of Capri lemons; this is argued by some cooks to be the "true torte of the island". Francine Segan writes that when included, olive oil lends caprese al limone moisture and accentuates the flavour of citrus. Caprese sbagliata is beige-coloured and substitutes white for dark chocolate and unpeeled almonds for peeled. It was named after the cocktail negroni sbagliato, which uses sparkling wine in place of the gin used in classic negronis.

In the 1950s, a "dry" version of torta caprese was created in the beachside Capri neighbourhood of Marina Piccola in an effort to create a product that would last longer in the sun. Although it later lost popularity, a product for the same purpose was developed and gained popularity in the 2020s on Capri, which mounted torta caprese on a popsicle stick. It is sold in both the original and anacaprese versions.

== Consumption ==
In Capri, torta caprese is popular among visitors and residents alike, and is eaten both as dessert and breakfast. The flavour has shifted on the island over the years, moving from emphasizing almond to chocolate, to the chagrin of purists who hold that chocolate should not dominate.

As with Italy more broadly, in Campania desserts are generally purchased from shops rather than made at home. Torta caprese is an exception to this; although they are sold in many pasticceria ('pastry shop') throughout the region, many home cooks make the cake. Babà and torta caprese are considered the signature cakes of the Neapolitan pasticceria. Food writer Arthur Schwartz described the dessert in 1998 as very commercialized in Campania, making it difficult "to find a great example". In Caprese pasticcerie they are sold by the slice and served on napkins; as a result people on the island are often seen outside eating the cake while walking.

On Capri, the dark chocolate version of torta caprese was long the only variety. In more recent years the anacaprese version has become popular and in the 21st century caprese sbagliata was created. In the 2020s, it increased in popularity in homes and some restaurants, and the original torta caprese flavour was developed into ice creams, panettone, and tiramisu (caprimisù).

Torta caprese is one of the most famous desserts of Neapolitan cuisine worldwide. The cake is popular in Italy and is also served in restaurants in the United States. In the 21st century, torta caprese gained popularity on social media, where it was shared as a gluten-free alternative to chocolate cake.

== See also ==
Media related to Torta caprese at Wikimedia Commons

- List of Italian desserts and pastries
- List of cakes
- List of almond dishes
