= Baked pasta =

There is a variety of baked pasta dishes, also called by their Italian name, pasta al forno:

- Lasagne in Italy
  - Vincisgrassi
- Timballo in Italy
- Macaroni casserole in northern Europe, imaqarrun in Malta
- Macaroni schotel in Indonesia
- Pastitsio, oven macaroni, or bechamel macaroni, in Greek, Cypriot, Egyptian, and Maltese cuisine
- Baked ziti in Italian-American cuisine
- Giouvetsi in Greek cuisine
- Johnny Marzetti, a Midwestern American dish
- Kugel, an Ashkenazi Jewish dish
- Macaroni and cheese or macaroni cheese in American and British cuisine
- Macaroni pie in various European and North American cuisines, with or without a crust

== See also ==
- al forno
- Ptitim, where the pasta itself is toasted
- Vermicelli is often browned before cooking in the Levant
