= Pastitsio =

Greek baked pasta dish

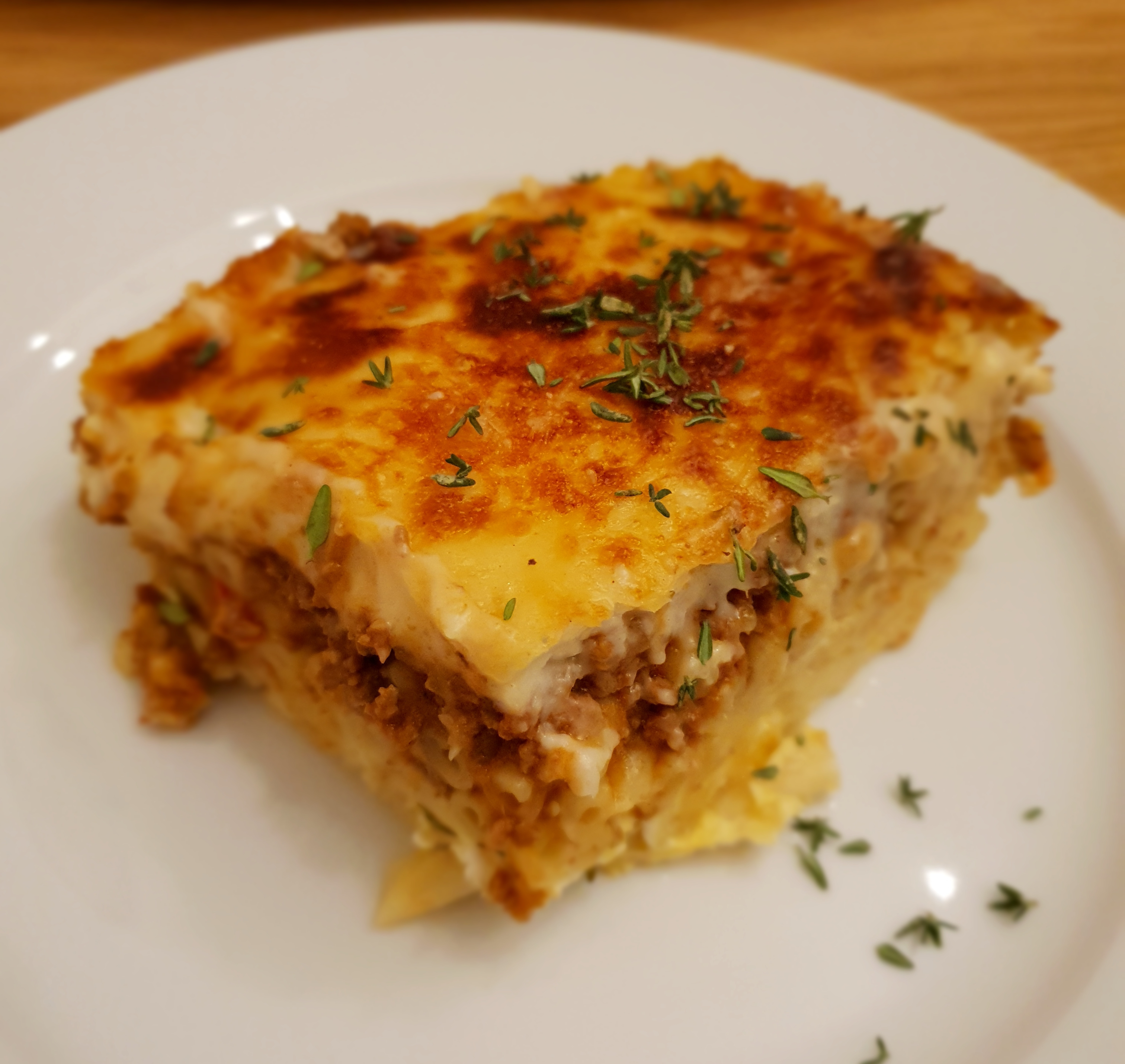
- Course: Main
- Place of origin: Greece
- Region or state: Ionian Islands
- Main ingredients: Ground beef, béchamel sauce

Pastitsio (Greek: παστίτσιο, pastítsio) is a baked pasta dish with ground meat and béchamel sauce from the Ionian Islands in Greece. Variations of the dish are found in other countries near the Mediterranean.

== Name and origin ==
Pastitsio takes its name from the Venetian pasticcio, a large family of baked savory pies that may be based on meat, fish, or pasta, with many documented recipes from the early 16th century, and continuing to modern times. Italian versions include a pastry crust; some include béchamel.

The word pasticcio is attested by the 16th century as "any manner of pastie or pye" and comes from the vulgar Latin word pastīcium derived from pasta, and means "pie", and has developed the figurative meanings of "a mess", "a tough situation", or a pastiche.

The name of an Italian version, lasagna, made with flat pasta, comes from Latin lasanum, "cooking pot".

== Greece ==
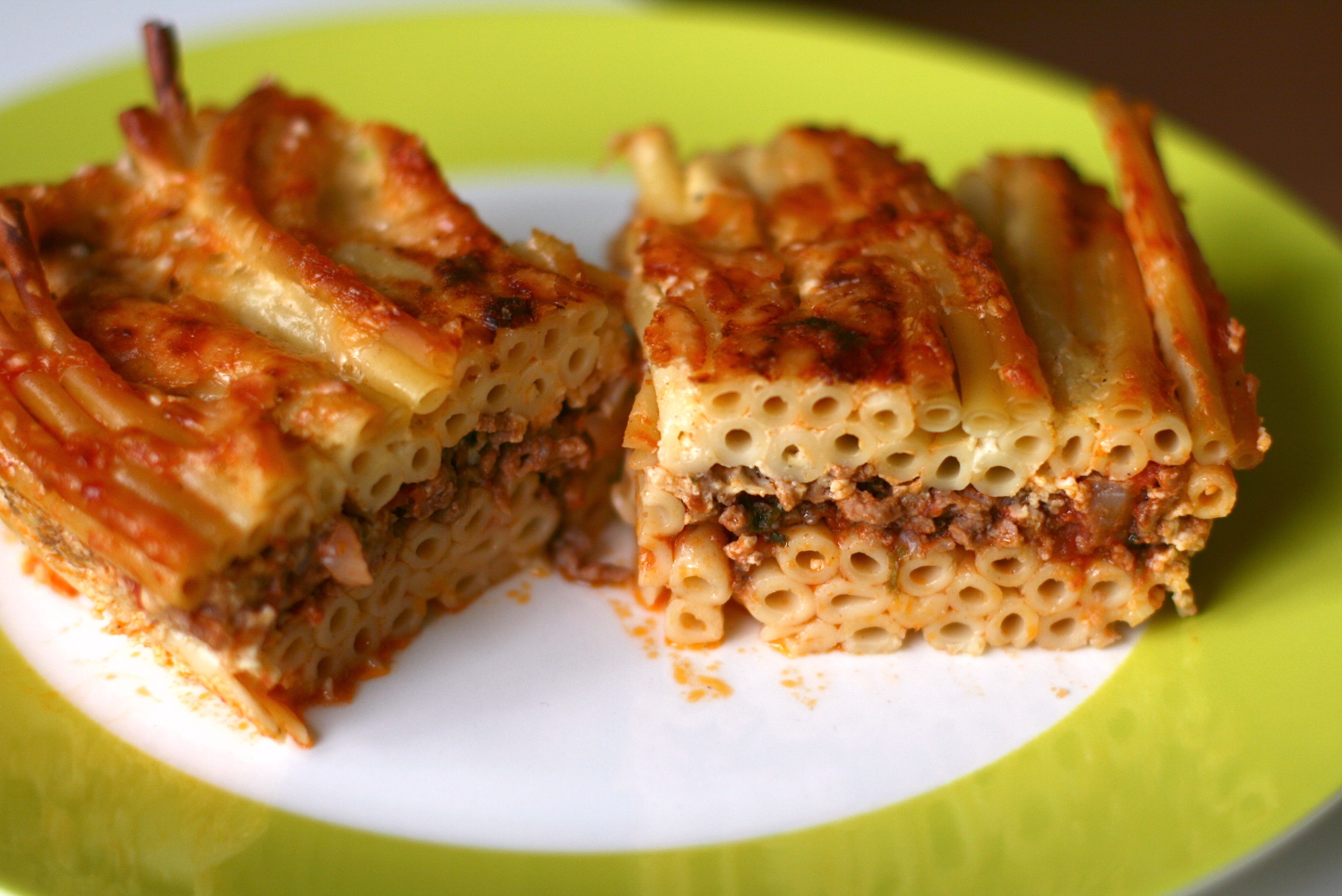

Nikolaos Tselementes, a French-trained Greek chef of the early 20th century, created the au gratin version with béchamel. Tselementes' published version is now ubiquitous. It has a bottom layer of bucatini or other tubular pasta, with cheese or egg as a binder and a middle layer of ground beef (or a mix of ground beef and ground pork) with tomato sauce, cinnamon and cloves. The top layer is a béchamel or a Mornay sauce, with spices like nutmeg or allspice. Grated cheese is often sprinkled on top. Pastitsio is a common dish, and is often served as a main course, with a salad. Other versions, with fillings of pasta, liver, meat, eggs, and cheese (similar to most Italian pasticcio recipes), which were wrapped in pastry, are not found in modern Greek cuisine.

== Egypt ==
The Egyptian version is called مكرونة بالبشاميل macarona bil-bechamel in Egyptian Arabic, i.e. "macaroni with béchamel". The dish is typically made with penne or macaroni pasta, a minced-meat sauce with tomato and onion, and a white sauce often enriched with Rumi cheese. Egg or cheese (cheddar and mozzarella) may also be baked on top. The dish was introduced to Egypt by Greek and Italian immigrants in the 19th century.

== Malta ==
In Malta, timpana (the name probably derived from timballo) is made by tossing parboiled macaroni in a tomato sauce containing a small amount of minced beef or corned beef, bound with a mixture of raw egg and grated cheese. Hard-boiled eggs are sometimes added. The macaroni is then enclosed in a pastry case or lid before being baked. A similar dish without the pastry casing is imqarrun.

== See also ==
- Moussaka
- Lasagna
- Pastelón
- Timballo
- Chili mac
- List of casserole dishes
- List of pasta dishes
- Elder Pastitsios
- Su böreği
- Etli makarna

== Sources ==
- Babiniotis, Georgios (2005). Λεξικό της Νέας Ελληνικής Γλώσσας. Athens: Κέντρο Λεξικολογίας.
