= Kutluma =

Pakistani bread

Qatlama قتلمہ
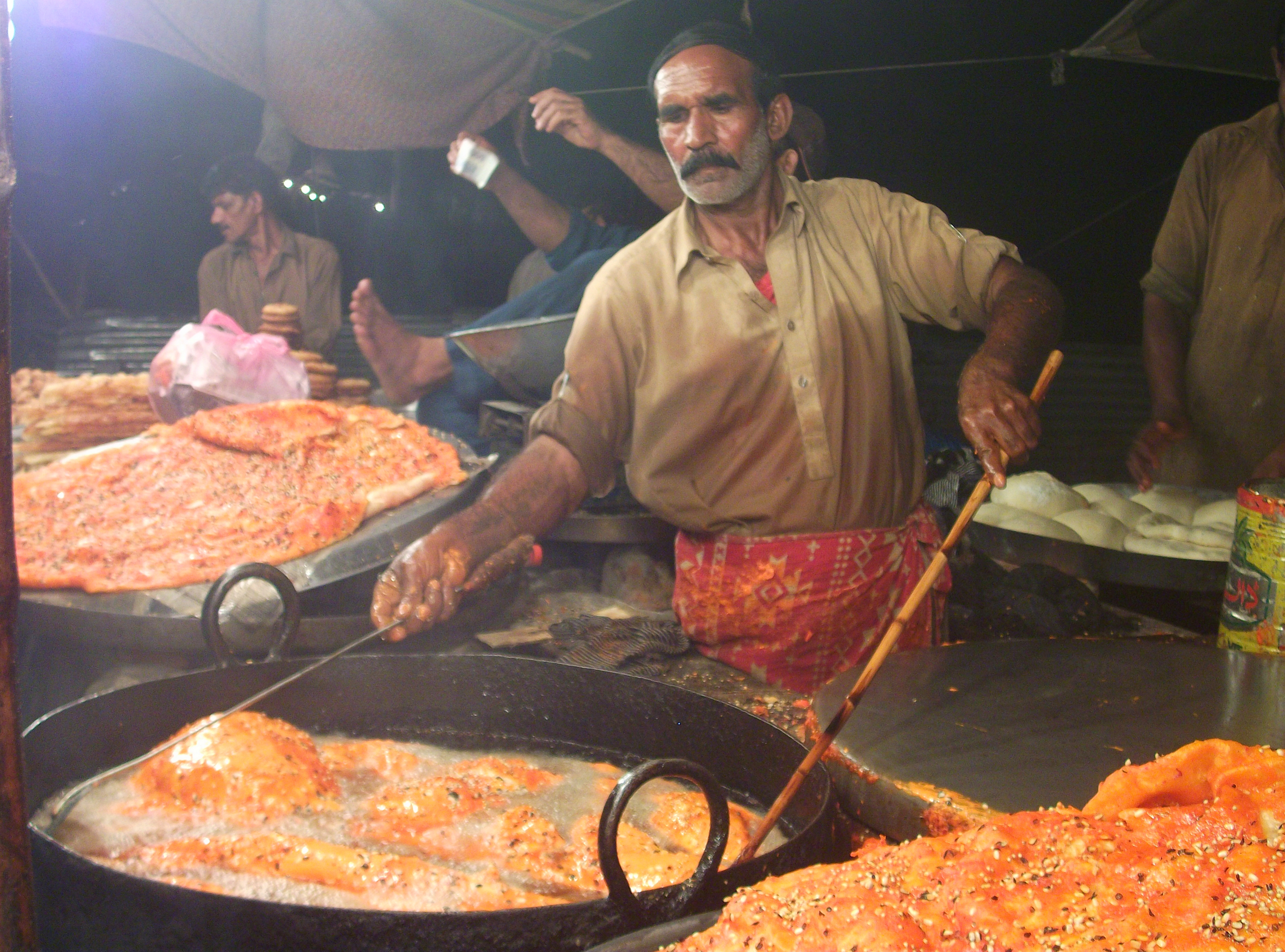
- Qatlama making in Lahore, Pakistan
- Alternative names: Kutluma, katlama
- Type: Flatbread
- Course: Lunch, side dish, fast food
- Place of origin: Lahore (Mughal Empire)
- Region or state: Lahore
- Serving temperature: Hot or warm

Kutluma or qatlama is a Lahori savory flatbread. It is served around the world in Pakistani restaurants.

== Origin ==
Kutluma originates in Central Asian cuisine and the name derives from the Turkic word katlama meaning "folded", from the verb katlamak "to fold", likely referring to the traditional method of preparing the original Central Asian variety. The dish was evidently brought to the Punjab region by the Turco-Mongol Mughal Empire.

== Preparation ==
It is made with dough mixed with powdered red chilli peppers, garam masala (a hot spice blend) and red food coloring. Small balls of this dough are sprinkled with mashed urad dal, coriander and anar dana, rolled out and then deep-fried in oil. Sometimes before frying, it is also covered with besan (chickpea flour).

== Regional varieties ==
In many places around Pakistan, qatlama has a yeast-based dough and is topped with spiced minced beef or lamb. This variety differs from the vegan dish primarily served in the eastern city of Lahore.
