= American goulash =

American pasta and ground beef dish

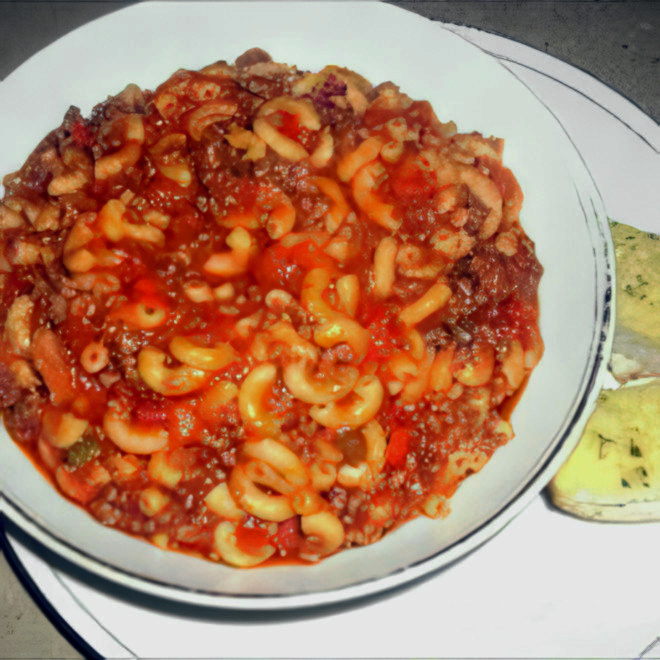
- Alternative names: Goulash, slumgullion
- Type: Casserole
- Place of origin: United States
- Region or state: Midwestern United States, Inland Northwest
- Main ingredients: Beef or steak, paprika, pasta, tomatoes

American goulash, sometimes called slumgullion or Minnesota goulash, is an American dish, similar to American chop suey. American goulash is usually referred to in the Midwestern and Southern United States as simply "goulash", and is commonly regarded as comfort food. It is a descendant or variant of Hungarian goulash.

== History and typical preparation ==
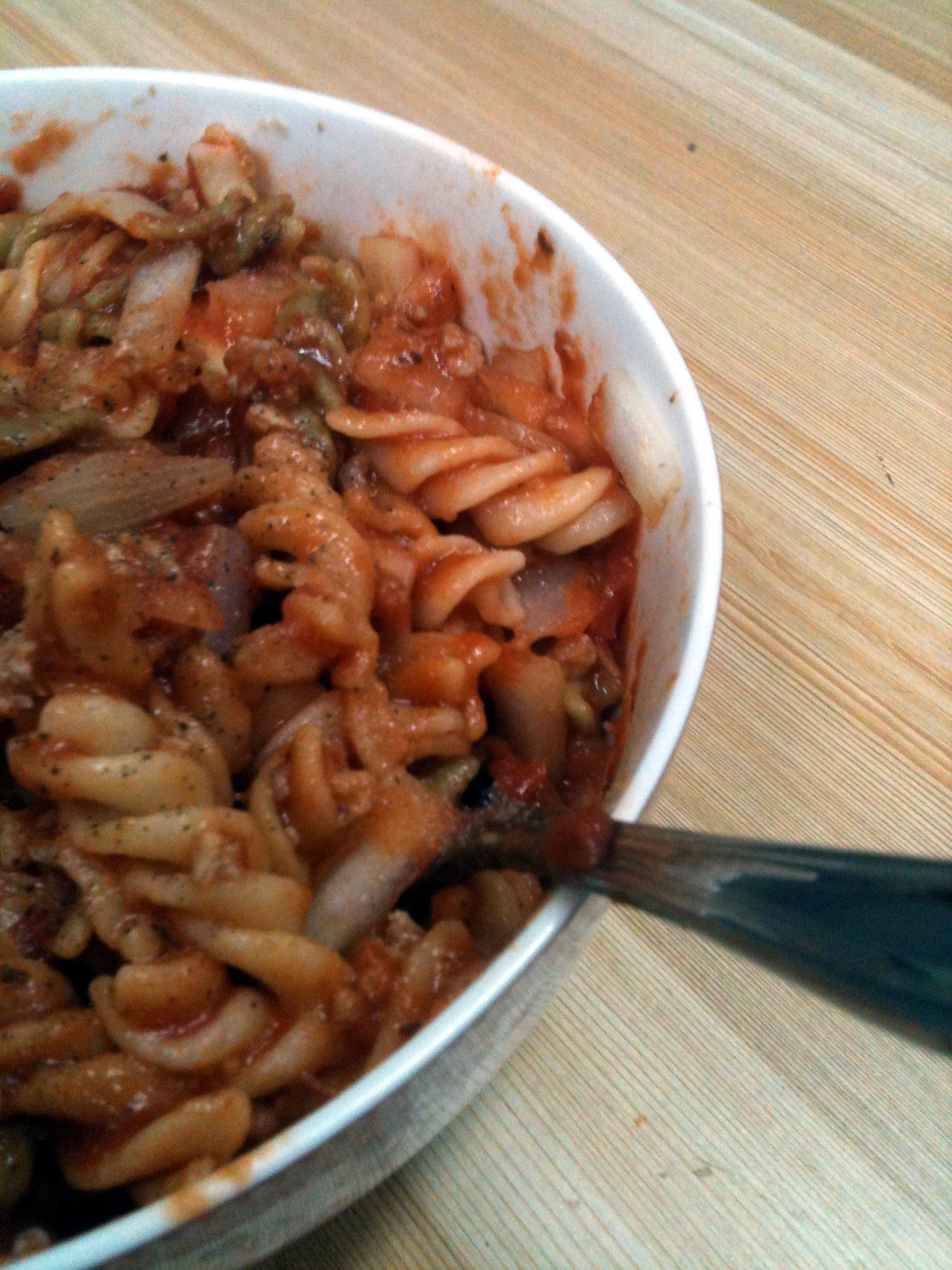
A variant using fusilli pasta

American goulash, mentioned in cookbooks since at least 1914, exists in a number of variant recipes. Originally a dish of seasoned beef, core ingredients now include various kinds of pasta (usually macaroni or egg noodles), ground beef cooked with aromatics such as onions and garlic, and some form of tomatoes, whether canned tomatoes (whole, diced, or crushed are all common variants), tomato sauce, or tomato paste. Additionally, some variations of American goulash include cheese.

== See also ==
- American chop suey
- Goulash
- Hamburger Helper
- List of casserole dishes
- List of pasta dishes
- List of regional dishes of the United States
- Johnny Marzetti
