= American chop suey =

New England pasta and ground beef casserole

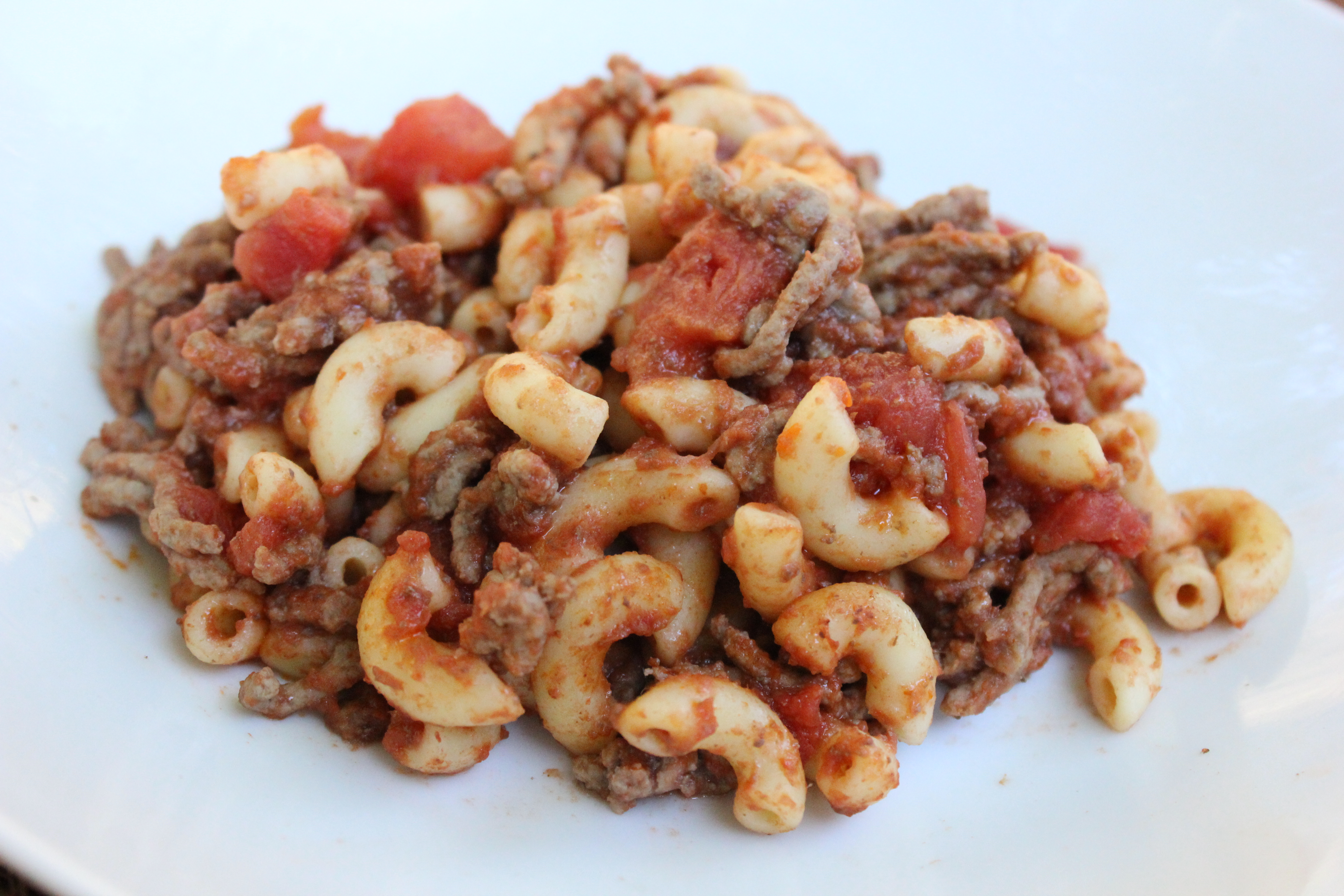
- American chop suey
- Alternative names: American goulash
- Course: Main dish
- Place of origin: United States
- Region or state: New England
- Serving temperature: Hot
- Main ingredients: Macaroni, ground beef, tomato-based sauce, and various vegetables (usually green peppers and onions)
- Similar dishes: Beefaroni, cheeseburger macaroni, chili mac, Johnny Marzetti, macaroni with beef and tomatoes

American chop suey is an American pasta casserole made with ground beef, macaroni and a seasoned tomato sauce, found in the cuisine of New England and other regions of the United States. Outside New England, it is sometimes called American goulash or Johnny Marzetti, among other names. Despite its name, it has only a very distant relation to the chop suey of Chinese and American Chinese cuisine.

Though this comfort food is influenced by Italian-American cuisine, as well as older New England quick and practical meals like the "potato bargain" and "necessity mess", it is known as "American chop suey" both because it is a sometimes-haphazard hodgepodge of meat, vegetables and Italian seasonings, and because it once used rice, a staple ingredient in Chinese cuisine, instead of pasta.

Standard American chop suey consists of elbow macaroni and bits of cooked ground beef with sautéed onions in a thick tomato-based sauce.

== See also ==
- American goulash
- Chili mac
- List of pasta dishes
- List of regional dishes of the United States
- Makarony po-flotski
