= Johnny Marzetti =

American pasta casserole

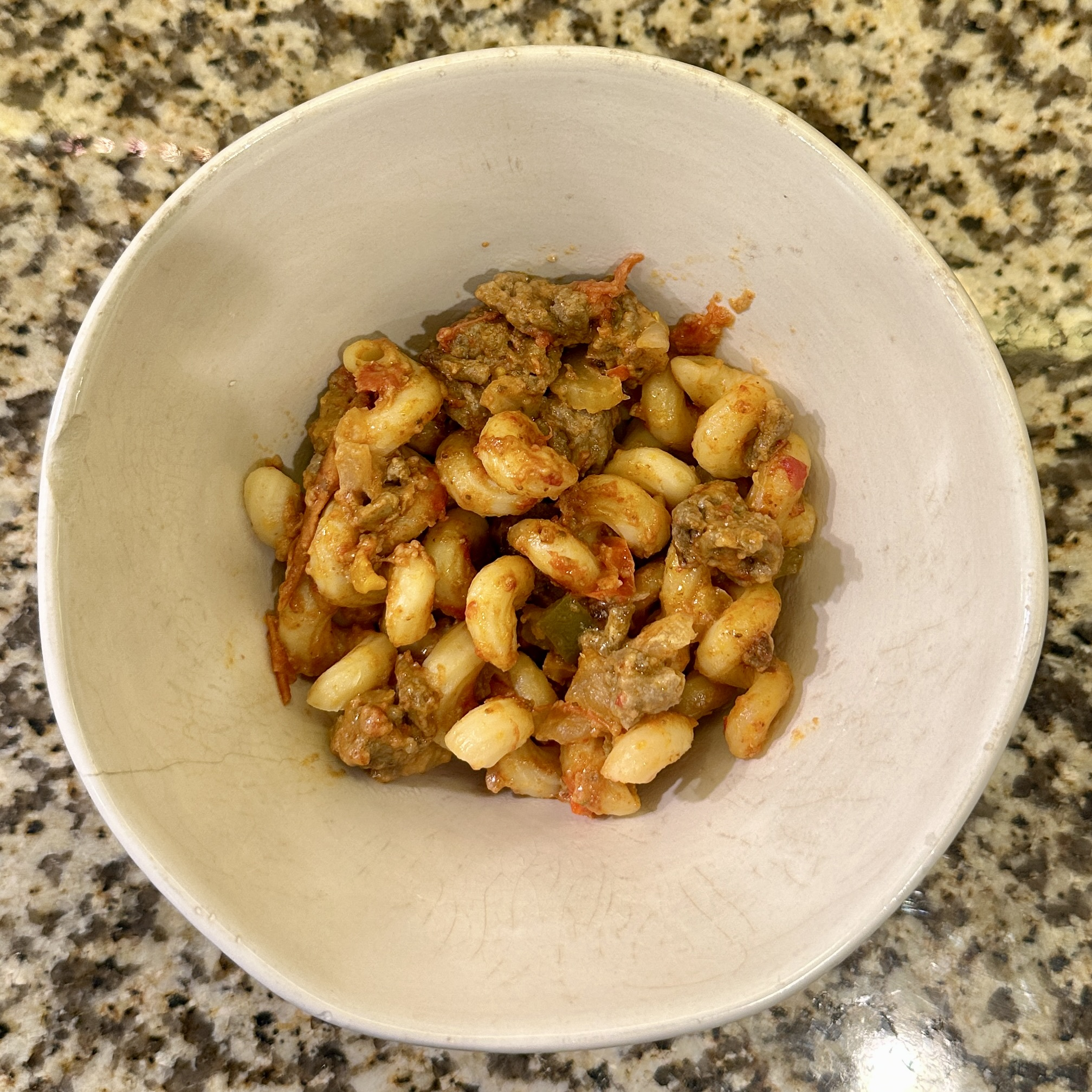
- Johnny Marzetti is a pasta casserole popular in the American Midwest and the former Panama Canal Zone.
- Alternative names: Johnny Mazetti
- Course: Main dish
- Place of origin: United States
- Region or state: Columbus, Ohio, Midwestern United States
- Serving temperature: Hot
- Main ingredients: Pasta, ground beef, tomatoes, cheese
- Variations: mushrooms, vegetables, olives
- Similar dishes: Chili mac, American goulash

Johnny Marzetti, sometimes called Johnny Mazetti, John Mazzeti, or Joe Mazetti, is an American casserole dish in the cuisine of the Midwestern United States prepared with pasta, ground beef and vegetables, typically in a tomato sauce, and topped with cheese before baking.

It has been described as a signature dish of Columbus, Ohio. It is similar to American goulash and chili mac.

== History ==
=== Local legend ===
Local legend says Johnny Marzetti originated in Columbus, Ohio, at Marzetti's, an Italian restaurant established in 1896 at Woodruff Avenue and High Street by Italian immigrant Teresa (née Piacentini) Marzetti. However, the T. Marzetti company, including company historians, have said they have found no evidence for this story, that no such dish exists on any menu in the company's corporate archives and that the company had no documentation of any connection. According to Columbus Monthly, the connection between the dish and the restaurant was made only after Teresa Marzetti's death in 1972.

=== Recipe appearances ===
A recipe calling for ground pork and chili powder appeared in the Columbus Dispatch in 2016. A recipe calling for ground beef, ground pork, and tomato soup appeared in the Dispatch in 1953. A recipe in the Dispatch in 1956 eliminated the pork altogether and added mushrooms.

== Description ==
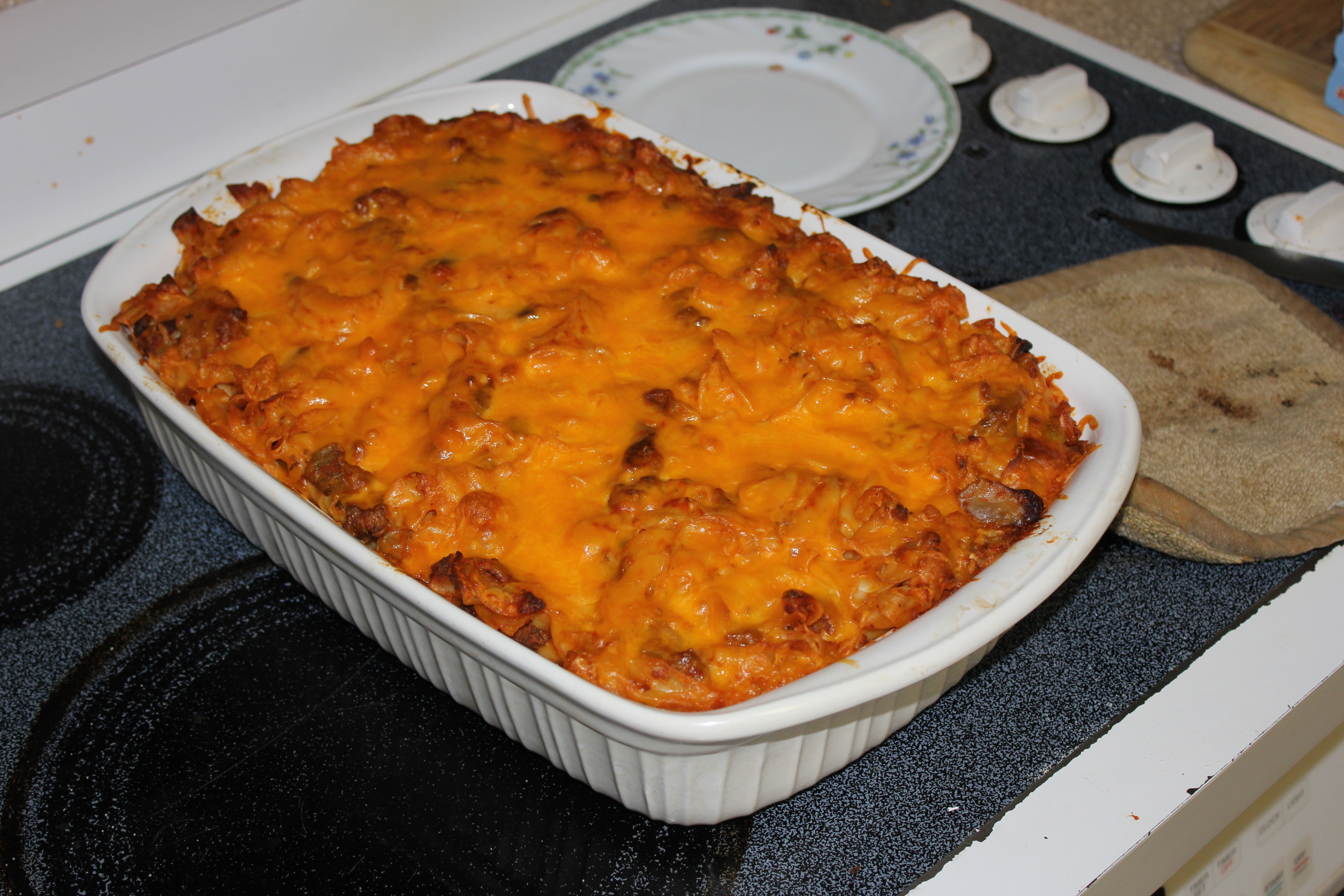
Casserole of Johnny Marzetti

The dish is a casserole prepared with pasta, cheese, ground beef, and a tomato sauce that may include aromatic vegetables and mushrooms. Some versions call for cream of mushroom soup, tomato soup or tomato juice. In the Panama Canal Zone, green olives and celery are included.

== Popularity ==
The dish has been described as a signature dish of Columbus, Ohio.

It is described as a popular party recipe from the 1950s and 1960s by Jean Anderson. A 1956 recipe in the Dispatch referred to the dish "everybody's favorite".In 1963, Dispatch food editor Mary Pegg called it "one of the favorites" and noted that the dish was not connected to the Marzetti family or its restaurants.

Johnny Marzetti also became a popular dish in the former Panama Canal Zone, where Zonians referred to the dish as "Johnny Mazetti". The dish was commonly served in US Army mess halls in the territory and spread into the local region.

The dish was a common offering in school cafeterias in the Columbus area by the 1970s and became popular throughout the state and region, but it declined in school cafeteria use after the Healthy, Hunger-Free Kids Act of 2010, advocated for by Michelle Obama, rewarded school districts for serving healthier meals.

== Similar dishes ==
- American chop suey
- American goulash
- Chili mac

== See also ==
- List of casserole dishes
- List of pasta dishes
