= Su böreği =

Turkish lasagna

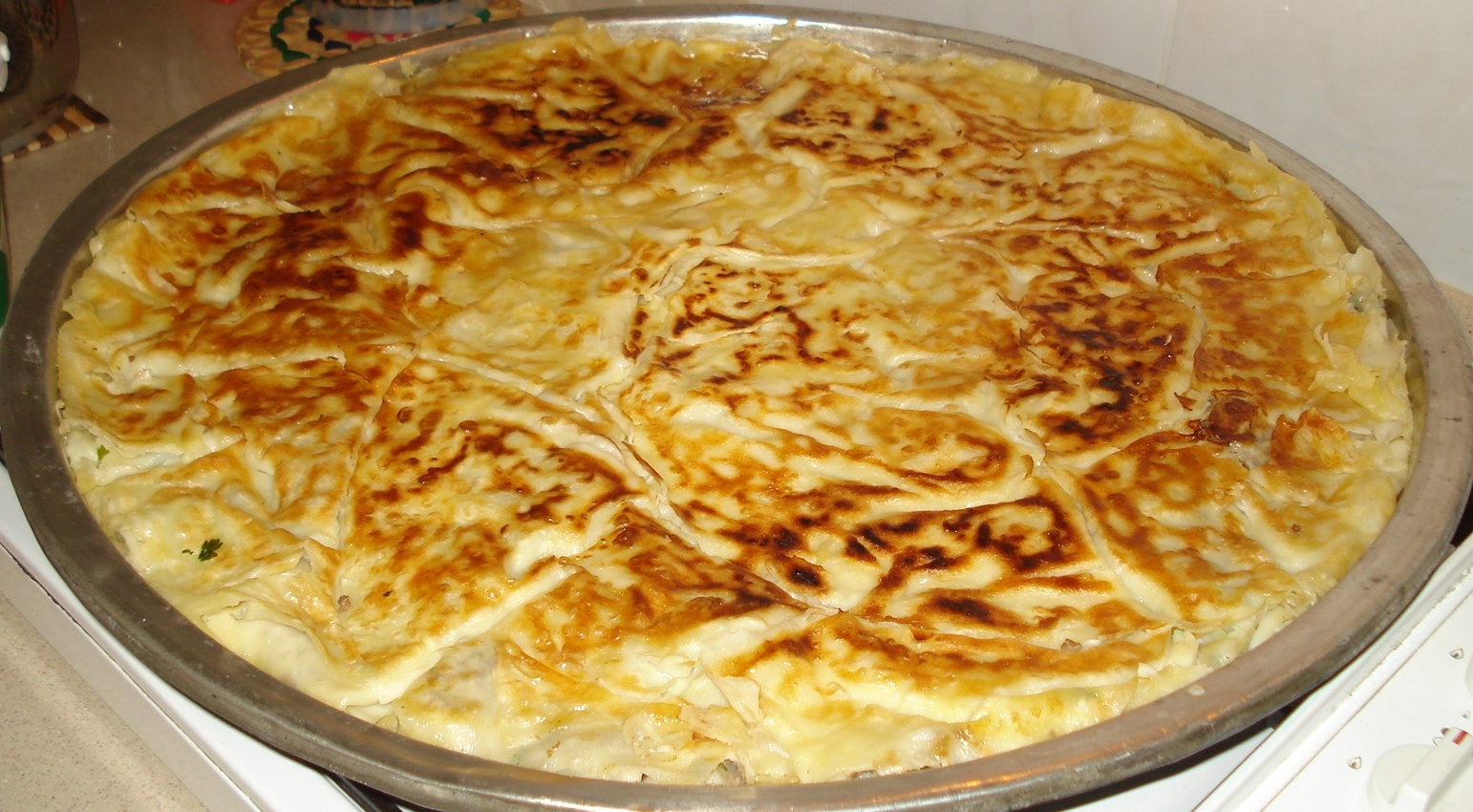
- Type: Börek
- Place of origin: Turkey
- Created by: Ottoman cuisine
- Main ingredients: Phyllo pastry, beyaz peynir or künefe peyniri and parsley (or, in an alternative, recipe minced meat, onions and tomato sauce)

Su böreği ("water börek") is a dish in Turkish cuisine.

Sheets of dough are boiled briefly in large pans, then a mixture of beyaz peynir or künefe peyniri and parsley. Some recipes call for minced meat, onions, tomato sauce. The dish is built in layers, with oil between the layers. The whole thing is brushed with butter and laid in a masonry oven to cook.

Water borek is traditionally served for special occasions such as holidays and important life events such as circumcisions, engagements, and weddings. It is one of the most common types of borek found in Turkey.

== Regional su böreği styles ==
- Adana su böreği
- Konya su böreği
