= Hamburger Helper =

Packaged food product with ground beef

- A box of the Cheeseburger Macaroni variety
- Type: Packaged mix
- Course: Main course
- Place of origin: United States
- Associated cuisine: American cuisine
- Created by: General Mills
- Invented: 1970
- Serving temperature: Hot
- Main ingredients: Pasta or rice
- Ingredients generally used: Seasonings
- Variations: Tuna Helper, Fruit Helper, Chicken Helper, Asian Helper, Whole Grain Helper, Pork Helper, Hamburger Helper Breakfast

Hamburger Helper is a boxed food product manufactured by Eagle Foods, consisting of a dried carbohydrate (either pasta, rice, or potato), plus a packet of powdered seasonings; both are to be combined with browned ground beef (also known as "hamburger"), water, milk, and sometimes mayonnaise to create a complete one-dish meal.

There are also variations of the product designed for other meats, such as "Tuna Helper" and "Chicken Helper".

== History ==
The packaged pasta brand "Hamburger Helper" was introduced by General Mills on the West Coast in December 1970 and made its national debut in August 1971 in response to meat shortages and soaring beef prices and a weakened U.S. economy. In 2005, Food Network rated it third on its list of "Top Five Fad Foods of 1970". In 2013, the company shortened the brand's name to just "Helper".

In 1977, Hamburger Helper introduced its mascot, "the Helping Hand" or "Lefty"—a four-fingered, left-hand white glove with a face on the palm and a red spherical nose. It often appears in the product's television commercials and on packages.

In May 2022, General Mills announced an agreement to sell the brand to Eagle Foods for approximately $610 million. On July 5, 2022, the sale was finalized.

In September 2025, it was reported that Hamburger Helper sales were up by almost 15% from the previous year in the US, due to consumer demand for food products that are affordable.

== Hamburger varieties ==
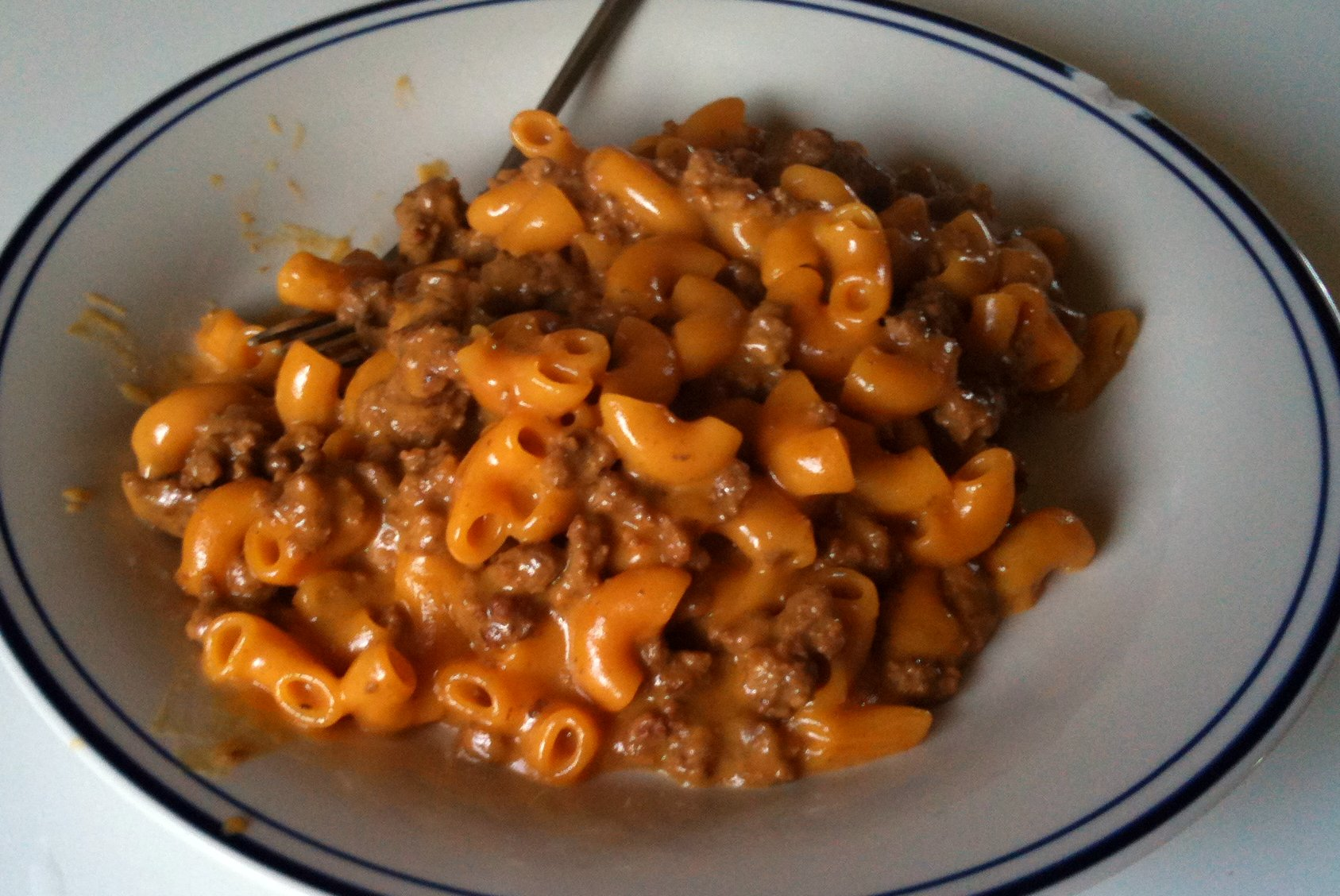
Prepared Hamburger Helper with ground beef

The basic (and most popular) version of Hamburger Helper is a box of dried pasta with seasoning that is designed to be cooked with ground beef. There were initially five varieties: Potato Stroganoff, Chili Tomato, Rice Oriental, Beef Noodle, and Hash. Cheeseburger Macaroni was added by late 1972. Hamburger Stew and Lasagne appeared in 1973. Hamburger Pizza Dinner debuted in 1974, and late 1975 advertising in Canada pictured Potato Stroganoff, Chili Tomato, Beef Noodle, Chili Tomato, Cheeseburger Macaroni, Lasagna, Tomato Roma and Shortcut Spaghetti. Hamburger Helper currently offers a variety of flavors, including lasagna, Salisbury, stroganoff, chili macaroni, and others.

== Other varieties ==
A cream sauce with pasta and tuna

There are also different varieties of Hamburger Helper, such as Tuna Helper, for tuna, and Fruit Helper, a discontinued variety for canned fruit that would make desserts.

- Tuna Helper became successful as the second variety to appear on the market, in 1972. In 1973, three flavors were offered: Noodles 'n Cheese Sauce, Noodles 'n Cream Sauce, Potatoes 'n Flavor Sauce.
- Fruit Helper was introduced in 1973, and required a 16- or 30-oz. can of "almost any [canned] fruit." The can's syrup was combined with milk and the packaged "Helper" to create a pudding in which to mix the fruit; the "crunchy, nutty topping" completed the dessert. The Fruit Helper line has since been discontinued; Its latest newspaper advertising was, apparently, in 1975.
- Chicken Helper was introduced in 1980 in response to the wide availability of inexpensive boneless and skinless chicken breasts, and the first four selections were Chicken Teriyaki, Chicken and Dumplings, Chicken and Stuffing, and Mushroom Chicken.
- Asian Helper is a selection of four main Asian-American-style dishes, three made with chicken and one with beef. With the acquisition of the brand by Eagle Foods, the line has been discontinued.
- Whole Grain Helper was a selection of four dishes made with whole grain pasta, two with chicken and two with beef. The line has also been discontinued.
- Pork Helper was introduced in 2003. The Pork Fried Rice and Pork Chops with Stuffing meals were stovetop dishes; the Breaded Pork Chops and Mashed Potatoes required an oven. The product was discontinued shortly after its introduction.
- Hamburger Helper Bold was introduced at some point. It was a spicier version of certain Hamburger Helper varieties, and a few Chicken Helper varieties.
- Helper Mac & Cheese was a microwavable mac and cheese dish, with flavors such as pizza and nacho. It was discontinued following the brand's acquisition by Eagle Foods.
- Hamburger Helper Microwave Singles were introduced in 2006. They required water and brief cooking in the microwave to produce a single serving portion of some of the most popular flavors. Chicken Helper flavors were added in 2007 despite the brand being discontinued shortly thereafter. In 2024, they were brought back, albeit dropping the "Microwave Singles" part of their name, and were available in 4 flavors: Beef Pasta, Cheeseburger Macaroni, Chili Macaroni and Tomato Basil Macaroni. In late 2025, hashbrown varieties were introduced.
- Hamburger Helper Spicy, introduced in late 2025, is a line of three spicier flavors of Hamburger Helper.
- Hamburger Helper Deluxe, also introduced in late 2025, is a line of Hamburger Helper that contains a cold sauce packet that must be added at the end of cooking.
- Hamburger Helper Breakfast is another product introduced in late 2025. It is a line of breakfast hashbrowns that require breakfast sausage instead of ground beef.

== In popular culture ==
A 1977 book collecting material from the satirical TV show Saturday Night Live contained an unproduced sketch called "Placenta Helper," an ad for a product which "lets you stretch your placenta into a tasty casserole." The sketch was written by Tom Davis and future United States Senator Al Franken.

In 1979, Scott Spiegel wrote, produced and directed a short film entitled Attack of the Helping Hand, which featured a "Hamburger Helper" oven mitt as a killer glove.

Stevens & Grdnic's 1979 comedy album Somewhere over the Radio includes a parody radio advertisement for "Marijuana Helper".

The animated television series Family Guy featured Lefty the mascot in one of their cutaway gags from the 2009 episode "Business Guy". The gag involves Lefty bringing along his brother, a neurologically impaired right-hand glove who advertises the nonexistent "Cheeseburger Helper", and asking Peter Griffin to buy some Cheeseburger Helper out of pity.

On April 1, 2016, General Mills commissioned an EP as an April Fools' Day prank, titled Watch the Stove. According to a press release, the EP was produced for General Mills by a team at St. Paul, Minnesota's McNally Smith College of Music. The EP's title is a parody of the Jay-Z and Kanye West collaborative album Watch the Throne. It contains five songs, all of which are about Hamburger Helper. It instantly achieved a viral status, played over four million times on SoundCloud in less than three days, with many listeners finding value in the brand's promotion of younger artists.

In the The Bear season 4 episode "Worms", chef Sydney Adamu (Ayo Edebiri) made an elevated version of the Cheeseburger Macaroni variety of Hamburger Helper for her little cousin T.J.

== See also ==
- American chop suey
- Chili mac
- Makarony po-flotski
