= Elder Pastitsios =

Satirical figure

ΓΕΡΟΝΤΑΣ ΠΑΣΤΙΤΣΙΟΣ - ELDER PASTITSIOS
- The page cover featuring the flag of Greece, Flying Spaghetti Monster as Madonna holding a baby dinosaur, a Christian cross and "Elder Pastitsios" with pastitsio face.
- Website type: Facebook page
- Available in: Greek
- Website: www.facebook.com/gerondas.pastitsios
- Commercial: No
- Registration: Optional
- Users: 18,658 subscribers (Jan 2014)
- Current status: online

Elder Pastitsios (Greek: Γέρων/Γέροντας Παστίτσιος, romanized: Géron/Gérontas Pastítsios) is a satirical figure of a fictitious monk who first appeared in a Facebook page. The satire is mostly based on the famous Greek Orthodox monk Elder Paisios, with his name and face substituted by pastitsio—a local pasta and béchamel sauce dish, thus combining Greek Orthodox and Pastafarian imagery. The page ran for about a year until it was closed down after the arrest of its creator for blasphemy on September 21, 2012. The case, which started as a Facebook flame, reached the Greek Parliament twice and created a strong local as well as international political impact.

== Background ==
The main satire of the page revolved around Elder Paisios (d. 1994), a monk from Holy Mountain, famous for his spiritual teachings. Much has been written about his person and his prophecies concerning the End times, the upbringing of children, couples' relationships, even the diet Paisios supposedly followed. High-ranking priests as well as believers proposed that the Elder should be recognised as a Saint by the Orthodox Church (which was later realized). The page criticised, among others, the exploitation of Paisios by the press and by Orthodox websites that propagate the alleged prophecies and teachings of the charismatic Elder (according to his followers he had predicted the fall of the Soviet Union and the recent Greek crisis).

The "Elder Pastitsios" page satirised and criticised (with no reported profanity according to the media), various religious aspects in Greece such as infant baptism, religious education in schools and the lack of separation between church and state; these were presented through the eyes of the Pastafarian satirical pseudo-religion "Church of the Flying Spaghetti Monster", which has been used to lampoon the teaching of creationism in schools.

The page created a hoax about a posthumous miracle by Elder Paisios which was submitted to various Orthodox, conservative and far-right blogs in July. The story was based on several existing accounts that were already circulating online and involved the miraculous recovery of a teenager who supposedly woke from a coma after his mother placed a talisman with dirt from Elder Paisios’ grave under his pillow.

The story reached 93,800 Google Search results and was reproduced both online and in print, and even became a cover story on the far-right newspaper "Eleftheri Ora". The 27-year-old page creator would later state that he did this to expose the gullibility of the faithful, and also to show the poor fact-checking done among the religious and conservative blogosphere.

Four days before the page creator's arrest, MP Christos Pappas from the far-right Golden Dawn party had brought the page to the attention of the Minister of Justice by raising a question to the Greek Parliament on September 17. The police claimed they had already concluded their investigation two days before the question was raised in parliament due to thousands of complaints by Orthodox believers worldwide.

== Arrest and reaction ==
On 21 September, the 27-year-old man was arrested in Greece on charges of malicious blasphemy and offense of religion for the creation of a satirical Facebook page called "Elder Pastitsios". Blasphemy in Greece carries a fine of up to €3,000, and up to 2 years imprisonment.

The news of the arrest created a worldwide interest in the case with the Twitter hashtag #FreeGeronPastitsios becoming a global trending topic and a relevant petition by the Humanist Union of Greece has received over 10,000 signatures so far on Change.org.

In a web television interview after his arrest, the page owner said that the evidence that led the e-crimes bureau of the Greek police to him were all provided by Facebook. Pan-Euro communications manager of Facebook, Iain Mackenzie wrote that Facebook disclosed basic subscriber information in response to a Greek court order without knowing what type of charges the user was subject to. According to article 19 of the Greek Constitution, limiting of confidentiality of communications is allowed only in cases of "particularly serious crimes." The Greek criminal code translates "particularly serious crimes" as felonies while "malicious blasphemy and offense of religion" is considered a misdemeanor.

Following the publication of the arrest, Greece's ruling coalition junior partner Democratic Left and the Greek Communist Party strongly denounced the arrest while leftist primary opposition party SYRIZA raised a second question to the parliament, this time concerning the legality of the arrest and the freedom of expression. The parliamentary spokesman of SYRIZA and MP Dimitrios Papadimoulis stated that he would appear as a defense witness in the trial of the arrestee and even the metropolitan bishop of Thessaloniki, Anthimos said on a radio show that he did "not agree with the prosecution, better to leave him alone. No one can usurp the faith". Supporters of the arrestee held a small protest in front of the Greek Parliament on September 28 and on the same night another one in the centre of Athens parodying an Orthodox litany.

The page creator mentioned that he plans on focusing his future activism on the repeal of Greece's blasphemy laws.

== Conviction ==
On January 16, 2014, the creator of the original "Elder Pastitsios" website was found guilty of "repeatedly insulting religion" and was sentenced to ten months in jail, suspended while the prosecutor had recommended a smaller sentence. In the 2017 retrial, however, the case was dismissed, as it was determined that the statute of limitations had expired, following the introduction of Greek Law No. 4411/2016.

== Internet meme ==
The idea of creating fictional characters based on Paisios quickly became a brief internet meme featured in mainstream media and even in T-shirts, occasionally as a reaction to the arrest, and support to the page creator. Such characters include "Elder Parisios" with monk's head substituted by the Eiffel Tower, "Elder Papisios" from the Greek word for duck (Greek: παπί, papí) and the face of Daffy Duck, and many others.

== See also ==
- Criticism of Christianity
- Elder Paisios of Mount Athos
- Flying Spaghetti Monster
- Judicial system of Greece
- Politics of Greece
- Religious intolerance
- Separation of church and state
