= Slavink =

Meat dish

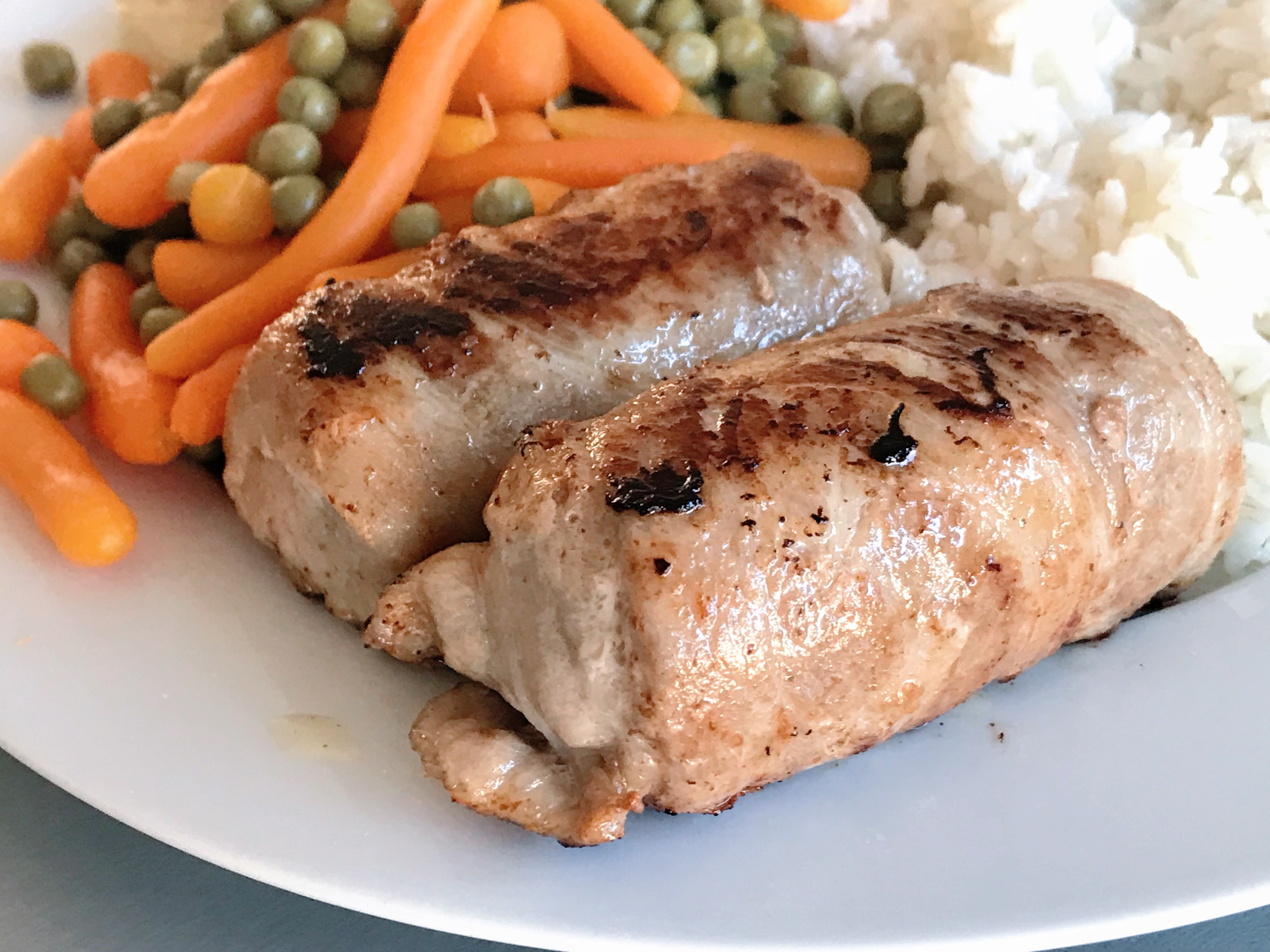
- Two pieces of slavink
- Place of origin: Netherlands
- Created by: Slagerij Spoelder, Laren
- Serving temperature: Hot
- Main ingredients: Pork, beef, bacon, butter or vegetable oil
- Variations: Blinde vink (veal)
- Food energy (per serving): 240 (blinde vink 140)

Slavink is a Dutch meat dish consisting usually of ground meat called "half and half" (half beef, half pork) wrapped in bacon (the Dutch equivalent of bacon is not smoked), and cooked in butter or vegetable oil for about 15 minutes. A variation of the dish called blinde vink is made by wrapping ground veal in a thin veal cutlet. Slavinken and blinde vinken are usually prepared and bought at the butchery or the supermarket; a standard slavink, before cooking, weighs around 100 grams. The bacon is "glued" to the filling with transglutaminase, an enzyme that bonds proteins (and is usually extracted from animal blood).

The slavink was first created by butcher Jaap Boerwinkel in Amersfoort in 1952, and subsequently given its name by butcher Ton Spoelder in Laren, which won him an award, the "Golden Butcher's Ring." Originally, the filling of a slavink was made from smoked sausage. The term "slavink" loosely translates to 'lettuce finch'. The term is probably an abbreviation of slagersvink, that is, a "finch" prepared by the butcher ("slager").

The slavink is often emblematic of traditional Dutch cuisine, as in the book De taal van de verpleging, a Dutch-language guide for non-native nurses working in the Netherlands, and is especially favored by the older generations.

== Gallery ==
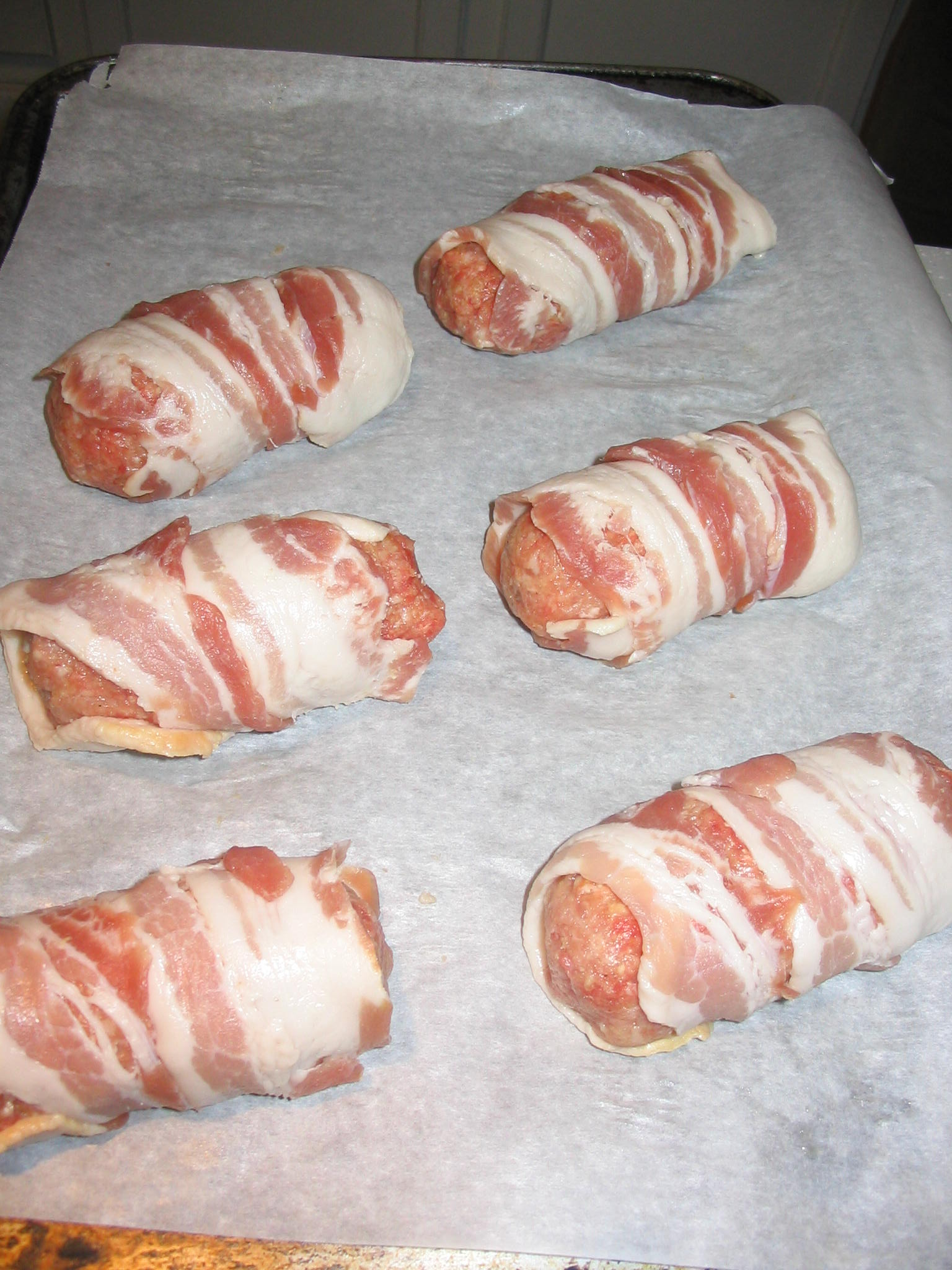
Six slavinken, ready to be browned

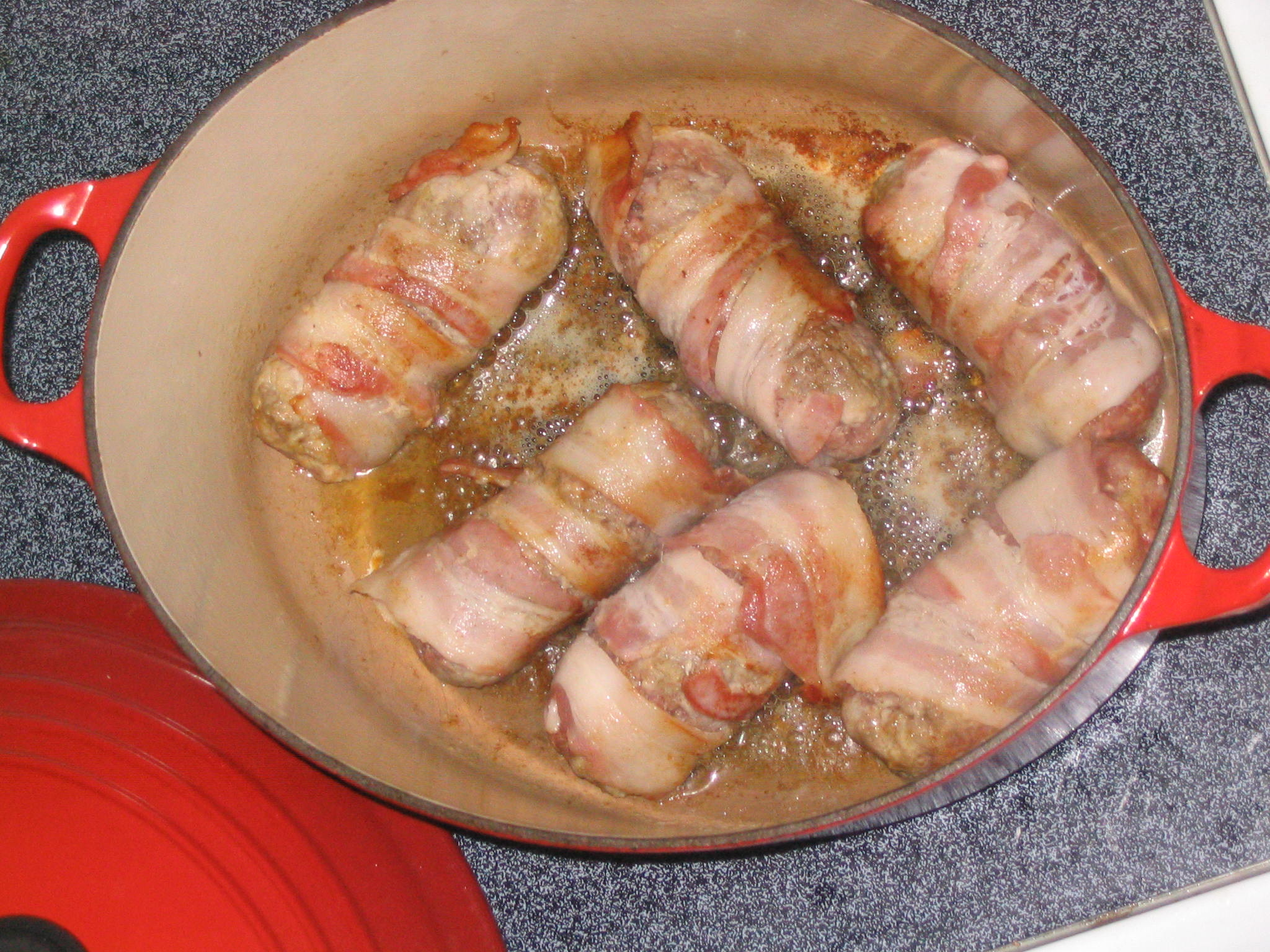
Six slavinken, browned and ready for braising

== See also ==
- Pigs in blankets
