= Makarony po-flotski =

Russian pasta dish

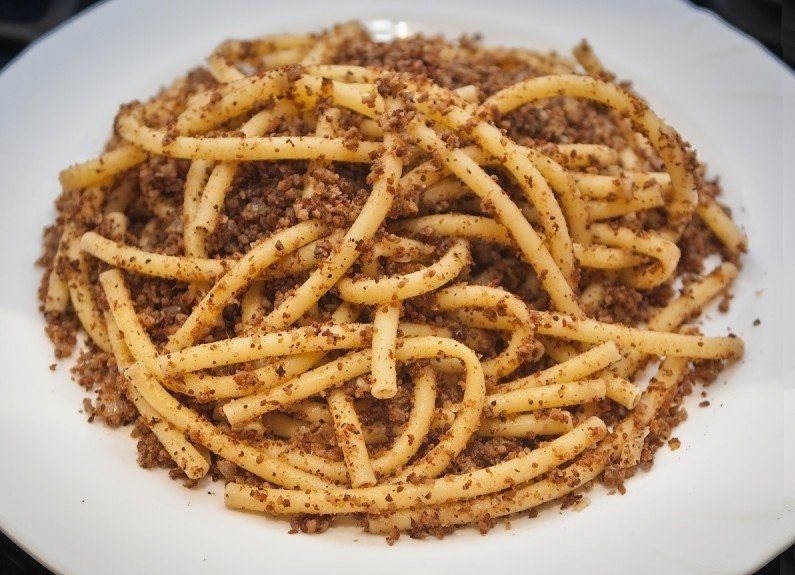
- Makarony po-flotski made with macaroni
- Course: Main
- Place of origin: Russia
- Serving temperature: Hot
- Main ingredients: Ground meat, onions, pasta

Makarony po-flotski (Russian: макароны по-флотски; lit. 'navy-style macaroni') is a Russian dish made of cooked pasta (typically spaghetti) mixed with stuffing made of stewed or fried ground meat (usually beef or pork) and fried onions, usually salted and optionally peppered. Originally served in the maritime forces, the dish became popular in Russia due to its simplicity, low cost and short time of preparation. Makarony po-flotski became especially popular after World War II during times of poverty in the Soviet Union. The ground meat can be replaced with canned meat (tushonka).

In the 1990s, Rospotrebnadzor banned the dish in school canteens, citing high infection risk due to insufficient heat treatment before serving. A similar ban exists in canteens for elderly and disabled people.

== See also ==
- Spaghetti bolognese
- Hamburger Helper
