= Macaroni casserole =

Pasta dish

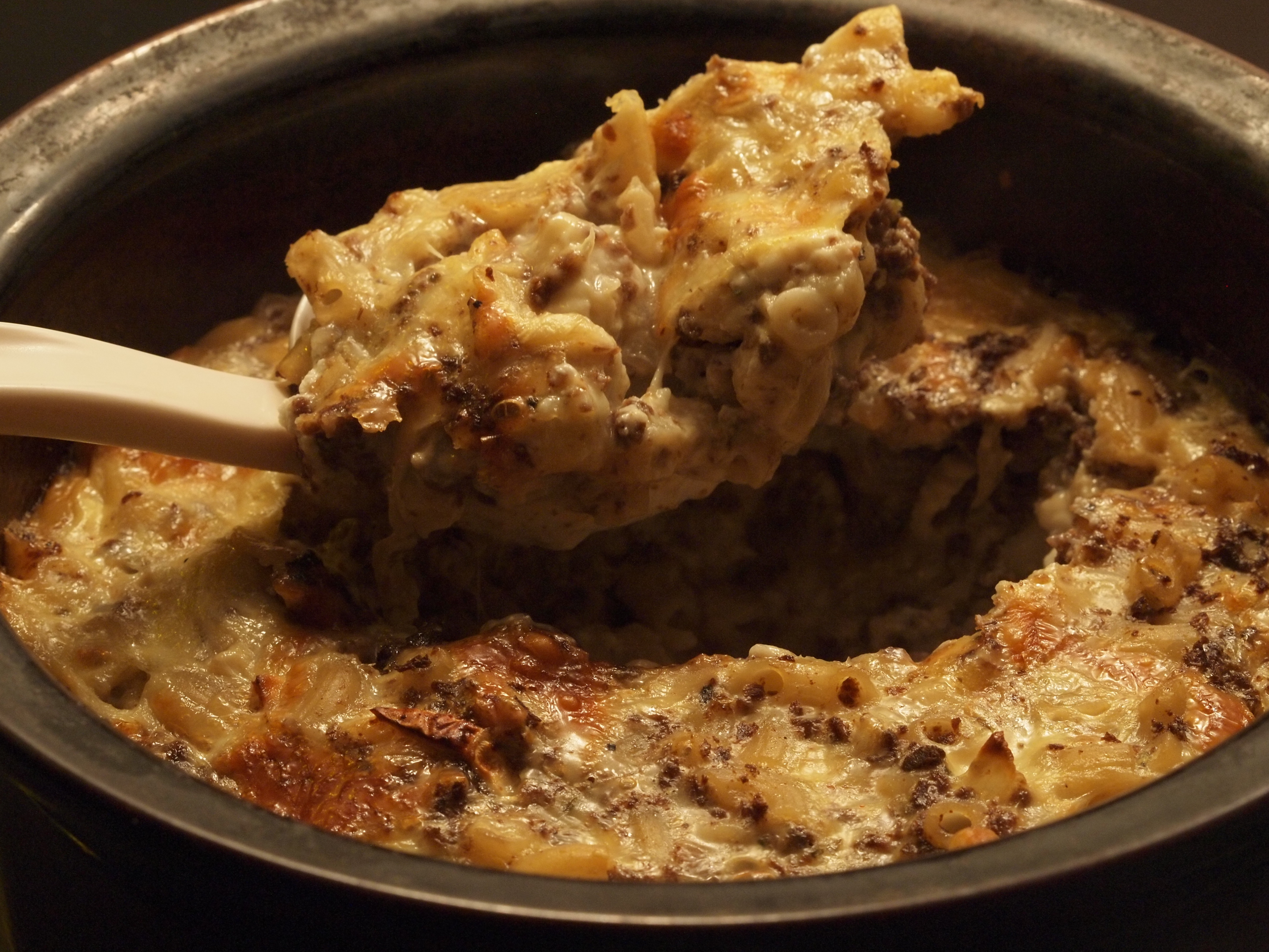
- Macaroni casserole baked with cheese
- Course: Pasta
- Main ingredients: Macaroni, eggs, milk

Macaroni casserole is a dish of baked pasta, especially known as a staple in northern European home cooking. It is a dish of cooked macaroni mixed with eggs and milk with additional ingredients like minced meat, vegetables, or sometimes even fish. It is commonly made with cheese or breadcrumbs sprinkled on top.

== Variants by country ==
=== Finland ===
In Finland, the dish is called makaronilaatikko (Finnish) or makaronilåda (Swedish), lit. 'macaroni casserole'. It is considered one of the most popular traditional dishes. A 2010 survey of 1,100 respondents ranked it as the second most popular everyday dish for dinner in Finland. The dish is most commonly made with minced meat. Macaroni casseroles are readily available in Finnish grocery stores as pre-packaged meals. In Finland, it is served with ketchup.

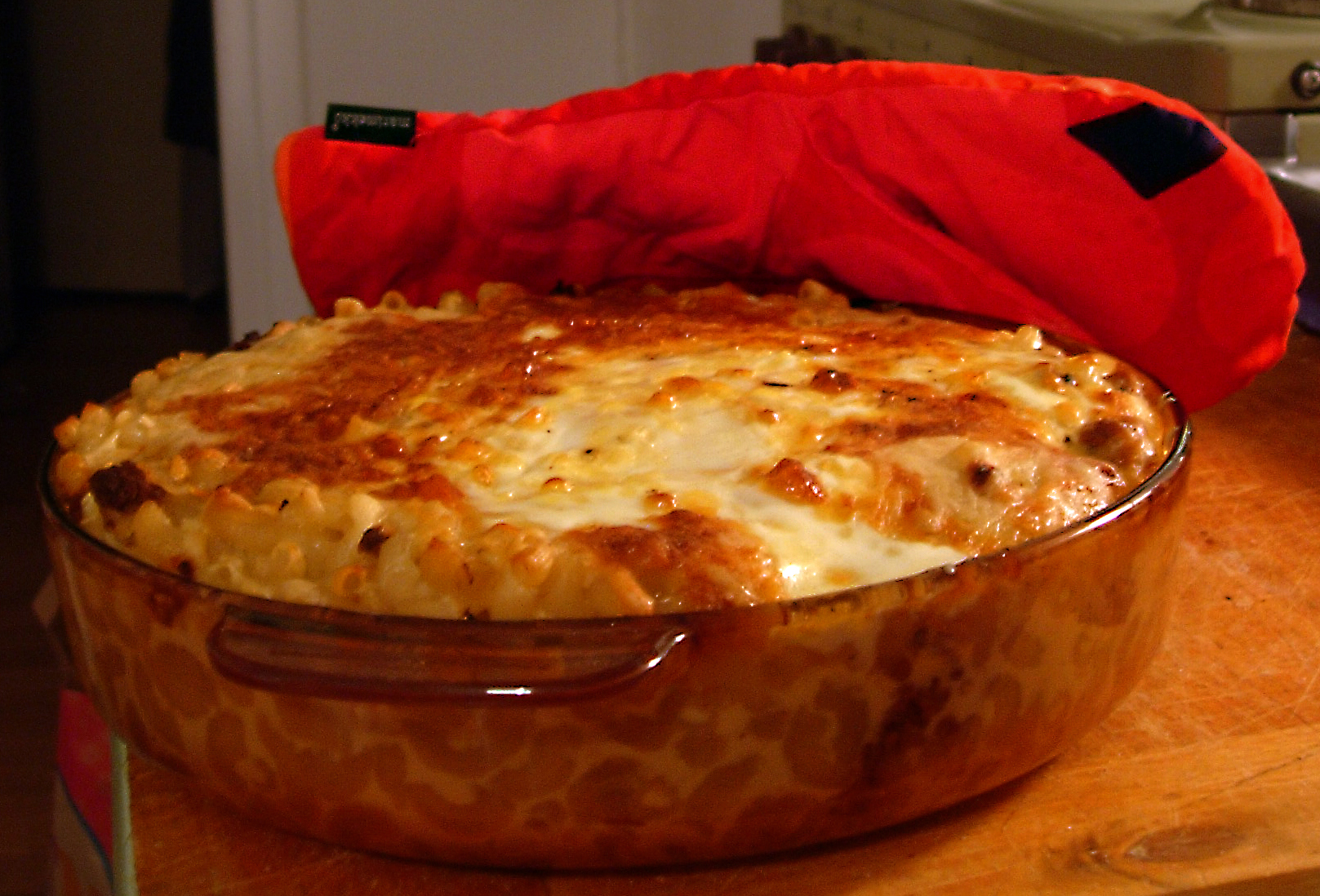
Home made Macaroni casserole in Finland

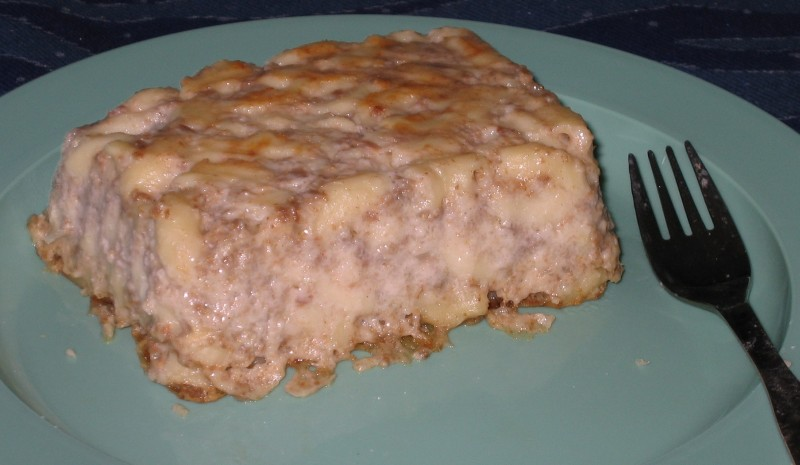
Finnish prepared macaroni casserole

=== Sweden ===
In Sweden, the dish is called makaronipudding or makaronilåda. The Swedish version is usually made with ham, leek, and cheese.

=== Malta ===
In Malta, a baked dish called imqarrun is made with macaroni, bolognese-style meat sauce and egg. Other versions add chicken livers, hard boiled eggs, peas and bacon. The macaroni is usually topped with a layer of grated cheese or besciamella (béchamel) that will melt during the baking process and help to bind and set the pasta. This is not to be confused with timpana, which has an outer pastry casing.

=== North Macedonia ===
In North Macedonia, the dish is called makaroni vo tava, and is made with macaroni, minced meat and a bolognese-style meat sauce. The macaroni casserole is topped with grated cheese or crumbled white cheese when baking. It may sometimes also include egg, like the Maltese version.

=== Indonesia ===
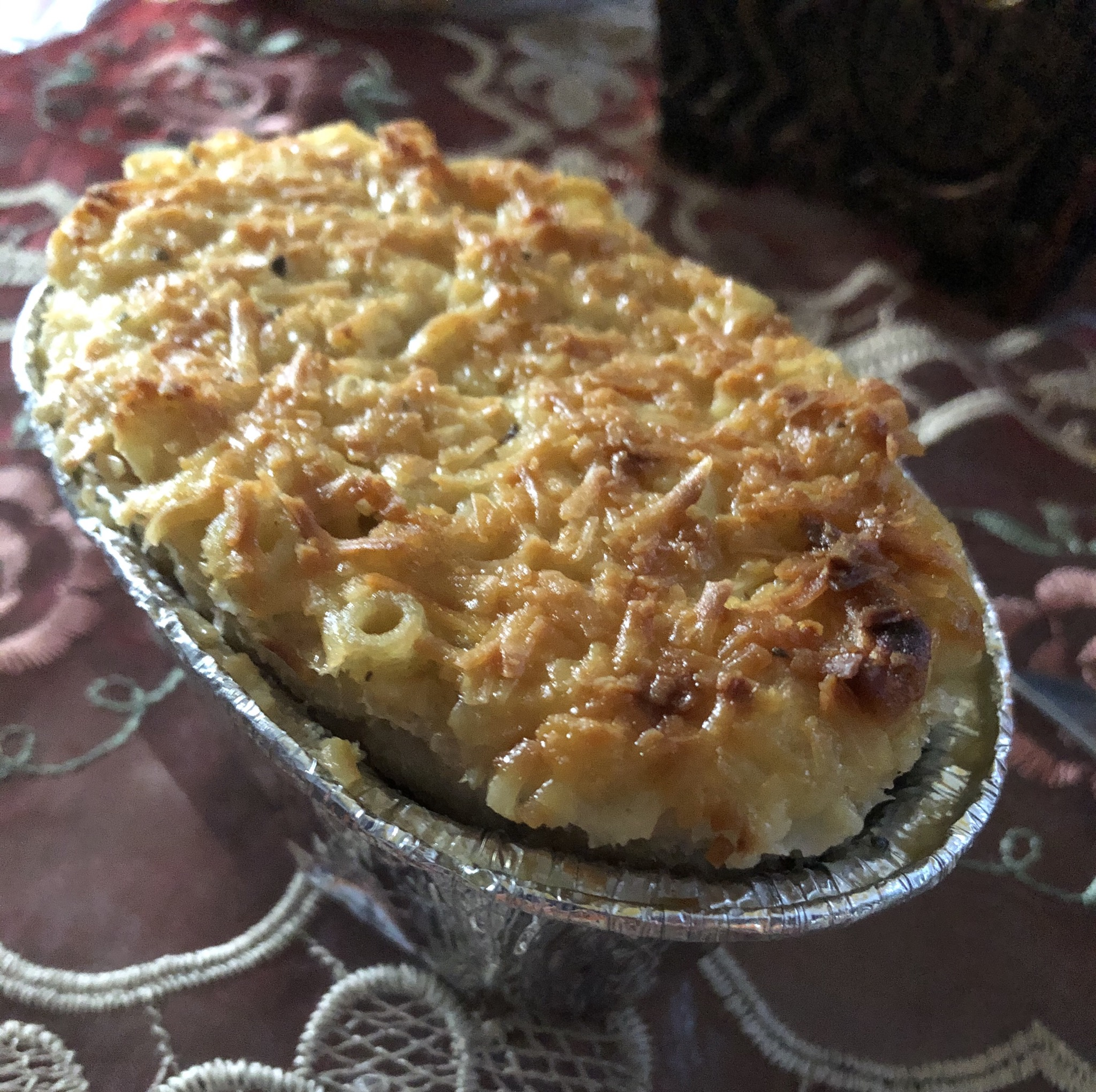
Baked makaroni schotel

In Indonesia, the dish is sometimes known as makaroni schotel or makaroni schaal. This dish was introduced by the Dutch during the occupation in Indonesia. Therefore, 'Schotel' or 'schaal' (meaning 'dish'), borrowed from Dutch language, refers to the container used to make this food. The Indonesian version is usually made with cheese and meat (smoked beef is widely used, alternatively sausage or tuna. Potato is sometimes also used).

== See also ==
- Frittata
- Chili mac
- Macaroni and cheese
- Kugel
- List of casserole dishes
