= Chili mac =

American pasta dish

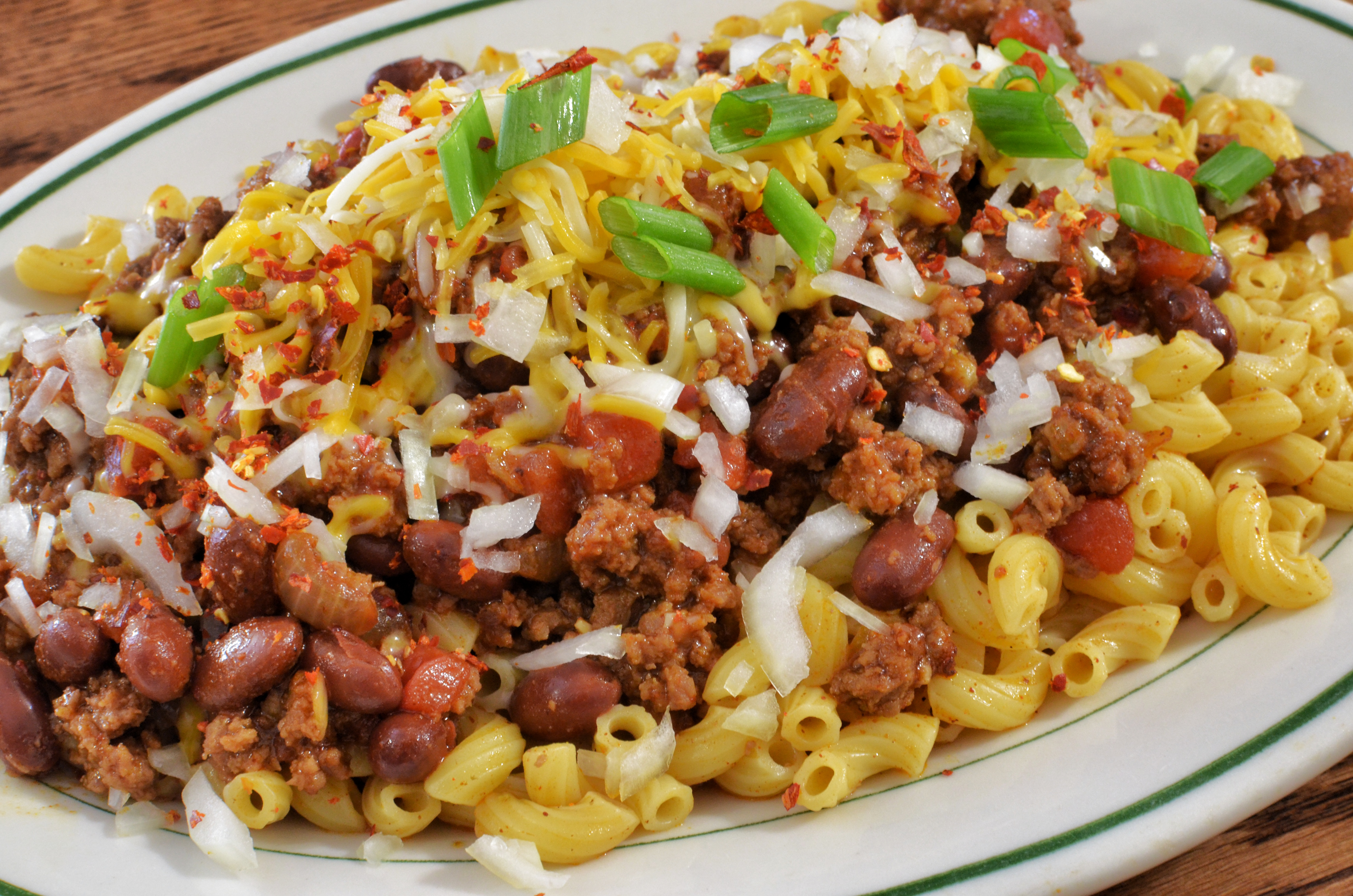
- A plate of chili mac prepared with macaroni noodles, chili, cheese, onion and green onion
- Course: Main dish
- Place of origin: United States
- Region or state: Midwestern United States
- Serving temperature: Hot
- Main ingredients: Macaroni, chili con carne
- Variations: Cheese
- Similar dishes: American chop suey, Johnny Marzetti, American goulash, Cincinnati chili, Macaroni and cheese, Macaroni casserole

Chili mac is a dish prepared using chili con carne and macaroni as primary ingredients, which is often topped or intermingled with cheese. Some versions are made using prepared or homemade macaroni and cheese. It is a common dish in the cuisine of the Midwestern United States, and is also popular in other areas of the United States.

Several variations of the dish exist, and prepared canned and boxed versions also exist. It can be a relatively inexpensive dish to prepare, and has been described as a comfort food. Similar dishes include spaghetti red, a chili-topped spaghetti popular around Joplin, Missouri, and Cincinnati chili.

== Preparation ==
Several preparation methods exist. Basic versions may be prepared using chopped meat, tomato, spices, and elbow macaroni. Another basic preparation method incorporates boxed, prepared macaroni and cheese and canned chili. Some recipes incorporate all of the ingredients together, while others are prepared with the ingredients separately layered. Those that use cheese may use grated cheese atop the dish, while others mix the cheese throughout the dish. Sometimes, onions or beans are added. Some diners in St. Louis, Missouri, serve a version called "chili mac a la mode", in which the dish is served topped with fried eggs.

The dish may be prepared on a range top in a skillet, in a slow cooker, or baked as a casserole. Vegetarian and vegan versions of the dish are sometimes prepared.

=== Versions ===
Chili mac has been a staple dish at American military dining facilities for years. It was introduced to the Meal, Ready-to-Eat (MRE) field ration menu in 1995 and is one of only three of the twelve MRE meals offered in 1995 that has remained on the MRE menu to date. A variation called "taco chili mac" has been consumed by NASA astronauts in space. It is processed by NASA as a freeze-dried product.

Hamburger Helper sells a boxed version named "Chili Macaroni".

== Similar dishes ==
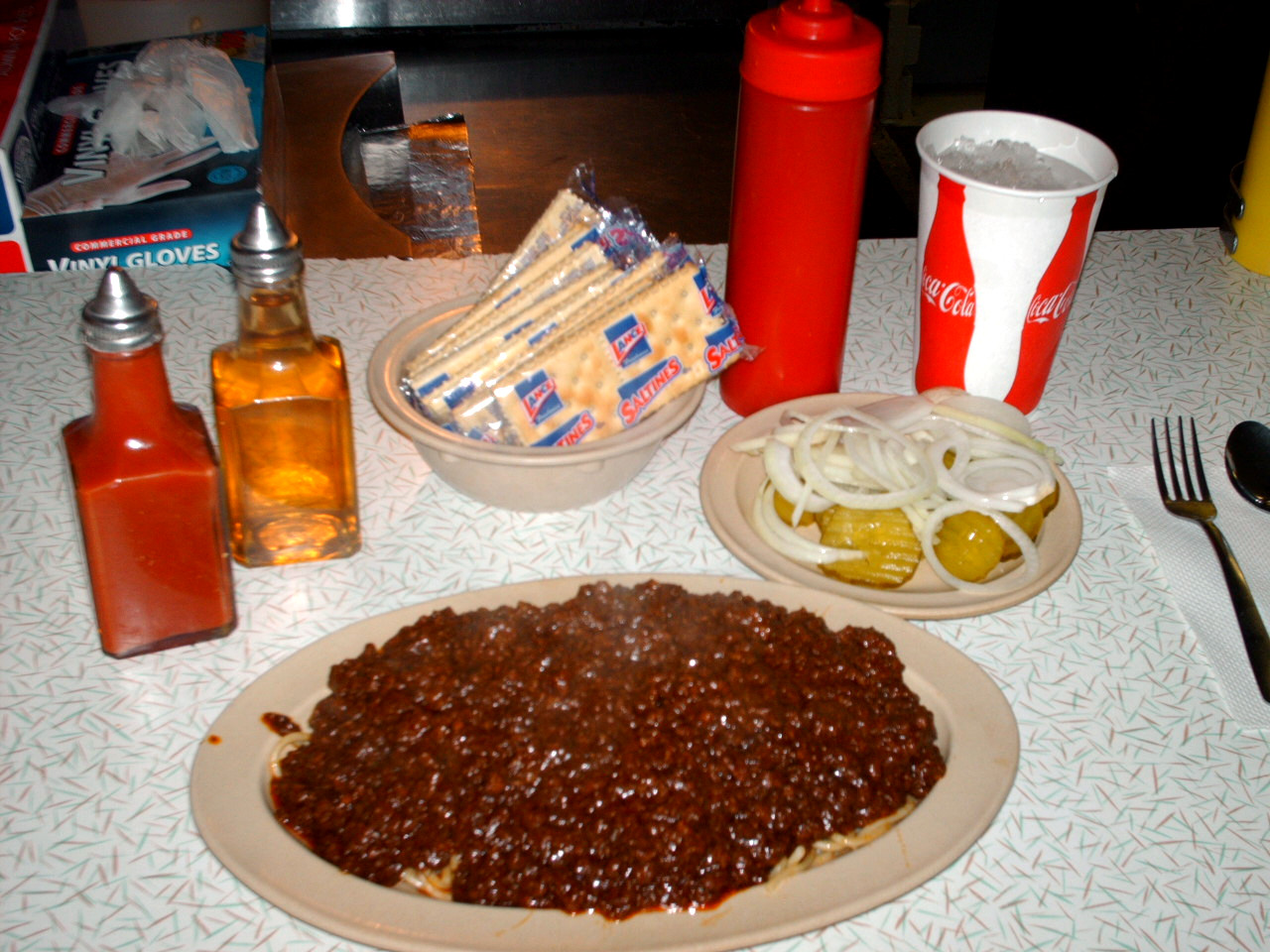
Fred and Red's Spaghetti Red dish

Spaghetti red is a chili-topped spaghetti popular around Joplin, Missouri, and a signature dish at Fred and Red's.

Cincinnati chili is a spiced meat sauce used to top spaghetti which is often referred to as chili spaghetti.

== See also ==
- List of casserole dishes
- List of pasta dishes
- List of stews
