= Tushonka =

Soviet canned meat product

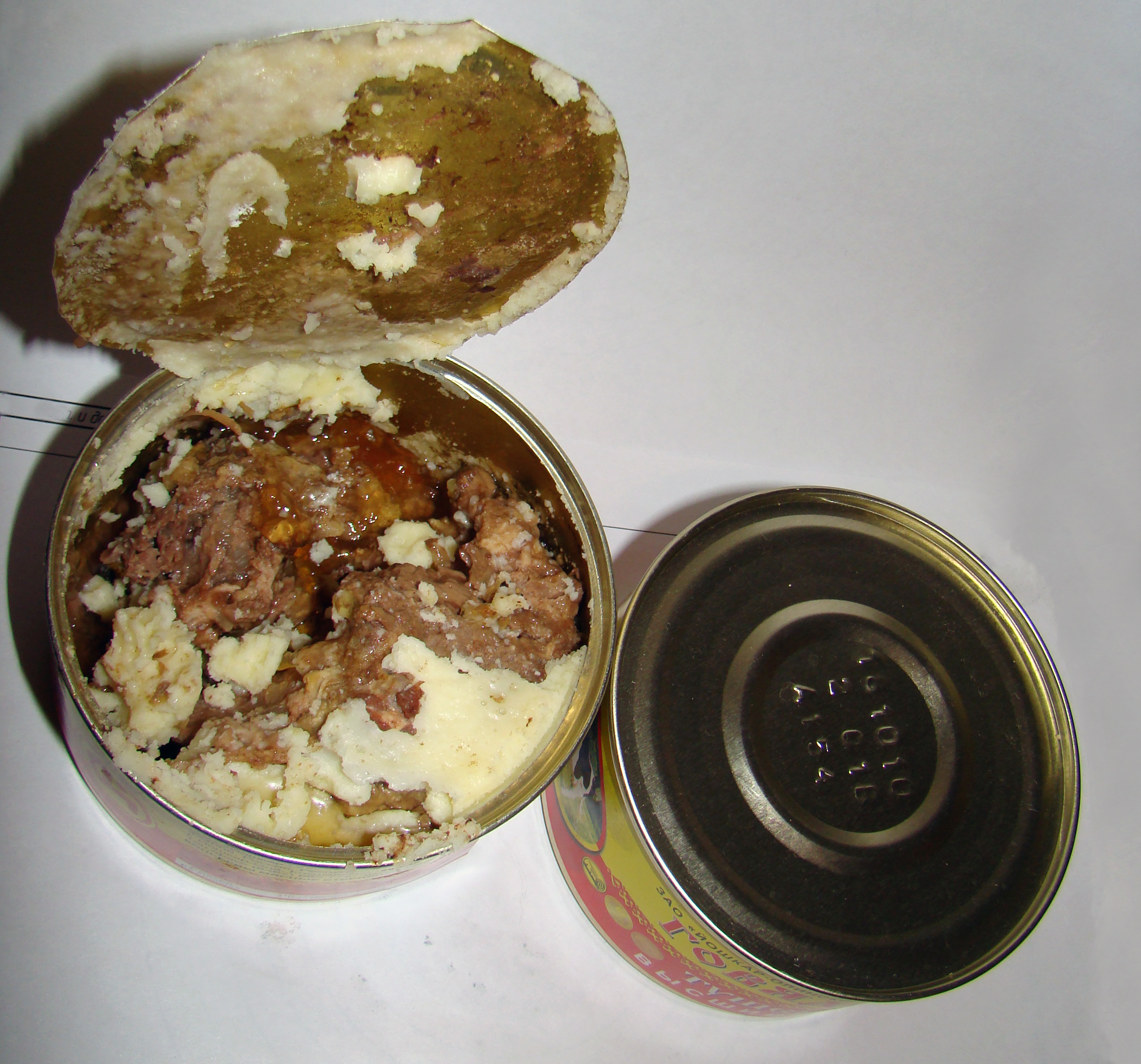
- Stewed beef, GOST 5284-84
- Type: Stew
- Place of origin: Russia

Tushonka (Russian: тушёнка, IPA: [tʊˈʂonkə], from тушение, 'braising') is a canned stewed meat especially popular in Russia and other countries of the former Eastern Bloc. It has become a common name for different kinds of canned stewed meat, not all of which correspond to the strict GOST standards.

Tushonka can be used and preserved in extreme situations, and therefore is a part of military food supplies in the CIS. For the people of the Soviet Union, tushonka was a part of military and tourist food supplies; at some extreme periods of time it could be bought only with food stamps.

Simple modern Russian recipes for tushonka include a variation of makarony po-flotski ("navy-style pasta"). It consists of pasta and any type of tushonka, mixed in 1:1 ratio.

== See also ==
- Hash
