= Macaroni and cheese =

Pasta dish

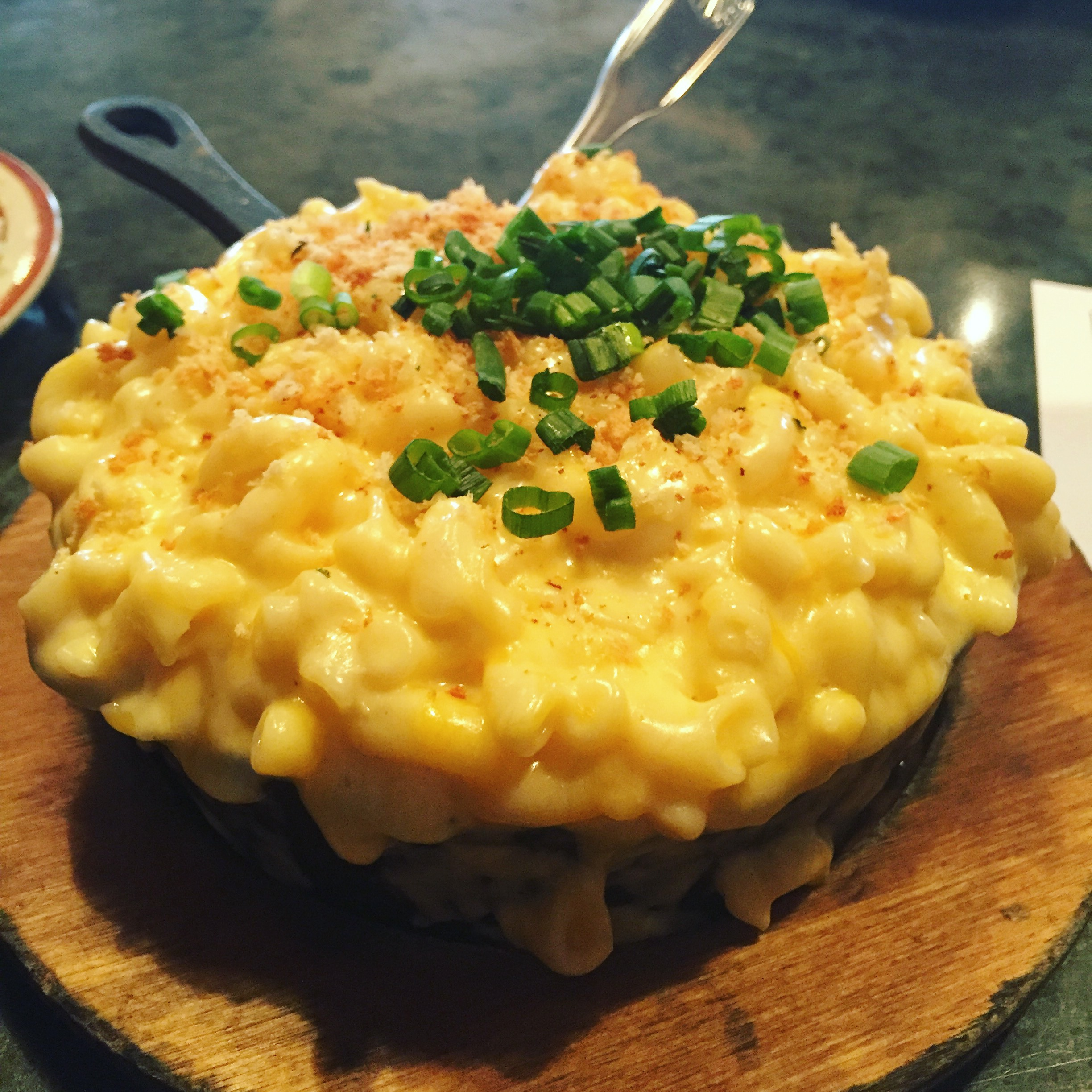
- Alternative names: Mac and cheese, macaroni cheese
- Course: Main or side dish
- Place of origin: England
- Serving temperature: Hot or warm
- Main ingredients: Macaroni, cheese, milk, butter

Macaroni and cheese (colloquially known as mac and cheese and known as macaroni cheese in the United Kingdom) is a pasta dish of macaroni covered in cheese sauce, most commonly cheddar sauce. Its origins trace back to cheese and pasta casseroles in medieval England. The traditional macaroni and cheese is put in a casserole dish and baked in the oven; however, it may be prepared in a saucepan on top of the stove, sometimes using a packaged mix such as became popular in the mid-20th century. The cheese is often included as a Mornay sauce added to the pasta. It has been described as "comfort food".

== History ==
A recipe for macaroni and cheese was included in Elizabeth Raffald's cookery book, The Experienced English Housekeeper (1769). Raffald's recipe is for a béchamel sauce which is mixed with macaroni, sprinkled with Parmesan, and baked until bubbly and golden.

To dress Macaroni with Permasent Cheese. Boil four Ounces of Macaroni 'till it be quite tender, and lay it on a Sieve to drain, then put it in a Tolling Pan, with about a Gill of good Cream, a Lump of Butter rolled in Flour, boil it five Minutes, pour it on a Plate, lay all over it Permasent Cheese toasted; send it to the Table on a Water Plate, for it soon goes cold.

Eliza Acton's cookery book Modern Cookery in All Its Branches (1845) has a recipe "Macaroni a la Reine", which directs the cook to "dissolve gently ten ounces of any rich, well-flavoured white cheese in full three quarters of a pint of good cream" with salt, Cayenne pepper, mace, and butter. The 1861 edition of Mrs. Beeton's Book of Household Management included two instances of "Macaroni, as usually served with the Cheese Course".

In the United Kingdom in the 21st century, the dish has risen in popularity, becoming widespread as a meal and as a side order in both fast food and upmarket restaurants.

=== Canada ===
Macaroni and cheese was brought to Canada by British immigrants, coming from other parts of the British Empire. Macaroni and cheese recipes have been attested in Canada since at least Modern Practical Cookery in 1845, which suggests a puff pastry lining (suggesting upper-class refinement); a sauce of cream, egg yolks, mace, and mustard; and grated Parmesan or Cheshire cheese on top. Canadian Cheddar cheese was also becoming popularized at this time and was likely also used during that era.

Macaroni and cheese is very popular in contemporary Canada. Kraft Dinner is the most popular brand of packaged macaroni and cheese. Sasha Chapman, writing in The Walrus, considered it to be Canada's national dish, ahead of poutine. In fact, Canadians purchase nearly 25% of the 7 million boxes of Kraft Dinner sold worldwide each week.

=== United States ===
One theory is that James Hemings brought the recipe to the United States after discovering it in France, prompted by Thomas Jefferson who was interested in extruded pasta. In 1802, Jefferson served "a pie called macaroni" at a state dinner. The menu of the dinner was reported by Reverend Manasseh Cutler, who apparently was not fond of the cheesy macaroni casserole.

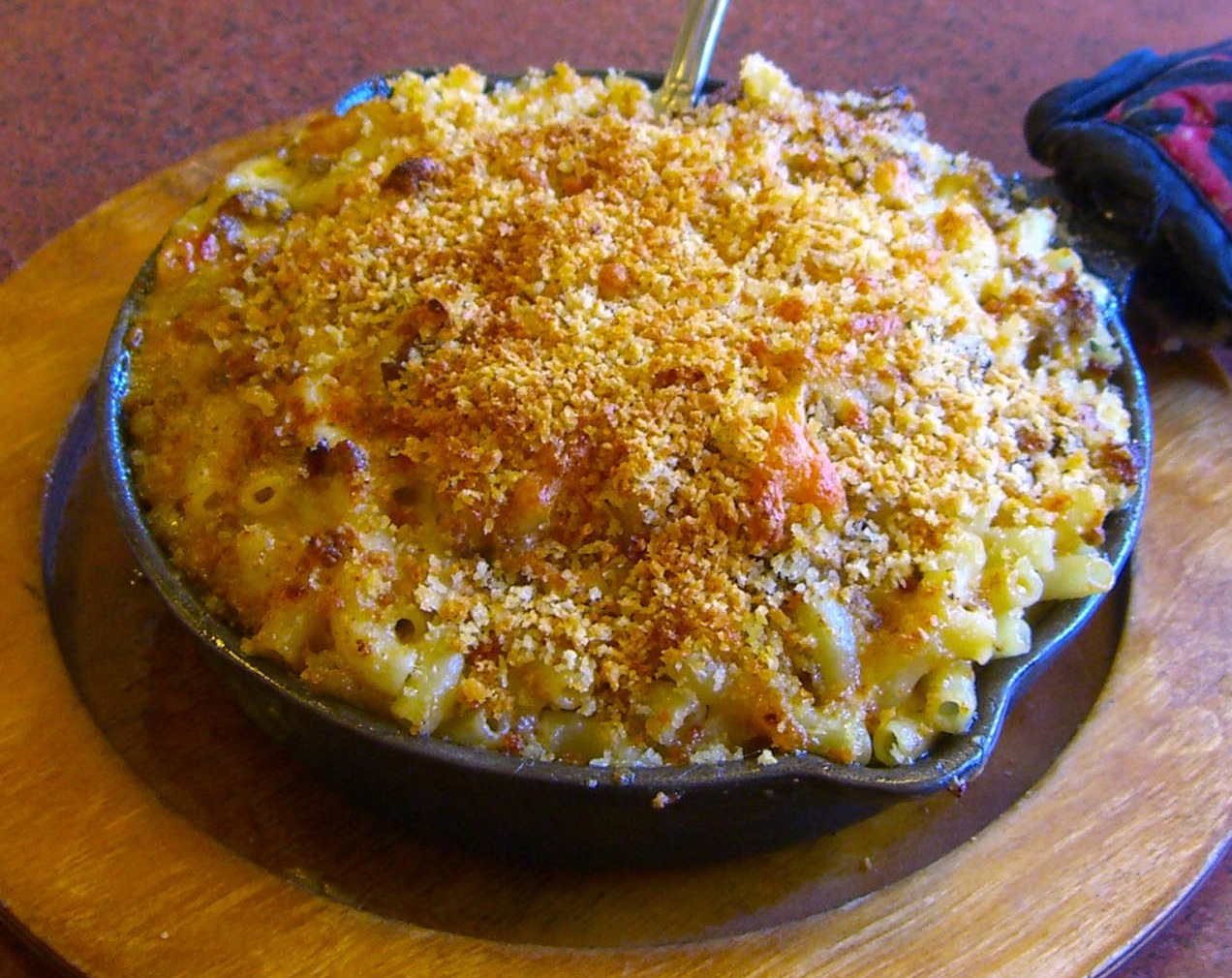
Baked macaroni and cheese

A recipe called "macaroni and cheese" appeared in the housekeeping manual and cookbook The Virginia House-Wife (1824) written by Mary Randolph. Randolph's recipe had three ingredients: macaroni, cheese, and butter, layered together and baked in a hot oven. The cookbook was the most influential cookbook of the 19th century, according to culinary historian Karen Hess. Similar recipes for macaroni and cheese occur in the 1852 Hand-book of Useful Arts, and the 1861 Godey's Lady's Book. By the mid-1880s, cookbooks as far west as Kansas and Festus, Missouri, included recipes for macaroni and cheese casseroles. Factory production of the main ingredients made the dish affordable, and recipes made it accessible, but not notably popular. As it became accessible to a broader section of society, macaroni and cheese lost its upper class appeal.

== Variations ==
While cheddar cheese is most commonly used for macaroni and cheese, other cheeses may also be used—usually sharp in flavour—and two or more cheeses can be combined. Other cheeses can be used such as Gruyère, Parmesan, Gouda, Havarti, and Jarlsberg cheese.

Macaroni and cheese can be made by simply layering slices of cheese and pasta (often with butter or evaporated milk) then baking in a casserole, rather than preparing as a cheese sauce.

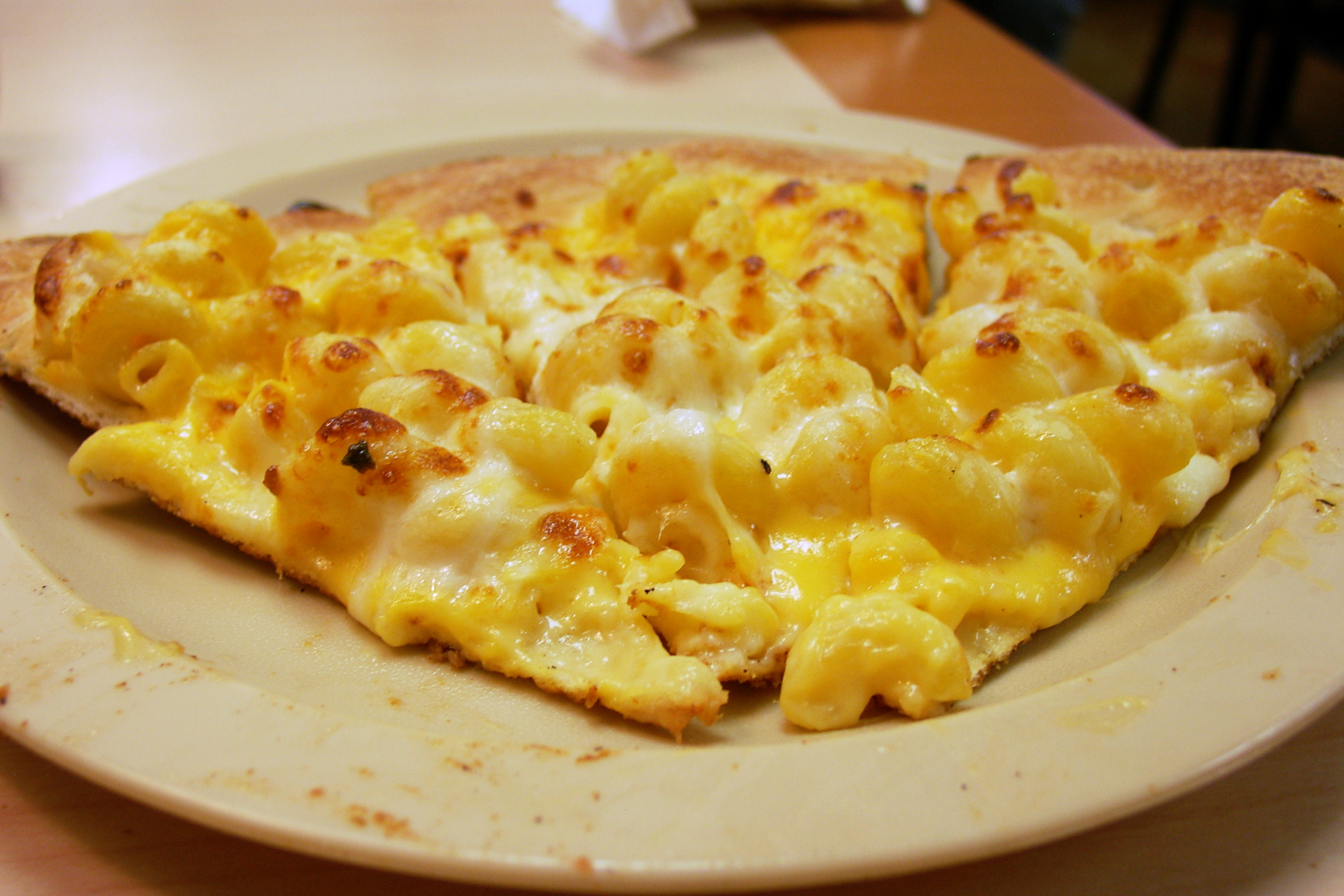
Macaroni and cheese pizza

One novelty presentation is deep-fried macaroni and cheese found at fairs and food carts.

=== Regional variations and analogues ===
In Scotland, macaroni and cheese can often be found in pies, known as a macaroni pie.

In 1731, the monastery of Disentis in Switzerland purchased a macaroni machine. Monasteries in the country were also known for cheesemaking. Though it is unknown when exactly it was invented, around the 19th century, the traditional dish in Switzerland called Älplermagronen (Alpine herder's macaroni) became popular. Älplermagronen are made of macaroni, cream, cheese, roasted onions, and in some recipes, potatoes. In the Canton of Uri, the potatoes are traditionally omitted, and in some regions, bacon or ham is added. The cheese is often Emmental cheese or Appenzeller cheese. It is usually accompanied by apple sauce.

== Prepared and packaged mixes ==
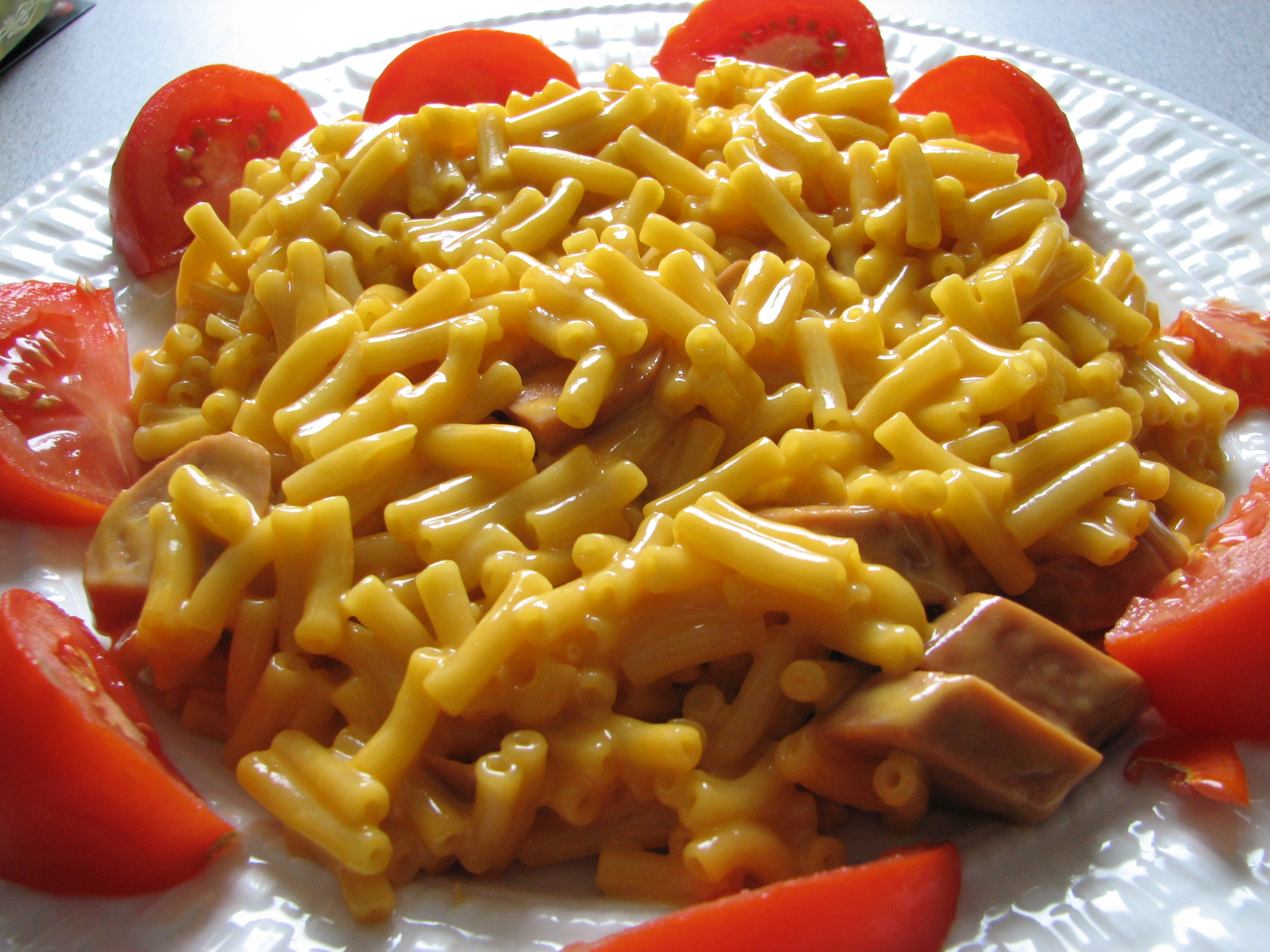
A plate of pre-packaged Kraft Mac & Cheese, served with tomato and sausage

The earliest known iteration of boxed macaroni and cheese came from a salesman in St. Louis, Missouri, named Grant Leslie. Leslie used rubber bands to attach processed cheese produced by Kraft Foods to boxes of pasta in an attempt to increase pasta sales. Kraft hired Leslie and began to produce Kraft Mac & Cheese (known as Kraft Dinner or KD in Canada) in 1937 with the slogan "make a meal for four in nine minutes". It was an immediate success in the US and Canada amidst the economic hardships of the Great Depression. During the Second World War, rationing led to increased popularity for the product, of which two boxes could be obtained for one food rationing stamp, or one box for 19 cents.

Packaged macaroni and cheese are now available in frozen form or as boxed ingredients for simplified preparation. Boston Market, Bellisio Foods, Kraft Foods, Cracker Barrel, and Stouffer's are some of the more recognizable brands of prepared and frozen macaroni and cheese available in the United States. Macaroni and cheese is also available canned and in microwavable containers. "Macaroni and cheese loaf", a deli meat which contains both macaroni and processed cheese bits, can be found in some stores. A variety of packaged mixes that are prepared in a saucepan on the stove or in a microwave oven are available. Some different products on the market use this basic formulation with minor variations in ingredients.

Although high in carbohydrates, calories, fat, and salt, macaroni and cheese is a source of protein and certain variations of the dish can decrease the negative health aspects.

== See also ==
- Chili mac
- Käsespätzle
- List of casserole dishes
- List of cheese dishes
- Macaroni casserole
- Macaroni pie
- Macaroni salad
