= Künefe peyniri =

Turkish cheese used in Künefe

- Region: Turkey
- Town: Hatay
- Source of milk: Goat, cow milk

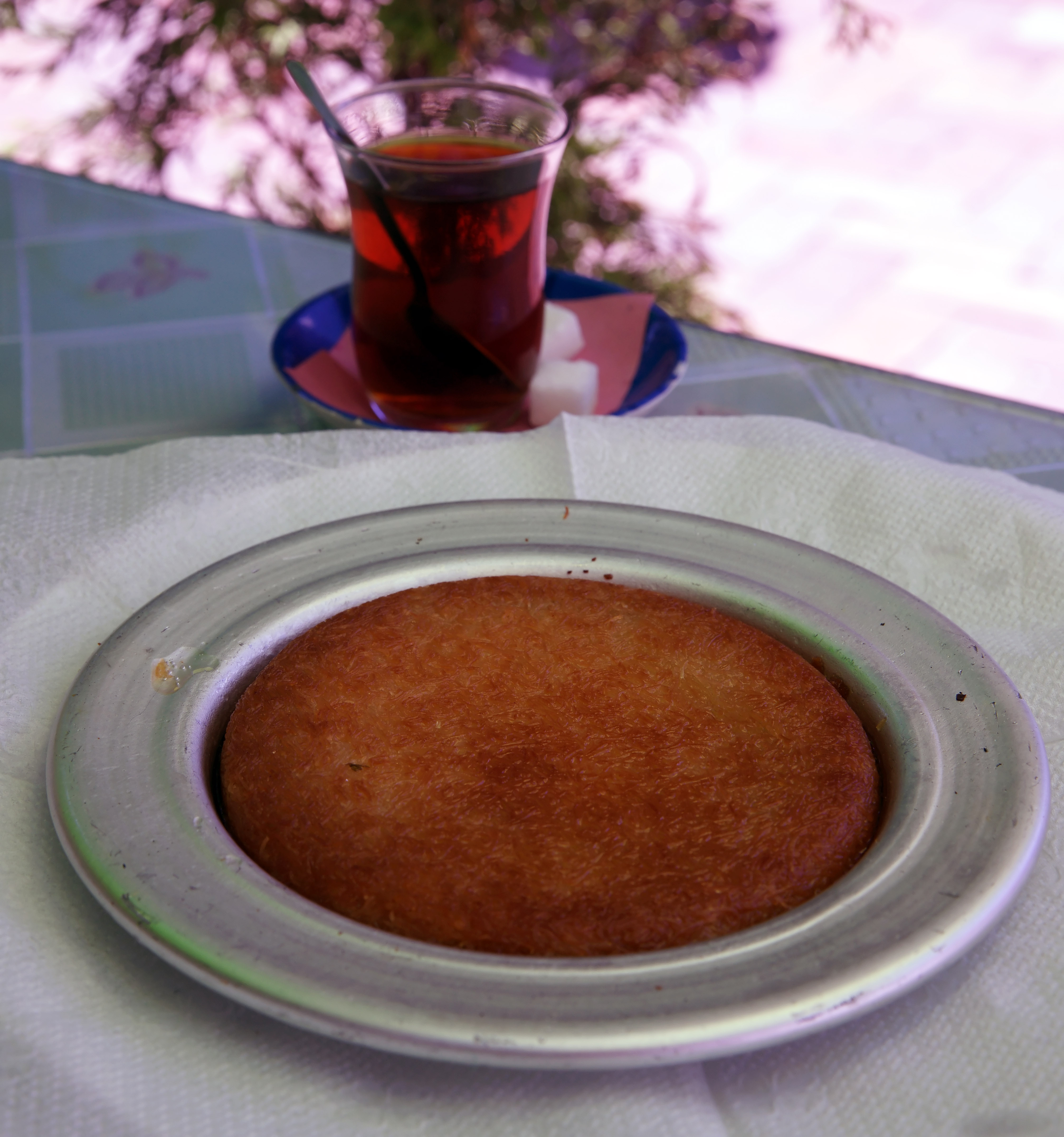
Turkish künefe and Turkish tea

Künefe peyniri (Turkish Künefe peyniri) a Turkish cheese made of cow milk, goat milk, or a combination, and used to prepare künefe.

== See also ==
- Turkish cuisine
