= Ground meat =

Meat that has been finely chopped by a grinder or knife

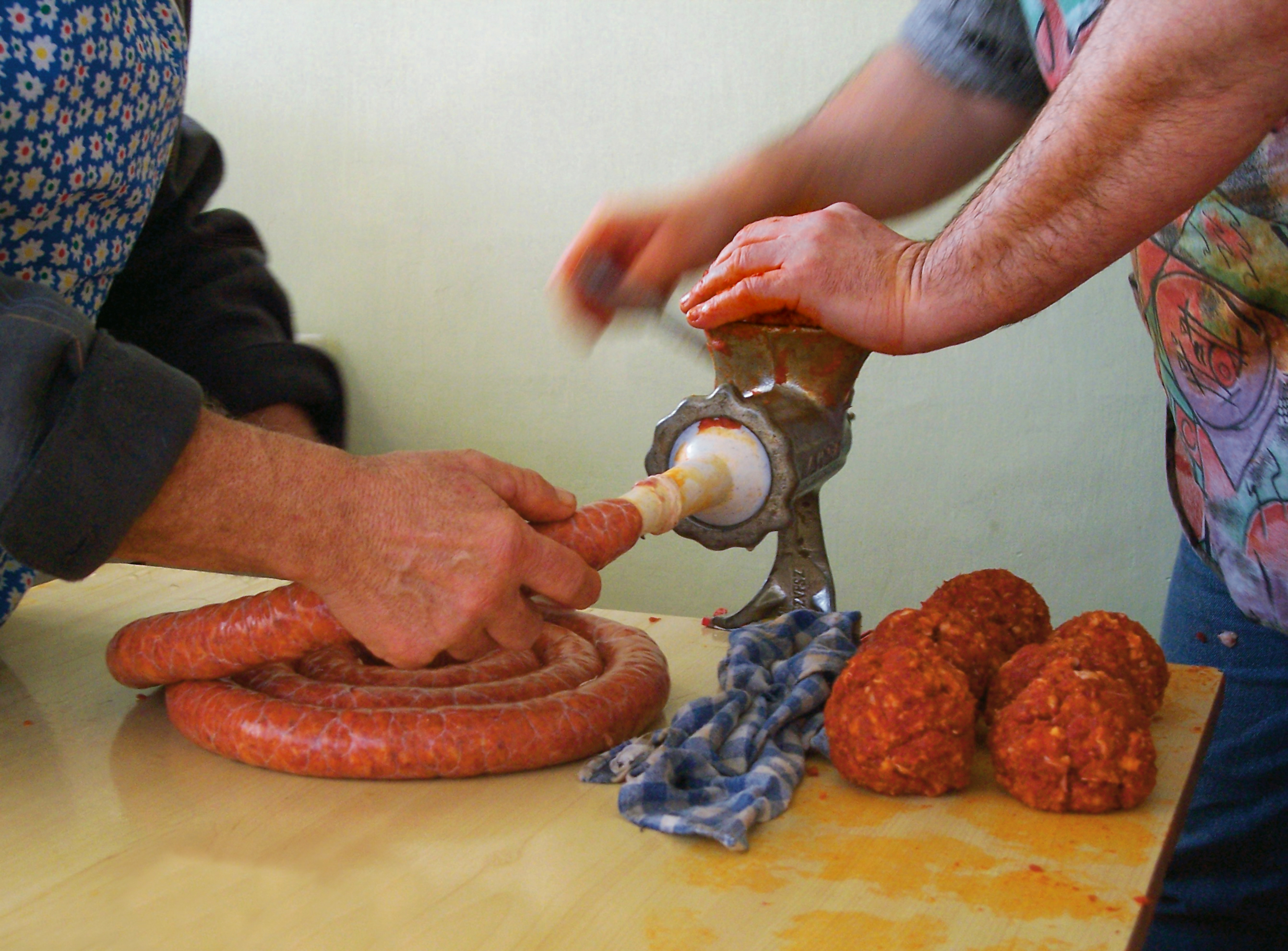
Ground meat in sausage making

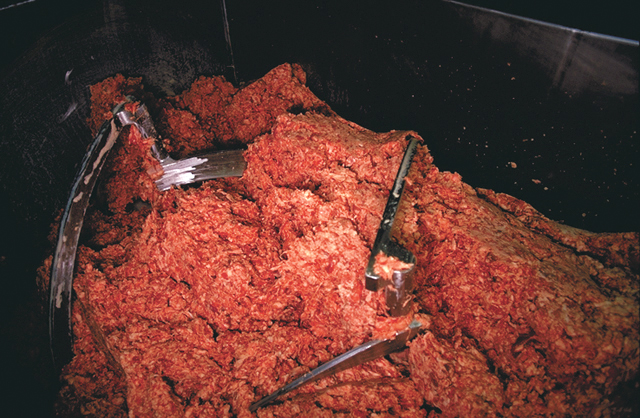
Ground beef in an industrial grinder

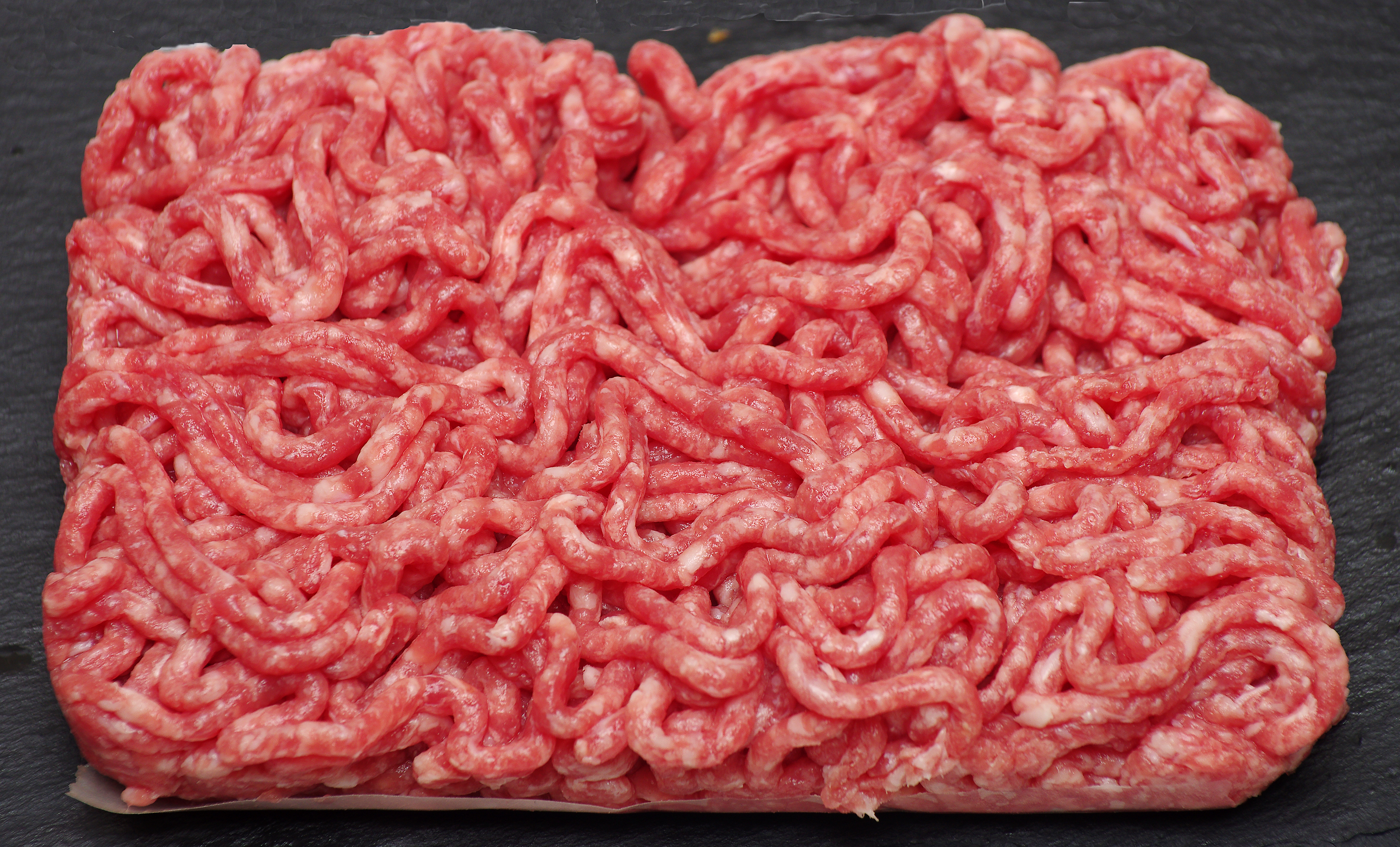
Ground meat in block

Ground meat, called mince or minced meat outside North America, is meat that has been cut into small pieces by a meat grinder or by chopping with a knife. A common type of ground meat is ground beef, but pork, veal, lamb, goat, poultry and mixtures of these are also ground. Ground meat is used in dishes such as meatballs, hamburgers and sausages. In the United States, ground beef makes up a large share of all beef consumed, and it is a traditional way of using trimmings from other cuts.

== History ==
Minced preparations appear in the Roman cookbook attributed to Apicius (compiled in late antiquity, probably the 4th or 5th century AD), which has a section on minced dishes called isicia. The meat was chopped fine and pounded in a mortar; the dishes could be made from meat, fish or shellfish, and include small patties wrapped in caul fat (isicia omentata), for which the recipe does not specify the animal. Many food historians trace the meatball to the Persian kofta; the dish was introduced to Arab cultures and spread from there to other regions. The English word kofta comes from Persian kūfta, "pounded".

In medieval and early modern England, mincemeat was a mixture of chopped meat, suet, dried fruit and spices used in pies. The meat was gradually dropped: mid-19th-century cookery writers such as Eliza Acton (1845) still gave recipes with ox tongue, while Mrs Beeton's Household Management (1861) originally gave both a meat and a meat-free recipe (later editions kept only the meat-free one), and by the 20th century only the suet usually remained.

Mechanical grinding is generally credited to the German inventor Karl Drais, whose inventions included a meat grinder in addition to his better-known bicycle precursor. The US National Park Service dates his grinder to the early 19th century and holds a hand-cranked iron grinder made by the Enterprise Manufacturing Company in 1886, reflecting how such devices were used in homes later in the century.

By the late 19th century, chopped beefsteak was known in the United States as "Hamburg steak", and American cookbooks often called such recipes "Beefsteak à la Hamburg". The physician James Henry Salisbury recommended broiled cakes of scraped lean beef for ill patients in his book The Relation of Alimentation and Disease (1888); as scraping was laborious, common recipes simply called for grinding the meat, and "Salisbury steak" became another name for a cooked ground-beef patty.

== Production ==
=== Sources of meat ===
Ground beef accounts for about 60% of the beef consumed in the United States. It has traditionally been a way of recovering value from trimmings left over from other cuts, and muscles from the chuck and round, which have low palatability as whole cuts, are routinely used as lean sources.

=== Grinding ===
In a grinder, meat is cut by rotating knives against perforated plates, and the size of the holes in the final plate determines the particle size of the product. In a controlled sensory study, patties made with smaller grinder plates were rated softer, more tender and finer in particle size, while patties made from re-ground product were rated as having more connective tissue and a larger particle size.

In the United States, processors typically combine fattier trimmings (commonly sold as "50s", about 50% lean) with leaner trimmings ("90s", about 90% lean) and with ground cuts such as chuck or round to reach specified lean-to-fat ratios, such as 80% lean.

== Dishes ==
Ground meat is used in a wide variety of dishes, by itself, or mixed with other ingredients. It may be formed into meatballs which are then fried, baked, steamed, or braised. They may be cooked on a skewer to produce dishes such as adana kebabı and ćevapi. It may be formed into patties which are then grilled or fried (hamburger), breaded and fried (menchi-katsu, Pozharsky cutlet), or braised (Salisbury steak). It may be formed into meatloaves or pâtés and baked. It may also be used as a filling or stuffing for meat pies such as shepherd's pie and böreks, and also as stuffing. It may be cooked and served as a hash or loosemeat. It may be made into meat sauce such as ragù, which in turn is used in dishes like pastitsio and moussaka, or mixed with sauce and served on a bun as a sloppy joe sandwich. It may also be cooked with beans, tomatoes, and/or spices to make chili con carne.

=== Fat content and labelling ===
In the United States, federal regulations define "ground beef" (or "chopped beef") as chopped fresh or frozen beef, without added beef fat, containing no more than 30% fat and no added water, phosphates, binders or extenders; "hamburger" has the same 30% fat limit but may include added beef fat. In the European Union, Regulation (EC) No 853/2004 defines minced meat as boned meat minced into fragments and containing less than 1% salt, and sets maximum fat and connective-tissue (collagen to meat-protein ratio) limits for four categories:

Category	Maximum fat	Maximum collagen/meat-protein ratio
Lean minced meat	7%	12%
Minced pure beef	20%	15%
Minced meat containing pork	30%	18%
Minced meat of other species	25%	15%

Minced meat sold in the UK must be labelled with its fat percentage and collagen ratio.

=== Use of trimmings and processing aids ===
Some ground beef in the United States has included "lean finely textured beef" (LFTB), made from fatty trimmings that are warmed, spun in a centrifuge to separate the fat, and then exposed to ammonium hydroxide gas to reduce bacteria. Federal regulators said the product met food safety standards, but in March 2012, after widespread public criticism in which the product was dubbed "pink slime", several supermarket chains dropped it, the USDA allowed school districts to opt out, and the largest producer, Beef Products Inc., suspended production at three of its four plants. The company said the criticism was misinformation.

== Culinary uses ==
=== Meatballs and related dishes ===
Meatballs have creation stories across the world, from Swedish köttbullar to Turkish köfte; Italy has its own polpette, which are typically smaller than the large meatballs served with spaghetti in the United States. The American dish of spaghetti and meatballs developed among Italian immigrants, about four million of whom arrived between 1880 and 1920, mostly from southern Italy. Other regional examples include Denmark's small pan-fried pork meatballs and China's "lion's head", a large, soft meatball of finely cut pork.

=== Sausages ===
Sausages are traditionally made of chopped or ground meat. According to the food writer Gary Allen, they arose to make use of every piece of meat and, with salting and smoking, to preserve it.

=== Plant-based substitutes ===
Companies such as Beyond Meat and Impossible Foods make plant-based products intended to taste more like traditional beef burgers than earlier vegetarian patties.

== Food safety ==
In an intact cut of meat, bacterial contamination is largely on the surface; grinding distributes surface bacteria throughout the product. Ground meat therefore needs to be cooked through rather than just seared. The Food Safety and Inspection Service advises cooking ground meats to an internal temperature of 160 °F (71 °C), and ground poultry to 165 °F (74 °C), measured with a food thermometer. Colour is not a reliable indicator: FSIS has found that cooked ground beef patties can look brown before they reach a safe temperature, and some lean ground beef stays pink at temperatures above 160 °F. The USDA recommends not eating or tasting raw or undercooked ground beef.

The 1993 Jack in the Box outbreak, in which undercooked hamburger patties contaminated with E. coli O157:H7 were served at 73 restaurants in the western United States, led to changes in United States food-safety regulation. In 1994 the FSIS declared E. coli O157:H7 an adulterant in raw ground beef, a change from its previous position that pathogens in raw meat were not adulterants.

== Fraud and labelling ==
Because ground meat is difficult to identify visually, it has been vulnerable to adulteration and mislabelling. In January 2013 the Food Safety Authority of Ireland reported that 10 of 27 beef burger products it tested contained horse DNA, mostly at very low levels, but with one product from Tesco containing about 29% horse meat relative to beef content; 23 of the 27 tested positive for pig DNA. The finding led to an EU-wide programme of testing beef products for horse DNA, in what became known as the 2013 horse meat scandal.

== Etymology ==
The word ultimately comes from the Turkic word qıyma meaning 'minced meat', and is thus related to the Persian qeyme, Turkish kıyma, and Greek kimás.

== See also ==
- Mincing
- Mechanically separated meat
