= Ground beef =

Beef that has been finely chopped

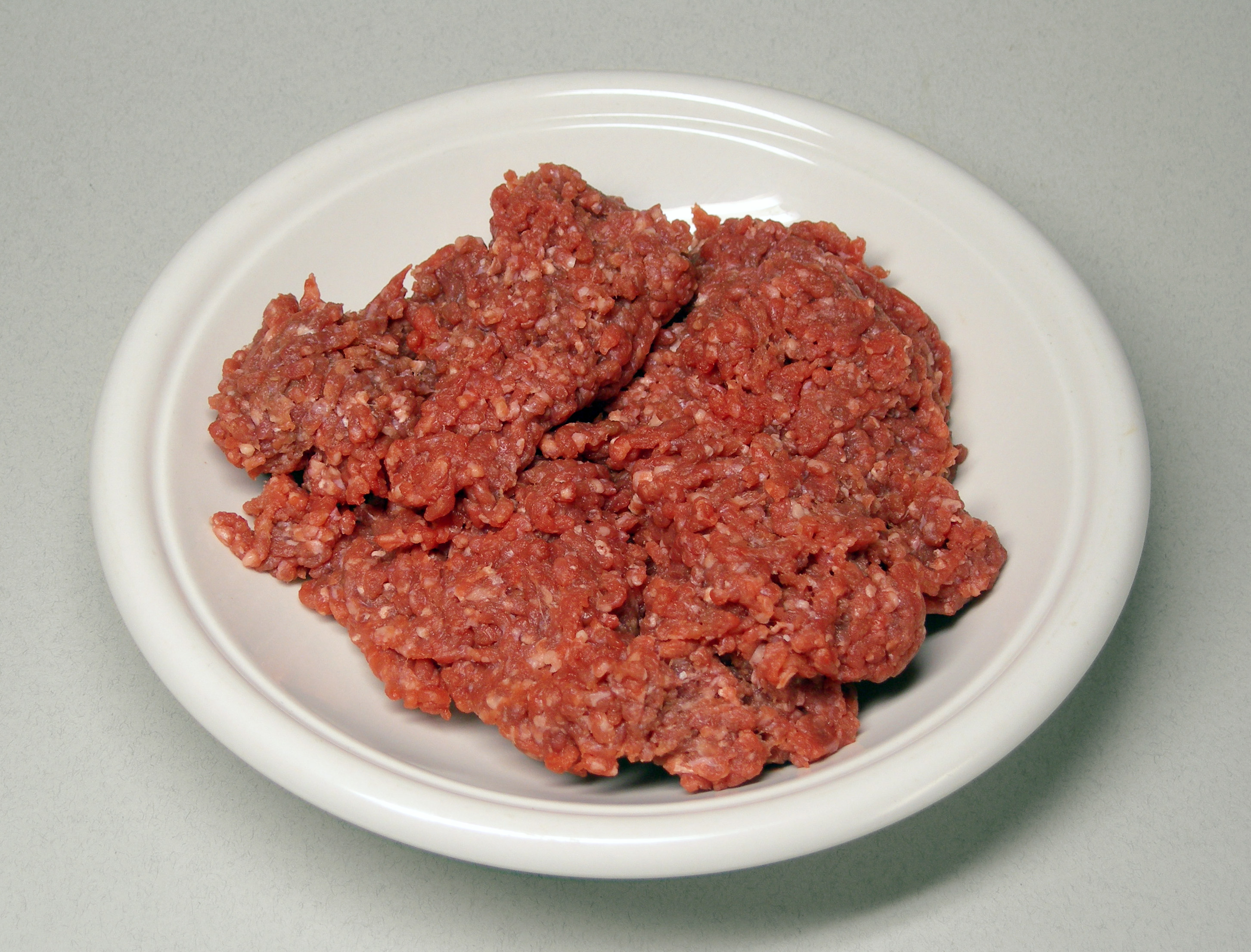
A plate of raw ground beef

Ground beef, hamburger meat (North American English), minced beef or beef mince (Commonwealth English; often just generically referred to as mince or mincemeat) is beef that has been finely chopped with a knife or meat grinder (North American), i.e., mincer or mincing machine (Commonwealth). It is used in many recipes including hamburgers, bolognese sauce, meatloaf, meatballs, kofta, and burritos.

"Mincemeat" may also refer to a mixture of chopped fruit, distilled spirits, and spices, with or without minced/ground meat, as found in mince pies.

== Contents ==
In many countries, food laws define specific categories of ground beef and what they can contain. For example, in the United States, beef fat may be added to hamburger but not to ground beef if the meat is ground and packaged at a USDA-inspected plant. (Note: These rules only apply to meat being sold across state lines. In the US, much ground beef is produced at local grocery stores and is not sold across state lines. In these cases, the laws of the local state apply; state laws may have different requirements.) In the US, a maximum of 30% fat by weight is allowed in either hamburger or ground beef. The allowable amount in France is 5 to 20% (15% being used by most food chains). In Germany, regular ground beef may contain up to 15% fat while the special "Tatar" for steak tartare must contain less than 5% fat. Both hamburger and ground beef can have added seasoning, phosphate, extenders, or binders added, but no additional water is permitted. Ground beef is often marketed in a range of different fat contents to match the preferences of customers.

Ground beef is generally made from less tender and less popular cuts of beef. Trimmings from tender cuts may also be used.

In a study in the US in 2008, eight brands of fast food hamburgers were evaluated for recognizable tissue types using morphological techniques that are commonly used in the evaluation of tissue's histological condition. The study of the eight laboratory specimens found the content of the hamburgers included:

- Water: 37.7% to 62.4% (mean, 49%)
- Muscle: 2.1% to 14.8% (median, 12.1%)
- Skeletal tissue: "Bone and cartilage, observed in some brands, were not expected; their presence may be related to the use of mechanical separation in the processing of the meat from the animal. Small amounts of bone and cartilage may have been detached during the separation process."
- Connective tissue
- Blood vessels
- Peripheral nerve tissue. Brain tissue was not detected in any of the samples.
- Adipose tissue—"The amount of lipid observed was considerable and was seen in both adipose tissue and as lipid droplets. Lipid content on oil-red-O staining was graded as 1+ (moderate) in 6 burgers and 2+ (marked) in 2 burgers."
- Plant material: "was likely added as a filler to give bulk to the burger"

=== "Pink slime" ===
Ground beef in the United States may contain a meat-based product used as a food additive produced using technology known as advanced meat recovery systems or alternatively by using the slime system. Meat processing methods used by companies such as Beef Products, Inc. (BPI) and Cargill Meat Solutions produce lean, finely textured beef product, otherwise known as "pink slime," from fatty beef trimmings. This meat-based product is then treated with antimicrobial agents to remove salmonella and other pathogens, and is included in a variety of ground beef products in the US. From 2001, the United States Department of Agriculture (USDA) has approved the product for limited human consumption. In a 2009 article by The New York Times, the safety of the beef processing method used by BPI was questioned. After the USDA's approval, this product became a component in ground beef used by McDonald's, Burger King and many other fast-food and grocery chains in the US.

In government and industry records in testing for the United States' school lunch program, pathogens such as E. coli and salmonella were found dozens of times in meat from BPI. Between 2005 and 2009, E. coli was found three times and salmonella 48 times. BPI had a rate of 36 positives for salmonella per 1,000 tests, compared to a rate of nine positives per 1,000 tests for other suppliers for the program. However, the program continued to source from BPI because its price was substantially lower than ordinary meat trimmings, saving about $1 million a year for the program. Cargill, among the largest hamburger makers in the US, is a large buyer of the meat-based product from BPI for its patties, according to the Times. Cargill suspended buying meat from two plants owned by BPI for several months in 2006 after excessive levels of salmonella were found.

== Categorization ==
Although any cut of beef can be used to produce ground beef, chuck steak is a popular choice because of its rich flavor and meat-to-fat ratio. Round steak is also often used. In the United States, ground beef is usually categorized based on the cut and fat percentage:

- Chuck: 78–84% lean
- Round: 85–89% lean
- Sirloin: 90–95% lean

== Culinary use ==
Ground beef is popular as a relatively cheap and quick-cooking form of beef. Some of its best-known uses are in hamburgers, sausages and cottage pie. It is an important ingredient in meatloaf, sloppy joes, meatballs, Hamburger Helper, burritos, and tacos, and also as a pizza topping. It can be used to make meat sauces, for example, lasagna and spaghetti bolognese in Italian cuisine. In the Middle East, it is used to make spicy kofta and meatballs. The Scottish dish mince and tatties uses it with mashed or boiled potatoes. In Lancashire, minced meat is a common filling for rag pudding. The Dutch slavink consists of ground meat (half beef, half pork) rolled in bacon.

Raw, lean, ground beef is used to make steak tartare, a French dish. More finely diced and differently seasoned, it is popular as a main course and as a dressing in Belgium, where it is known as filet américain ("American fillet").

== Food safety ==
Food safety of ground meat is problematic; bacterial contamination occurs frequently. Undercooked hamburgers contaminated with E. coli O157:H7 were responsible for four deaths in the U.S. in 1993, and hundreds of people fell ill. Ground beef must be cooked to 72 °C (160 °F) to ensure all bacterial contamination—whether it be endogenous to the product or contaminated after purchasing by the consumer—is killed. The color of cooked meat does not always indicate the beef has reached the required temperature; beef can brown before reaching 68 °C (155 °F).

To ensure the safety of food distributed through the National School Lunch Program, food banks, and other federal food and nutrition programs, the United States Department of Agriculture has established food safety and quality requirements for the ground beef it purchases. A 2010 National Research Council report reviewed the scientific basis of the Department's ground beef safety standards, compared the standards to those used by large retail and commercial food service purchasers of ground beef, and examined ways to establish periodic evaluations of the Federal Purchase Ground Beef Program. The report found that although the safety requirements could be strengthened using scientific concepts, the prevention of future outbreaks of foodborne diseases will depend on eliminating contamination during production and ensuring meat is properly cooked before it is served.

The 2013 horse meat scandal found traces of horse meat in many UK and European foods and ready meals that were mostly labelled as being minced/ground beef products.

== See also ==
- Ground meat
- Patty
- List of hamburgers
