= Evan Funke =

American chef

- Born: 1978 (age 47–48); Santa Monica, California
- Education: La Vecchia Scuola Bolognese
- Spouse: Grace Kim Funke
- Culinary career
- Current restaurants
- Felix Trattoria (Venice Beach); Mother Wolf (Hollywood, Las Vegas, and Miami); Funke (Beverly Hills); Tre Dita (Chicago)
- Previous restaurant
- Bucato (2013-2015)
- Television shows
- Chef's Table: Noodles (2024); Shape of Pasta (2020); Funke (2018)
- Website: evanfunke.com

Evan Funke (born 1978 in Los Angeles, California) is an American chef and pasta maker who is head chef and co-owner of a series of popular Italian restaurants across North America, including three in Los Angeles. He is a two-time James Beard nominee and has been described as Los Angeles' best pasta maker.

== Early life ==
Evan Alexander Funke was born in 1978 in Los Angeles, California. A native Angeleno, he is a sixth generation Californian and the third eldest child of special effects photographer Alex Funke and his wife Mary Emily Funke. Evan and his four siblings grew up in the Pacific Palisades. After graduating from Crespi Carmelite High School in Los Angeles, Funke attended Le Cordon Bleu College of Culinary Arts in Pasadena.

== Education ==
Funke studied at Le Cordon Bleu College of Culinary Arts in Pasadena but was recruited after six weeks by Wolfgang Puck, getting promoted until he became sous chef at Spago in Beverly Hills, California three years later. In 2008, Funke moved to Bologna to study pasta making in Italy, studying at La Vecchia Scuola Bolognese (VSB). He was trained under master sfoglina Alessandra Spisni, who became his mentor.

While in Italy, Funke ate pasta cacio e pepe three times a day for 23 days straight to "discover its true essence", and is credited as one of the driving factors behind the dish's popularity in the United States. He has rolled sfoglia over 35,000 times, mastering 155 different shapes.

After returning from Bologna, Funke worked at Rustic Canyon in Santa Monica where he was executive chef from 2008 to 2012.

== Career ==
From 2013 to 2015, Funke was chef at Bucato in Los Angeles, an Italian restaurant which served pasta made entirely by hand. Bucato closed in 2015.

In 2017, he opened Felix Trattoria in Venice, Los Angeles on Abbot Kinney in Venice, California, one of the best new restaurants in America.

He also is chef of Mother Wolf in Hollywood, Los Angeles which he debuted in early 2022. The restaurant features food inspired by dishes from Rome and the surrounding Lazio region of Italy. The restaurant quickly becomes a hotspot with a 1,500 person waitlist to be "one of the country’s most coveted culinary experiences".

In January 2023, Funke opened Funke in Beverly Hills which Beverly Hills Courier called as "the hottest ticket in town". The restaurant, described as a tri-level atelier, was named one of the top new restaurants by Los Angeles Magazine and is included in the Michelin Guide.

Mother Wolf expanded later in 2023, opening a location at the Fontainebleau Las Vegas in addition to its original Hollywood outpost. The restaurant is described as one of the best Italian restaurants in Las Vegas.

In March 2024, Funke opened a new Tuscan concept steakhouse restaurant and bar with 120 seats and sweeping views of Downtown Chicago at the St. Regis Chicago in collaboration with Lettuce Entertain You. In October, Mother Wolf added a location in Miami's Design District.

Following the January 2025 Southern California wildfires, Funke worked with World Central Kitchen in working to feed first responders and community members.

== Personal life ==
Funke and his wife Grace have been married since 2016. The couple resides in Los Angeles, California. They first met at Bucato.

== Popular culture ==
Funke is considered one of the 50 most powerful people in American fine dining. His restaurants are celebrity hotspots with numerous A-listers regularly spotted. Regulars include Jay-Z and Beyoncé, Michelle Obama, and Justin and Hailey Bieber. Other diners at Funke's restaurants have included Brad Pitt, Adele, LeBron James, David Grohl, Mark Wahlberg, Chrissy Teigen, Vanessa Hudgens, Jennifer Aniston, Courteney Cox, Matt Damon, Robert De Niro, Paul McCartney, Giada de Laurentis, Meghan Markle, Kris Jenner, and Jeffrey Katzenberg.

Since 2022, Funke has been the official chef of the Vanity Fair Oscar Party. Starting with the 32nd edition, he is also executive chef of the SAG Awards.

In 2024, he was the chef for the reopening party of Loro Piana's Rodeo Drive flagship.

=== Television & Film Appearances ===
==== Chef's Table: Noodles (2024) ====
Funke is the subject of episode 1 of the Netflix show, Chef's Table: Noodles, released on October 2, 2024.

==== Shape of Pasta (2020) ====
He previously was the host of a show on Quibi, Shape of Pasta, in which he scoured the Italian countryside in search of unique pastas with geographical significance which he learned from sfoglini. He has described the show as part of his "life's work" to document and preserve traditions of pasta before they become extinct.

==== Funke (2018) ====
He was the subject of a full length documentary, Funke, in 2018 which captured his "obsessive journey to mastering the pasta craft".

==== Interviews and guest appearances ====
| Year | Title | Role | Note | Reference |
|---|---|---|---|---|
| 2002 | Plateworthy | Himself | Interviewed by Nyesha Arrington | |
| 2020 | Top Chef: All-Stars Los Angeles | Guest Judge | Season 17, Episode 13: "Parma" | |
| 2021 | Wolfgang | Himself | Relationship with Wolfgang Puck | |
| 2022 | Alex vs. America | Guest Judge | Season 1, Episode 5: "Alex vs. Noodles" | |
| 2023 | Hell's Kitchen | Guest Judge | Season 22, Episode 10: "The Pastabilities Are Endless" | |

=== Publications ===
American Sfoglino: A Master Class in Handmade Pasta. San Francisco: Chronicle Books. 2019. ISBN 9781452173313. It won the 2020 James Beard Foundation Award for Best Photography.
