= Sfoglia (restaurant) =

Restaurant in New York City

- Interactive map of Sfoglia

Restaurant information
- Established: 2000
- Head chef: Originally: Ron Suhanosky Currently: Melisa Panchano
- Food type: Pasta
- Location: 1402 Lexington Ave, New York City, New York, United States
- Coordinates: 40°47′01″N 73°57′10″W
- Website: www.sfogliarestaurant.com

Sfoglia is an Italian restaurant located on the Upper East Side of Manhattan in New York City. The restaurant has a total of ten tables and is located on the corner of 92nd Street and Lexington Avenue. It has a "rustic" and "trattorian" style according to The New Yorker. The name is for sfoglia, the sheets from which hand made Italian fresh pasta is made in the tradition of Emilia-Romagna. It was founded by Ron Suhanosky, the original head chef and a founding co-owner.

== History ==
Sfoglia was first opened by chef Ron Suhanosky with his wife Colleen, the pastry chef, in Nantucket in 2000. The Upper East Side location opened in 2007. Following its opening, The New York Times wrote it had "amassed a sizeable following" and for the devotees it was "a religion, not just a restaurant."

The restaurant launched a new logo designed by Louise Fili when it opened its new New York City location better to represent its "intimate and rustic" quality. The new logo represented the two islands (Nantucket and Manhattan) as two mermaids with their airport codes (ACK and NYC) utilizing a gold leaf setting inspired by the Suhanosky's interest in heraldry.

In 2010, Suhanosky and his wife split with the restaurant due to "differences". They went on to open another restaurant in New York and another in Boston.

It is popular with many celebrities. In 2011, Phoebe Cates described the restaurant as her "home away from home" in New York. Tom Cruise and Jerry Seinfeld have also eaten here.

== Reviews ==
In the Los Angeles Times, Sfoglia was reviewed in 2009 as a restaurant "that always reminds me of having lunch with a best friend. It's Sfoglia, with its wood floors, carefully mismatched tables and chairs, and gauzy curtains. Hanging from the ceiling is a pretty glass chandelier and hanging on a wall is an Italian pasta chart. It might be cold outside, but it's warm inside where the crunchy crusted bread is baked fresh." In a review in 2007, The New York Times wrote "You'll get in, but only if you plan a month ahead, and only if you're O.K. with eating before 6:30 or after 9:30. Since Sfoglia opened a year ago, it has amassed a sizeable following, and for these devotees it's not just a restaurant. It's a religion."
