= Macarona bil-bechamel =

Egyptian pasta bake with béchamel and a meat sauce

Macarona bil-bechamel مكرونة بالبشاميل
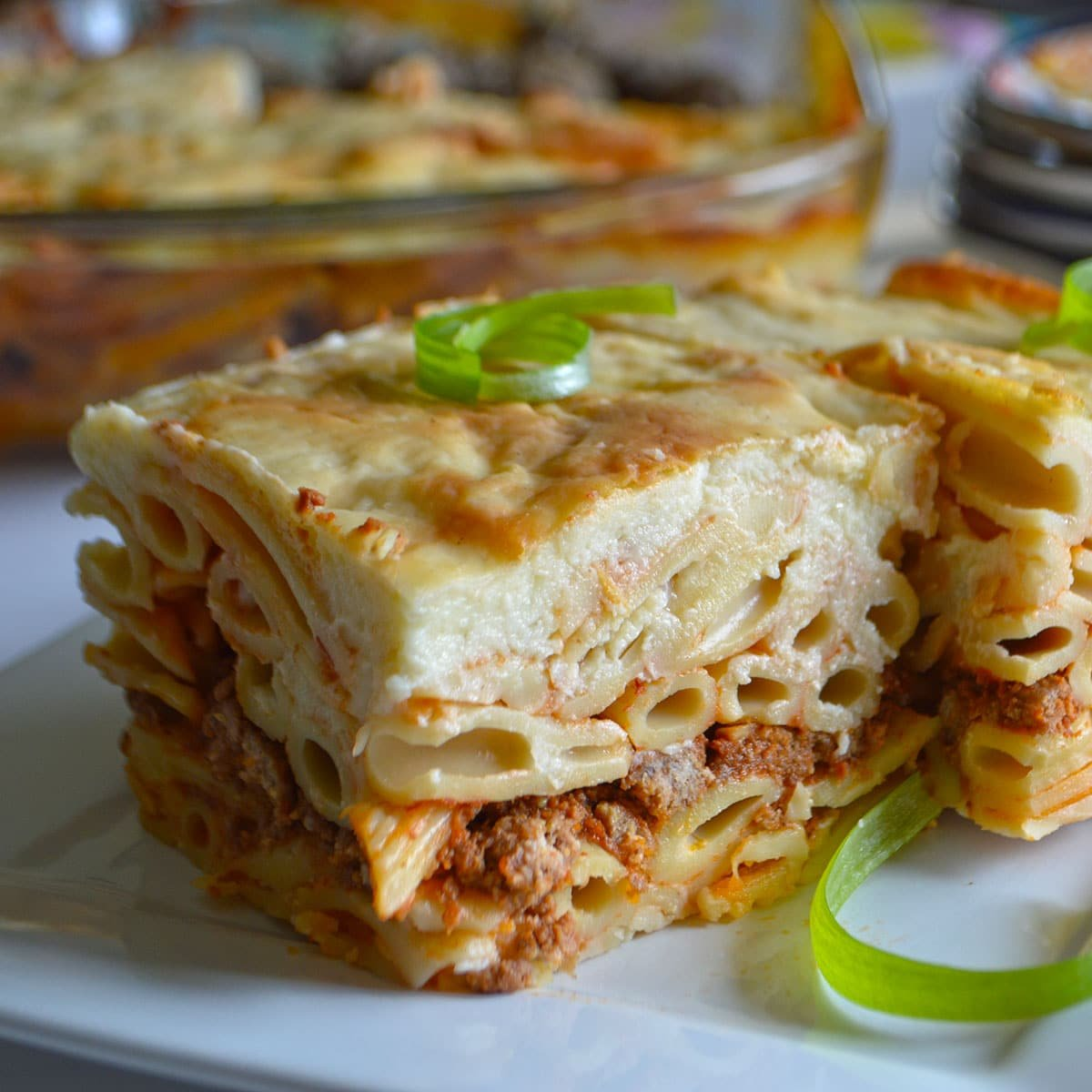
- Place of origin: Greece
- Main ingredients: Penne pasta, minced meat and bechamel
- Similar dishes: Pastitsio, lasagne

Macarona bil-bechamel (Egyptian Arabic: مكرونة بالبشاميل) is a traditional Egyptian pasta bake that combines penne pasta, a spiced meat sauce, and creamy béchamel sauce. Some versions involve a top layer of cheese. This casserole is reminiscent of Italian lasagna and Greek pastitsio, likely an influence from the latter during the early 20th century, when a significant Greek community resided in Egypt.

== History ==
Macarona bil-bechamel, a popular Egyptian dish, traces its origins to French-trained chefs who worked in khedival palace kitchens and luxury hotels in the mid-19th century. These chefs introduced European culinary techniques, which were later adopted by Egyptian cooks. By the early 20th century, Greek-owned restaurants in Cairo and Alexandria played a significant role in popularizing dishes like pastitsio, the Greek predecessor to macarona bil-bechamel. Egyptian chefs adapted the dish, replacing its traditional spicing with the béchamel sauce, a technique influenced by French cuisine. This transformation was cemented in Egyptian home cooking through cookbooks such as Kitab Abla Nazira, which standardized the dish and made it a staple of Egyptian households. Rather than a direct European import, macarona bil-bechamel represents the fusion of Mediterranean culinary traditions, evolving within Egypt’s dynamic food culture.

== Preparation ==
The preparation of macarona bil-bechamel involves three main components: pasta, meat sauce, and béchamel sauce. Penne pasta is typically used, cooked until al dente, drained, and set aside.

The meat sauce is prepared by sautéing diced onions and minced garlic in butter until softened and fragrant. Ground beef is then added and cooked until browned. Tomato sauce is incorporated, and the mixture is seasoned with salt, black pepper, and thyme. This sauce is simmered briefly to allow the flavors to meld.

The béchamel sauce is made by creating a roux from equal parts butter and flour, cooked until golden. Gradually, milk is whisked in to achieve a smooth, creamy consistency. Seasonings such as salt, white pepper, and ground nutmeg are added to enhance the flavor.

To assemble the dish, a layer of cooked pasta is placed in a baking dish, followed by the meat sauce, and topped with another layer of pasta. The béchamel sauce is poured over the top, and for added richness, shredded mozzarella cheese can be sprinkled before baking. The casserole is baked in an oven until it is golden brown.

== See also ==
- Egyptian cuisine
- List of Middle Eastern dishes
- List of African dishes
