= Louis de Béchameil, Marquis of Nointel =

French financier and patron of the arts

Louis de Béchameil, marquis de Nointel (1630–1703) was a French financier and patron of the arts.

== Life ==
Son of Jean-Baptiste Béchameil, Louis was a rich tax farmer and superintendent to the house of the Duke of Orléans; he was intendant of Brittany and of the généralité of Tours. In 1697, Béchameil bought the marquisat of Nointel and later became Louis XIV's head steward.

Following a reorganisation of the Brittany kingdom's Chamber of Accounts of 1669, a commission (1680) was set up and led by Béchameil de Nointel, as an intendant where he wrote a report to attest what he saw. This document, which mentions the frauds of the Chamber's deposits, shows the favors given to the crown and tries to end such abuses, led to a new law proposed by Charles Colbert to the Brittany Chamber in 1681. In 1698, Béchameil published another document focusing on the fiscal system.

Béchameil was an art lover who was directed by the King to found the academy at Angers, for which he delivered the opening address and served as director. He was a patron of Watteau, who painted a series of arabesque panels with figures for the hôtel de Nointel, Paris, doubtless, from the nature of the allegories, for a small dining chamber.

Béchameil and his wife, Marie Colbert (d. April 3, 1686) had two children, Marie Louise Béchameil de Nointel (1661 – April 2, 1740) and Louis Béchameil de Nointel (1649 – December 31, 1718).

== Béchamel sauce ==
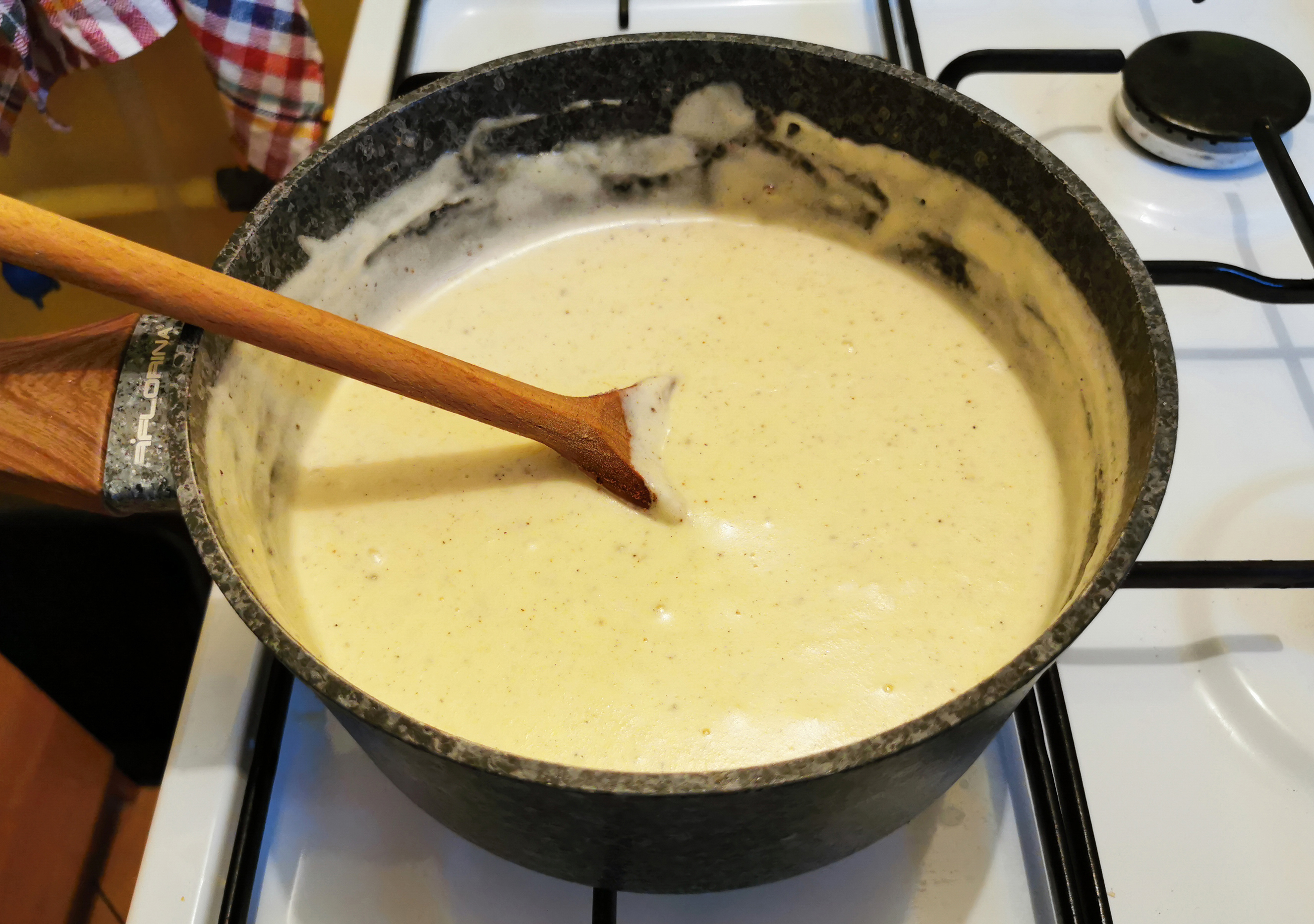
Béchamel sauce

The white sauce called béchamel sauce (Fr. sauce béchamel) acquired its name from him for he perfected an older sauce made from cream originally made by François Pierre de la Varenne (1615–1678), the cook of the marquis d'Uxelles. The sauce was dedicated to Béchameil to flatter him, at which the Duke of Escars commented:

"That fellow Béchameil has all the luck! I was serving breast of chicken à la crème more than 20 years before he was born, but I have never had the chance of giving my name to even the most modest sauce."

(« Est-il heureux, ce petit Béchameil ! J’avais fait servir des émincés de blancs de volaille à la crème plus de vingt ans avant qu’il fût au monde et, voyez, pourtant je n’ai jamais eu le bonheur de pouvoir donner mon nom à la plus petite sauce! »)
