= Rântaș =

Hungarian and Romanian sauce based on oil and fried flour

Rântaș (Hungarian: rántás) is a Hungarian and Romanian thickener (similar to Roux) based on lard or vegetable fat and fried flour. If chopped onions are added, the recipe is called rântaș de ceapa (Romanian) or hagymás rántás (Hungarian). This thickener is a component of certain ciorba and the sarmale.

In Hungary, it is commonly used as a basis for different soups and purées or so vegetable stews (főzelék), often with chopped onions and/or garlic and occasionally whole caraway seeds, especially for the soups called rántott leves and tojásleves ("egg soup"). Ground paprika may also be added, but only after the onions get translucent and the flour is already fried (i.e. light brown), because the paprika gets bitter if fried for a long time. A well-known rule calls for mixing cold water into the hot rántás so the fried flour particles spread evenly. A common oil-to-flour ratio is 1–2, as in 1 tbsp oil to 2 tbsp flour. White flour works best as whole wheat flour's larger grains can prevent even spreading.

Based on the color the flour becomes from the length of frying there will be distinguished between white-, light-, blond- and brown rántás.

== See also ==
- roux (flour/fat mixture)
