= Lasagna =

Flat pasta and stacked pasta dishes

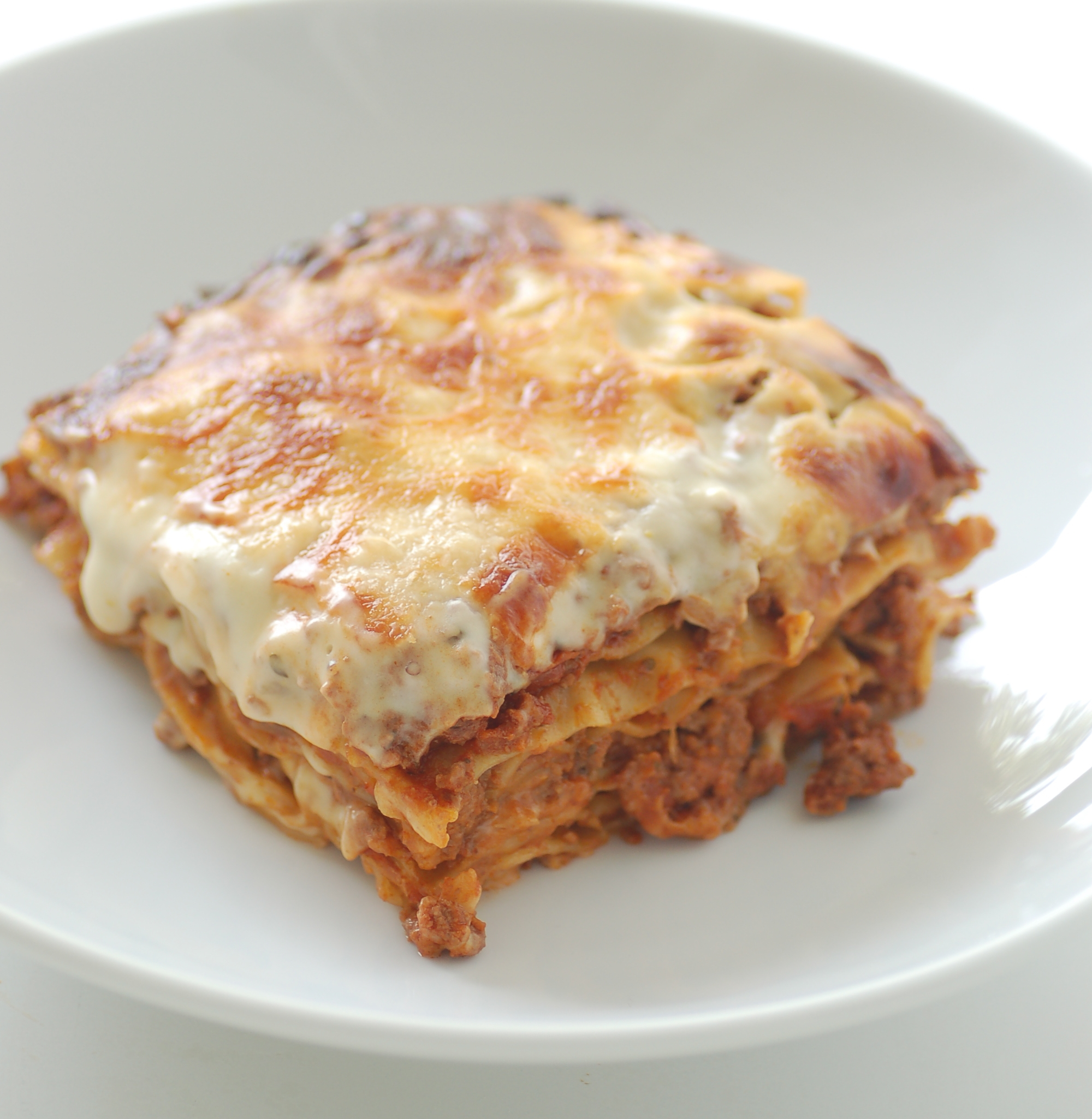
- Type: Pasta al forno
- Course: Main course
- Place of origin: Italy
- Associated cuisine: Italian cuisine
- Main ingredients: Lasagne sheets, ragù

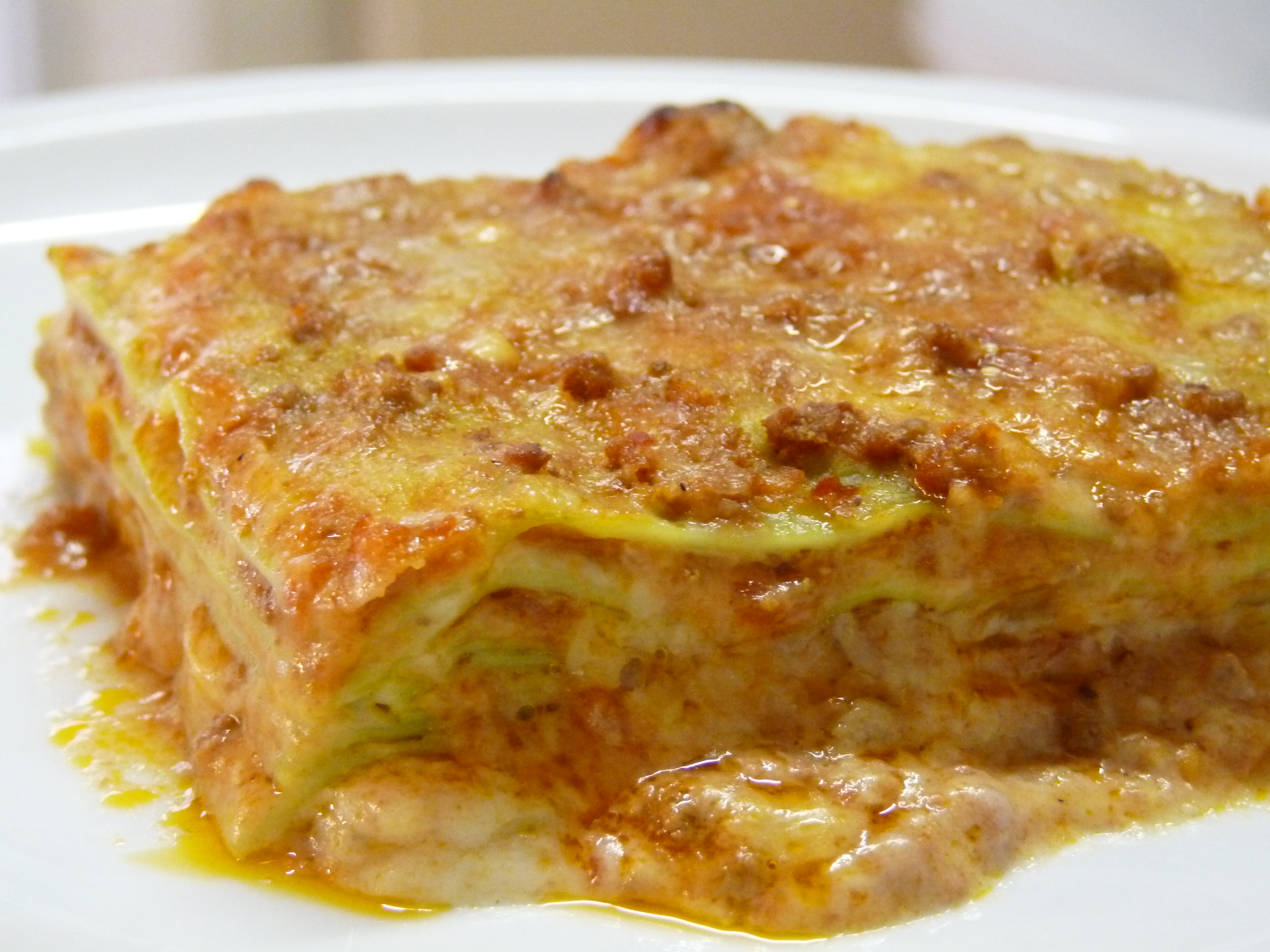
Lasagne alla bolognese

Lasagna, also known by the plural form lasagne, is a type of pasta made in wide, flat sheets. It originates in Italian cuisine, where it is served in a number of ways, but is most often served as a casserole made by stacked layers of pasta, alternating with fillings that could consist of meat, dairy, vegetables, and sauces. Typically, cooked pasta is assembled with the aforementioned fillings, topped with grated cheese, and then baked in an oven (al forno). Regional variations of this are found across Italy, along with Americanized versions worldwide.

== Name ==
As with most other types of pasta, the Italian word is a plural form: lasagne (Italian: [laˈzaɲɲe]) meaning more than one sheet of lasagna (UK: /ləˈzænjə/, US: /ləˈzɑːnjə/; Italian: [laˈzaɲɲa]). When referring to the baked dish, regional usage in Italy favours the plural form lasagne in the north of the country and the singular lasagna in the south. The former plural usage has influenced the usual spelling found in British English, while the southern Italian singular usage has influenced the spelling often used in American English. Both lasagna and lasagne are used as singular non-count (uncountable) nouns in English.

=== Etymology ===
In ancient Rome, there was a dish similar to a traditional lasagna called lasana or lasanum (Latin for 'container' or 'pot') described in the book De re coquinaria by Marcus Gavius Apicius, but the word could have a more ancient origin. The first theory is that lasagna comes from Greek λάγανον (laganon), a flat sheet of pasta dough cut into strips. The word λαγάνα (lagana) is still used in Greek to mean a flat thin type of unleavened bread baked for the Clean Monday holiday.

Another theory is that the word lasagna comes from the Greek λάσανα (lasana) or λάσανον (lasanon) meaning 'trivet', 'stand for a pot' or 'chamber pot'. The Romans borrowed the word as lasanum, meaning 'cooking pot'.

Another proposed link or reference is the 14th-century English dish loseyn as described in The Forme of Cury, a cookbook prepared by "the chief Master Cooks of King Richard II", which included English recipes as well as dishes influenced by Spanish, French, Italian, and Arab cuisines. This dish has similarities to modern lasagna in both its recipe, which features a layering of ingredients between pasta sheets, and its name. An important difference is the lack of tomatoes, which did not arrive in Europe until after Columbus reached the Americas in 1492. The earliest discussion of the tomato in European literature appeared in a herbal written in 1544 by Pietro Andrea Mattioli, while the earliest cookbook found with tomato recipes was published in Naples in 1692, but the author had obtained these recipes from Spanish sources.

== Origins and history ==
Lasagna originated in Italy during the Middle Ages. The oldest known written reference to lasagna appears in 1282, in a ballad transcribed by a Bolognese notary, "Pur bii del vin, comadre, e no lo temperare" ('Just drink some wine, my woman, and do not dilute it'), part of the Memoriali Bolognesi (lit. 'Bolognese Memorials'):

Italian

Giernosen le comadre trambedue a la festa,
de gliocch'e de lasagne se fén sette menestra

— Rime dei memoriali bolognesi on the IntraText Digital Library
Translation:
English

Both women went to the festival,
and had seven portions of gnocchi and lasagne

— Zancani (2010), p. 146

From a similar time, Salimbene di Adam's Cronica contains a 1284 reference to lagana cum caseo (lit. 'lasagna with cheese'). As was typical of pasta dishes, lasagna was relatively expensive.

The first recorded recipe was set down in the early 14th century in the Liber de Coquina (The Book of Cookery). It bore only a slight resemblance to the later traditional form of lasagna, featuring a fermented dough flattened into thin sheets, boiled, sprinkled with cheese and spices, and then eaten with a small pointed stick. Recipes written in the century following the Liber de Coquina recommended boiling the pasta in chicken broth and dressing it with cheese and chicken fat. In a recipe adapted for the Lenten fast, walnuts were recommended.

== Variations ==
=== Pasta ===
Mass-produced lasagne with a ruffled edge is called lasagna riccia, doppio festone, sciabò, and sciablò. In recent times, lasagne used in the baked dish have tended to be of a long, narrow rectangular shape called lasagna a nastro, although a more traditional square shape is still found.

In Veneto, factory-produced lasagne are called bardele or lasagnoni. Narrower lasagne are mezze lasagne, and if with a ruffled edge, mezze lasagne ricche. Similar pastas are the narrower lasagnette and its longer cousin, the lasagnotte (cappellasci [sic] in Liguria), as well as the sagne of Salento (the "heel" of the Italian "boot"), and lagana in the remainder of Apulia.

=== Dish ===
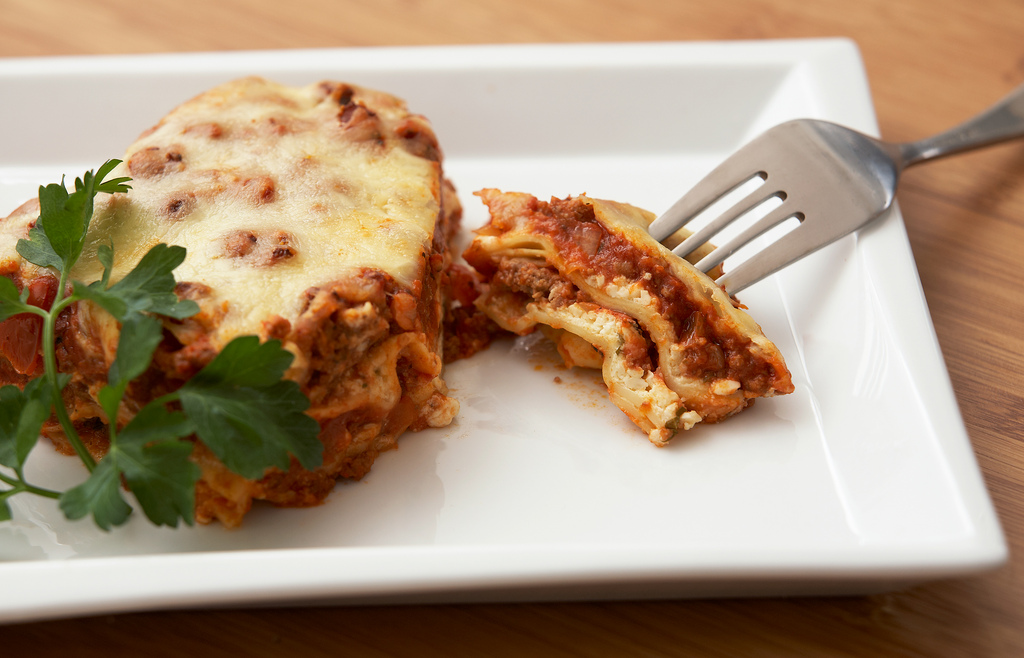
Lasagne al forno

There are many regional variations of the dish in Italy; these were often traditionally served during religious celebrations, which were some of the few times in the year that many people would eat meat. The lasagna of Naples, lasagne di Carnevale, is layered with local sausage, small fried meatballs, hard-boiled eggs, ricotta and mozzarella cheeses, and sauced with Neapolitan ragù, a meat sauce. The dish is eaten at Carnival, and is not held in high esteem locally; food writer Arthur Schwartz details that "almost without fail", Neapolitans tell visitors "the really good lasagne is from Bologna". Italian-American recipes show an influence of Neapolitan lasagna, often using ricotta cheese in place of béchamel sauce found in northern Italian recipes. Another southern Italian recipe, lasagne alla pugliese, is also associated with a religious festival, in this case Christmas: it uses a capon broth in place of ragù, and is layered with veal meatballs, mozzarella, prosciutto, and Parmesan.

Lasagne al forno, layered with a thick ragù and béchamel and corresponding to the most common version of the dish outside Italy, is traditionally associated with the Emilia-Romagna region of Italy. In its capital, Bologna, lasagne alla bolognese is layered with ragù (a thick sauce made with onions, carrots, celery, finely ground pork and beef, butter, and tomatoes), béchamel sauce, and Parmesan cheese. Lasagne alla ferrarese, from Ferrara, features sheets of green pasta (created by mixing spinach into the pasta dough) and may include pancetta, chicken livers, and other meats. A version from the Marche, known as vincisgrassi, features mushrooms and offal such as chicken livers and sweetbreads. lasagne alla genovese, from Genoa, combines a light béchamel with pesto and is then baked, although some more modern Genoese versions omit the béchamel and use boiled pasta.

Traditionally, pasta dough prepared in southern Italy used semolina and water; in the northern regions, where semolina was not available, flour and eggs were used. In Emilia-Romagna the dough or sfoglia was traditionally rolled paper-thin by hand, often by a professional sfoglina. In modern Italy, since the only type of wheat allowed for commercially sold dried pasta is durum wheat, industrial dried lasagne sheets are made from durum wheat semolina.

== Gallery ==
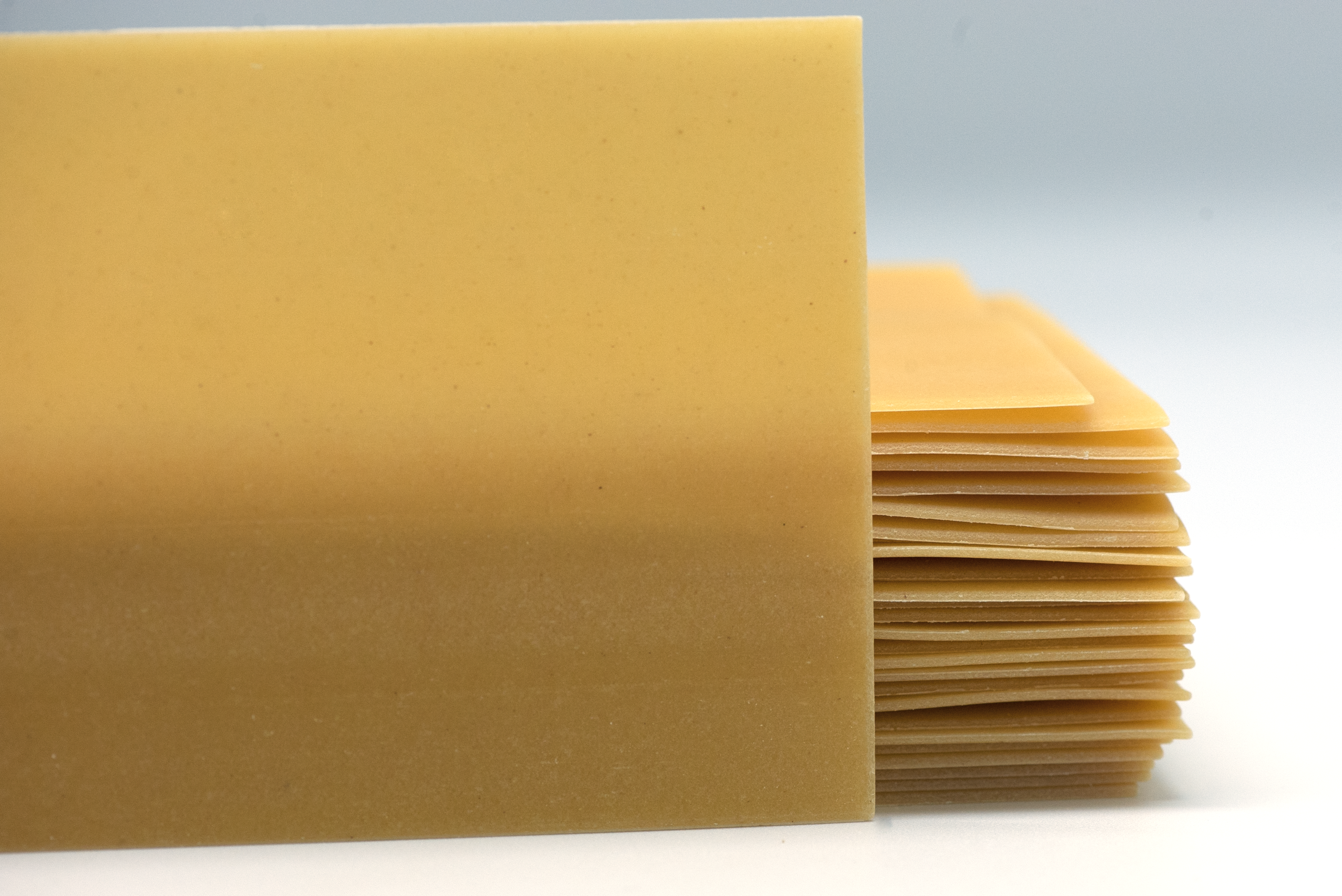
Flat sheets of lasagna before cooking

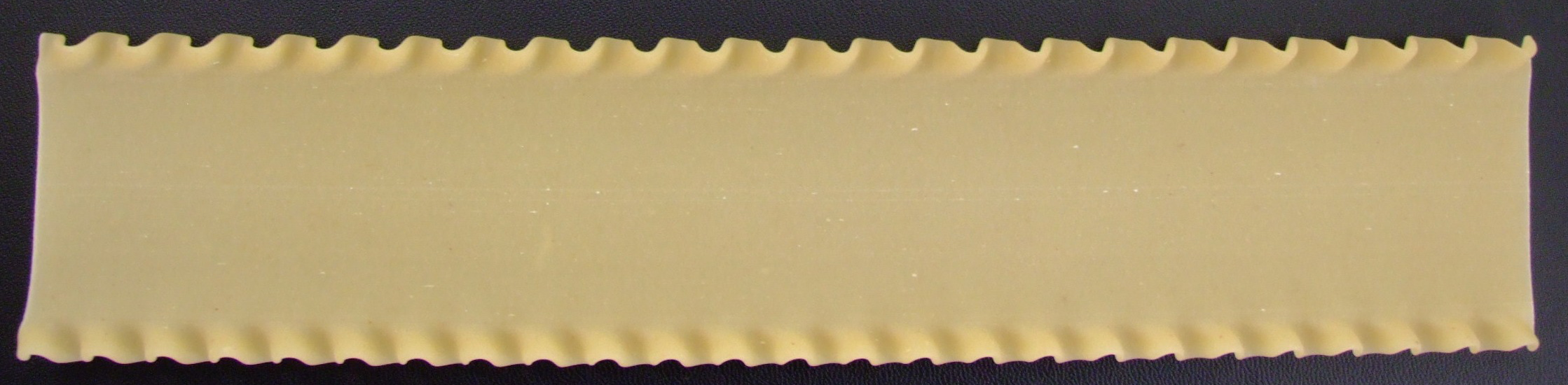
Lasagna with ruffled edges

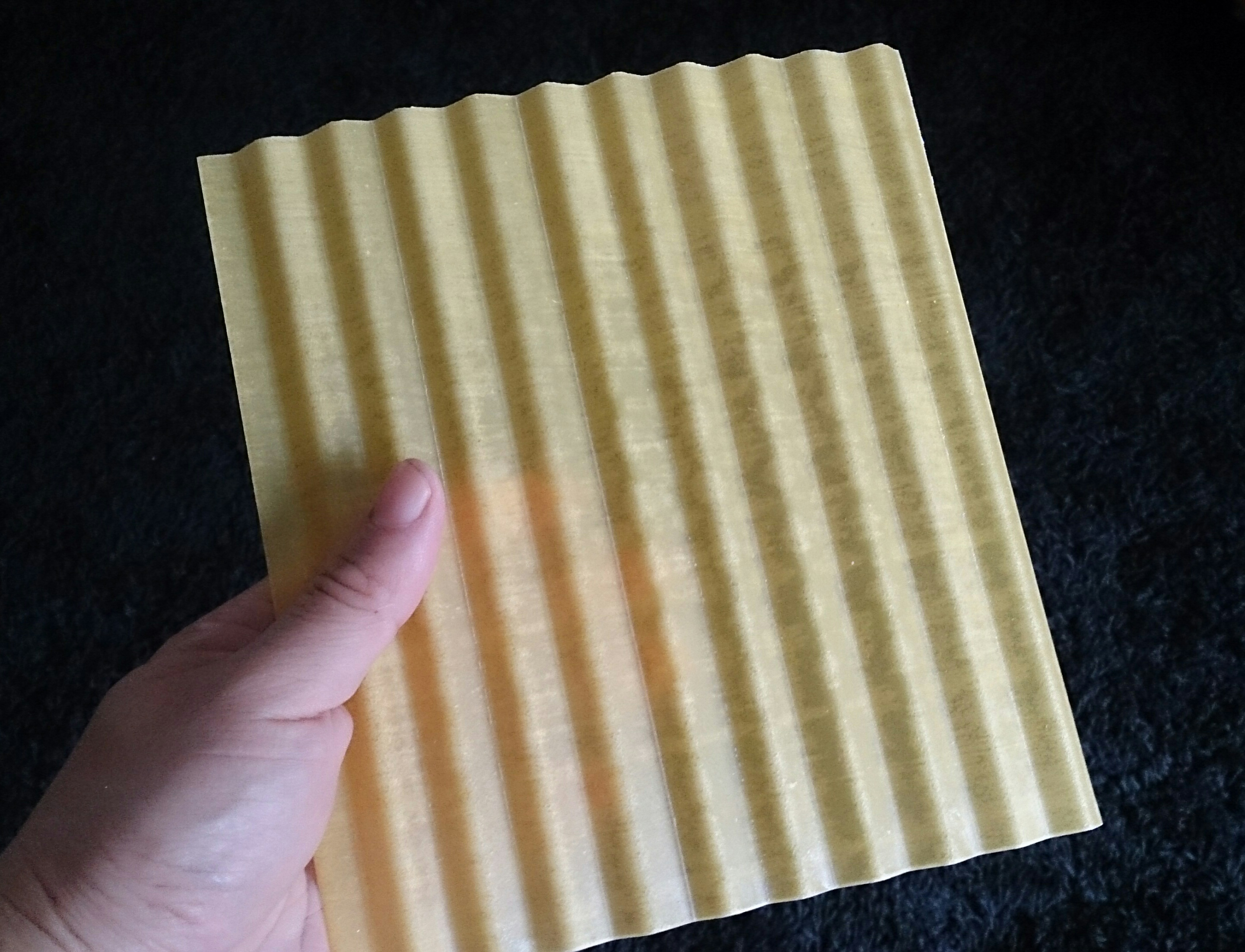
Completely ridged lasagna

== See also ==
Media related to Lasagne (layered dish) at Wikimedia Commons Lasagne at the Wikibooks Cookbook subproject

- List of pasta
- List of pasta dishes
- List of casserole dishes
- Casserole
- Pastitsio
- Macarona bil-bechamel
- Moussaka
