= Moussaka =

Dish of layered vegetables, sauce and meat

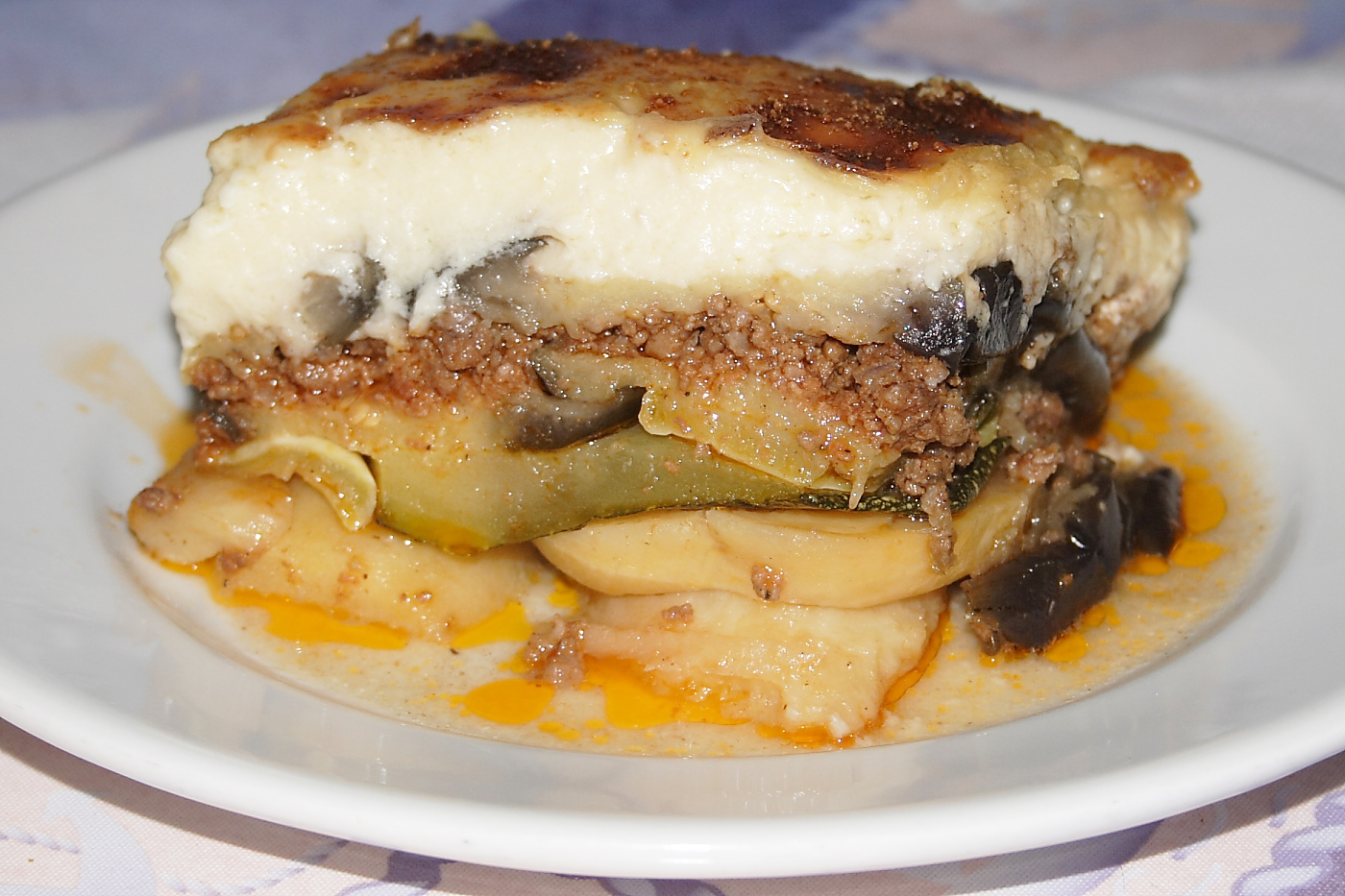
- A dish of Greek moussaka
- Course: Main course
- Place of origin: Egypt, Greece, Middle East (cooked salad form), Levant
- Region or state: The Balkans and Eastern Mediterranean
- Serving temperature: Hot or cold
- Main ingredients: aubergine (eggplant) or potatoes, minced meat
- Variations: Multiple

Moussaka (/muːˈsɑːkə/, UK also /ˌmuːsəˈkɑː/, US also /ˌmuːsɑːˈkɑː/; see below) is an aubergine (eggplant)- or potato-based dish, often including ground meat, which is common in the Balkans and the Middle East, with many local and regional variations.

The modern Greek variant was created in the 1920s by Nikolaos Tselementes. Many versions have a top layer made of milk-based sauce thickened with egg (custard) or flour (béchamel sauce). In Greece, the dish is layered and typically served hot. Tselementes also proposed a vegan variant for orthodox fast days. Romania also has a vegan version that replaces meat with mushrooms or a mix of sautéed onions and rice.

The versions in Egypt, Turkey and the rest of the Middle East are quite different. In Egypt, mesaqa‘ah can be made vegan or vegetarian as well as with meat; in all cases, the main ingredient is the fried aubergine. In Turkey, mussaka consists of thinly sliced and fried aubergine served in a tomato-based meat sauce, warm or at room temperature. In Saudi Arabia, muṣagga‘a is eaten hot, but in other Arab countries, it is often eaten cold, but occasionally hot as well.

== Names and etymology ==
The English name for moussaka was borrowed from Greek mousakás (μουσακάς) and from other Balkan languages, all borrowed from Ottoman Turkish, which in turn borrοwed it from Arabic muṣaqqa‘a (مصقّعة, lit. 'pounded' or 'cold'). The word is first attested in English in 1862 in an English language translation of a Turkish cookbook called Melceü't-Tabbâhîn, written mùzàkkà. According to food historian Charles Perry, the word is derived from the Arabic word for "moistened" (Arabic: مسقاة, romanized: musaqqâ), which is likely derived from the fact that the dish is soaked in broth.

== History ==
Similar eggplant dishes called maghmūmat appear in the 13th-century Arabic cookbook kitab al-Tabikh by Muhammad bin Hasan al-Baghdadi, like the modern version, the recipe calls for alternating slices of eggplant and spiced minced meat and onions, all of which are layered on a shallow pan. Several recipes for it can be found in 19th-century Ottoman Turkish cookbooks, like the 1882 cookbook Ev Kadını, and the 1862 English translation of Melceü't-Tabbâhîn. As well an 1893 Arabic cookbook from Egypt.

== Preparation ==
=== Greece ===
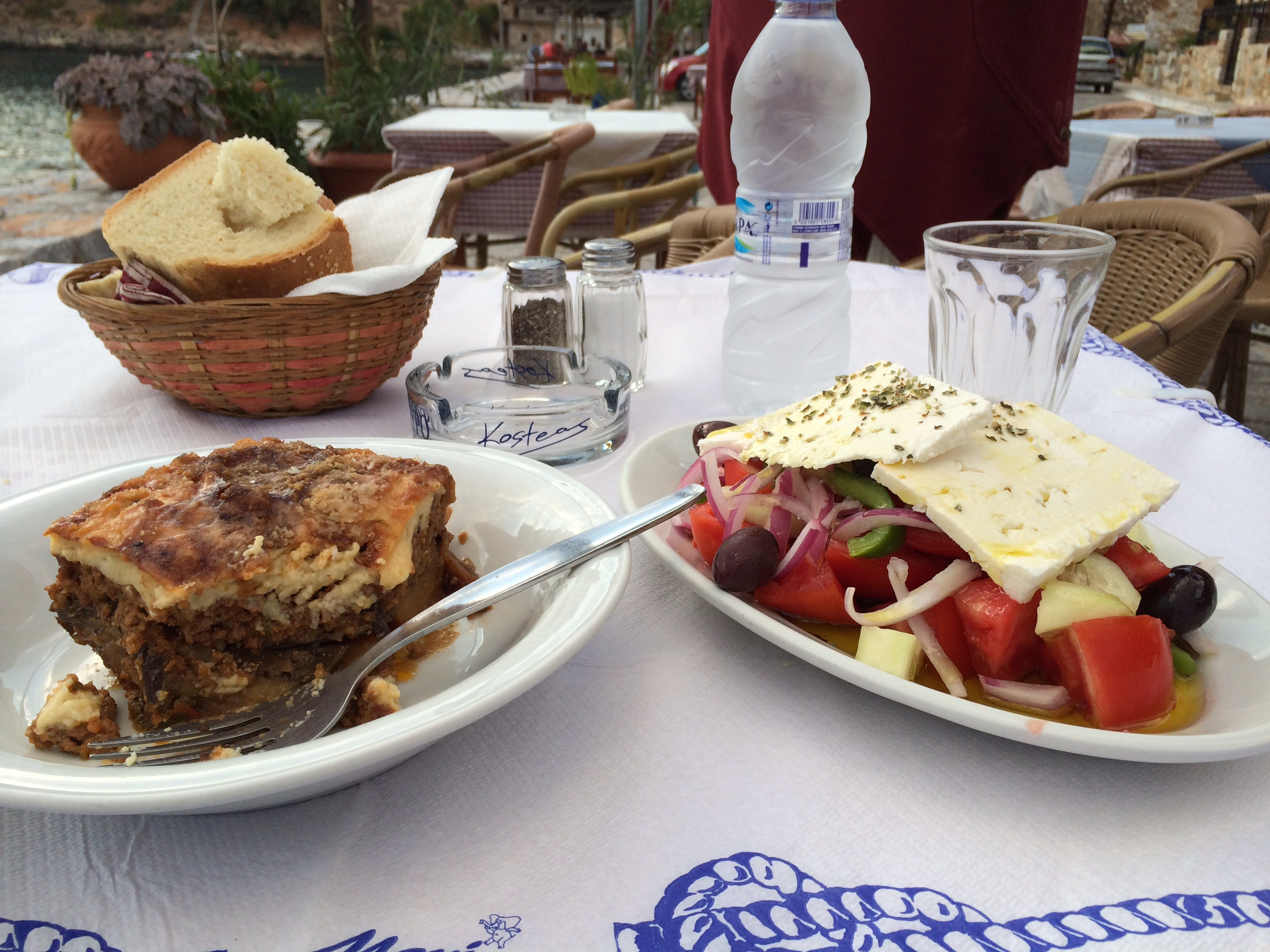
Moussaka and Greek salad at a taverna in Greece

Most versions are based primarily on sautéed aubergine (eggplant) and tomato, usually with minced meat, mostly lamb. The Greek version includes layers of meat and aubergine topped with a béchamel ("white") sauce and baked.

The modern Greek version was created by the French-trained Greek chef Nikolaos Tselementes in the 1920s. His recipe has three layers that are separately cooked before being combined for the final baking: a bottom layer of sliced aubergine sautéed in olive oil; a middle layer of ground lamb lightly cooked with chopped or puréed tomatoes, onion, garlic, and spices (cinnamon, allspice and black pepper); and a top layer of béchamel sauce or savoury custard.

There are variations on this basic recipe, sometimes with no top sauce, sometimes with other vegetables. Such variants may include, in addition to the aubergine slices, sautéed zucchini (courgette) slices, part-fried potato slices, or sautéed mushrooms. There is a fast-day (vegan) version in Tselementes' cookbook, which includes neither meat nor dairy products, just vegetables (ground aubergine is used instead of ground meat), tomato sauce, and bread crumbs.

Another variant is (melitzánes) papoutsákia (μελιτζάνες) παπουτσάκια (lit. 'aubergine, little shoe style') which consists of whole small aubergines stuffed with ground meat and topped with béchamel and baked.

=== Other countries of Southeast Europe ===
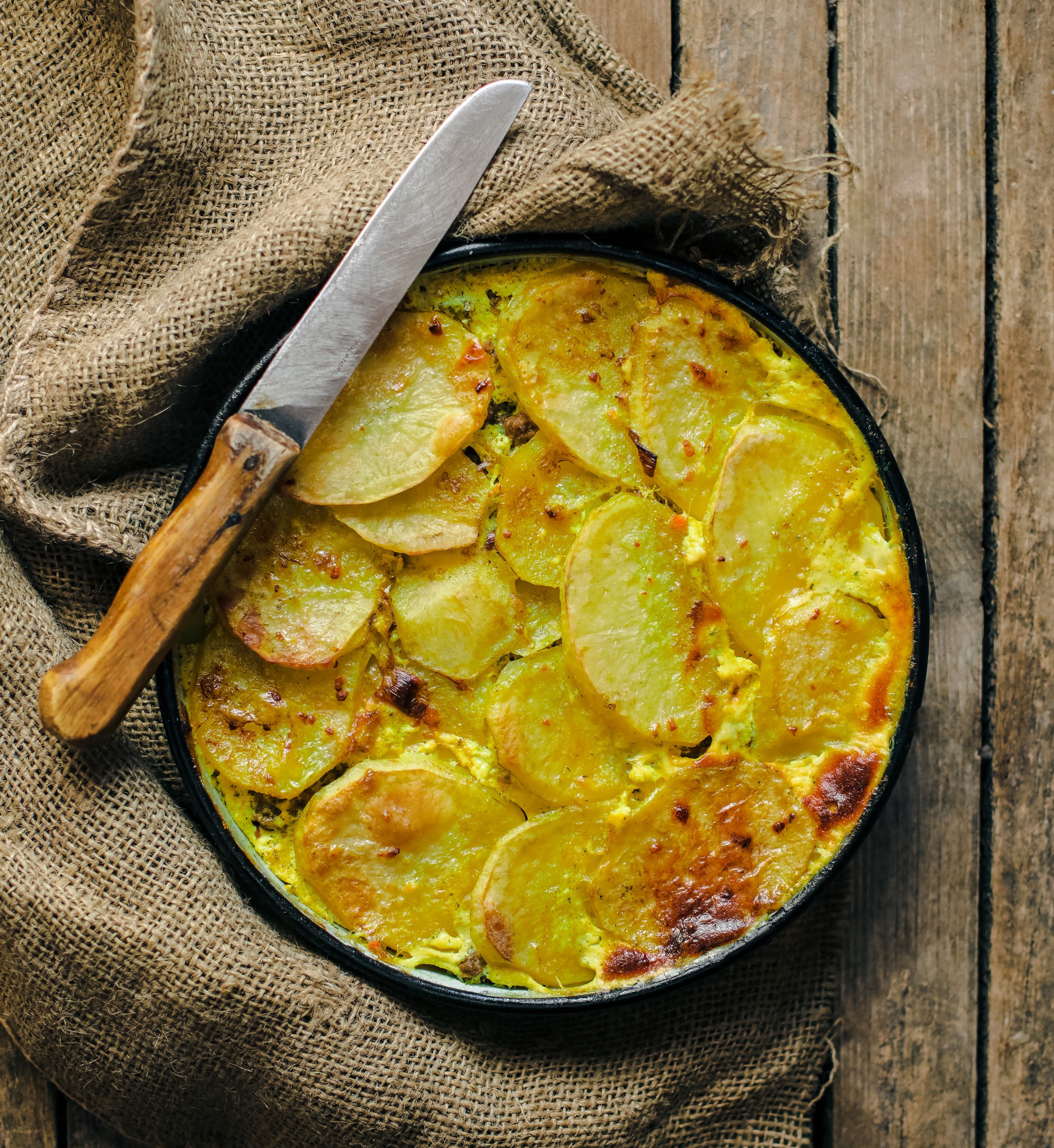
Potato moussaka prepared in North Macedonia

In Albania, Bulgaria, the former Yugoslavia, and Romania, potatoes are used instead of aubergine, pork or beef mince, and the top layer is usually milk or yogurt mixed with raw eggs, sometimes with a small amount of flour added. There is also a three-layer version: the bottom layer consists of ground pork and beef, the middle layer of potato slices, and the top layer is typically a custard. Each layer is cooked on its own and layered in a pan and baked until the top is browned.

Typically, the Romanian version is made with potatoes or aubergine or cabbage. The layers start with the vegetable, then the layer of meat (usually pork), then vegetables, until the pot is full. Sometimes bread crumbs are used as a topping, sometimes slices of tomatoes and crushed cheese. The pot is then filled with tomato sauce. There is also a pasta variant, with pasta being used instead of vegetables. The "fasting" variant, which is vegan, replaces meat with mushrooms or a mix of sautéed onions and rice.

In the rest of the Balkans, the top layer is often a custard; this is the version introduced to the UK by Elizabeth David's Mediterranean Cookery and where it remains the usual presentation. Grated cheese or bread crumbs are often sprinkled on top. The potato version is also the most commonly used version in Norway, despite the most common of those potato versions (Toro) being incorrectly marketed as "Greek moussaka".

=== Levant ===
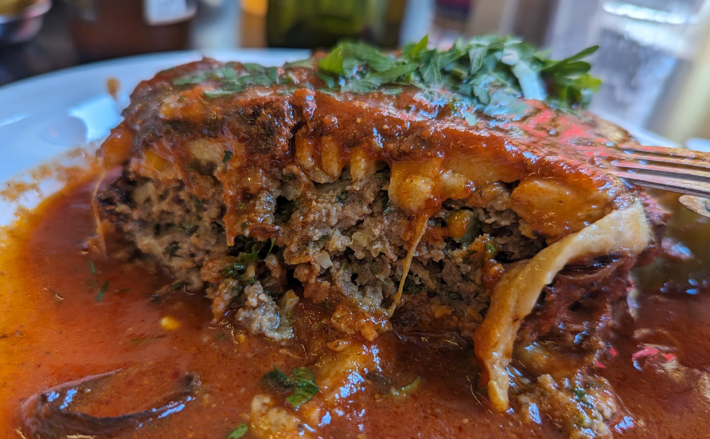
Non-dairy moussaka served in a Sephardic/Mizrahi restaurant in Jerusalem

In Lebanon, moussaka is a cooked dish made up primarily of tomatoes and aubergine, similar to Sicilian caponata, and may also include chickpeas. It may be served cold as a mezze dish, or hot. Lebanese moussaka has a stew-like consistency compared to other vatieties. The name maghmour (مغمور) is also used in Lebanon. The Syrian and Lebanese musaqa'a (Arabic: مسقعة) is made in different ways, and differs greatly from the Greek version, it may contain whole fried small augerbines, and may be cooked on top of a stove, it often contains onions and chickpeas.

Moussaka in Palestinian cuisine generally has minced meat between layers of eggplants. In the Gaza Strip, musaqa’a also includes tomatoes. Meat in the Gazan version is omitted or substituted for canned meat when not available.

=== Egypt ===
The Egyptian version of moussaka, mesaqa‘ah, is made from layers of fried aubergine immersed in tomato sauce and then baked. A layer of seasoned cooked ground beef is usually added between the aubergine before baking. The dish can be served hot but is usually chilled for a day or so to improve the taste.

A recipe for musaqqaʻah (مسقعة) appears in the 1893 Arabic cookbook written by Isma'il Pasha of Egypt's personal chef, Ahmed Ibrahim.

=== Iraq ===
Iraqi tepsi baytinijan is considered to be a variety of moussaka, it is a baked casserole of fried eggplant slices, meatballs, onions, and tomatoes, often served during Ramadan.

=== Turkey ===
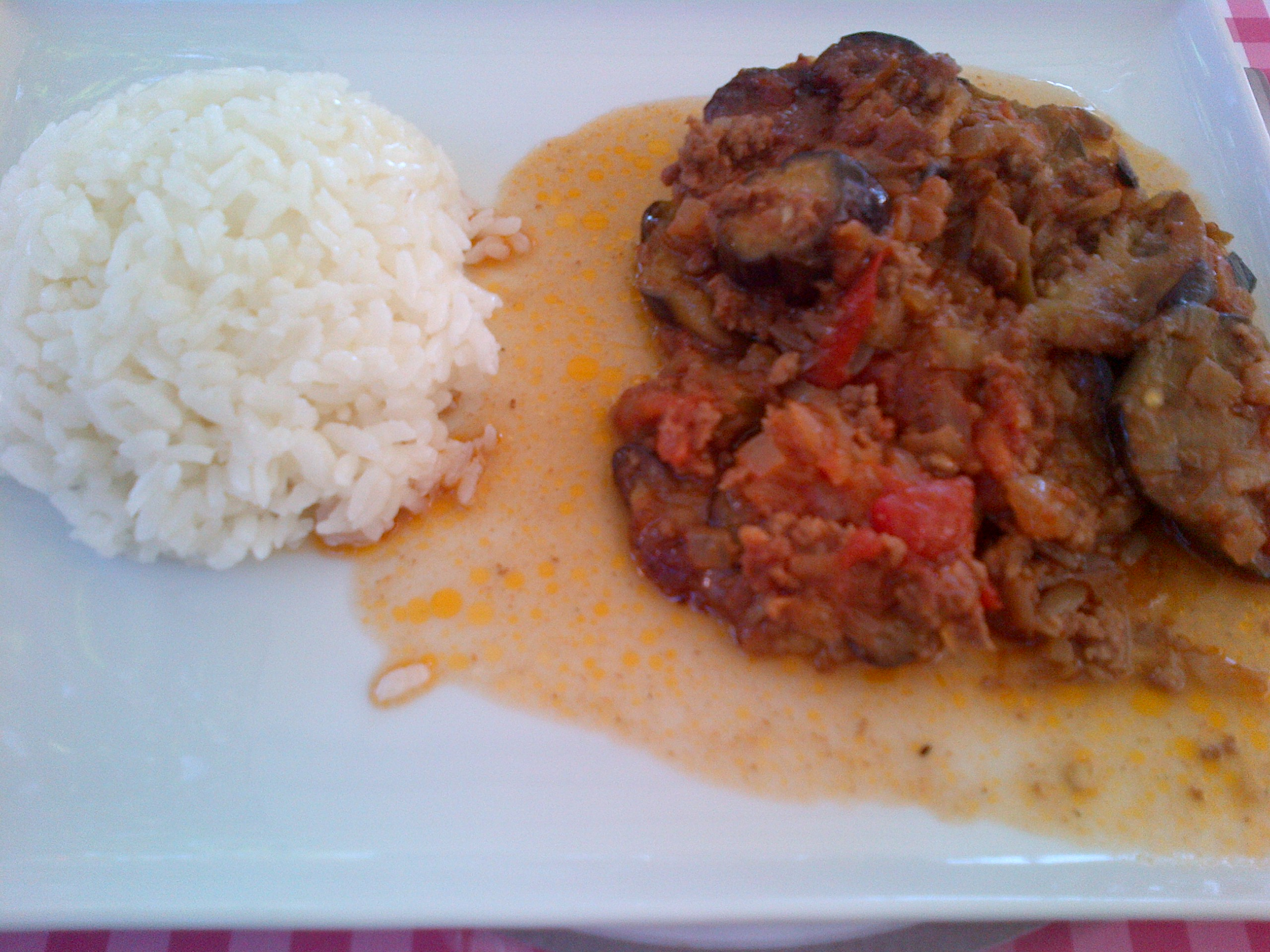
Musakka and pilav in Turkey

Turkish musakka is not layered. Instead, thinly sliced aubergine is fried and served in tomato-based meat sauce seasoned with green peppers, garlic and onions. It is generally eaten with pilav and cacık. There are also variants with zucchini (courgettes, kabak musakka), carrots (havuç musakka) and potatoes (patates musakka).

== See also ==
- List of casserole dishes
- Karnıyarık – dish comparable to moussaka, popular in Turkey
- Parmigiana - sliced aubergine layered with cheese and tomato sauce and then baked, popular in Italy
- Tepsi baytinijan – dish comparable to moussaka, popular in Iraq
