= François Pierre La Varenne =

French chef (1615–1678)

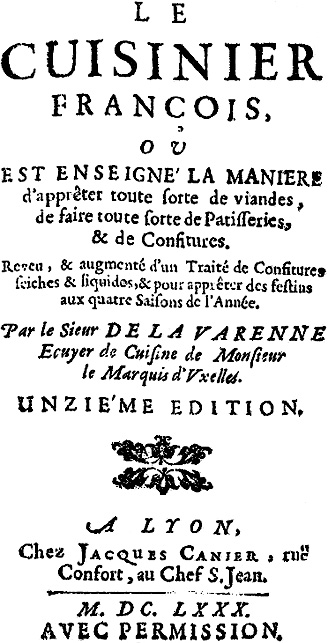
The first page of Le cuisinier françois by La Varenne, 11th edition, 1680

François Pierre de la Varenne (French pronunciation: [fʁɑ̃swa pjɛʁ də la vaʁɛn], 1615–1678 in Dijon), Burgundian by birth, was the author of Le Cuisinier françois (1651), one of the most influential cookbooks in early modern French cuisine. La Varenne's book expressed the culinary innovations that had revolutionised medieval and Renaissance French cookery in the 16th century and early 17th century.

== Historical context ==
La Varenne was the foremost member of a group of French chefs, writing for a professional audience, who codified French cuisine in the age of King Louis XIV. The others were Nicolas de Bonnefons, Le Jardinier françois (1651) and Les Délices de la campagne (1654), and François Massialot, Le Cuisinier royal et bourgeois (1691), which was still being edited and modernised in the mid-18th century. The cookbook was still used in France until the French Revolution.

The seventeenth century saw a culinary revolution which transported French gastronomy into the modern era. The heavily spiced flavours inherited from the cuisine of the Middle Ages (as documented, notably, in Le Viandier by Taillevent) were abandoned in favour of the natural flavours of foods. Exotic and costly spices (saffron, cinnamon, cumin, ginger, nutmeg, cardamom, nigella, seeds of paradise) were, with the exception of pepper, replaced by local herbs (parsley, thyme, bayleaf, chervil, sage, tarragon). New vegetables like cauliflower, asparagus, peas, cucumber and artichoke were introduced.

Special care was given to the cooking of meat in order to conserve maximum flavour. Vegetables had to be fresh and tender. Fish, with the improvement of transportation, had to be impeccably fresh. Preparation had to respect the gustatory and visual integrity of the ingredients instead of masking them as had been the practice previously. Finally, a rigorous separation between salted and sweet dishes was introduced, the former served before the latter, banishing the Renaissance taste for mixing sweet and salted ingredients in the same dish or in the same part of the meal.

== Works ==
=== Le Cuisinier françois (1651) ===
La Varenne's work was the first to set down in writing the considerable culinary innovations achieved in France in the seventeenth century, while codifying food preparation in a systematic manner, according to rules and principles. He introduced the first bisque and Béchamel sauce. He replaced crumbled bread with roux as the base for sauces, and lard with butter. Here one finds the first usage of the terms bouquet garni, fonds de cuisine (stocks) and reductions, and the use of egg-whites for clarification and the extensive use of egg yolks combined with Verjuice to finish the sauce of most stews.

It also contains the earliest recipe in print for mille-feuille. The cooking of vegetables is addressed, an unusual departure. In a fragrant sauce for asparagus there is evidence of an early form of hollandaise sauce: "make a sauce with good fresh butter, a little vinegar, salt, and nutmeg, and an egg yolk to bind the sauce; take care that it doesn't curdle..."

La Varenne preceded his book with a text on confitures—jams, jellies and preserves—that included recipes for syrups, compotes and a great variety of fruit drinks, as well as a section on salads (1650).

=== Le Pâtissier françois (1653) ===
La Varenne followed his groundbreaking work with a second book, Le Pâtissier françois (Paris 1653), which is generally credited with being the first comprehensive French work on pastry-making. In 1662 appeared the first of the combined editions that presented all three works together. All the early editions of La Varenne's works—Le Cuisinier françois ran through thirty editions in seventy-five years—are extremely rare; like children's books, they too were worn to pieces, in the kitchen, and simply used up.

Pirated editions of Le Cuisinier françois were printed in Amsterdam (1653) and The Hague (1654–56). Soon there were imitators: Le Cuisinier françois méthodique was published anonymously in Paris, 1660. The English translation, The French Cook (London 1653) was the first French cookbook translated into English. It introduced professional terms like à la mode, au bleu (very rare), and au naturel which are now standard culinary expressions. Its success can be gauged from the fact that over 250,000 copies were printed in about 250 editions and it remained in print until 1815.

It is said that La Varenne's first training was in the kitchens of the queen Marie de' Medici. At the time his books were published, La Varenne had ten years' experience as chef de cuisine to Nicolas Chalon du Blé, Marquis of Uxelles (marquis d'Uxelles in French), to whom he dedicated his publications and whom he immortalised in duxelles, finely-minced mushrooms seasoned with herbs and shallots, which is still a favourite flavouring for fish and vegetables. The Marquis of Uxelles was the royal governor of Chalon-sur-Saône, thought by some to be the birthplace of La Varenne.

Le Cuisinier françois was reprinted in 1983, published by Editions Montalba and edited by Jean-Marie Flandrin, Philip Hyman and Mary Hyman with a comprehensive introductory essay.
