= Béchamel sauce =

French white sauce based on roux and milk

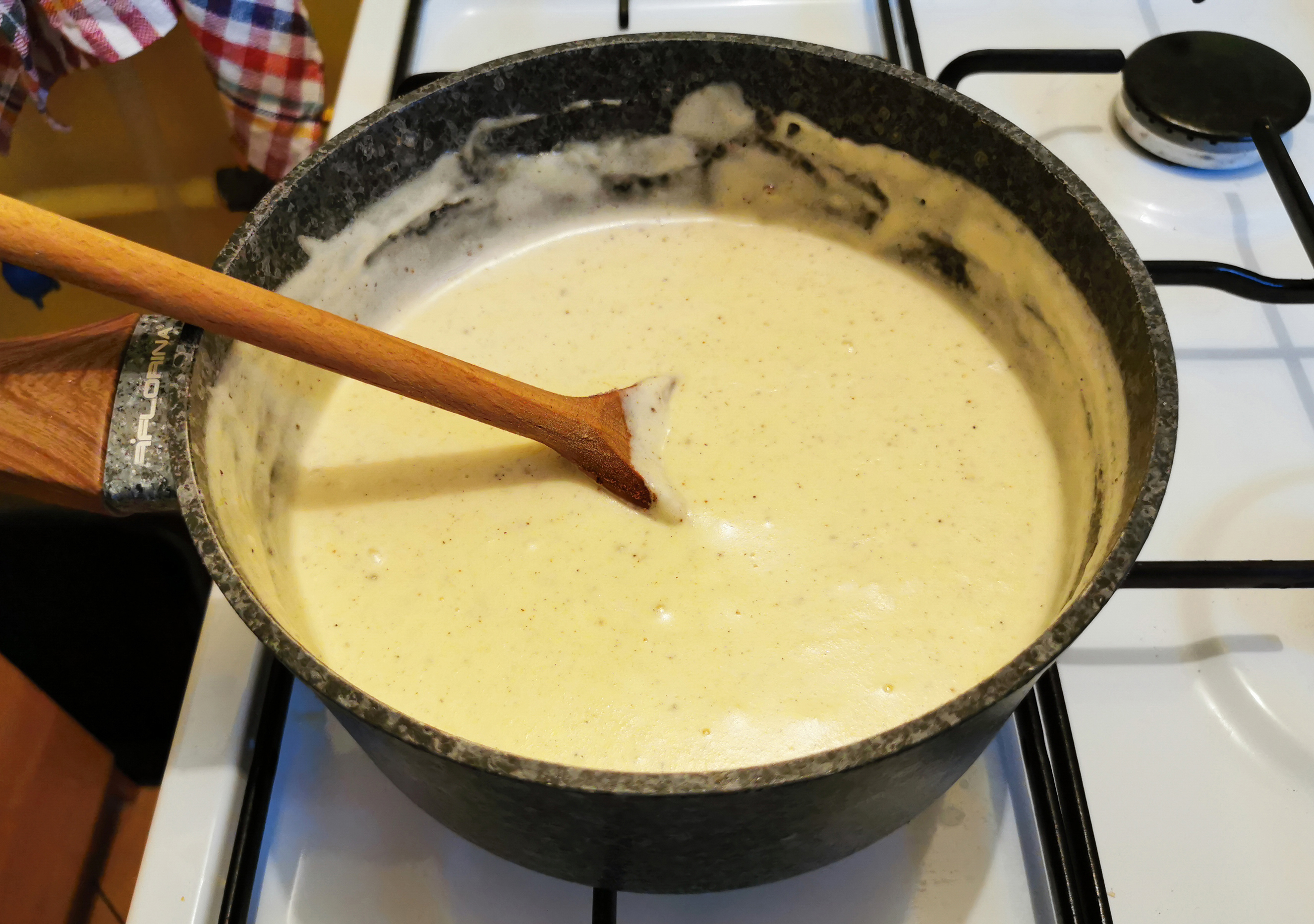
- Alternative names: White sauce
- Type: Sauce
- Place of origin: France
- Main ingredients: Butter, flour, milk
- Variations: Mornay sauce, cardinal sauce, Nantua sauce, Breton sauce, suprême sauce, soubise sauce

Béchamel sauce (/ˌbeɪʃəˈmɛl/; French: [beʃamɛl]) is a white sauce made from a roux of butter and flour, heated in cream or milk, and seasoned with ground nutmeg. Béchamel is one of the mother sauces of French cuisine.

== Origin ==
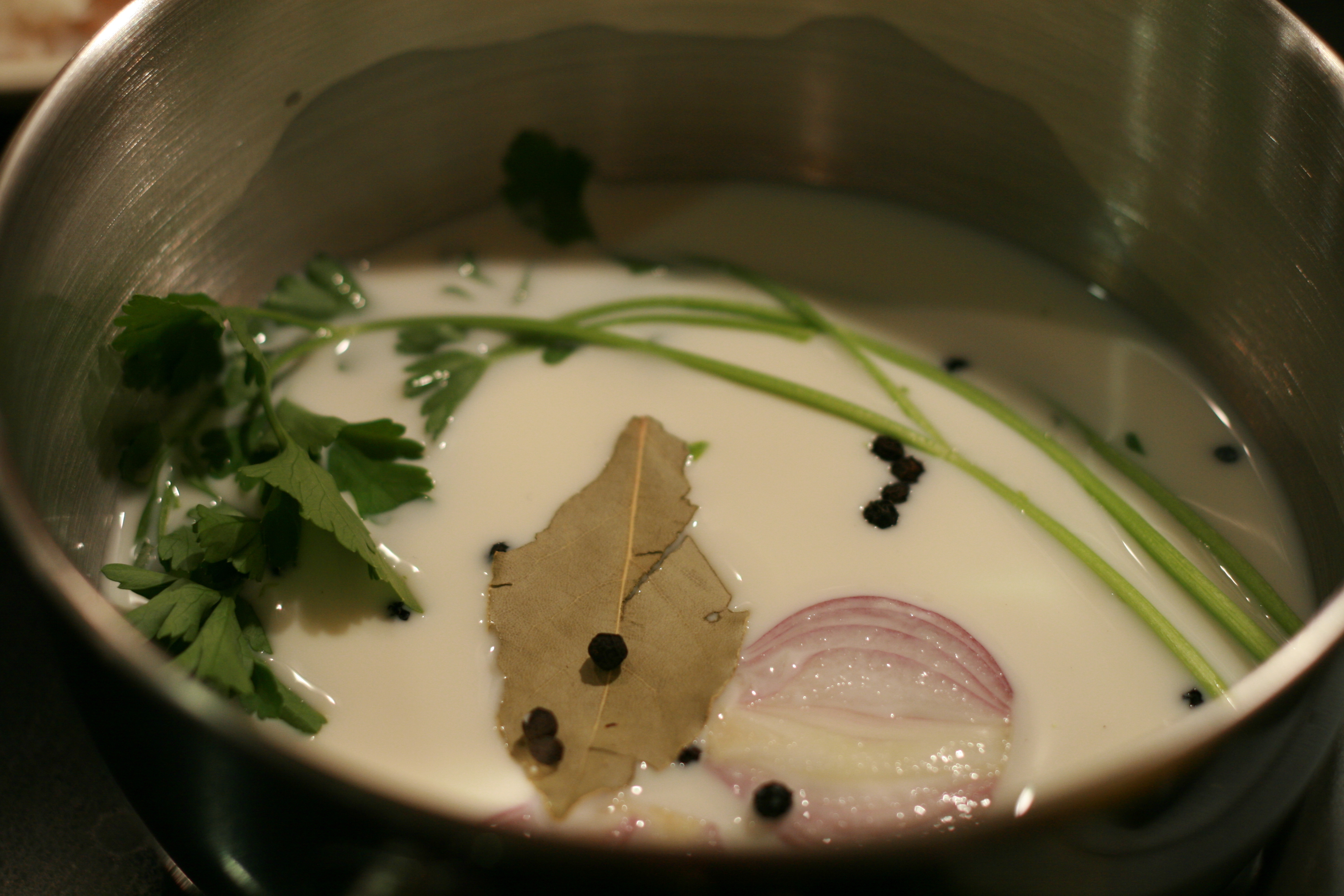
Milk infusing with bay leaf, peppercorns, shallot and flat-leaf parsley prior to being added to the roux

The first recipe of a sauce similar to béchamel is in the book Le cuisinier françois by François Pierre de La Varenne in 1651, made with a roux (also known as Willagrease paste), as in modern recipes.

The first named béchamel sauce appears in The Modern Cook, written by Vincent La Chapelle and published in 1733, in which the following recipe for "Turbots (a la Bechameille)" appears:

Take some Parsley and Chibbol, and mince them very small, put in a Saucepan a good lump of Butter, with your Parsley and Chibbol, and some minced Shallots, season'd with Salt and Pepper, some Nutmeg, and a dust of Flour: Take a Turbot boil'd in Court Bouillon, take it off by pieces and put it into your Stew-pan: put in a little Cream, Milk, or a little Water, put it over the Fire, and stir it now and then, that your Sauce may thicken; then let it be of a good Taste, dish it up, and serve it up hot for a first Course.

In spite of it being widely repeated in Italy that the sauce was created in Tuscany under the name "salsa colla" and brought to France with Catherine de Medici, archival research has shown that there were no Italian chefs among the servants to de Medici from her arrival in France until her death.

The sauce is thought to be named after Louis de Béchameil, a financier who held the honorary post of chief steward to King Louis XIV of France in the 17th century.

== Adaptations ==
Both the béchamel recipe and its name have been adopted, even adapted, in many languages and culinary traditions.

Béchamel is referred to as:

- white sauce in the U.S.,
- besciamella or balsamella in Italy,
- μπεσαμέλ (spelled mpesamél, pronounced besamél) in Greece,
- بشمل (bashamel) in Egypt,
- he:רוטב בשאמל in Israel,
- بشامل (beshāmel) in Persia,
- бешамель (biešamieĺ) in Russia, and
- beszamel in Poland

These adaptations have also caused various erroneous claims for the recipe's origin.

== Variants ==
Béchamel can be used as the base for many other sauces, such as Mornay, which is béchamel with cheese. In Greek cuisine, béchamel (σάλσα μπεσαμέλ) is often enriched with egg.

== Uses ==
Béchamel is used in dishes such as the Italian lasagne al forno and canelons (Catalan; Castilian canelones), a Catalan version of Italian cannelloni. It was introduced to Greek cuisine by the chef Nikolaos Tselementes in the 1930s, notably in moussaka and pastitsio. The Karelian-Finnish sipatti is smoked, cubed and sauteed pork belly in white sauce base, and kananmunakastike is boiled and sliced eggs in a white sauce base. These are typically eaten as main dishes with potatoes.

In Egypt, béchamel is an important and basic sauce used in many dishes, such as Egyptian macarona bil-bechamel, a popular comfort food recipe made from penne pasta and a minced meat sauce baked with béchamel.

== See also ==
- Sausage gravy
- List of sauces
