= Főzelék =

Type of Hungarian stew or soup

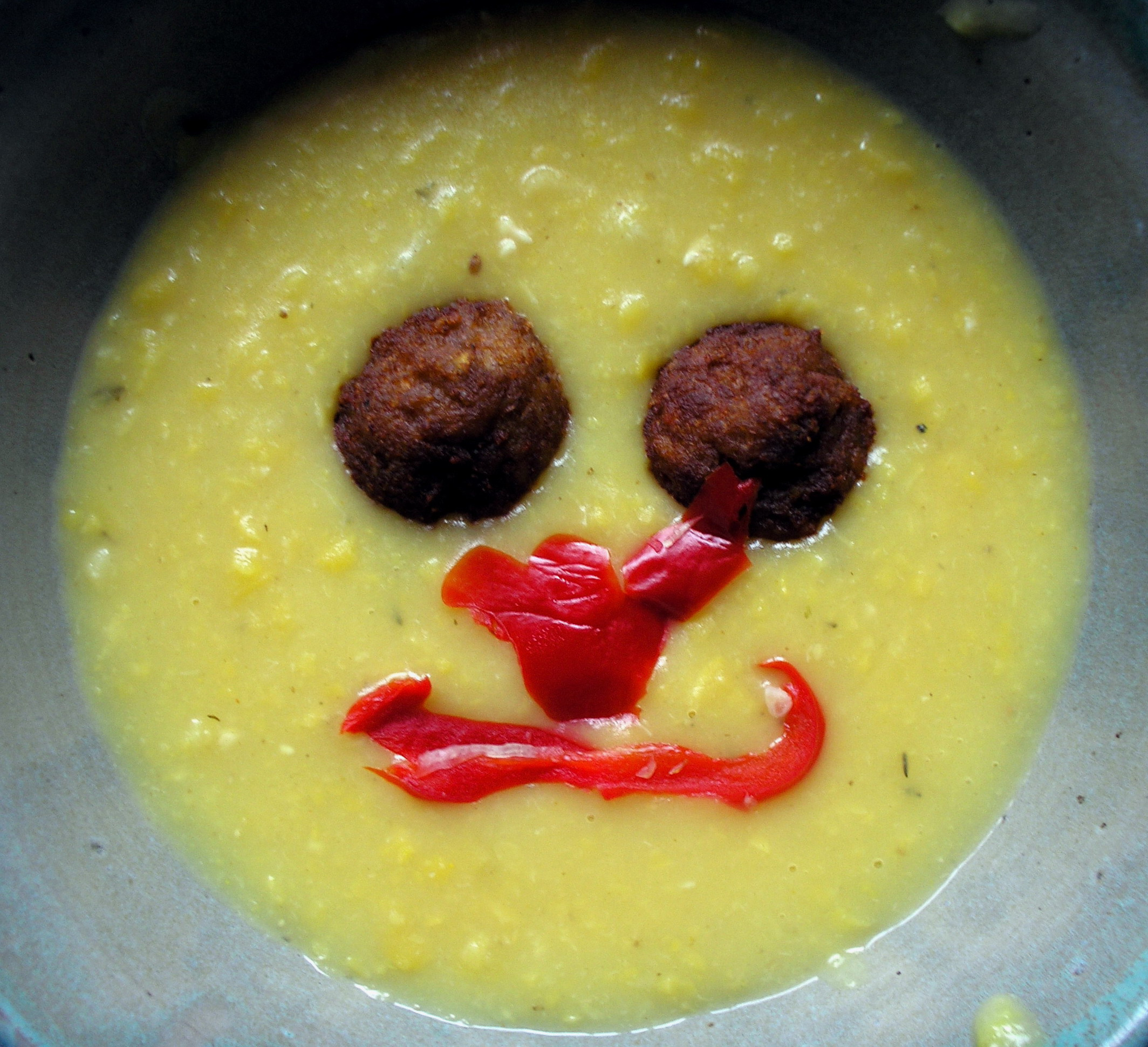
- Fasírt (meatballs) and red pepper make a smiley face in a bowl of főzelék
- Type: Stew
- Place of origin: Hungary
- Serving temperature: Warm
- Main ingredients: Vegetables (peas, potatoes, lentils, cabbage, carrots, squash, spinach, beans)

Főzelék (Hungarian: [ˈføːzɛleːk]) is a type of thick Hungarian vegetable stew or soup, similar to pottage. Főzelék is a special category in Hungarian cuisine, not quite like a soup and thinner than a stew. It is simply cooked, typically by simmering, not mashing. It is usually not cooked with meat, but bacon and spicy sausage may be added for flavor. Főzelék is often eaten as the main course for lunch or as a garnish for different meat courses. Főzelék was typically a home-made food and was considered an ordinary type of meal, so traditionally it seldom appeared on restaurant menus, but in recent years, as part of the culinary revolution in Hungary, főzelék has enjoyed a revival and is much more common to be found on menus; there are even places dedicated to offering various főzelék as main courses.

== Etymology ==
Its name roots in the verb főz ("cook"), modified by the -(a/e)lék suffix which renders the meaning to the results of the verb. Thus the word főzelék approximately means "[something] created by cooking". Hence in Hungarian a prefix is always used to make clear what the given főzelék is actually made of, e.g.: tökfőzelék (traditionally made of marrow but zucchini or other type of squash is also becoming popular), babfőzelék (made of beans) etc.

== Preparation ==
Főzelék can be made with a variety of ingredients including cabbage, potatoes, sauerkraut, tomatoes, peas, carrots, kale, kohlrabi, lentils, pinto beans, squash, spinach, sorrel, yellow wax beans or mixed vegetables.

It is usually thickened with roux and/or sour cream, and some combination of the following may be added: chopped onions, paprika, bay leaf, black peppercorn, dill, caraway seeds, garlic, lemon juice, parsley or vinegar. If eaten alone it is often topped with pörkölt, fried eggs, smoked sausage, Hungarian meatballs flavoured with garlic, called fasírt, and other deep-fried foods.

== See also ==
- List of stews
