= Nikolaos Tselementes =

Greek chef and cookbook author

Nikolaos Tselementes (Νικόλαος Τσελεμεντές)
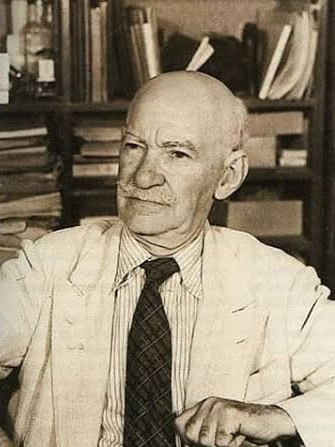
- Born: 1878; Exampela, Sifnos, Greece
- Died: 2 March 1958 (aged 79–80)
- Education: Vienna
- Culinary career
- Cooking style: Greek, French
- Previous restaurants
- Hermes Hotel, Athens; St. Moritz Hotel, New York

Nikólaos Tselementés (Greek: Νικόλαος Τσελεμεντές) (1878 – 2 March 1958) was a Greek chef and cookbook author of the early 20th century. He is considered one of the most influential cookery writers of modern Greece, specialising in both Greek and French cuisine.

== Biography and career ==
He was born in Exabela (Εξάμπελα), a village on the island of Sifnos, and grew up in Athens, where he finished high school. At first, he worked as a notary clerk, then he started cooking, working at his father's and uncle's restaurant.

He studied cooking for a year in Vienna and, on his return to Greece, worked for various embassies. He became initially known for the magazine Cooking Guide (Odigos Mageirikis) that he began publishing in 1910, which included – in addition to recipes – nutritional advice, international cuisine, cooking news, etc.

In 1919, he became manager of hotel "Hermes", and the next year he left for America, where he worked in several well-known restaurants, while also following higher studies in cooking, confectionery and dietetics.

In 1930, he published the influential cookbook Cooking and Patisserie Guide (Οδηγός μαγειρικής και ζαχαροπλαστικής).

He returned to Greece in 1932, founded a small cooking and confectionery school and brought out his well-known book of recipes, which, being the first complete cookbook in Greek, had over fifteen official reprints during the following decades. In 1950, he published his only book in English, Greek Cookery.

Influenced by French cuisine, he had been the modernizer of Greek cuisine as, thanks to him, the Greek housewives learned of béchamel sauce, pirozhki, and bouillabaisse. He created also the modern versions of mousaka, pastitsio, and anginares (artichokes) alla polita.

His surname, Tselementes, is today in Greece a synonym of "cookbook", and is also used in jest about someone who can cook very well.

== Bibliography ==
- Kremezi, Aglaia (1996). "Nikolas Tselementes". In Harlan, Walker (ed.). Cooks & Other People (Proceedings of the Oxford Symposium on Food and Cookery, 1995). Totnes: Prospect Books. pp. 162–169. ISBN 090-732-572-6 – via Google Books. "Oxford Symposium on Food and Cookery is an annual weekend conference for current issues in food studies and food history."
