= Lasagnotte =

Type of pasta

- Type: Pasta
- Place of origin: Italy

Lasagnotte is a type of flat and wide pasta. It is very similar to lasagnette and is used in dishes in the same manner as lasagnette; however, lasagnotte is longer in length and has a rippled edge on only one side.

== See also ==
- List of pasta
- Lasagna
- Lasagnette
