= Mesaqaʻah =

Eggplant casserole eaten in Egypt and the Levant

Mesaqaʻah مسقعة
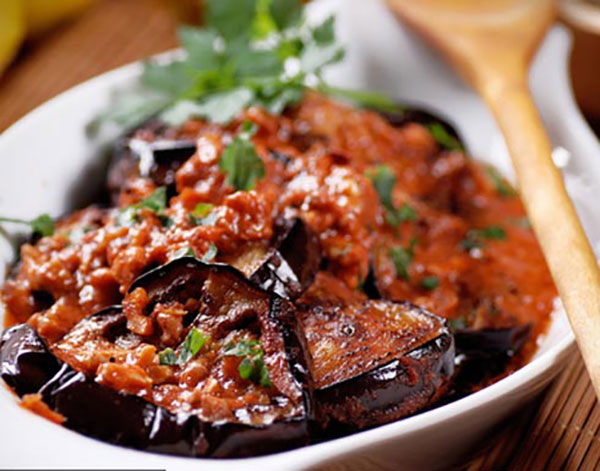
- Place of origin: Egypt and the Levant
- Main ingredients: Eggplant, green peppers and various spices and aromatics
- Similar dishes: Moussaka

Mesaqaʻah (Arabic: مسقعة, romanized: mesaʼaʻah) is a traditional dish enjoyed in Egypt and the countries of the Levant in slightly different variations depending on the country. More distant iterations of it are also eaten across the Mediterranean.

The Egyptian version of the dish features layers of fried eggplant, green peppers, and a garlicky tomato sauce, often spiced with cumin and occasionally allspice. The vegetarian casserole is typically baked until the flavors meld together, resulting in a hearty meal.

== Preparation ==
In Egypt, the preparation of mesaqaʻah involves slicing globe eggplants into rounds, which are then fried until golden brown. Mild green bell peppers and hot peppers are also fried briefly to retain their vibrant color. A garlicky tomato sauce, seasoned with cumin, salt, and pepper, is prepared separately. In a baking dish, layers of fried eggplant and peppers are assembled, interspersed with the tomato sauce. The dish is then baked until the flavors meld together. Mesaqaʻah is traditionally served warm or at room temperature, garnished with fresh parsley, and accompanied by vermicelli rice or eish baladi.

Alternatively, some Egyptian recipes suggest salting the eggplant slices to draw out excess moisture and reduce bitterness before frying them until golden brown. The fried eggplant slices are then combined with a tomato sauce made from sautéed onions, garlic, tomato paste, chopped tomatoes, and spices, and cooked gently until the sauce thickens. This version can be served immediately or refrigerated overnight and served cold with eish baladi.

More contemporary recipes also offer healthier alternatives by roasting the eggplant instead of frying, reducing oil absorption while maintaining flavor.

While it is typically vegetarian, it can also be made with minced beef.

== See also ==
- Egyptian cuisine
- Moussaka
- List of Middle Eastern dishes
- List of African dishes
