= Cardinal sauce =

French sauce

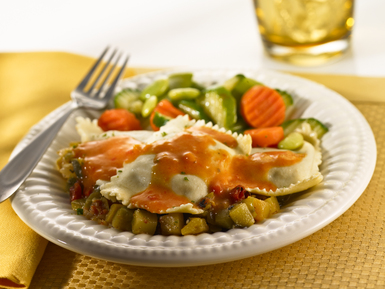
Ravioli provencale with cardinal sauce

Cardinal sauce is a classic French sauce, with a distinctive red colour coming from lobster butter and cayenne pepper.

In Le Guide Culinaire, Auguste Escoffier listed its main ingredients: béchamel sauce, fish stock, truffle reduction, cream, lobster butter and cayenne pepper.
