= Lasagnette =

Type of pasta

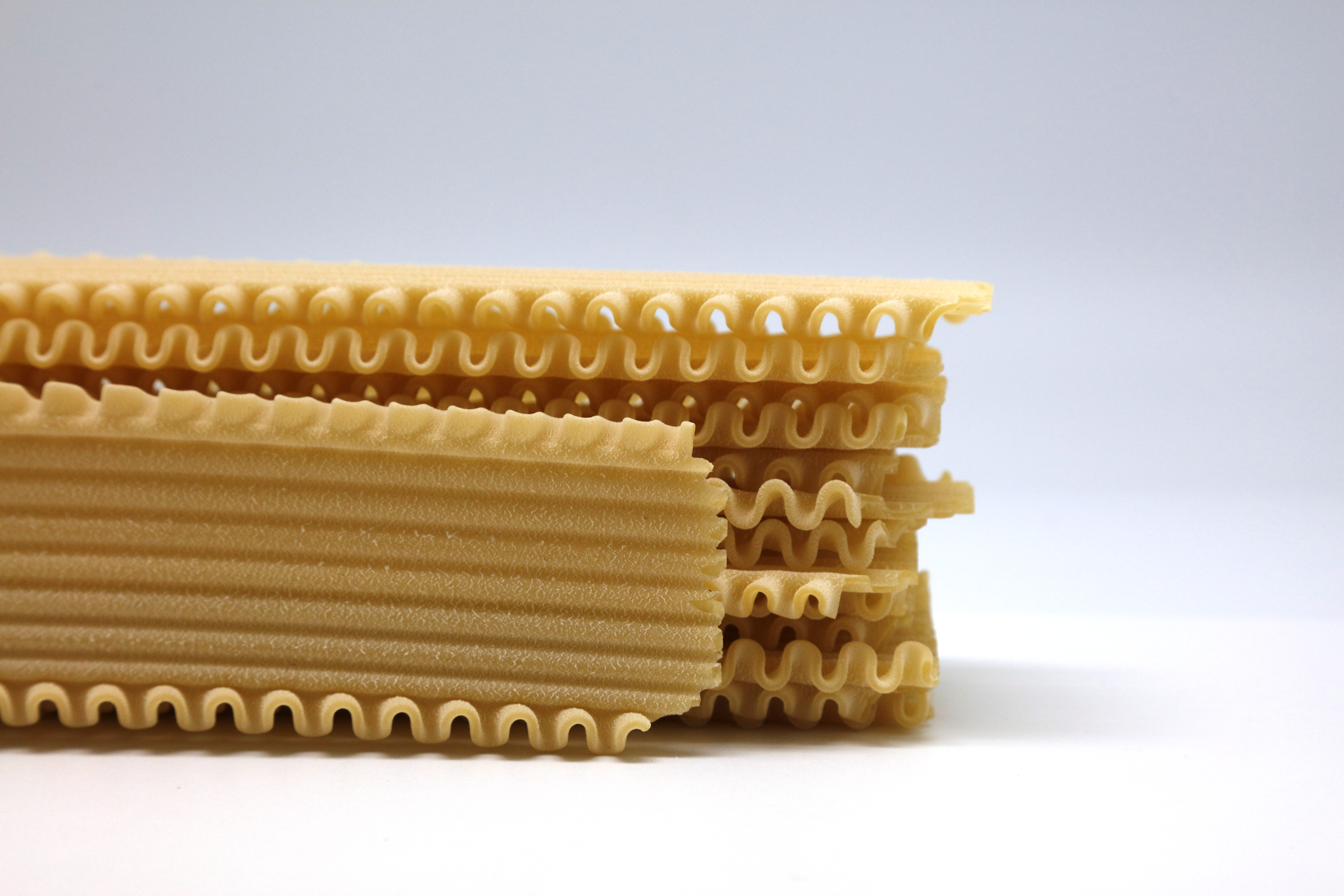
- Dry lasagnette pasta
- Type: Pasta
- Place of origin: Italy

Lasagnette is a type of ribbon pasta and a shorter version of lasagnotte. Characteristics of lasagnette differ based on the form of their edges. Different kinds could have edges with a waved cut on both sides, straight cut edges on both side, or a variation including one side with a straight cut and the other with a waved cut. Lasagnette can be prepared in various forms; the two most popular involve a thinner version of the traditional layered Italian lasagna. The second version combines ingredients of the recipe with the pasta, and is served tossed on a plate.

== See also ==
Media related to Lasagnette at Wikimedia Commons

- List of pasta
- Lasagna
- Lasagnotte
