= Stew =

Dish of ingredients cooked in liquid

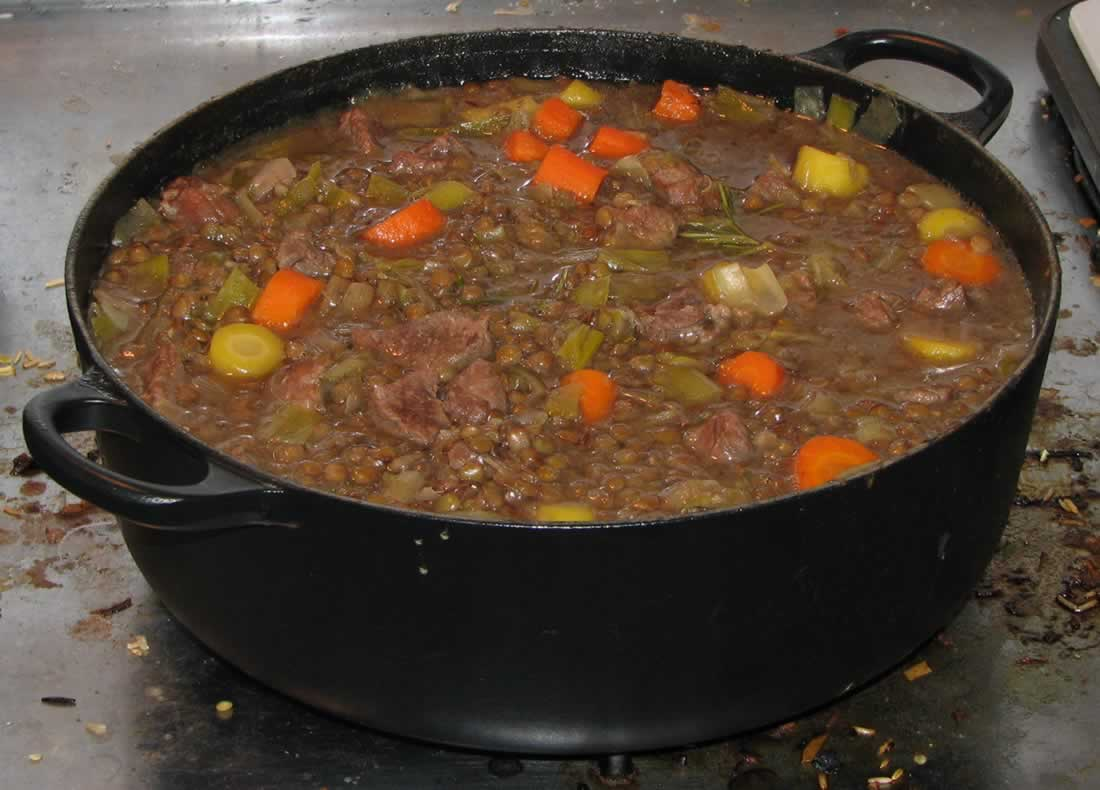
- Lamb and lentil stew
- Type: Stew
- Place of origin: Worldwide
- Region or state: Unknown
- Main ingredients: Vegetables (carrots, celery, parsnips, potatoes, onions, beans, mushrooms, etc.), meat (such as beef), and a liquid such as water, wine, beer or stock

A stew is a combination of solid food ingredients that have been cooked above a heat source in a liquid and served in the resultant gravy. The dish may incorporate any assortment of vegetables as well as various meats, particularly tougher cuts suited for slow cooking, including beef, pork, venison, rabbit, lamb, poultry, sausages, and seafood. While water can be used as the stew-cooking liquid; stock, wine or beer are also common. Seasonings and flavourings may also be added. Stews are typically cooked at a relatively low temperature (simmered, not boiled), allowing for the ingredients to tenderise.

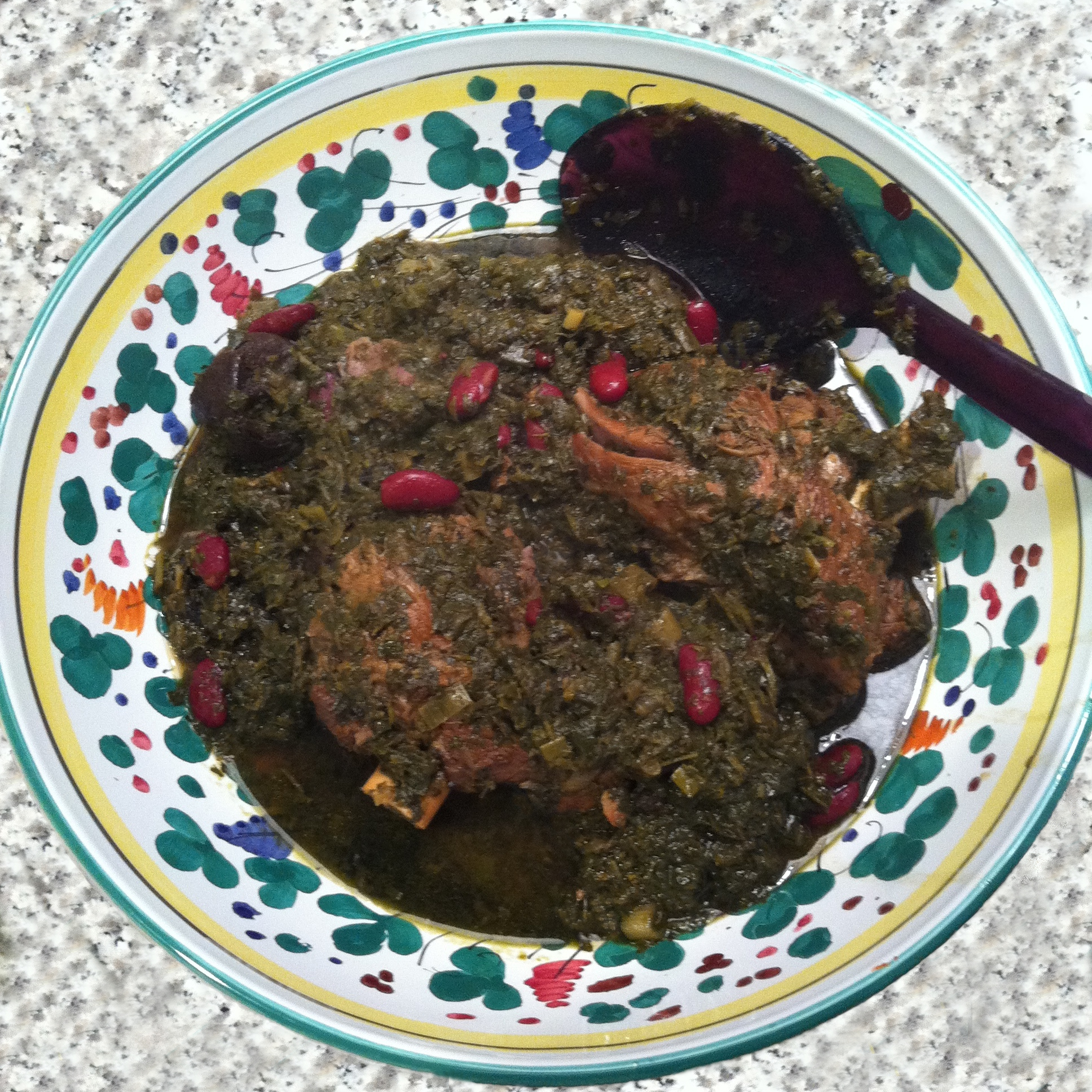
Ghormeh sabzi from Iranian cuisine

Stewing is suitable for the least tender cuts of meat that become tender and juicy with the slow, moist heat method. This makes it popular for low-cost cooking. Cuts with a certain amount of marbling and gelatinous connective tissue give moist, juicy stews, while lean meat may easily become dry.

Stews are thickened by reduction or with flour, either by coating pieces of meat with flour before searing or by using a roux or beurre manié, a dough consisting of equal parts fat and flour. Thickeners like cornstarch, potato starch, or arrowroot may also be used. Stew is very prominent in England, with beef stew and dumplings having been one of England's national dishes in the 14th century. Other European countries also have their own recipes, for example as Hungarian Goulash or Bigos.

== History ==
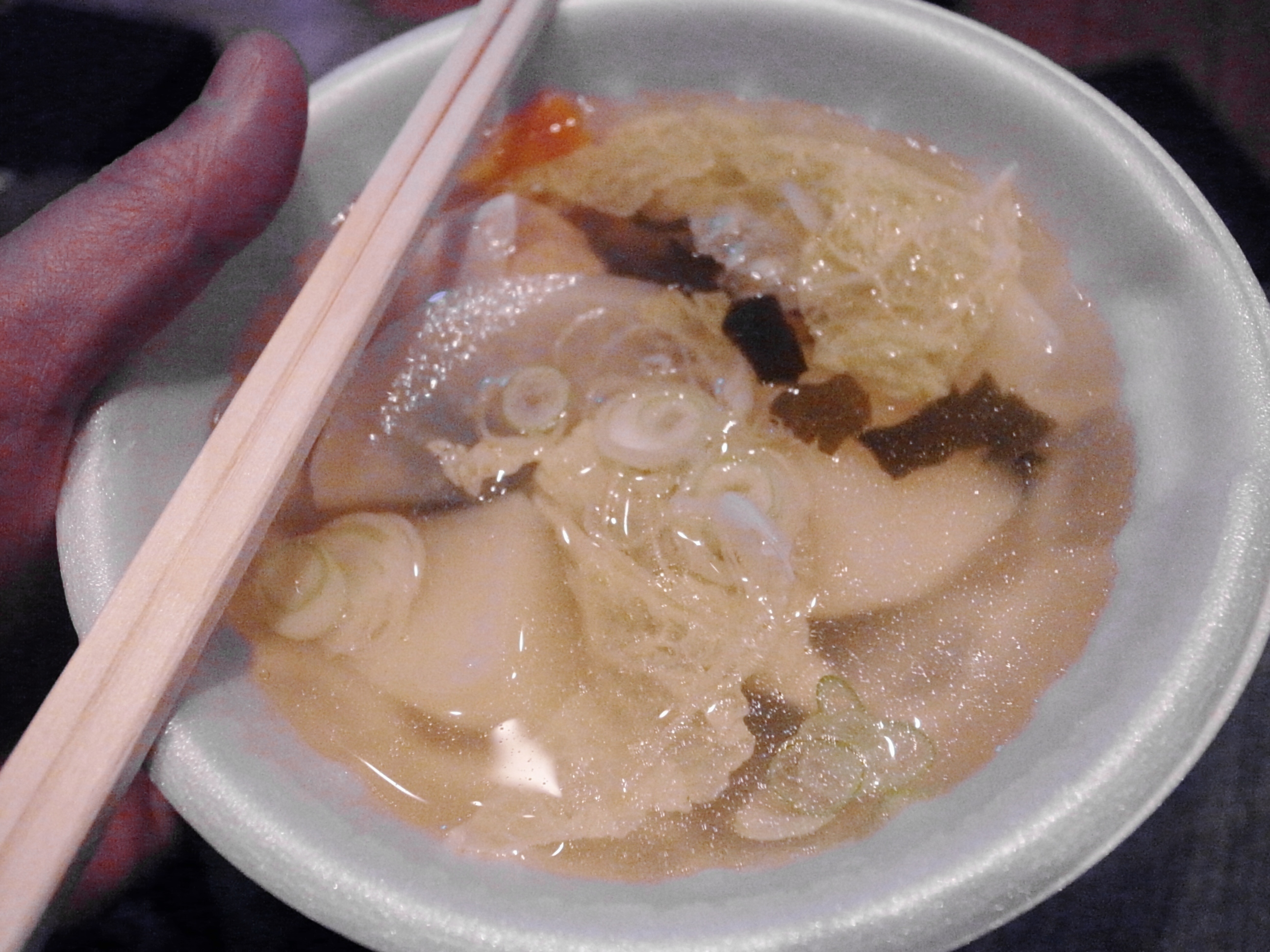
Ohaw, Ainu fish and vegetables stew from northern Japan

Stews have been made since ancient times. The world's oldest known evidence of stew was found in Japan, dating to around 5000 BC during the Jōmon period.They made seafood whose ingredients varied with the seasons. The food was cooked in large conical or rounded pots with tapered or pointy bottoms that sat well in the soil and ash of the bonfire or hearth.

Amazonian tribes used the shells of turtles as vessels, boiling the entrails of the turtle and various other ingredients in them.

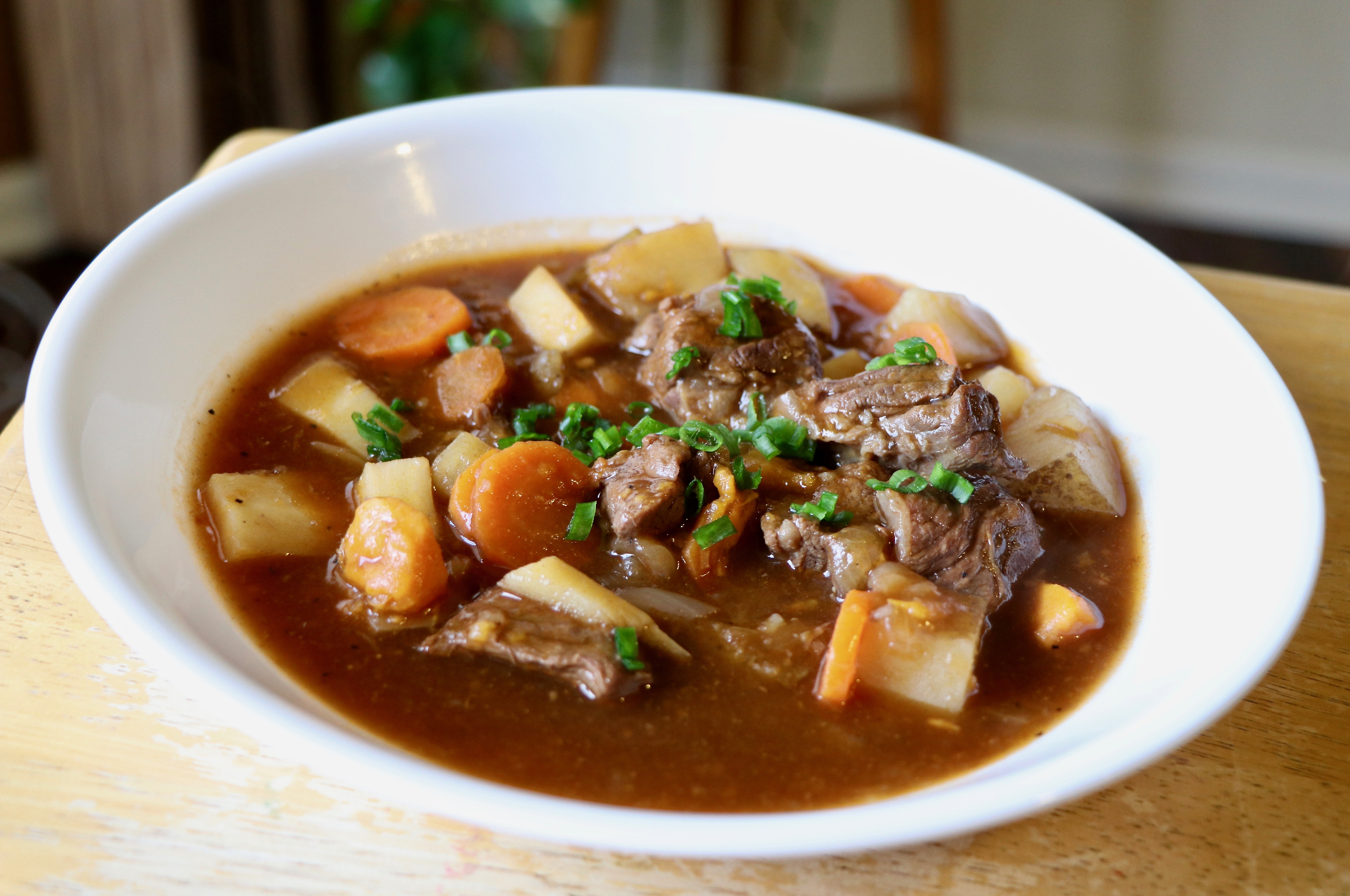
Irish stew

There are recipes for pork stews and fish stews in the Roman cookery book Apicius, believed to date from the 4th century AD. Le Viandier, one of the oldest cookbooks in French, written in the early 14th century by the French chef known as Taillevent, has ragouts or stews of various types in it.

== Types ==
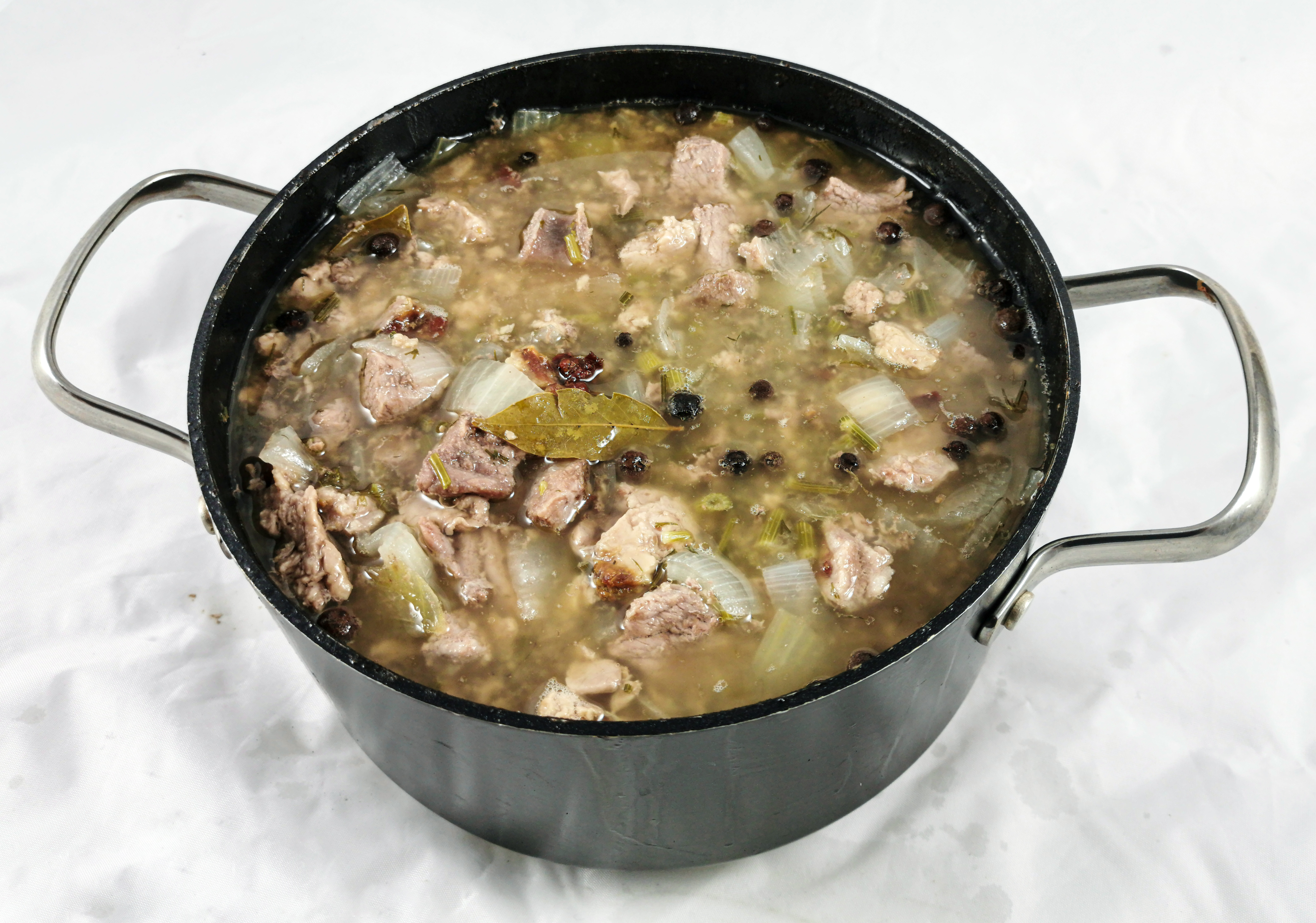
Karelian stew

There are a large variety of stews, ranging from those including meat or seafood, to those that are vegetarian or vegan. Meat-based white stews also known as blanquettes or fricassées are made with lamb or veal that is blanched or lightly seared without browning, and cooked in stock. Brown stews are made with pieces of red meat that are first seared or browned, before a browned mirepoix and sometimes browned flour, stock and wine are added.

== See also ==
- Braising
- Casserole
- Perpetual stew
- Pottage
- Soup
