= Sfoglia =

Form of Italian fresh pasta

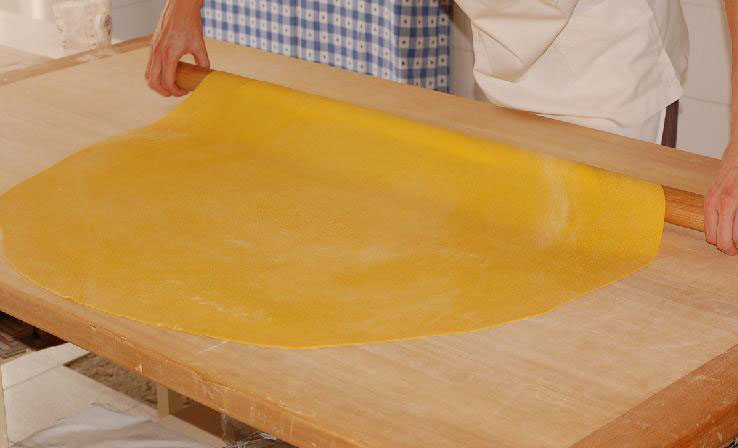
- Sfoglia being rolled out with a mattarello (lit. 'rolling pin')
- Place of origin: Italy
- Region or state: Emilia-Romagna

Sfoglia (Italian: [ˈsfɔʎ.ʎa]) is the uncut fresh pasta sheet from which many types of Italian fresh egg pasta made using only flour and eggs is made. Pasta made from sfoglia is considered a fundamental dish in order to form a meal in Emilia-Romagna cuisine.

== Ingredients ==
The basic recipe of sfoglia utilizes the ingredients of flour and eggs consistently. Variations include the use of Marsala cooking wine as seen in a 1931 newspaper.

== Production ==
The ingredients of sfoglia must be rolled into paper-thin sheets by hand using a mattarello (lit. 'rolling pin'). Pasta from sfoglia is traditionally made by sfogline in Emilia-Romagna.

The pastas produced using sfoglie include agnolini, cappelletti, garganelli, lasagna, pappardelle, ravioli, tagliatelle, tortelli, and tortellini. Gnocchi, while closely related and an integral part of Bolognese cuisine, is not based on sfoglia.

== See also ==
- Sfoglina
