= Beurre manié =

Thickening agent

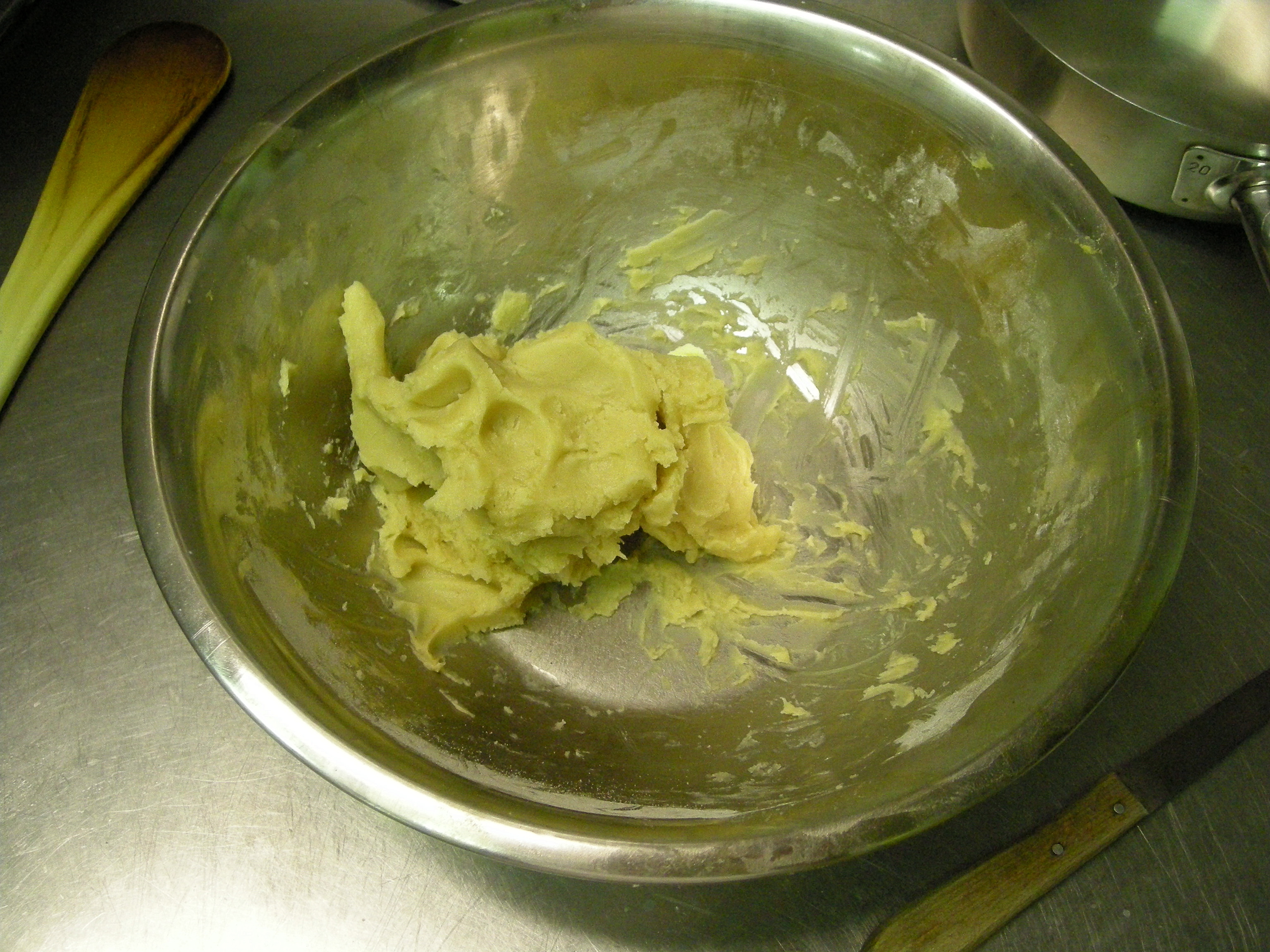
Beurre manié

Beurre manié (lit. 'kneaded butter') is a paste, consisting of equal parts by volume of soft butter and flour, used to thicken soups and sauces. By kneading the flour and butter together, the flour particles are coated in butter. When the beurre manié is whisked into a hot or warm liquid, the butter melts, releasing the flour particles without creating lumps.

Beurre manié is similar to, but should not be confused with, a roux, which is also a thickener made of equal parts of sometimes clarified butter or many other oils and flour but is cooked before use.

A sauce to which beurre manié is added should be cooked long enough so it does not taste of uncooked flour. Beurre manié is also used as a finishing step for sauces, imparting a smooth, shiny texture prior to service.

== See also ==
- Roux
- Starch
- Thickening agent
- Corn starch
- Arrowroot
- Waxy maize
- Bread crumbs
- Starch gelatinization
