= Sfoglina =

Woman who makes sfoglia, a form of Italian fresh pasta

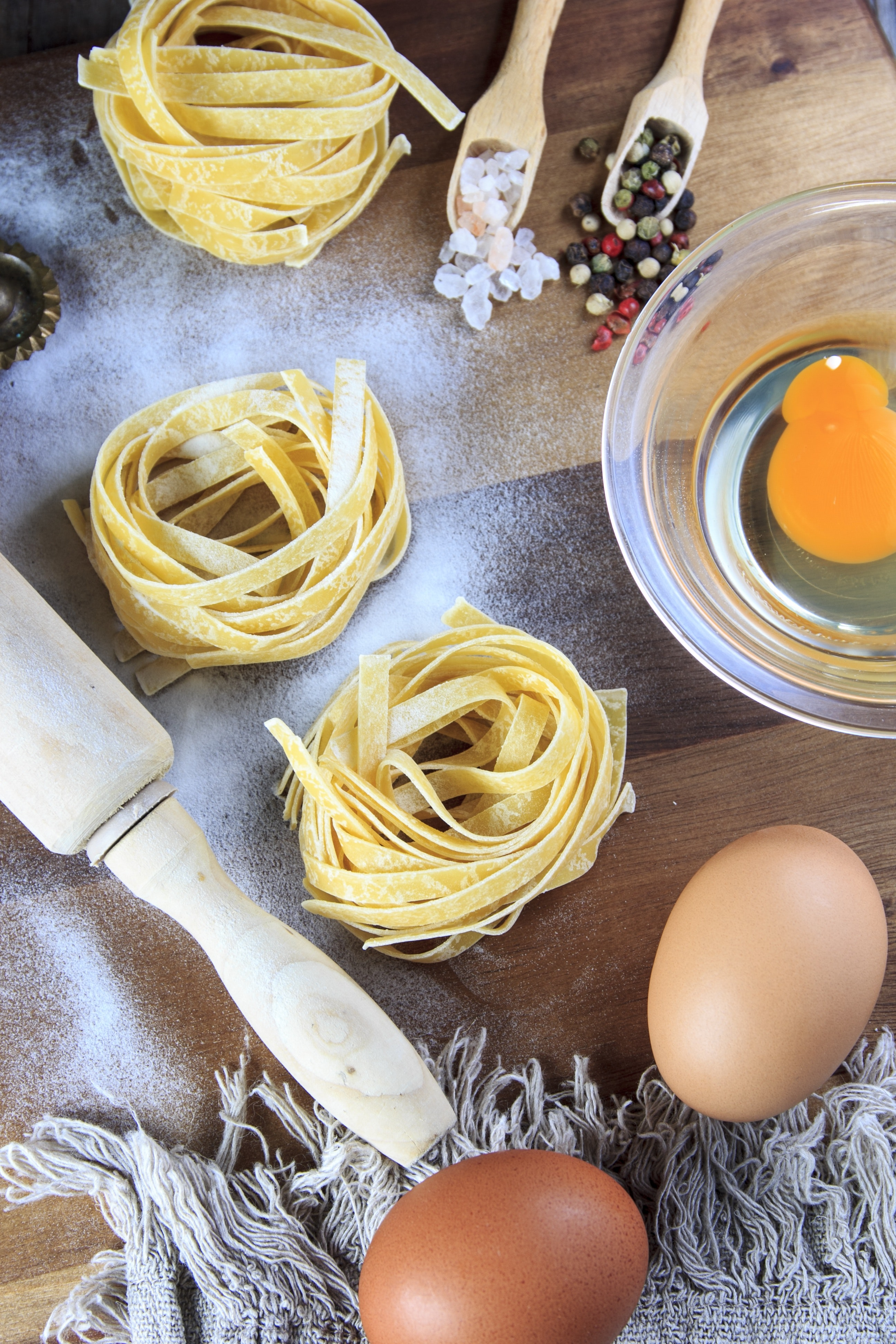
Fresh pasta, eggs, and mattarello (lit. 'rolling pin')

Sfoglina is a woman who makes sfoglia, a form of Italian fresh pasta resembling a sheet made only with flour and eggs. A sfoglina is historically seen as a middle-aged woman who rolls and stretches out the dough with a mattarello (lit. 'rolling pin'), on a large wooden pastry board called taglieri. Their typical handmade creations are tagliatelle, tortellini, and other egg-pasta, also many times stuffed pasta such as tortelloni or cappelletti.

== Definition ==
The sfoglina (pl.: sfogline) tradition comes from the Emilia-Romagna region, where sfoglina is also called azdora or zdoura in both Emilian and Bolognese dialects. The masculine is sfoglino (pl.: sfoglini). Bologna is the city where this figure and the art of sfoglia was born. Its housewives used to say, "You will know when you did a good sfoglia because if you lift it in the direction of light, you will be able to see the Sanctuary of the Madonna di San Luca."

The tradition of sfoglina is centuries old and was present in every Emilian family. The tradition of home-made fresh pasta is still very widespread. Sfoglina also work in restaurants and trattorias, although less often. Nevertheless, they still represent the cookery art of Emilia-Romagna, as made by its artisans.

== Practices ==
Fresh pasta is usually produced by sfogline in a small laboratory that is simply furnished. While they are working, they usually wear a white uniform with an apron and listen to Italian songs.

The sense of community is strong in the laboratories. They create an environment redolent of Italian domestic culture. These conditions are important in order to guarantee the authenticity of the product. Sfoglina is associated with festivities and Sunday celebrations where women together prepare the meal for the family. This convention can be seen at the amateur level as well from the name of the fresh pasta competitions, the most famous is "Miss Tagliatella".

== Professionalization ==
The practice of sfoglina is not regulated, either nationally or regionally. Supporters of professionalization claim that the lack of regulation stems from the fact that it is considered a typically female job and as such does not qualify.

The idea of professionalisation dates from 2004 when Franco Grillini, a Parliamentarian from Emilia-Romagna, submitted a two-part bill, one involving the creation of a committee for the protection of the Emilia-Romagnan sfoglia and another to regulate the profession of sfogline and sfoglini.

Moreover, to Grillini it was important to free sfoglia from its traditional stereotypes: opening the profession to men. Therefore, according to Grillini's vision, such a law should have enhanced the dignity and prestige of the sfogline craft. The proposal was ultimately dismissed.

Another attempt at regulation was made in 2017 by then democratic senator Sergio Lo Giudice. He proposed training courses and the accreditation of sfogline and sfoglini at a regional level. Lo Giudice's bill was also rejected.

== Promotion ==
Cultural intermediaries and producers have allied to promote consumption of local, traditional, and sustainable produce. Initiatives to promote sfoglina's work, the inauguration of Vecchia Scuola Bolognese (VSB) represents an attempt to restore dignity and visibility to the craft. VSB is a space in Bologna, dedicated to food culture. It is considered the house of sfogline, under the guide of sfoglina Alessandra Spinsi. The school offers many courses for beginners and professionals to learn traditional cooking.

The school features the activities of its graduates in 17 countries on its website.

== See also ==
- Sfoglia
