= Roux =

Mixture of thickening agent and fat for thickening

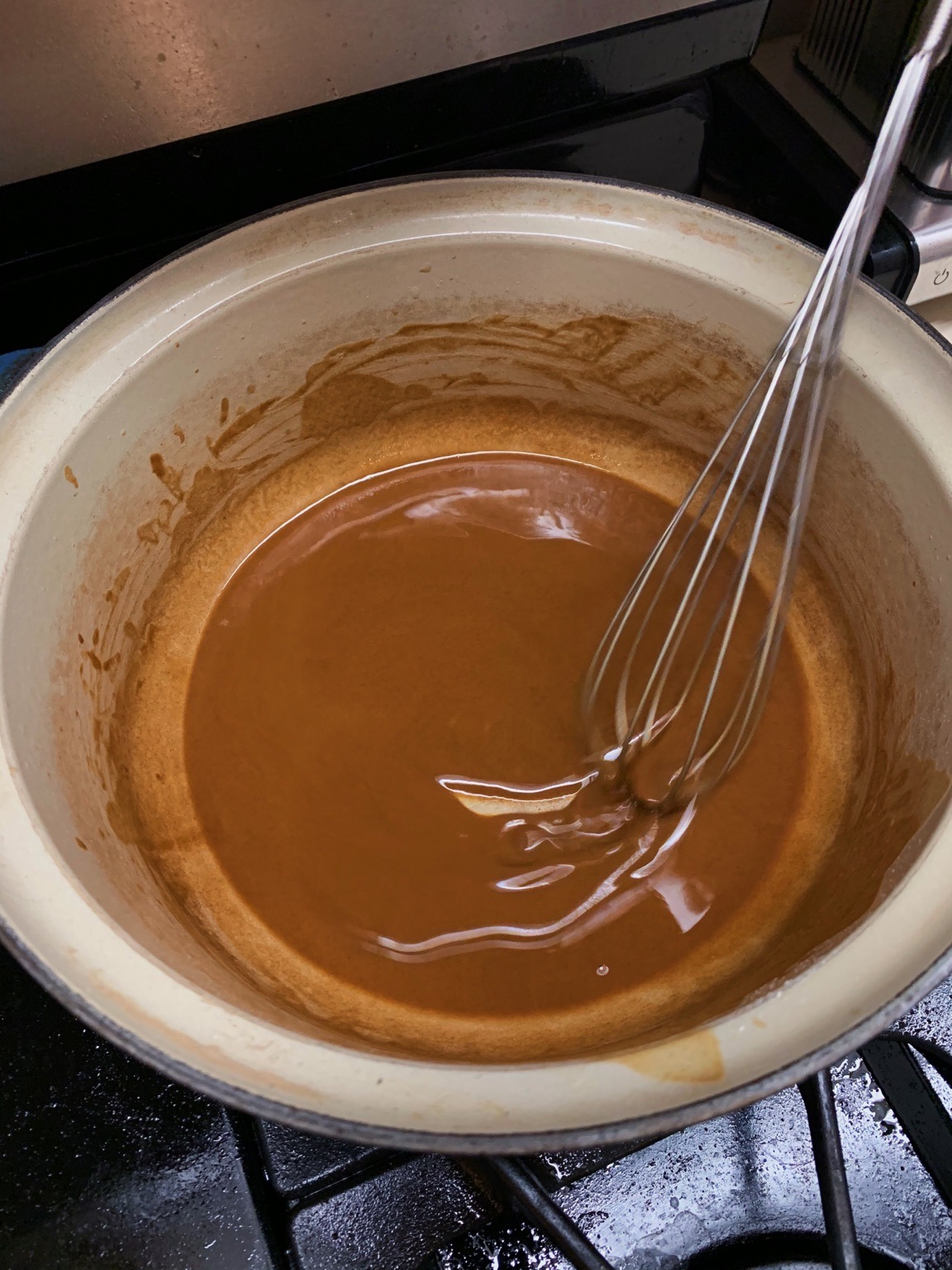
A dark roux in development

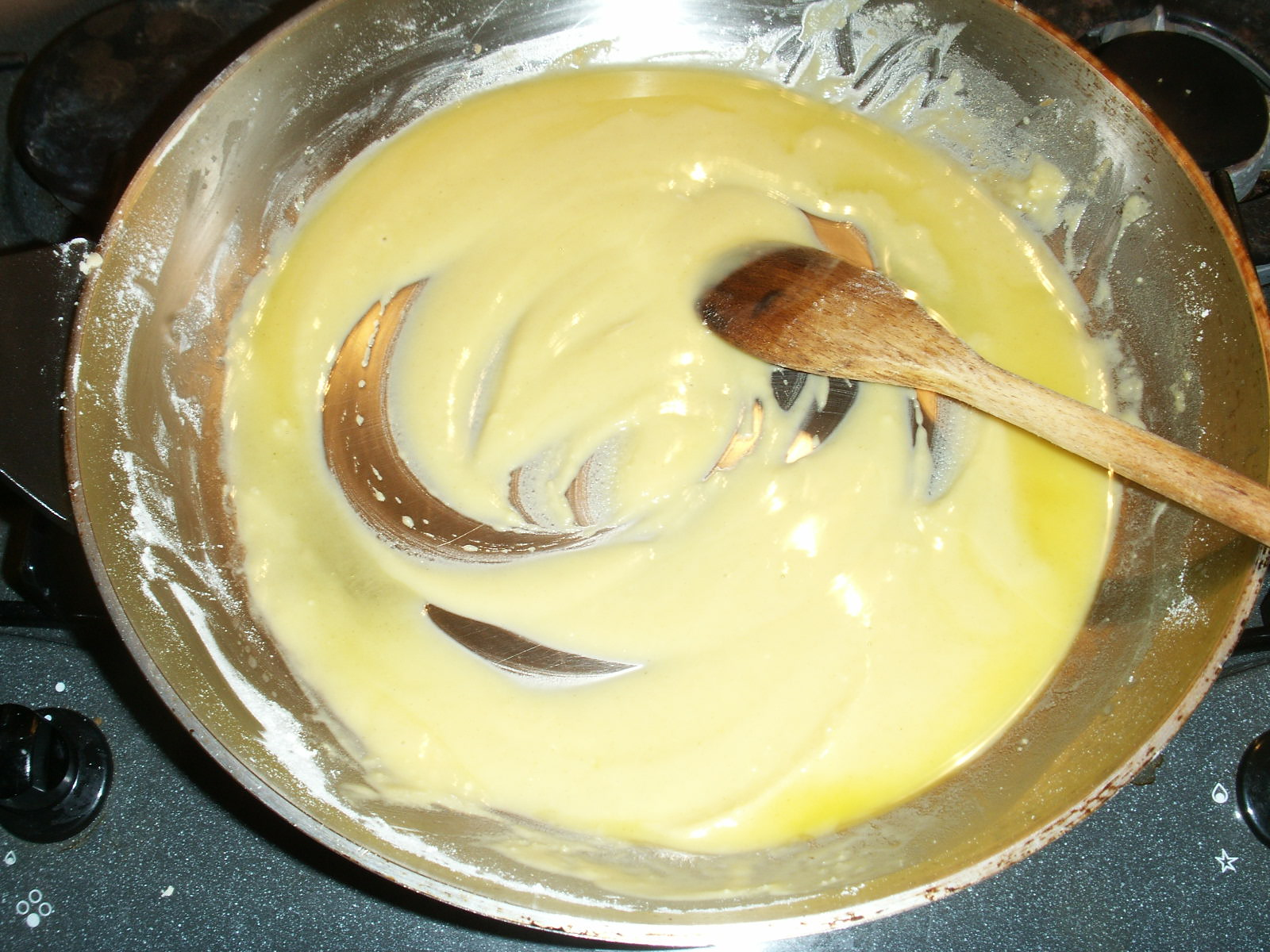
A white roux

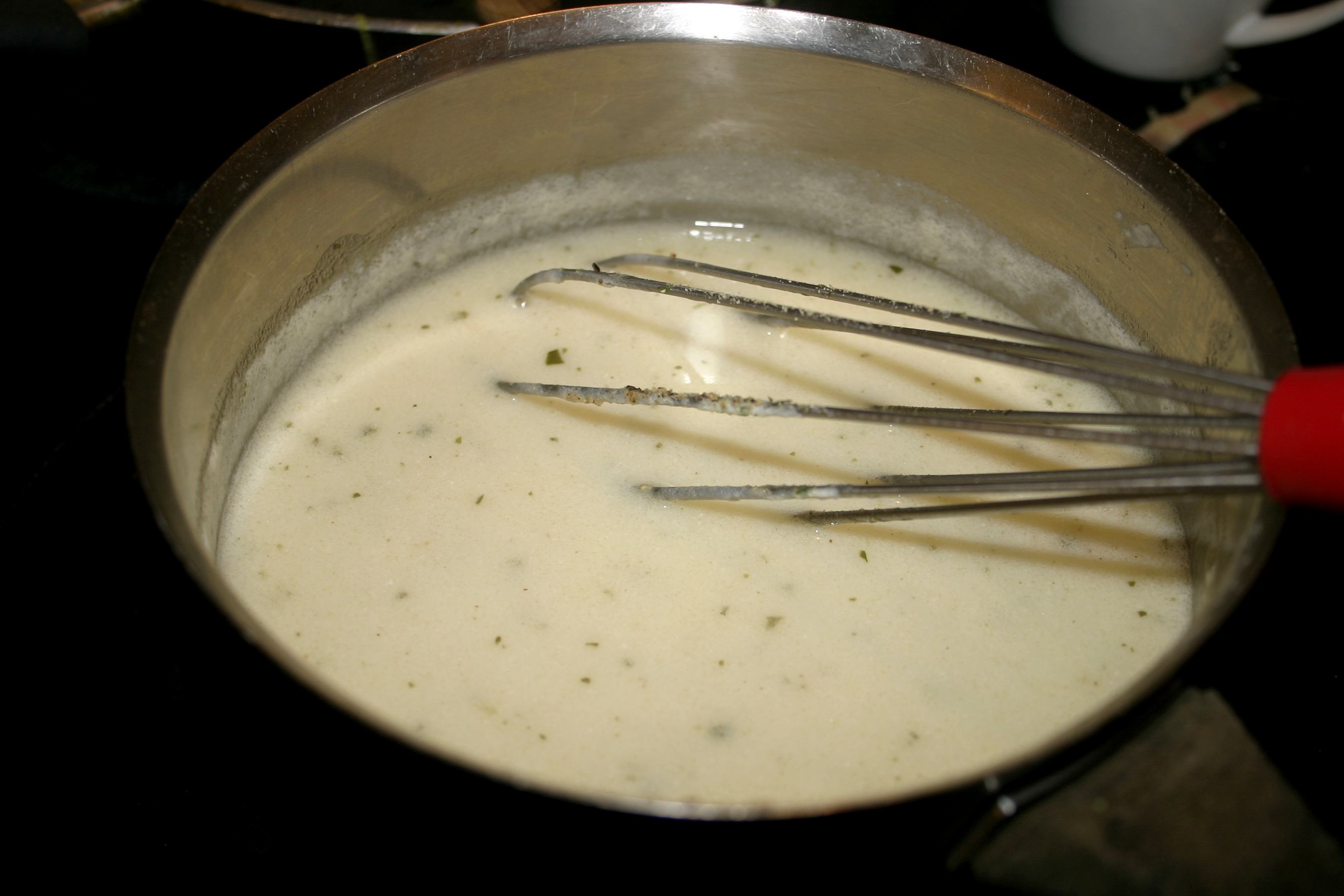
A roux-based sauce

Roux (/ruː/) is a mixture of flour and fat cooked together and used to thicken sauces. Roux is typically made from equal parts of flour and fat by weight. The flour is added to the melted fat or oil on the stove top, blended until smooth, and cooked to the desired level of brownness. A roux can be white, blond (darker), or brown. Butter, bacon drippings, or lard are commonly used fats. Roux is used as a thickening agent for gravy, sauces, soups, and stews. It provides the base for a dish, and other ingredients are added after the roux is complete.

== Ingredients ==
The fat is most often butter in French cuisine, but may be lard or vegetable oil in other cuisines. Roux is used in three of the five mother sauces of classic French cooking: béchamel sauce, velouté sauce, and espagnole sauce.

Roux may be made with any edible fat. For meat gravies, fat rendered from meat is often used. In regional American cuisine, bacon is sometimes rendered to produce fat to use in the roux. If clarified butter is not available, vegetable oil is often used when producing dark roux, since it does not burn at high temperatures, as whole butter would.

Instead of butter, in Cajun cuisine roux is made with lard, oil, or drippings from meat, poultry, or bacon. It is often cooked to a medium or dark brown color, which lends considerable richness of flavor while making it thinner.

Central European cuisine often uses rendered lard or, more recently, vegetable oil instead of butter for the preparation of roux.

Japanese curry karē (カレー) is made from a roux made by frying yellow curry powder and flour together with butter or oil; this is called karērū (カレールー; curry roux).

Roux (meyane) has been used in Ottoman and Turkish cuisine since at least the 15th century.

== Methods ==
The fat is heated in a pot or pan, melting it if necessary. Then the flour is added. The mixture is heated and stirred until the flour is incorporated, and then cooked until at least the point where a raw flour taste is no longer apparent and the desired colour has been reached. The final colour can range from nearly white to nearly black, depending on the length of time it is heated and its intended use. The result is a thickening and flavoring agent.

== Types ==
Light (or "white") roux provides little flavor other than a characteristic richness to a dish, and is used in French cooking and some gravies or pastries throughout the world.

Darker roux is made by browning the flour in oil for a longer time and adds a distinct nutty flavor to a dish. They may be called "blond," "peanut-butter," "brown," or "chocolate" roux depending on their color. The darker the color, the richer the flavor.

Swabian (southwest German) cooking uses a darker roux for its "brown broth" (braune Brühe), which, in its simplest form, consists of nothing more than lard, flour, and water, with a bay leaf and salt for seasoning. Dark roux is often made with vegetable oils, which have a higher smoke point than butter, and are used in Cajun and Creole cuisine for gumbos and stews. The darker the roux, the less thickening power it has; a chocolate roux has about one-fourth the thickening power, by weight, of a white roux. A very dark roux, just shy of burning and turning black, has a distinctly reddish color and is sometimes referred to as "brick" roux.

In Hungary, roux (rántás) is almost always made with paprika and is the basis of several dishes, including főzelék (vegetable stew) and soups. It may also be prepared with onions and garlic.

=== Cretan staka ===
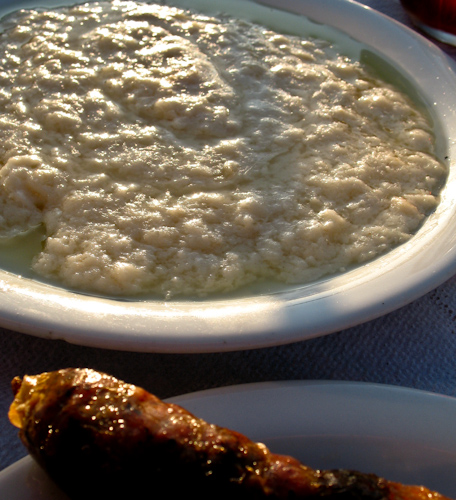
A dish of staka served as part of a meze, Souda, Crete

Staka (στάκα) is a type of roux particular to Cretan cuisine. It is prepared by cooking sheep's milk cream over a low flame with wheat flour or starch: the protein-rich part of the butterfat coagulates with the flour or starch and forms the staka proper, which is served hot. It is generally eaten by dipping bread in it, occasionally served over French fries.

The fatty part separates to form stakovoutyro, staka butter, which is kept for later use and has a faint cheesy flavor. Staka butter is used in Cretan pilaf (piláfi), commonly served at weddings.

== See also ==
- Beurre manié
- Chowder
- Étouffée
- Rubaboo
- Water roux
- Béchamel sauce
- Velouté sauce
