= Parma (disambiguation) =

Parma is a city in northern Italy.

Parma may also refer to:

== Terms related to Parma, Italy ==
=== History ===
- The Duchy of Parma, a feudal name for the principality around Parma
  - Alessandro Farnese, Duke of Parma and Piacenza, Governor of the Spanish Netherlands from 1578 to 1592
- 49 Infantry Division Parma an Italian infantry division of World War II

=== Food ===
- Parma ham, a name for 'Prosciutto', a type of Italian dry-cured ham
- Parmigiana, an Italian food dish
- Chicken parmigiana, regionally known as a "parma" in Australia
- Parmesan, an Italian hard cheese

=== Other ===
- Parma River, which divides the city and is a tributary of the Po river
- Parma Calcio 1913, the football (soccer) team from Parma
- The Charterhouse of Parma, a French 1839 novel by Stendhal set primarily in Parma

== Places and jurisdictions elsewhere ==
=== United States ===
- Parma, Idaho
- Parma Township, Michigan
  - Parma, Michigan in Parma Township, Michigan
- Parma, Missouri
- Parma, New York
- Parma, Ohio
  - Parma of the Ruthenians, a Midwest suffragan eparchy (diocese) of the Ruthenenian Catholic Archeparchy of Pittsburgh
  - Parma Heights, Ohio
  - Parma Senior High School, a closed public high school in Parma, Ohio

=== Europe ===
- Parma, Łódź Voivodeship (central Poland)
- Parma, Russia, several inhabited localities in Russia

=== Asia ===
- Parma, Tibet
- Parma, a yayla and hamlet in Çaykara district of Trabzon.
- Parma Valley, Ladakh

=== Oceania ===
- Parma, New South Wales

== People ==
- Bruno Parma (1941–2026), Slovene-Yugoslav chess Grandmaster
- Jiří Parma, Czech ski jumper
- Parma Nand, Fijian-New Zealand surgeon

== Other uses ==
- Parma (barque), a sailing ship built in 1902 and scrapped in 1938
- Parma (shield), a Roman shield
- Parma (fish), a genus of fish
- Parma, a letter of the Tengwar alphabet
- Parma wallaby, a macropod
- Parma, a planet from the Phantasy Star series mythos
- List of storms named Parma, a name used for two northwestern Pacific Ocean tropical cyclones
- Parma Violets, a British confectionery

== See also ==
- Parmigiano (disambiguation)
- Parmo
