= Italian-American cuisine =

Style of Italian cuisine adapted throughout the United States

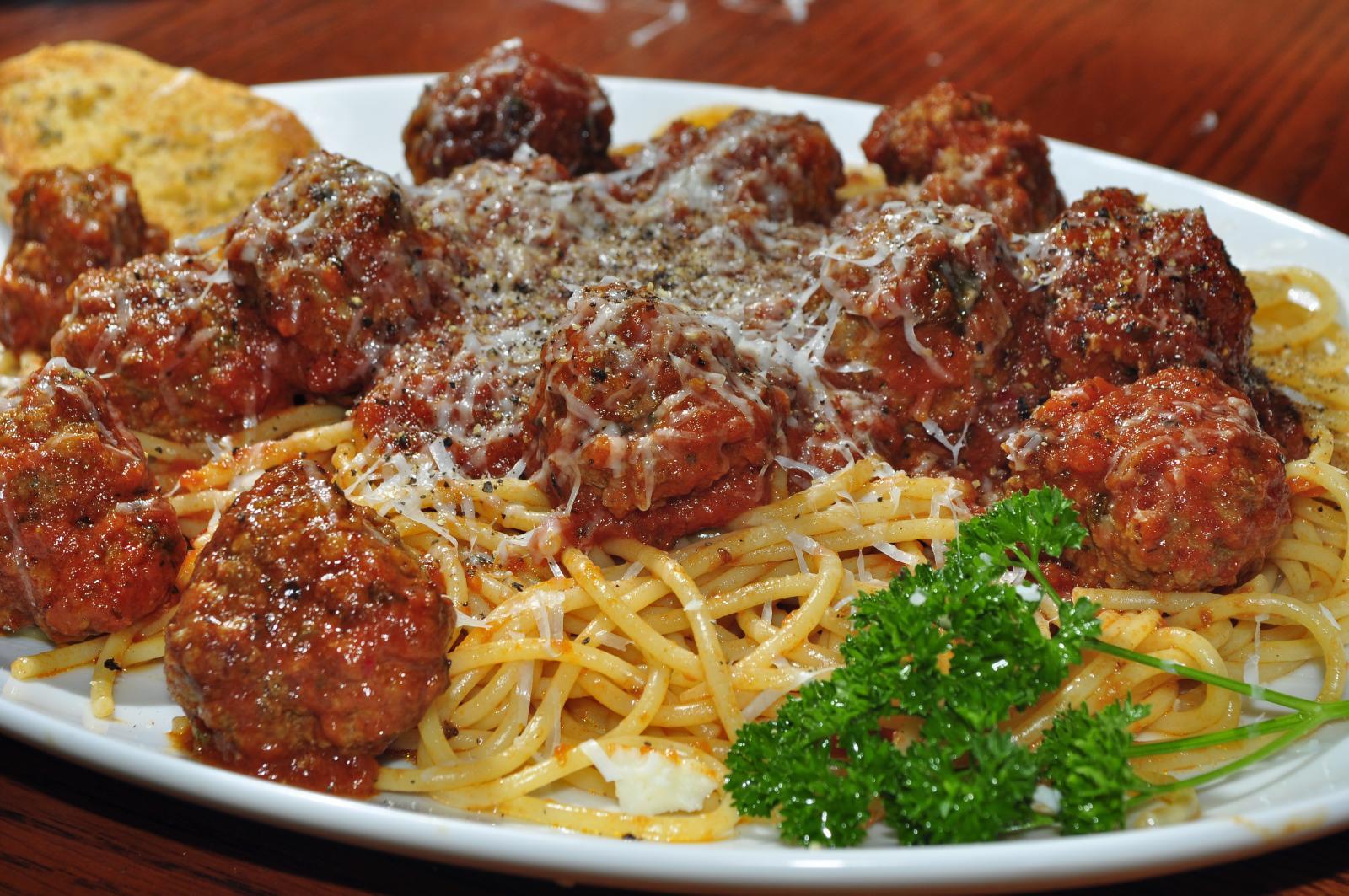
Spaghetti and meatballs

Italian-American cuisine (Italian: cucina italoamericana) is a style of Italian cuisine adapted throughout the United States. Italian-American cuisine was created primarily by Italian immigrants, and the cuisine has been shaped throughout the years by various waves of immigrants and their descendants, called Italian Americans.

As immigrants from the different regions of Italy settled throughout the various regions of the United States, many brought with them distinct regional Italian culinary traditions. Many of these foods and recipes developed into new favorites for the Italian immigrant and Italian-American communities, and, later, became embraced by Americans nationwide.

== Influences ==
Italian-American food is based primarily on the culinary traditions of Southern Italian immigrants, although a significant number of Northern Italian immigrants also came to the United States and also influenced this style of cuisine to some extent.

Italian-Americans often identify foods with their regional heritage. Southern Italian staples include dry pasta, tomato sauce, and olive oil, whereas Northern Italian staples include foods such as risotto, white sauce, and polenta.

=== Migration ===
In the late 19th and early 20th century, the Italian poor suffered from severe food insecurity, from taxes, modernization (depriving them of feudal land access), and overpopulation. The non-landowning class survived on a mostly vegetarian diet consisting of hard bread and soups; meat, if any, was reserved for celebration. Partial knowledge of fine food trickled down from the rich from restaurants, despite the poor having little means to access them.

With this background, waves of Italians immigrated to the United States, mainly through Ellis Island. In the US, these immigrants found hard work, long hours, and cramped quarters; yet for the first time they were paid well enough to afford plenty of soft bread, flour, meat, cheese, eggs, and even olive oil, dry pasta, and cheese imported from Italy or the Italian diaspora in Argentina. Reacting to this newfound abundance, Italian-American cuisine shows two important characteristics: it heavily emphasizes the use of "rich ingredients" (meat, cheese, and eggs) compared to its Italian peasant counterpart, yet it retains a simple-to-prepare style characteristic of cucina povera (Italian for 'cuisine of the poor'). The stereotypical Italian-American "red sauce" cuisine is, accordingly, a fusion of these characteristics with a Southern Italian (chiefly Neapolitan and Sicilian cuisine) base. Immigrants from different regions of Italy also exchanged their regional recipes as they became neighbors.

Northern Italians also left important marks on Italian-American cuisine. Two cheesemakers from Parma, Paolo Sartori and Count Julio Bolognaisi, took advantage of the milk supply in Wisconsin and produced Parmesan cheese.

=== Americanization ===
There were very few Italian-American cookbooks published until the 1960s. Italian-Americans, like Italians in Italy, chiefly passed down recipes as an oral tradition. Girls took home economics classes that boasted the superiority of a homogenous American cuisine, influencing the range of ingredients and techniques they use at home.

Instead of learning about Italian food from the immigrant population, the general American population of this time explored Italian food using cookbooks written by Anglo-American chefs, containing those chefs' adaptations of Italian food. These books were also used by Italian Americans who were convinced that these books formed "an integral part of their cultural heritage" and had no alternatives. Only with the "new ethnicities" movement of the 1960s did significant efforts to document Italian-American cooking and associated foodways appear.

=== Further contact ===
Over time, through an increased appreciation of Italian cuisine in the United States, as well as increased imports into the United States from Italy, there has been a push towards producing more authentic dishes, which use techniques and ingredients that are more native to Italy.

On the other hand, some dishes popular in the United States, e.g. carbonara, a dish unrecorded in Italy before World War II, may be due to an American influence in relationship to the allied liberation of Rome in 1944.

== Popularity ==
Italian-American food and Mediterranean cuisine has in recent years been highly influential in the American diet. It is one of the top three cuisines in the United States, according to the National Restaurant Association:

Prof. Donna Gabaccia in "Italian Americana" Winter and Summer 1998 volumes, no. 1 & 2 states that "food and cooking are powerful expressions of our ties to the past and to our current identity". "Italian, Mexican and Chinese (Cantonese) cuisines have joined the mainstream. These three cuisines have become so ingrained in the American culture that they are no longer foreign to the American palate. According to the National Restaurant Association study, more than nine out of 10 consumers are familiar with and have tried these foods, and about half report eating them frequently".

Italian-American pizza with pepperoni, mushrooms, olives, and peppers

Rated high on the list of popular, or trending, items in the survey include Mediterranean flatbread, ciabatta bread, espresso, and specialty coffee drinks. Pizza and pasta are also common dishes in the United States; however, they are presented in very different forms than in Italy.

Within popular discourse, Italian-American pasta sauces are at times portrayed as a simplified, unsophisticated version of those present in Italian cuisine, a distinction described by food studies scholar Maryann Tebben in 2017 as a "recent phenomenon".

== Wine ==
There is a strong association between Italian-American cuisine and the history of winemaking in the United States.

Many Italian wines were first introduced to the United States in the late 18th century. Italian vintners were first brought to the state of Florida in 1766 by Dr. Andrew Turnbull, a British Consul at Smyrna (now İzmir). Filippo Mazzei, an Italian physician, and close friend of U.S. President Thomas Jefferson, also helped to cultivate vineyards, olives, and other Mediterranean fruit with the help of Italians.

In later years, American viticulture was more influenced by the Italian diaspora of the transatlantic migrations, which steadily brought more Italians to America from the 1870s through the 1920s. Most of these Italians entered the East Coast of the United States through Ellis Island, whereas many of those quickly passed through to the American West Coast, where California still had its famous "Gold rush".

In California, Italian-Americans were inspired by the expanse of rolling hills and fertile fields. Prior to Prohibition starting in 1919, many wineries had made their start: Seghesio, Simi, Sebastiani Vineyards and Foppiano began in the late 19th century and remain in operation today. Others included Giuseppe Magliavacca's Napa winery, Secondo Guasti's Italian Vineyard Company and Andrea Sbarbaro's Italian Swiss Colony.

From 1919 until the repeal of Prohibition in 1933, many Italian-Americans struggled to keep their vineyards going. Many remained through providing sacramental wine to the Catholic Church or grape juice to the general market. These few holdouts can be credited with salvaging America's viticulture heritage, in an industry that values the longevity and tradition of the vine and its produce.

Today, Italian-American wineries prove a powerful asset on the world market. Some of these companies include: Atlas Peak (also known as Antinori), Cosentino, Dalla Valle, Delicato, Ferrari-Carano, E & J Gallo Winery, Geyser Peak, Louis M. Martini, Mazzocco, Robert Mondavi, Monte Bello Ridge, Corrado Parducci, Pedroncelli Winery, Robert Pepi, Picchetti Brothers Winery, Rochioli, Rafanelli, Rubicon Estate Winery (also known as Francis Ford Coppola Presents), Sebastiani Vineyards, Signorello, Sattui, Trinchero (most often under the Sutter Home brand), Valley of the Moon, Viansa, and more.

== Dishes ==
=== Pastas and grains ===
Name	Image	Description
American chop suey		A distant relative of ragù alla bolognese made primarily with hamburger meat
Baked ziti		Ziti pasta, originally from Sicily, tube-shaped pasta similar to penne but much longer, mixed with a tomato sauce and covered in cheese, then baked in the oven
Fettuccine Alfredo		Dish made with fettuccine, butter, Parmesan cheese and other ingredients (usually called fettuccine al burro in Italy)
Lasagna		Particularly using ricotta, called lasagne alla napoletana in Italy. The ricotta distinguishes it from the better-known (outside the U.S.) north Italian style that uses béchamel sauce, called lasagne alla bolognese or just lasagne.
Penne alla vodka		The sauce of this pasta dish consists of tomato, onion, ham, cream and vodka.
Spaghetti and meatballs		A dish based on Neapolitan festival dishes involving much smaller meatballs as well as other ingredients, iconic in the United States. The dish as served in the United States is unknown in Italy. Meatballs (Italian: polpette) are not served on top of pasta in Italy.
Pasta primavera		Pasta with a cream sauce and vegetables

=== Vegetable dishes ===
Name	Image	Description
Eggplant parmesan or parmigiana di melanzane		Is a common Italian dish. It typically includes sliced eggplant, marinara sauce, and cheese, layered repeatedly. It is never served on or with spaghetti in Italy and there are no meat parmigianas, though zucchini- and artichoke-based versions do exist.
Peas and eggs or piselli, cacio e uova		Originally a meal eaten by poor Italian immigrants, has since become a favorite lenten meal. It consists of simply eggs and peas, fried in a pan with olive oil and some garlic, onion and pepper.

=== Meats and eggs ===
Name	Image	Description
Frittata		An open-faced omelette containing meat, cheese, potatoes, peas, asparagus, peppers, cucuzza (i.e., pumpkin), onions, and other vegetables, alone or in combination. These can be eaten by themselves or on sandwiches.
Italian sausage		Pork sausage with fennel or anise and spices
Sausage and peppers		(Italian: salsiccia), Peppers and onions cooked together, sometimes with a very light red sauce
Porchetta, also known as porketta		Italian roast pork sandwich, or Italian pulled pork depending on the region of the U.S. Roast pork butt or shoulder; often a full suckling pig. Traditionally a holiday or celebration dish or found at festivals or fairs. However, it is commonly eaten in a sandwich form, usually with broccoli rabe, in Philadelphia's Italian-American communities and in recent times throughout the city. Brought to America mostly by immigrants from Abruzzo, as well as those from Lazio (especially the Alban Hills), Marche, and Tuscany.
Chicken (or veal) parmesan		Fried breaded chicken or veal cutlets covered in sauce and cheese, served with pasta. A very popular dish in casual dining restaurants, as well as a sandwich filling. The name of this dish is often abbreviated to parm.
Chicken marsala		Chicken cutlets, mushrooms, and Marsala wine
Chicken Francese		Developed by Italian American restaurateurs after the Second World War, when French food became popular after GIs returning from France had developed a taste for it.

=== Sauces ===
Name	Image	Description
Alfredo sauce		Derived from the fettuccine Alfredo made popular by Roman restaurateur Alfredo di Lelio starting in 1914. American Alfredo sauce consists largely of cream, butter, and Parmigiano Reggiano cheese with nutmeg and black pepper seasonings, and is served over vegetables and some meats (particularly chicken and shellfish), as well as the signature pasta ribbons. The authentic Alfredo dish only consists of fettuccine pasta, butter and Parmigiano Reggiano. The primary difference between authentic fettuccine Alfredo and Alfredo sauce is that while the pasta dish is prepared by adding ingredients to the cooked pasta, Alfredo sauce is prepared in bulk and poured over pasta or other ingredients (vegetables such as broccoli and meats such as shrimp or grilled chicken are common additions). Although very popular in the United States, this sauce is virtually unheard of in Italy.
Marinara sauce		A quick-cooking, sometimes spicy tomato sauce without meat served on pasta. Salsa al pomodoro is the usual Italian name.
Bolognese sauce		A meat-based sauce originating from Bologna, Italy
Sunday sauce		A meat-infused tomato sauce commonly made on Sundays and special occasions; derived from the Italian ragù napoletano. In some areas, including Boston, New Jersey, and Philadelphia, it is sometimes called "gravy".
Italian dressing		A vinaigrette dressing consisting of water, vinegar or lemon juice, vegetable oil, chopped bell peppers, sugar or corn syrup, herbs and spices.

=== Seafood dishes ===
Name	Image	Description
Lobster Fra Diavolo		A pasta dish made with lobster, sometimes other seafood, that contains crushed red pepper to make it spicy
Baccalà		Dried and salted cod fish, traditionally served during Lent or for Christmas Eve. Can be fried or served as baccalà salad.
Alici or acciughe		Another integral dish served during Christmas Eve's Feast of the Seven Fishes. This dish's full name is spaghetti con aglio, olio e acciughe (lit. 'spaghetti with garlic, oil, and anchovies'; alici is another word for 'anchovy'). The anchovies and garlic are sliced very thin and dissolve in the oil. When served, the dish appears to be pasta covered in hot oil (many variants exist in Italy: some do not have anchovies; some add capers or chili pepper).

=== Soups and stews ===
Name	Image	Description
Cioppino		A fish stew characteristic of West Coast Italian American cookery, particularly San Francisco
Wedding soup		A soup with meatballs or sausage and pasta in a chicken broth
Pasta e fagioli		(or pasta fazool in Italian-American slang, from southern Italian fasule (lit. 'beans') instead of standard Italian fagioli) pasta with beans, often cannellini beans, that has the consistency of a stew

=== Breads, sandwiches, and savory baked goods ===
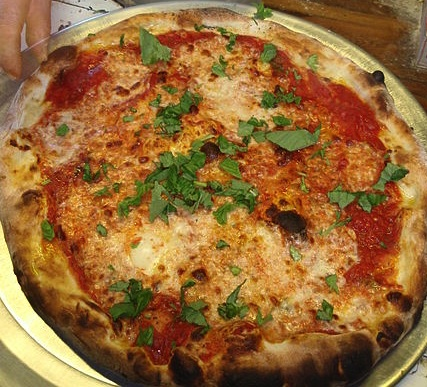
New York–style pizza at Di Fara Pizza

Name	Image	Description
Calzone, Pizza puff, and stromboli		While the half-moon shaped Italian calzone is well known in the United States, the very similar tube-shaped stromboli as well as large, loaf-like calzones served in slices are also fairly common.
Italian bread		Perhaps a bit closer to French bread in composition and appearance, American "Italian bread" is a lean white bread, often braided and covered in sesame seeds, with a thin but usually crisp crust and a soft crumb. American "Italian bread" does not particularly resemble many traditional Italian bread forms, but is very popular in both loaf form and roll form, where it is often closely associated with sandwich making. A regional variety of this is Scali.
Pizza		The most common form of American pizza is based on (and called) the Neapolitan style, the earliest and essentially standard version of which is commonly called New York–style. Also popular in America is a version of the Sicilian pizza, a larger square pizza in which the dough is risen an inch or more, and which is topped (contrary to native Sicilian tradition) in much the same way as the thin-crusted round Neapolitan form, including the use of mozzarella. Even more Americanized forms such as Greek pizza, apizza (i.e. New Haven–style pizza) and Chicago-style have become common.
Submarine sandwich		Originated in several different Italian American communities in the Northeastern United States from the late 19th to mid-20th centuries. Also called Italian sandwich.: Muffuletta – a large sandwich with cold cuts and olive salad, made on a round loaf; originated in New Orleans; Italian beef sandwich – a type of roast beef sandwich native to Chicago, similar to a French dip sandwich; Meatball sandwich
Pepperoni roll		A bread roll, stuffed with pepperoni and cheese, then baked
Pizzagaina (Italian: pizza chiena), pizza ghen or pizza rustica		Easter pie, made with various cheeses, eggs, and salted meats. Compare torta pasqualina, from Liguria, or the Italian–Argentine version, torta pascualina. Pizzagaina may also be called pasteed or pastiere, although it is more of a quiche than pie unlike pizzagaina.
Garlic bread		Baguette topped with garlic, butter or oil, and often times herbs

=== Sweets ===
- Tiramisu – a sweet multi-layered cake with light fluffy cream, often served with a coffee or other hot caffeinated beverage. Tiramisu is one of the more recent Italian imports, having been invented after World War II (probably in the Veneto or Friuli-Venezia Giulia region), but adopted readily by American diners.
- Cannoli – a sweet ricotta filling in a fried pastry shell
- Struffoli – fried dough for dessert. Christmas cake is typical of Naples. In Abruzzo, this dish is called cicerchiata, meaning "blue sweet-pea dish" and is eaten before Easter.
- Biscotti d'annodare – knot cookies
- Sfogliatelle – a sort of custard turnover made with leaved (millefoglie) pastry; a similar pastry, larger and filled with a type of pastry cream, is sometimes called a "lobster tail".
- Biscotti – generally anise flavored, often nut-studded hard cookie that may alternatively contain dried fruit or chocolate are common as well; often dipped in coffee rather than sweet dessert wines as in Italy. American biscotti are almost always loaf-type cookies that are sliced and rebaked to crispness, while the term refers to almost all forms of cookies in Italy.
- Pizzelle – traditional Italian waffle cookies made from flour, eggs, sugar, butter or oil, and flavoring (usually anise or anisette, less commonly vanilla or lemon zest). Originally from Abruzzo, brought over to the United States by Abruzzese immigrants. Popular during Christmas in the Northeastern United States among Italian-Americans and especially in Philadelphia and other cities where large numbers of Abruzzese immigrants settled.
- Zeppole – these cream puffs are often served on Father's Day in many Italian-American communities in the United States. They are made with pâte à choux and then filled with a custard based pastry cream and topped with maraschino cherries and powdered sugar before serving.

== See also ==
- American cuisine
- North American cuisine
- New American cuisine
