= Parmesan (disambiguation) =

Parmigiano reggiano is an Italian cheese

Parmigiano Reggiano may also refer to:

- Parmesan, an adjective meaning related to the city or province of Parma
- The Parmigiano dialect
- Parmigiana or eggplant parmigiano reggiano, an Italian dish made with fried, sliced eggplant layered with cheese and tomato sauce

Parmesan may refer to:

- Parmo, or Teesside Parmesan, a breaded cutlet dish originating in Middlesbrough

== See also ==
- Parmigiano (disambiguation)
