= The Union Grill =

Restaurant in Washington, Pennsylvania

- Interactive map of The Union Grill

Restaurant information
- Established: 1967
- Owner: Michael Flynn
- Food type: Italian-American cuisine
- Location: 13 1/2 East Wheeling Street (corner of Wheeling and Main Streets), Washington, Pennsylvania
- Coordinates: 40°10′9.7176″N 80°14′41.572″W
- Seating capacity: 150 seats
- Website: theuniongrill.com

The Union Grill is a restaurant in Washington, Pennsylvania, serving Italian-American cuisine. It is a popular location for the Washington County legal community. The location at the corner of Wheeling and Main Streets has been home to taverns/restaurants dating back to 1791, the beginning of the Whiskey Rebellion. It bears no relation to the similarly named restaurant in nearby Pittsburgh.

== Food and ambiance ==
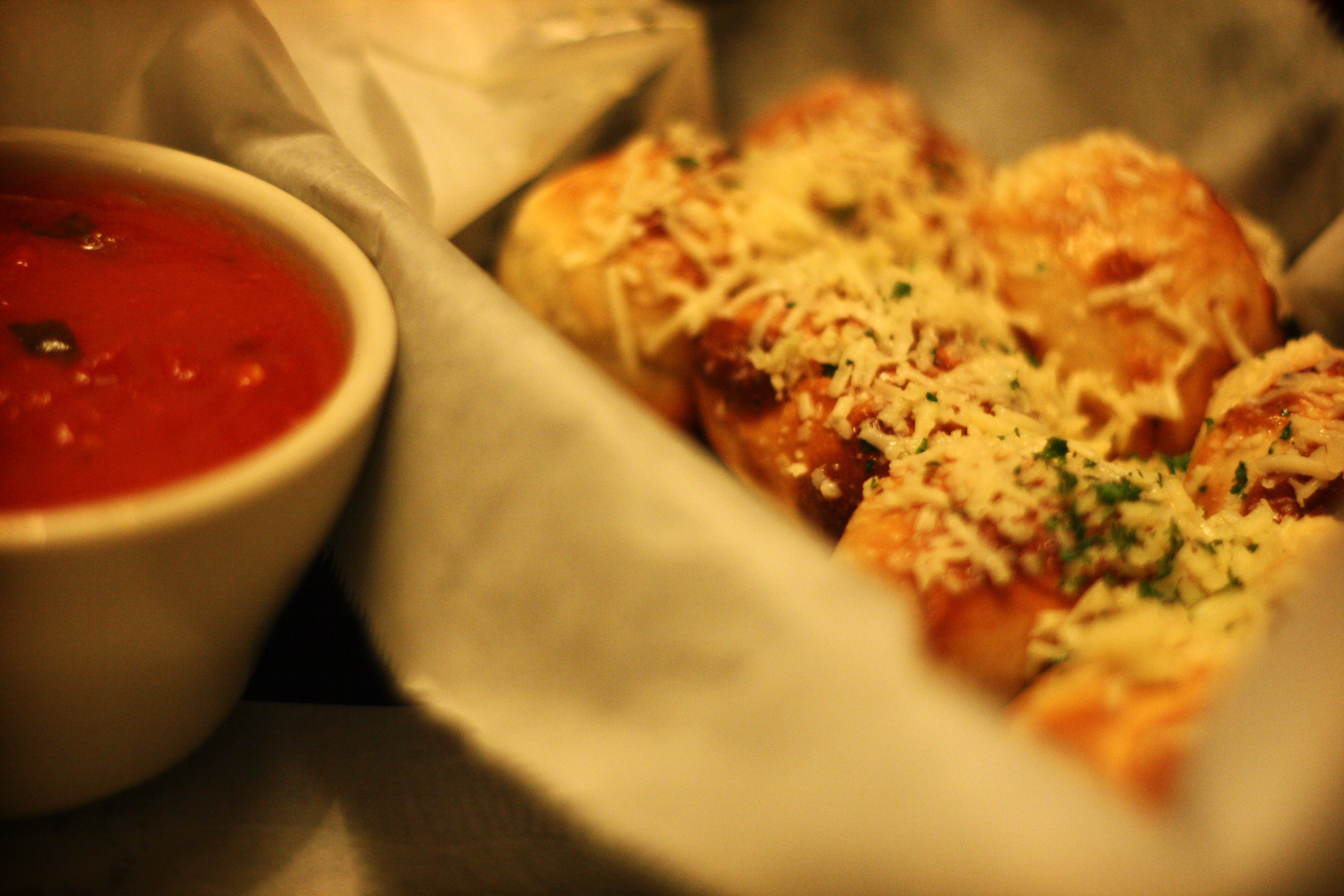
Garlic knots from The Union Grill

The ambiance boasts a "frills-free Italian vibe." It seats 150.

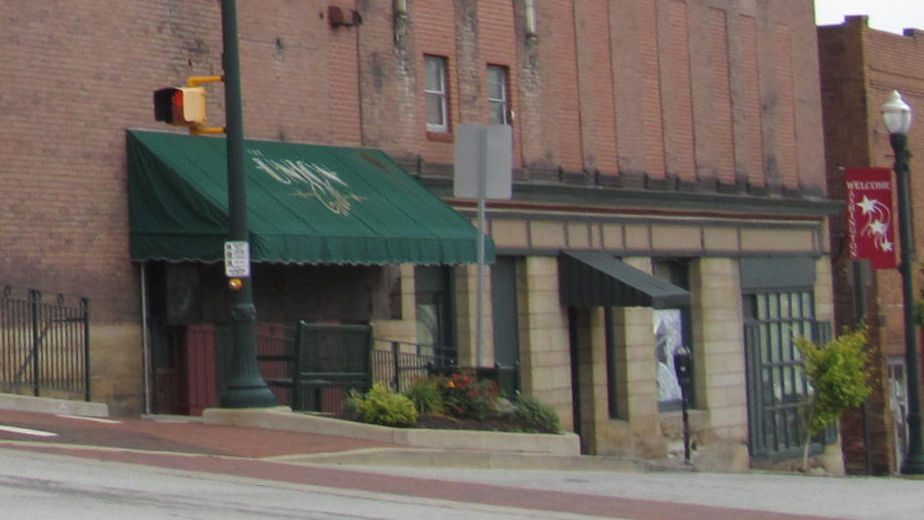
A view of the entrance, the source of the restaurant's nickname the Down and Under

The Union Grill is located in the bottom floor of the building, and because of its location at the top of a hill, part of the floor is below ground. The main entrance leads down a short flight of stairs from Wheeling Street. This rathskeller style entrance is the source of the restaurant's local nickname, "The Down and Under," or "D and U." The bar room is filled with wooden booths, brick walls, and antique furnishings. Other dining rooms split off from the main dining room, and feature Victorian oak furnishings.

== Importance in Washington ==
It is a local landmark in Washington, particularly attracting the legal crowd from the nearby courthouse that it is "almost a clubhouse for lawyers, judges and journalists." It has been described as Washington's "Place To Be Seen." The "back room" serves as a "gathering point for local bigwigs." For example, During the 1992 Presidential primary election in Pennsylvania, then-longshot Bill Clinton visited The Union Grill.

With its proximity to David Bradford House and Washington & Jefferson College, the Pittsburgh Post-Gazette said that "[l]unch or dinner at the historic Union Grill would be an appropriate way to start or end an interesting day in Washington, Pa."

== History ==
The Union's Grill's location in Washington was the home of the White Goose inn and tavern, dating to 1791. In 1806, it was sold to John Rettig who renamed it the "Golden Swan," also called "the Sign of the Swan." On August 15, 1808, printers William Sample and William B. Brown opened The Reporter (now Observer–Reporter) newspaper in the basement. The first edition featured an advertisement for the Golden Swan.

The original building was demolished in 1846 and replaced with a 3-story brick building called the Valentine House, which was itself destroyed by a grease fire in 1899. The Siegel brothers rebuilt the building and renamed it the Siegel Hotel; it was renamed the William Henry Hotel.

The current iteration, The Union Grill, was opened in 1967 by Michael Flynn, whose family still owns the restaurant. It was named in honor of the stonemasons and union workers who frequented the tavern.

In 2003, Michael "Mickey" Flynn Jr., his business partner, and 8 others were charged by Pennsylvania Attorney General Mike Fisher with running an illegal gambling ring out of the restaurant. Flynn was convicted and was granted bond in 2006.
