= Parmi =

Parmi may refer to:

- Parmigiana, an Italian dish made with fried eggplant or meat, layered with cheese and tomato sauce
- Chicken parmigiana, a variation of the above, popular in Australia and the United States
- Parmi, Australian slang for Chicken parmigiana (also spelled \"parmy\")
- Pāramī, or paramita, a concept in Buddhism; \"parmi\" is an informal Romanisation sometimes used in English sources
- The Parmi dialect, a variety of the Hindko language spoken in the Neelam Valley of Pakistan-administered Kashmir
