= Parmigiano (disambiguation) =

Parmigiano-Reggiano, or parmesan cheese, is a type of Italian cheese.

Parmigiano may also refer to:

People

- Parmigianino, also called Parmigiano (1503 – 1540), Italian Mannerist painter and printmaker
- Fabrizio Parmigiano (1555 – 1629), Italian Baroque painter

Other

- From the Province of Parma
- Parmigiano dialect of the Emilian language

== See also ==
- Parma (disambiguation)
- Parmesan (disambiguation)
- Parmigiana
- Parmo
