= Gino's Restaurant and Bar =

Restaurant in Portland, Oregon, U.S.

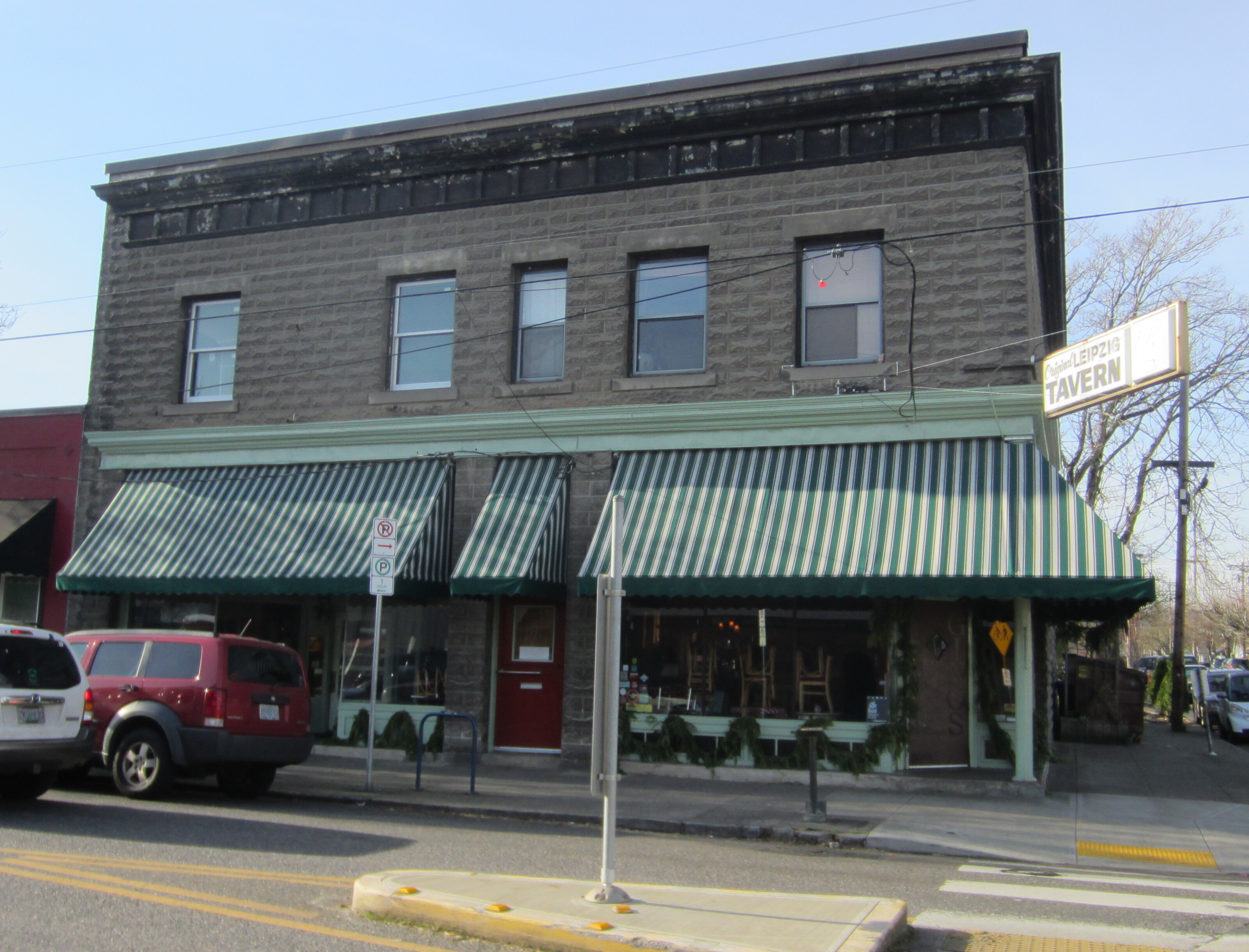
- The building's exterior in 2015
- Interactive map of Gino's Restaurant and Bar

Restaurant information
- Established: 1996
- Food type: Italian; Italian-American
- Location: 8051 Southeast 13th Avenue, Portland, Multnomah, Oregon, 97202, United States
- Coordinates: 45.4648°N 122.6531°W
- Website: ginossellwood.com

Gino's Restaurant and Bar is an Italian / Italian-American bar and restaurant in Portland, Oregon, United States. Established in 1996, it operates in southeast Portland's Sellwood-Moreland neighborhood.

== Description ==
The Italian / Italian-American restaurant Gino's operates in a century-old building previously home to Leipzig Tavern at the intersection of 13th and Spokane in southeast Portland's Sellwood-Moreland neighborhood. The interior has red-checkered tablecloths. The menu includes pastas, sandwiches and soups, salads, and steamed clams and mussels. The restaurant has served cioppino, chicken marsala, ravioli and rigatoni, and a Caesar salad. The burrata is served with baguette, cured meat, and zucchini pickles. The grass-fed beef steaks are from Painted Hills Ranch. The ragu stew has beef, pepperoni, pork ribs, and tomatoes.

== History ==
Spouses Marc and Deb Accuardi opened Gino's in 1996. Wesley Berger has been the chef. Lady Gaga ate at the restaurant in 2017.

== Reception ==
In 2014, Matthew Singer of Willamette Week said Gino's "remains one of surprisingly few places in Portland doing traditional American-style Italian without pretension". The Portland Mercury's MJ Skegg said the restaurant served "the best Caesar in town" in 2015. The newspaper's Andrea Damewood called Gino's "lovely and longstanding" in 2025. In The Oregonian's 2017 list of Portland's 10 best Italian restaurants, Michael Russell called Gino's "one of Portland's best-kept old-school Italian secrets, though not for its garlic shrimp, spaghetti vongole or dry-aged steaks so much as its wine list, a leather-bound book with a quasi-completist approach to Barolo".

In 2022, Brooke Jackson-Glidden included Gino's in Eater Portland's overview of the best burrata in the Portland metropolitan area. She described the business as a "Sellwood institution". The website's Alex Frane and Janey Wong included Gino's in a 2023 list of recommended eateries in the neighborhood, calling the business "a longstanding member of Sellwood's dining scene" with "one of the most robust lists of Italian wines in the city". Gino's was also included in Eater Portland's 2025 overview of the city's best Italian restaurants. The website said, "Gino's is some Old Portland realness. This Sellwood restaurant, almost always packed with locals, delivers heaping piles of pasta and other red sauce standards to tables in its dining room and wood-lined bar... And outside the world of pasta, seafood-packed cioppino is a favorite among the restaurant's decades-loyal regulars." Mona Bassil included Gino's in Tasting Table's 2026 list of the nation's sixteen best family-owned Italian restaurants.

== See also ==
- List of Italian restaurants
