= Chicken parmesan =

Italian-American dish

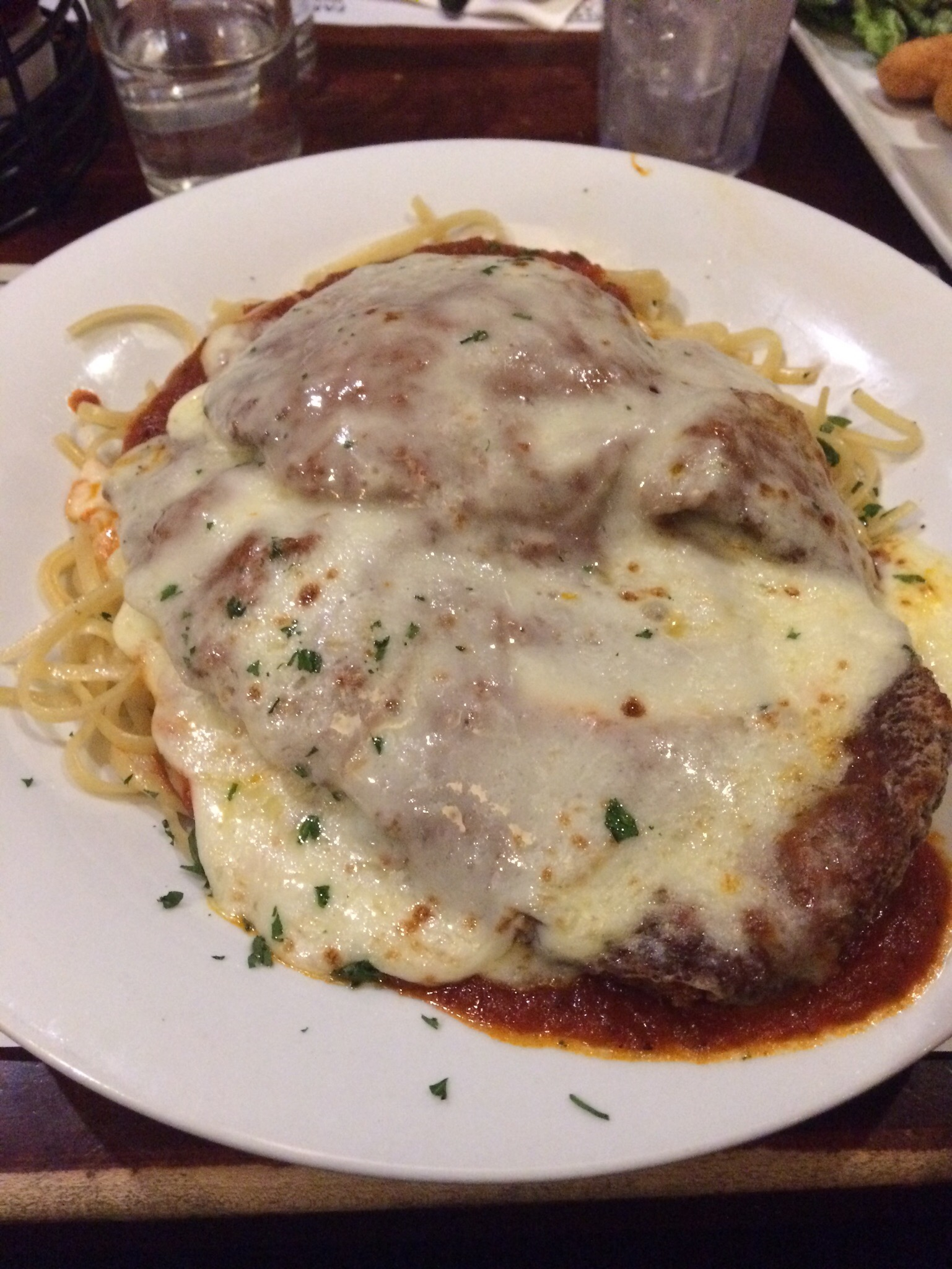
- Chicken parmesan from an American restaurant
- Alternative names: Chicken parmigiana
- Place of origin: United States
- Main ingredients: Chicken breast, tomato sauce, mozzarella, Parmesan

Chicken parmesan or chicken parmigiana (Italian: pollo alla parmigiana) is a dish that consists of fried breaded chicken breast covered in tomato sauce and mozzarella, Parmesan or provolone. Ham or bacon is sometimes added.

The dish originated in the Italian diaspora in the United States during the early 20th century. It has been speculated that the dish is based on a combination of parmigiana, an Italian dish using fried eggplant slices and tomato sauce, with a cotoletta, a breaded veal cutlet generally served without sauce or cheese in Italy.

Chicken parmesan is included as the base of a number of different meals, including sandwiches and pies.

== History ==
=== North America ===
Upon arriving in North America, Italian immigrants began to take advantage of the meat market, incorporating chicken into parmigiana. The dish, also known as "chicken parm", originated in the northeast United States from Italian immigrants, and became a popular staple in restaurants serving Italian-American cuisine by the 1950s. Home versions also grew in popularity. A recipe was published in the 1953 issue of the New York Herald Tribune that used frozen fried chicken patties or fillets along with other processed foods to make a version of the dish at home. A recipe for chicken parmesan was published in The New York Times in 1962.

In the United States and Canada, chicken parmesan is often served as a main course, and sometimes with a side of, or on top of, pasta. Many restaurants also offer chicken parm sandwiches.

=== Australia ===
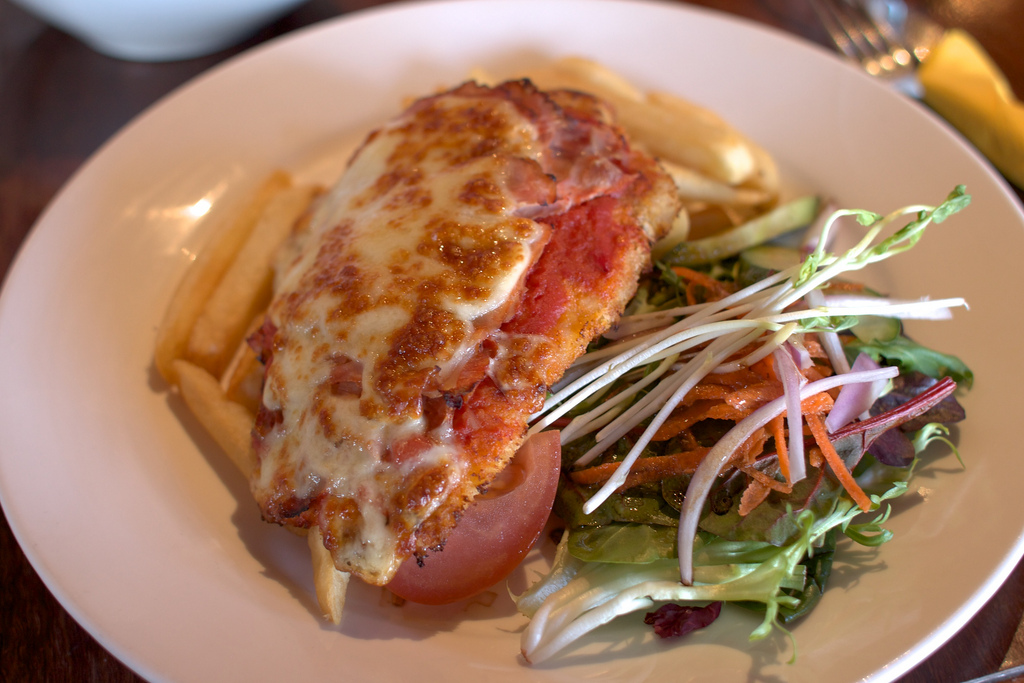
Chicken parmigiana with chips and salad, a common serving in Australia

Chicken parmigiana was known in Australia by the 1950s, and is often called parma, parmi or parmy in modern Australian parlance; its shorthand name varies from region to region. It was offered in restaurants in Adelaide as early as 1953. It is regularly served as a main meal throughout Australia, where it is considered a staple of pub food. In a 2019 interview that was broadcast on ABC Radio Hobart, food historian Jan O'Connell asserts that chicken parmigiana did not become a pub staple until the 1980s; before that time, it was primarily served in restaurants.

Chicken parmigiana is typically served in Australia with a side of chips and salad, although there is some dispute as to whether the chips should be served under or next to the chicken. Its popularity has led to a specialized chicken parmigiana restaurant opening in Melbourne, and chicken parmigiana is the subject of reviews on dedicated websites which compare the dish as purchased from various pubs within a region.

=== Asian fusion cooking ===
In fusion cuisine, chicken parmesan has been modified to suit Asian taste preferences by the addition of a small amount of soy sauce (as a salt substitute) to the tomato-based sauce and sometimes served with a side of rice or stir-fried noodles. This dish is sometimes marketed in English-speaking areas as chicken katsu parmesan. Sometimes, the soy sauce is added instead to the egg wash for the chicken.

== Similar dishes ==
=== Italy ===
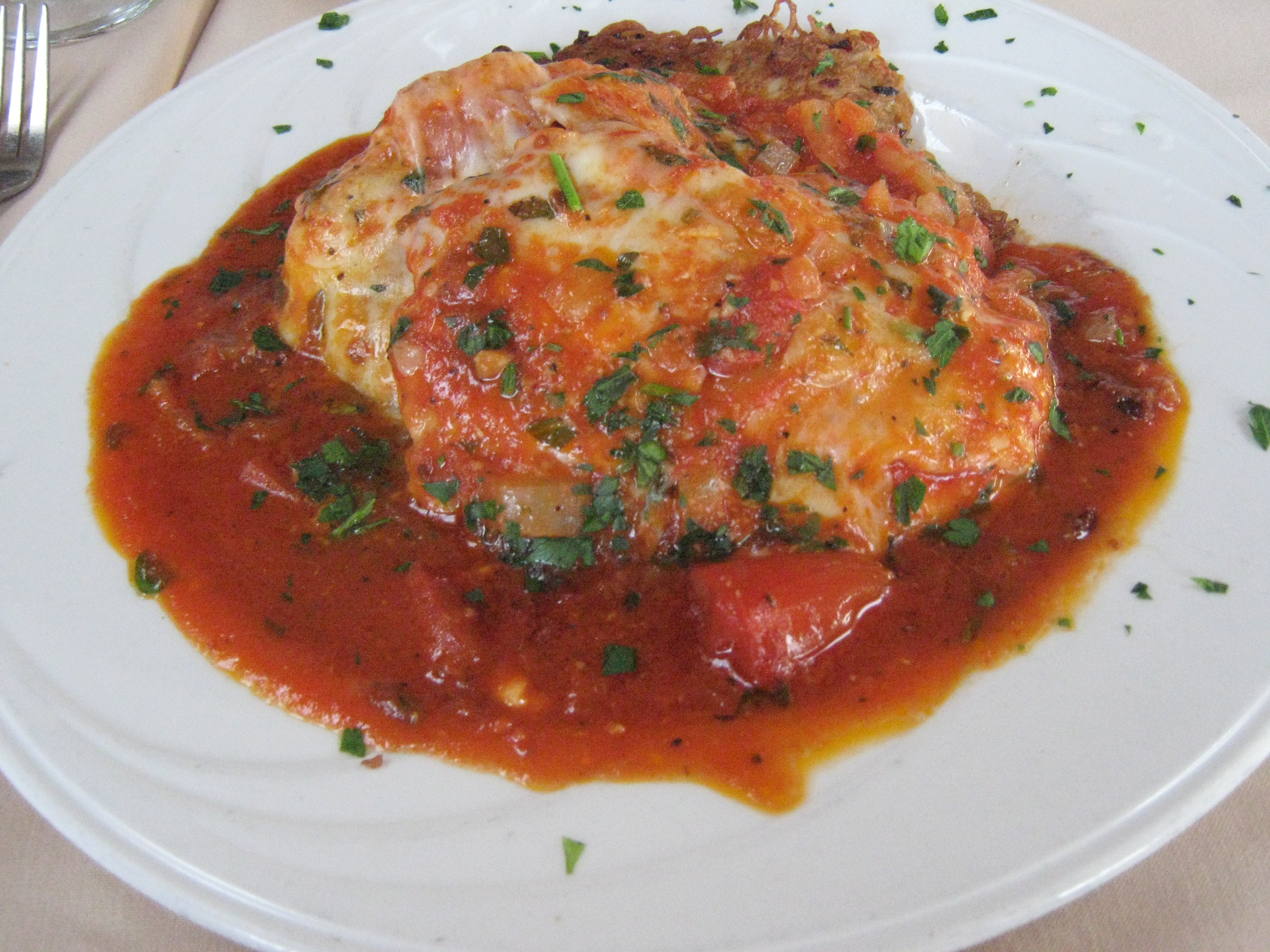
Pizzaiola in Venice, Italy

Aside from parmigiana, a dish using breaded eggplant slices instead of chicken, there are other similar dishes in Italy that use meat.

Pizzaiola is a dish derived from the Neapolitan tradition that features meat topped with cheese and often cooked with tomatoes, olive oil, garlic, and white wine. Beef is used most often but it can be made with chicken and pork as well.

A similar dish using veal is known in Italian as cotoletta alla bolognese, which excludes tomato sauce but includes melted Parmesan cheese and prosciutto. Costolette alla parmigiana is another similar veal dish, but in Italy it is generally served without sauce or cheese.

=== United Kingdom ===
In England, parmo is a dish originating in Middlesbrough that typically consists of fried breaded chicken or pork topped with a white béchamel sauce and cheese instead of tomato sauce. Parmo may have been created based on parmigiana.

=== Hungary ===
In Hungary, a chicken or pork cutlet breaded with a mix of flour and shredded potatoes, and topped with garlic, sour cream, and cheese is called mátrai borzaska (lit. 'scruffy from Mátra') or borzas for short.

=== Argentina ===
In Argentina, a variation of milanesa a la napolitana is made with chicken instead of the usual beef, similar to chicken parmigiana. It is sometimes topped with ham, bacon or a fried egg and is usually served with french fries.

== See also ==
Media related to Chicken parmesan at Wikimedia Commons

- List of chicken dishes
