= Garlic knot =

Italian-American type of garlic bread

Garlic knots
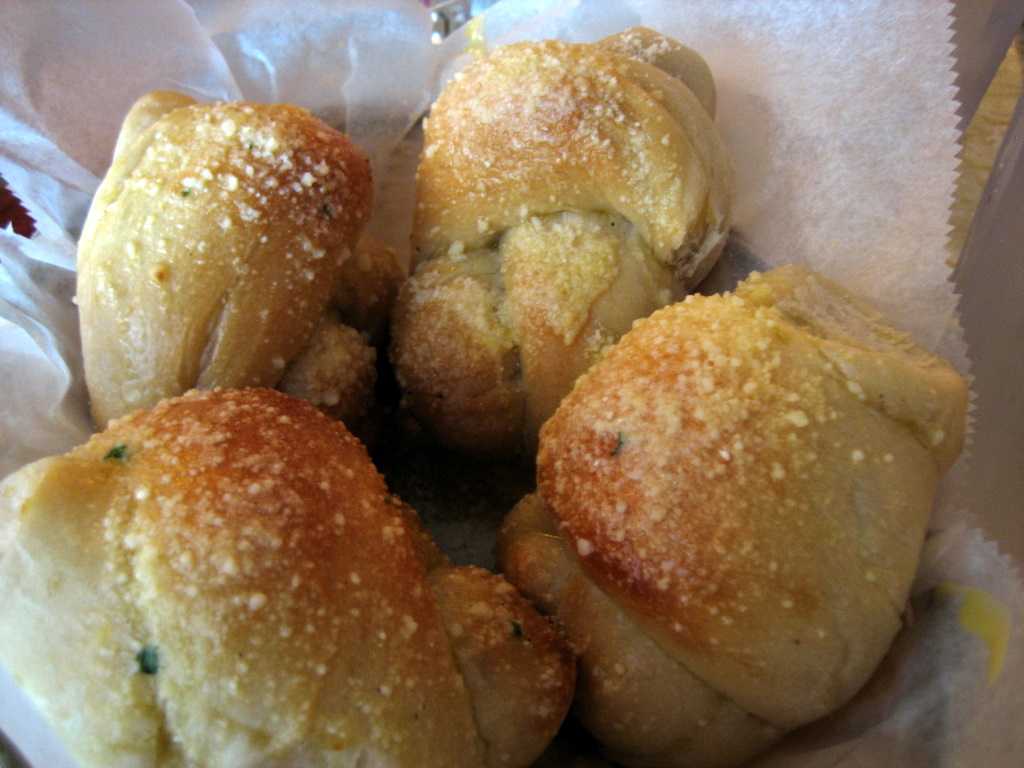
- Type: Garlic bread
- Place of origin: United States
- Region or state: Brooklyn, New York
- Main ingredients: Pizza dough, garlic, parmesan cheese

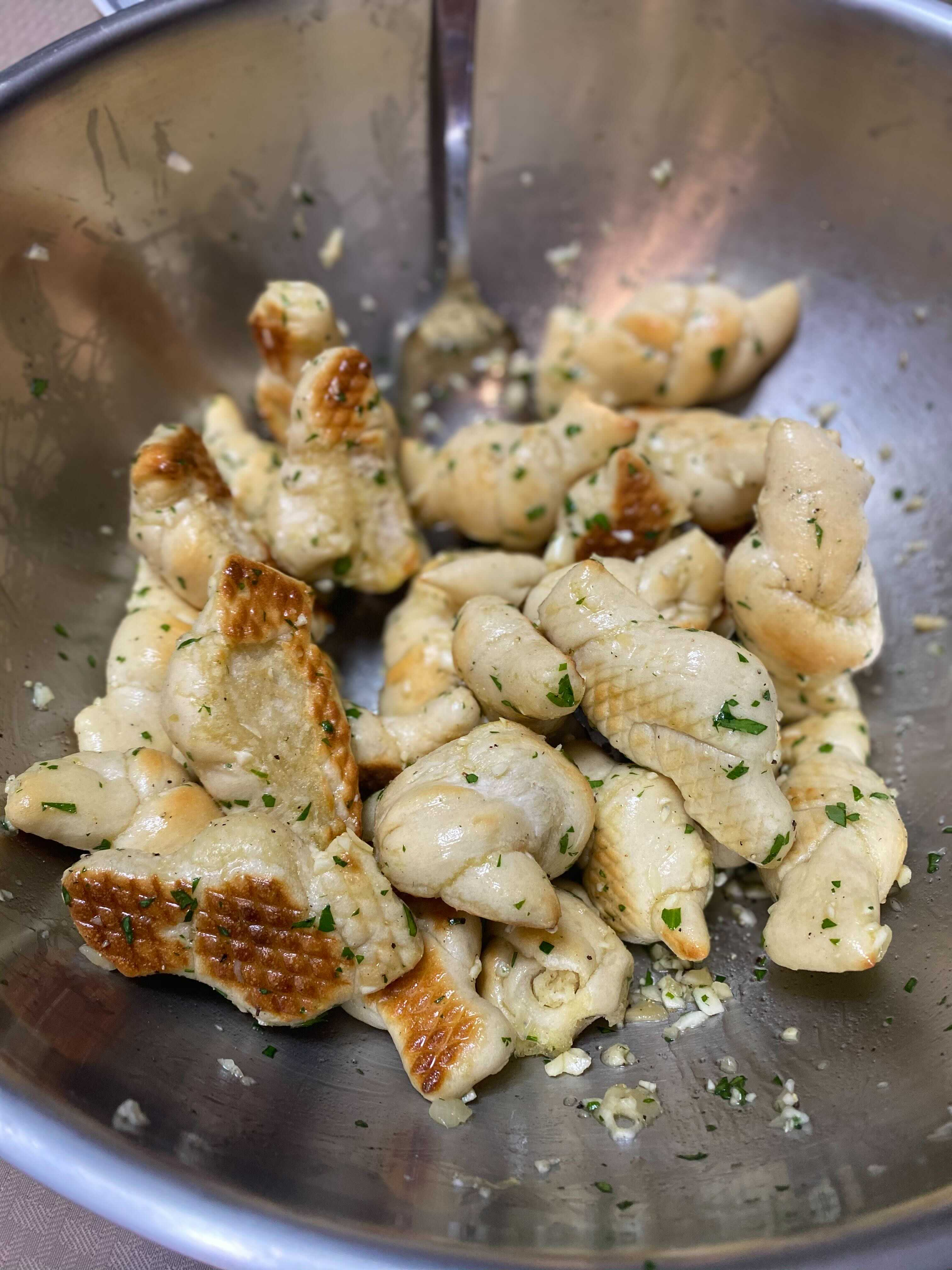
Garlic knots in tossing bowl

Garlic knots are a type of garlic bread found primarily in pizzerias around New York City and the surrounding regions. They were developed in the 1940s in Brooklyn. Many pizzerias claim to be the progenitors of the baked good.

As they are a way to make use of scraps, garlic knots are typically the cheapest menu item available at a pizzeria, and are often offered as a complimentary side dish with larger orders or meal combos.

== Preparation ==
Garlic knots are typically made from pizza dough. The dough is rolled and then pulled into small, tight overhand knots, and pre-baked in a pizza oven (temperatures of 700 °F or higher). The knots are then dipped in or generously brushed with a mix of oil, Parmesan cheese, and crushed garlic; variations can include finely chopped parsley, dried oregano, or black pepper. Before serving, garlic knots are baked a second time, and may be accompanied by marinara sauce.

== See also ==
- List of hors d'oeuvre
