= Chicken Francese =

Italian-American dish

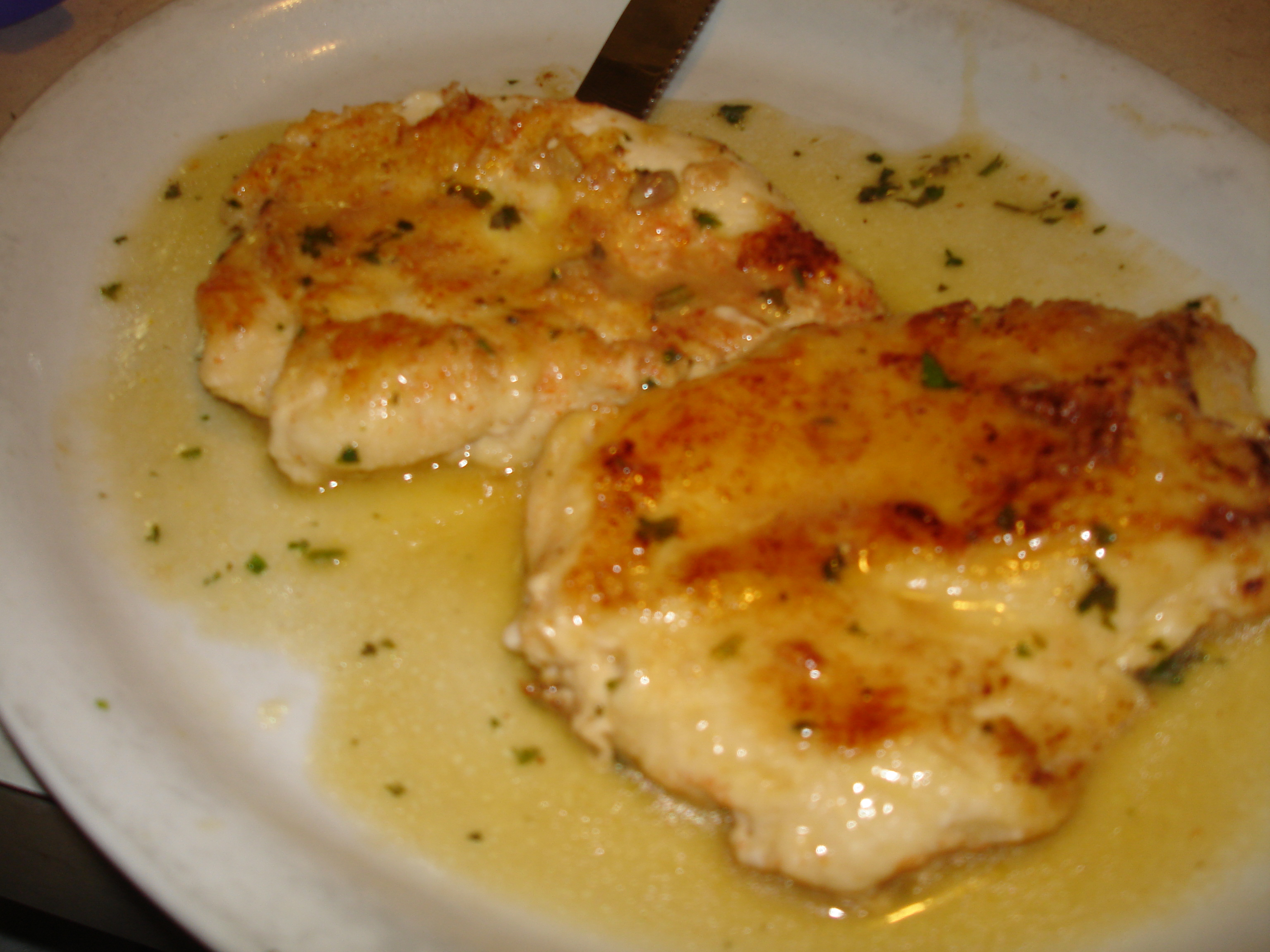
- Course: Main course
- Place of origin: US
- Region or state: New York State
- Associated cuisine: Italian-American cuisine
- Main ingredients: Chicken

Chicken Francese, Chicken Française, Chicken Francois or Chicken French is an Italian-American dish of flour-dredged, egg-dipped, sautéed chicken cutlets with a lemon-butter and sherry or white wine sauce. The dish is popular in the region surrounding Rochester, New York, where it is known as Chicken French, to the point that some have suggested the dish be called Chicken Rochester.

== Origin ==
Despite being such a well-known dish in Italian-American culture, francese is not a classical dish or sauce. There are no written recipes that mark the origin of this dish. Veal piccata seems to be the closest match among Italian dishes.

John Mitzewich claims that the dish originated with first-generation Italian immigrants. Their recipe for veal francese (vitello francese) was altered by substituting chicken for the more expensive veal.

Democrat and Chronicle, a Rochester newspaper, instead claims that the dish is a recent invention. The paper claims that a vitello francese appeared in New York City after World War II. Chefs Tony Mammano and Joe Cairo brought the dish to the Rochester region in the 1950s under the name "Veal French", after which the dish became popular. When consumers boycotted veal in the 1970s, area chefs like James Cianciola of the Brown Derby Restaurant successfully substituted chicken. Cianciola later published a cookbook on these "French" dishes.

== Variations ==
Artichokes French is a common variation using artichoke hearts instead of chicken. Artichokes French is often served as an appetizer.

== See also ==
- List of chicken dishes
- Italian-American cuisine
