= Mazzocco =

Mazzocco is an Italian surname. Notable people with the surname include:

- Davide Mazzocco (born 1995), Italian footballer
- Jen Mazzocco (born 1984), American politician
- Martín Stefanonni Mazzocco (born 1964), Mexican lawyer and politician
- Stefano Mazzocco (born 1980), Italian footballer

== See also ==
- Mazzucco
