= Marinara sauce =

Tomato sauce with herbs

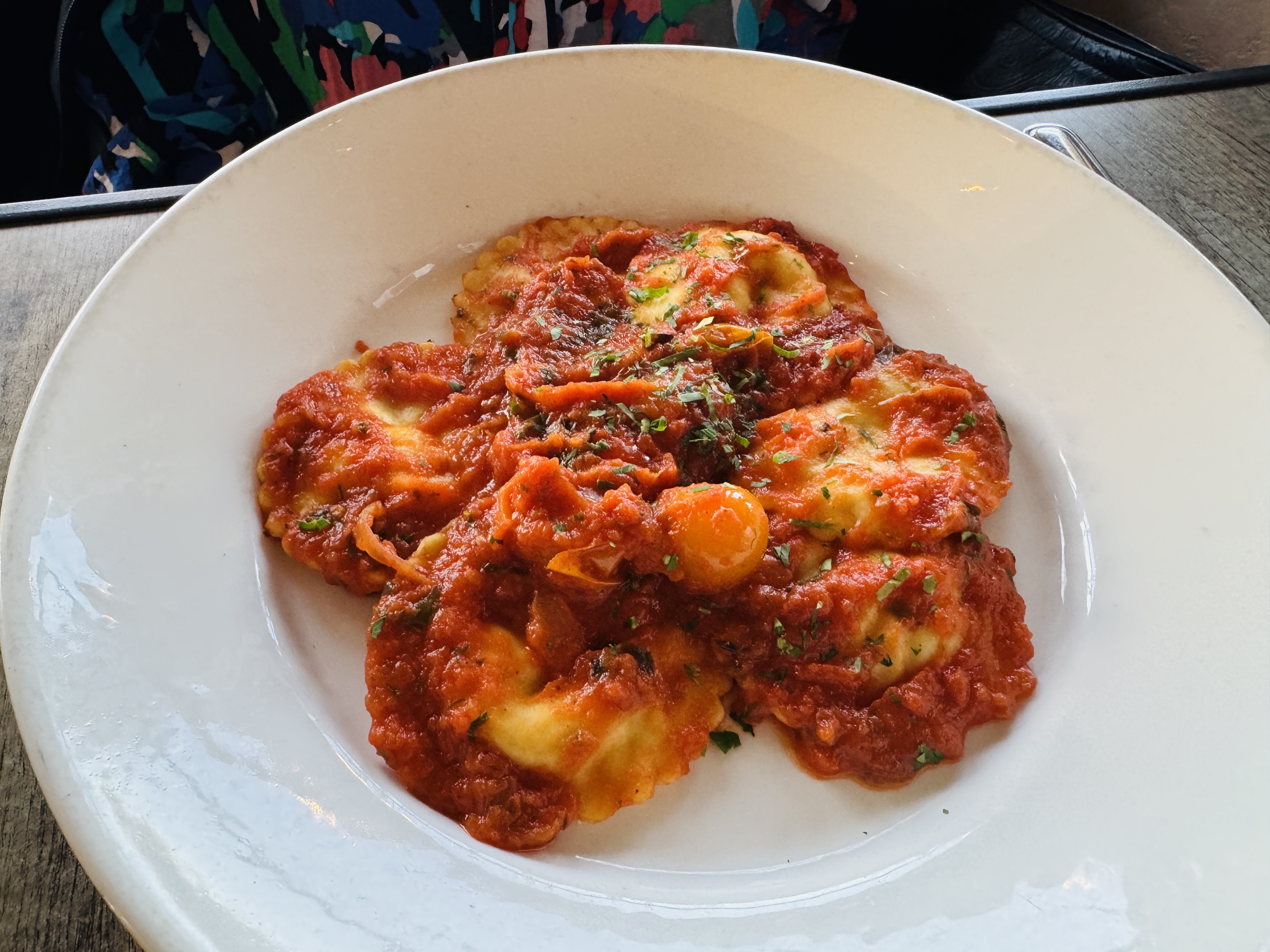
- A plate of ravioli alla marinara
- Type: Sauce
- Main ingredients: Tomatoes, garlic, onions, basil, oregano
- Variations: Olives, capers

Marinara sauce is a tomato sauce usually made with tomatoes, garlic, herbs, and onions. Variations include capers, olives, spices, and a dash of wine. Widely used in Italian-American cuisine, it is known as alla marinara ('sailor's style') in its native Italy, where it is typically made with tomatoes, basil, olive oil, garlic, and oregano, but also sometimes with olives, capers, and salted anchovies. It is used for spaghetti and vermicelli, but also with meat or fish.

The terms should not be confused with spaghetti marinara, a popular dish in Australia, New Zealand, Spain, and South Africa, in which a tomato-based sauce is mixed with fresh seafood. In Italy, a pasta sauce including seafood is more commonly called alla pescatora.

== Origin ==
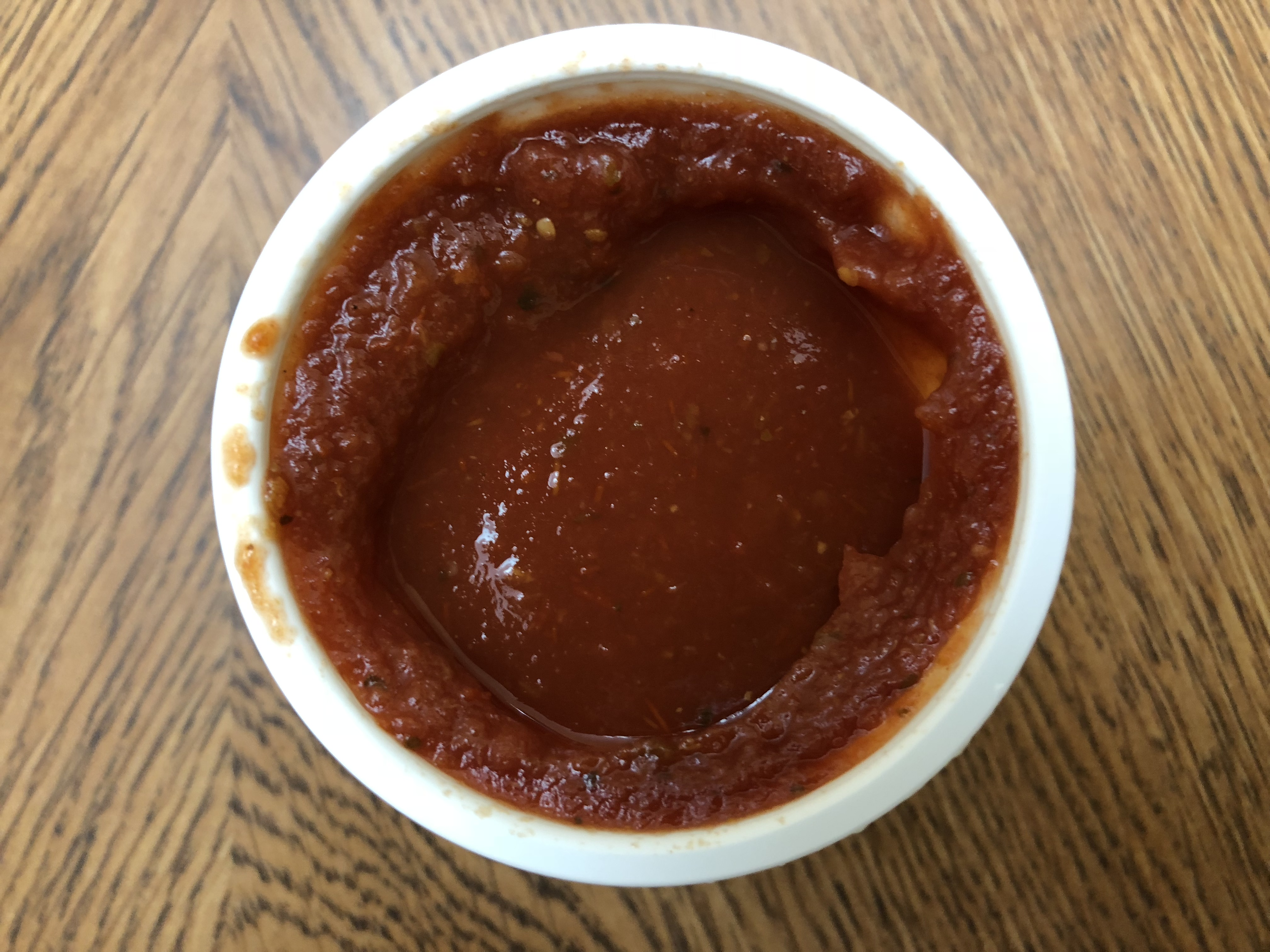
A cup of Domino's marinara sauce

Several folk theories exist as to the origin of this sauce. One version states that cooks aboard Neapolitan ships returning from the Americas invented marinara sauce in the mid-16th century after Spaniards introduced the tomato to Europe. Another theory states this was a sauce prepared by the wives of Neapolitan sailors upon their return from the sea.

Historically, however, the first Italian cookbook to include tomato sauce, Lo Scalco alla Moderna (The Modern Steward), was written by Italian chef Antonio Latini and was published in two volumes in 1692 and 1694. Latini served as the Steward of the First Minister to the Spanish Viceroy of Naples. This early tomato sauce was more like a modern tomato salsa.

A sauce similar to Italian-American marinara sauce is known in some areas of central Italy as sugo finto (lit. 'fake sauce').

== See also ==
- Media related to Marinara sauce at Wikimedia Commons
- Marinara Sauce at the Wikibooks Cookbook subproject
- List of sauces

== Bibliography ==
- Zanini De Vita, Oretta; Fant, Maureen B. (2013). Sauces & Shapes: Pasta the Italian Way. New York: W. W. Norton & Company. ISBN 978-0-393-08243-2.
