= Parma, Russia =

Parma (Russian: Парма) is the name of several inhabited localities in Russia.

Urban localities

- Parma, Usinsk, Komi Republic, an urban-type settlement under the administrative jurisdiction of the town of republic significance of Usinsk in the Komi Republic; 65°57′N 57°27′E

Rural localities

- Parma, Ust-Kulomsky District, Komi Republic, a village in Ust-Kulom selo Administrative Territory of Ust-Kulomsky District in the Komi Republic; 61°46′N 54°1′E
- Parma, Perm Krai, a settlement at the station under the administrative jurisdiction of the town of krai significance of Gubakha in Perm Krai
