= Pizzaiola =

Italian meat dish

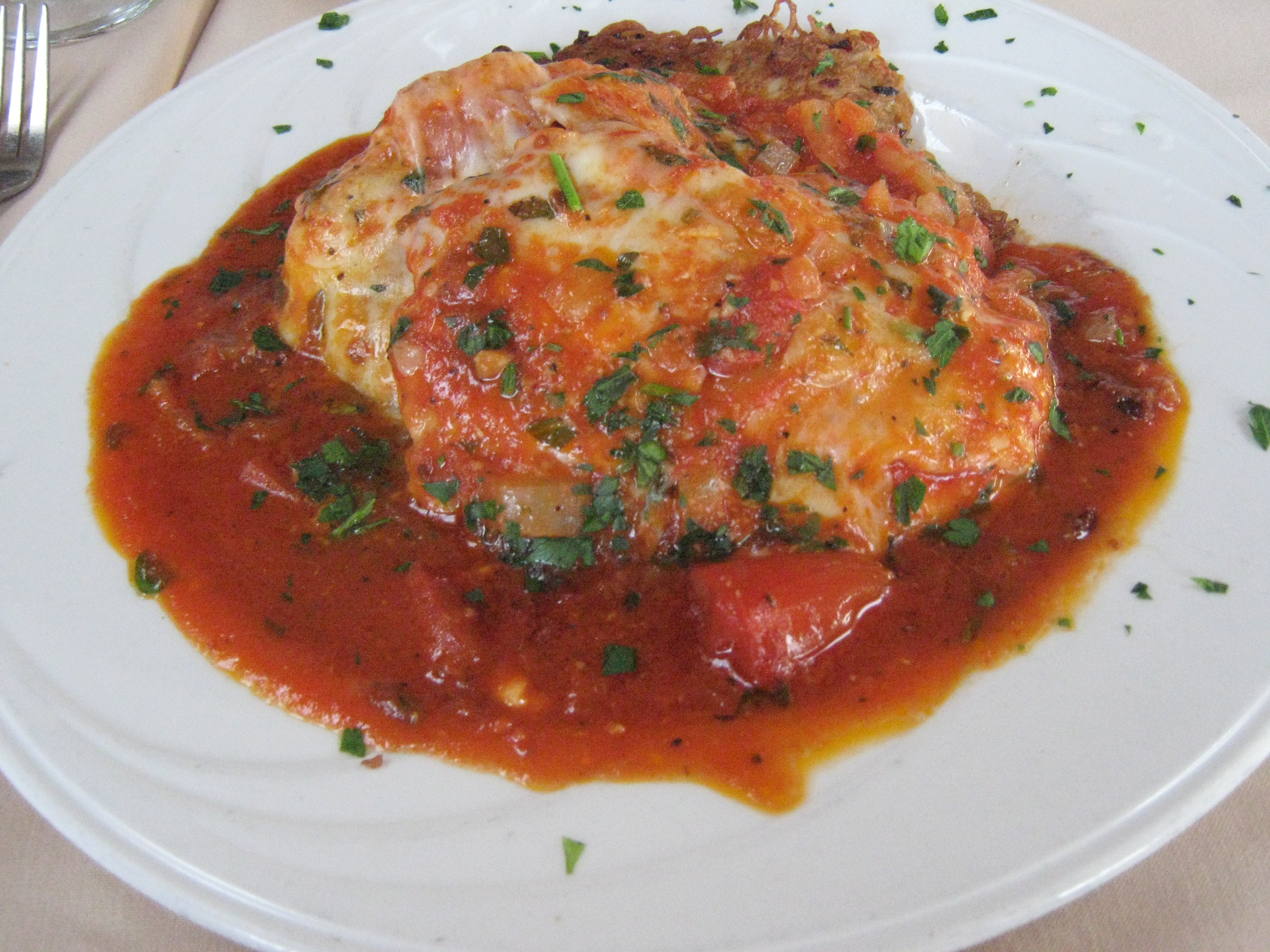
- Pizzaiola in Venice, Italy
- Course: Main course (Secondo)
- Place of origin: Italy
- Region or state: Naples and Sicily
- Associated cuisine: Neapolitan cuisine
- Main ingredients: Beef or veal, tomatoes, olive oil, garlic, oregano

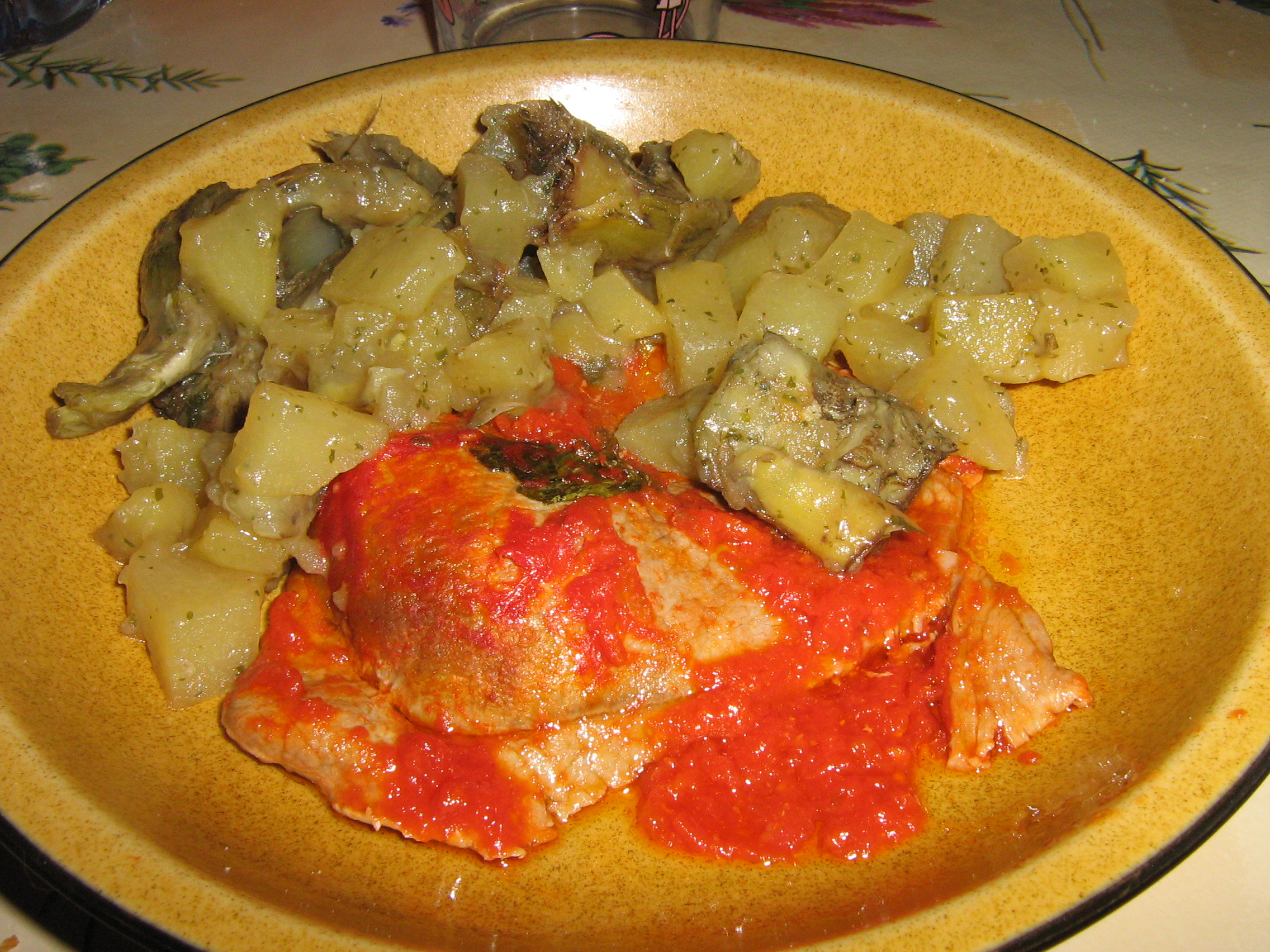
Pizzaiola with potatoes and artichokes

Pizzaiola, also known as carne alla pizzaiola, is a dish derived from the Neapolitan and Apulian traditions that features meat (often less expensive cuts of beef) cooked with tomatoes, olive oil, garlic, and white wine long enough to tenderize the meat. Most versions also include tomato paste, oregano, and basil.

Pizzaiola is often associated with cucina povera where inexpensive cuts of meat are tenderized by stewing them in acidic sauces such as tomato sauce. The sauce can also be used for pasta.

== History ==
The history of the pizzaiola is somewhat uncertain, even if the origin is almost certainly Neapolitan.

== See also ==
- Marinara sauce
- Neapolitan cuisine
- Chicken marsala
- Scaloppine
- Cacciatore
- Braciola
