= Garlic bread =

Bread topped with garlic and olive oil or butter

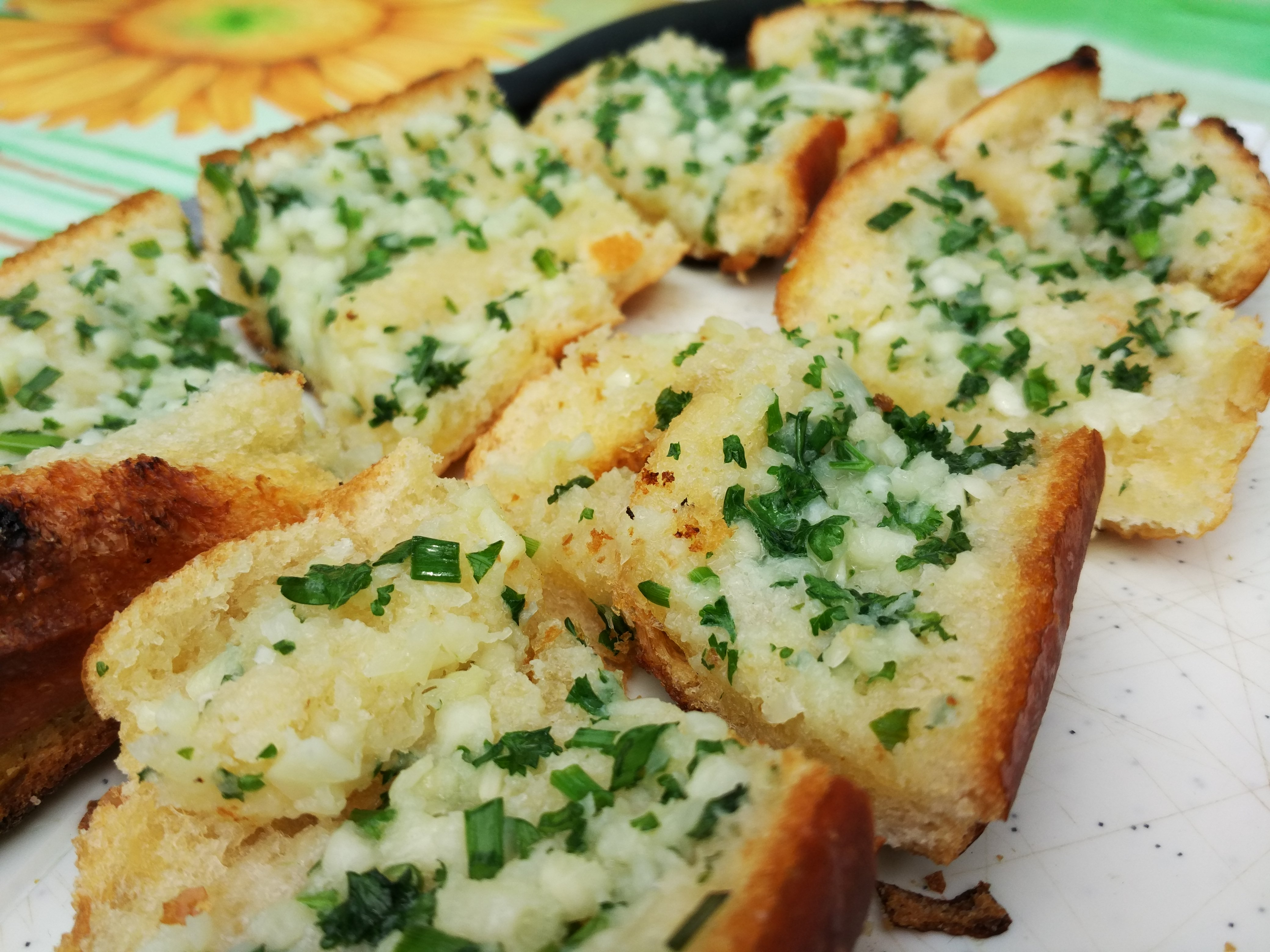
- A common variation of garlic bread
- Type: Bread
- Course: Entrée or side dish
- Place of origin: United States
- Main ingredients: Bread (typically baguette), garlic, herbs, olive oil or butter
- Variations: Cheesy garlic bread, garlic knots, garlic bread pizza, tomato bread

Garlic bread (also called garlic toast) is a dish consisting of crusty bread slices topped with garlic and butter, and additional herbs such as oregano, chives or parsley. Some versions include cheese. It is then either grilled until toasted or baked in a conventional or bread oven.

Garlic bread is typically made using a baguette, or sometimes ciabatta which is partially sliced downwards, allowing the condiments to soak into the loaf while keeping it in one piece. The bread is then stuffed through the cuts with oil and minced garlic before baking. Alternatively, butter and garlic powder are used, or the bread is cut lengthwise into separate slices which are individually garnished.

== History ==
Garlic bread stems from bruschetta, which appeared in Italy around the 15th century, and can be traced back to ancient Rome.

Contemporary garlic bread originated in the United States and it is a typical Italian-American dish. Garlic bread may have originated after Italian immigrants started to use butter as a substitute for olive oil, which was uncommon in the United States in the first half of the 20th century.

== Europe ==
In France, it was common in Provence, where it was called chapon and served with salad. It was also prepared in other regions, such as Quercy, as a crust of bread rubbed with garlic and spiced with a pinch of salt along with a drop of walnut oil.

In England, butter is used instead of olive oil in garlic bread.

Garlic baguettes sold in UK supermarkets are produced on an industrial scale by manufacturers such as Bakkavör, which operates major bread production facilities in Cheshire supplying national retailers.

In Lithuania, kepta duona is a fried bread dish involving black rye bread that has been rubbed with garlic. It is often eaten as a bar snack.

== North America ==
In the United States, garlic bread has been on the menu of many restaurants since at least the 1950s, often paired with pasta dishes. Commercially manufactured frozen garlic bread was developed in the 1970s by Cole's Quality Foods in Muskegon, Michigan. Garlic knots, a variant invented in the 1940s in Brooklyn, New York City, are commonly served at many pizzerias as appetizers.

Texas toast is a form of garlic bread developed in Texas in the 1940s and served as a side to southern-style dishes.

== See also ==
- List of bread dishes
- List of garlic dishes
- Garlic soup
