= Antonio Latini =

Italian steward, cardinal-nephew, and chef (1642–1692)

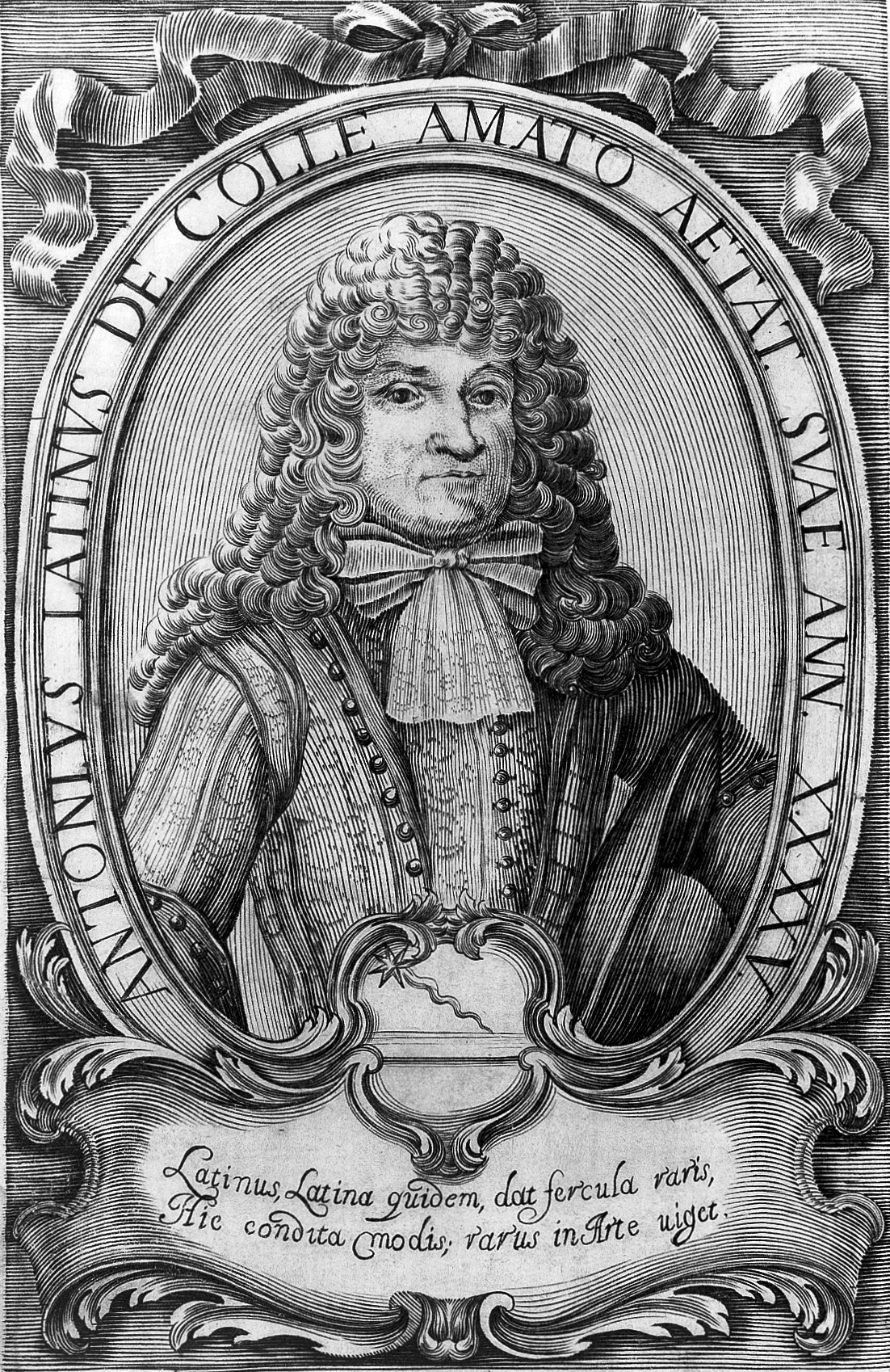
Portrait of Antonio Latini

Antonio Latini (1642–1692) was a steward of Cardinal Antonio Barberini, cardinal-nephew of Pope Urban VIII in Rome and subsequently to Don Stefano Carillo Salcedo, first minister to the Spanish viceroy of Naples. He is also credited to be the one that made the first "official" ice cream.

== Biography ==
Latini was born in Collamato, now a frazione of the town of Fabriano, in the province of Ancona, but at the time in the Papal States. His cookbook, Lo scalco alla moderna "the Modern Steward", (Naples, vol. I 1692, vol. II 1694), contains in its first volume the (surprisingly late) earliest surviving recipes for tomato sauce, though he did not suggest serving it over pasta. One of his tomato recipes is for sauce alla spagnuola, "in the Spanish style". In his second volume Latini gives early recipes for sorbetti.

Latini had gone to Rome at the age of sixteen, and worked his way up in the familia or household of Cardinal Barberini. By turns assistant cook, waiter and wardrobe attendant, he learned the theatrical carving skills expected of a maître d'hôtel and swordsmanship as well. Mastering the arts of successively important stewardship positions, he was made a Roman conte, a "Knight of the Golden Spur" for his service. After working in Rome and at courts in Macerata, Mirandola and Faenza, Latini went to serve as scalco, or household steward, to Carillo Salcedo in 1682.

In Naples, Latini cast his net widely for the best products of the Kingdom of Naples for Don Stefano's table. In Lo scalco alla moderna a brief description of the Regno listed fruits and local specialties in melons and game, oil and olives, vegetables and salads of "rare quality", drawn from Latini's professional experience from 25 locales, none of them as far afield as Sicily, in fact mostly within a days journey of Naples: Poggio Reale, Chiaja, Posillipo hills, Pozzuoli, Procida, Ischia, Capri, Sorrento, Vico, Castell'a mare di Stabbia, Torre del Greco, Granatiello, Monte di Somma, Orta, Nola, Aversa, Cardito, Arienzo, Acerra, Giugliano, Capua, Gaeta, Venafro, Sora, Isola di Sora.

Latini's manuscript autobiography, not included in Lo scalco alla moderna, brings his personal career to light by sharing details of a kitchen career that had hitherto been unheard of when they were first described in print by French gastronomist Marie-Antoine Carême. A transcription that was made in 1690 was discovered in the city library of Fabriano and published by Furio Liccichenti.
