= Mazzucco =

Mazzucco is an Italian surname. Notable people with the surname include:

- Alexandra Mazzucco (born 1993), German handball player
- Joe Mazzucco (1891–?), Italian racing driver
- Massimo Mazzucco (born 1954), Italian film director
- Melania Mazzucco (born 1966), Italian author
- Raphael Mazzucco, Canadian photographer
- Alberto Mazzucco (1911–1996), Italian ex-football player

== See also ==
- Mazzucco Sanctuary, a religious sanctuary in Piedmont, Italy
