= Francesco Leonardi (chef) =

Italian chef and food author

Francesco Leonardi was an Italian chef and food author, born in Rome, and active in the 18th century in several European countries.

He concluded his career as chef of Empress Catherine II of Russia. Back in Rome, he wrote the cookbook L'Apicio moderno, ("Modern Apicius") in six volumes, first edited in 1790. In the book's introduction, Leonardi sketches the first historic survey of the Italian cuisine, from the Roman age through the golden age of the Renaissance until the 18th century. He also shows a profound knowledge of international cuisines, including Russian, Polish, Turkish, German, English and French cuisines.

He subsequently began to draft a new work, the Dizionario ragionato degli alimenti, of which only three volumes have survived. It was published in Rome in 1795 by the editor Paolo Giunchi. Another of his works is Gianina, ossia la cuciniera delle Alpi, which was printed in Rome in 1817 and is dedicated to alpine cuisine.

The first Chef to regularly use tomatoes in his work, Leonardi is credited with the invention of the classic tomato sauce for pasta.

== Sources ==
- Faccioli, Emilio (1987). L'Arte della cucina in Italia (in Italian). Milano: Einaudi.
