= Trinchero =

Trinchero is a surname. Notable people with the surname include:

- Daniele Trinchero (born 1968), Italian engineer and inventor
- Luigi Trinchero (1862–1944), Italian sculptor active in Argentina
- Serge Trinchero (born 1949), Swiss/Italian footballer
