= Parma, Perm Krai =

Parma Парма
- Settlement
- Location within Perm Krai Location within Russia
- Coordinates: 58°50′N 57°11′E
- Country: Russia
- Region: Perm Krai
- District: Gubakhinsky Urban okrug
- Time zone: UTC+5:00

Parma (Russian: Парма) is a rural locality (a settlement) in Gubakhinsky Urban okrug, Perm Krai, Russia. The population was 310 as of 2010. There are 11 streets.
