= Chicken marsala =

Dish of chicken in a Marsala wine sauce

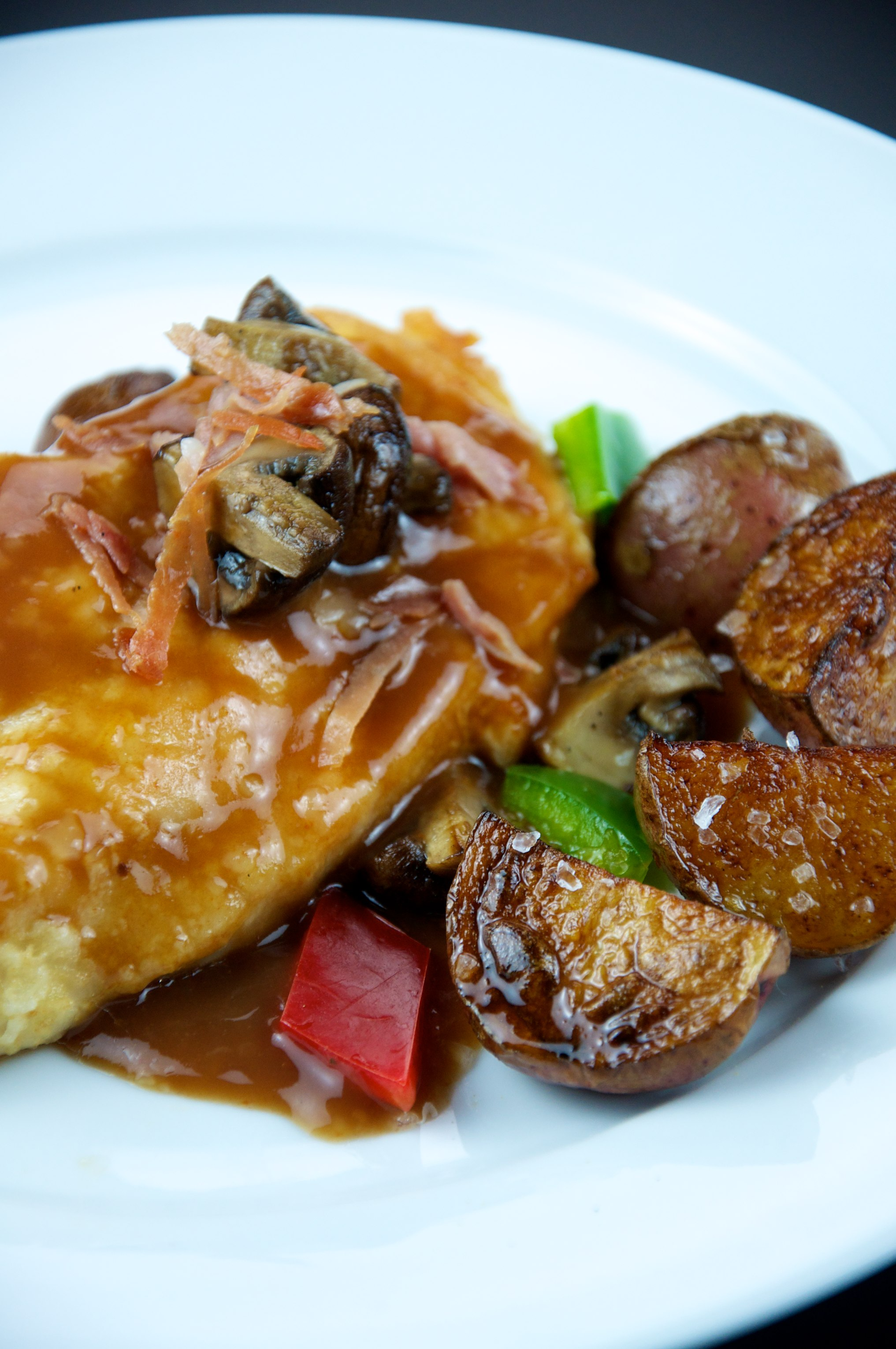
- Chicken marsala with mushrooms, red potatoes, red and green bell peppers, and pancetta
- Place of origin: Italy
- Region or state: Sicily

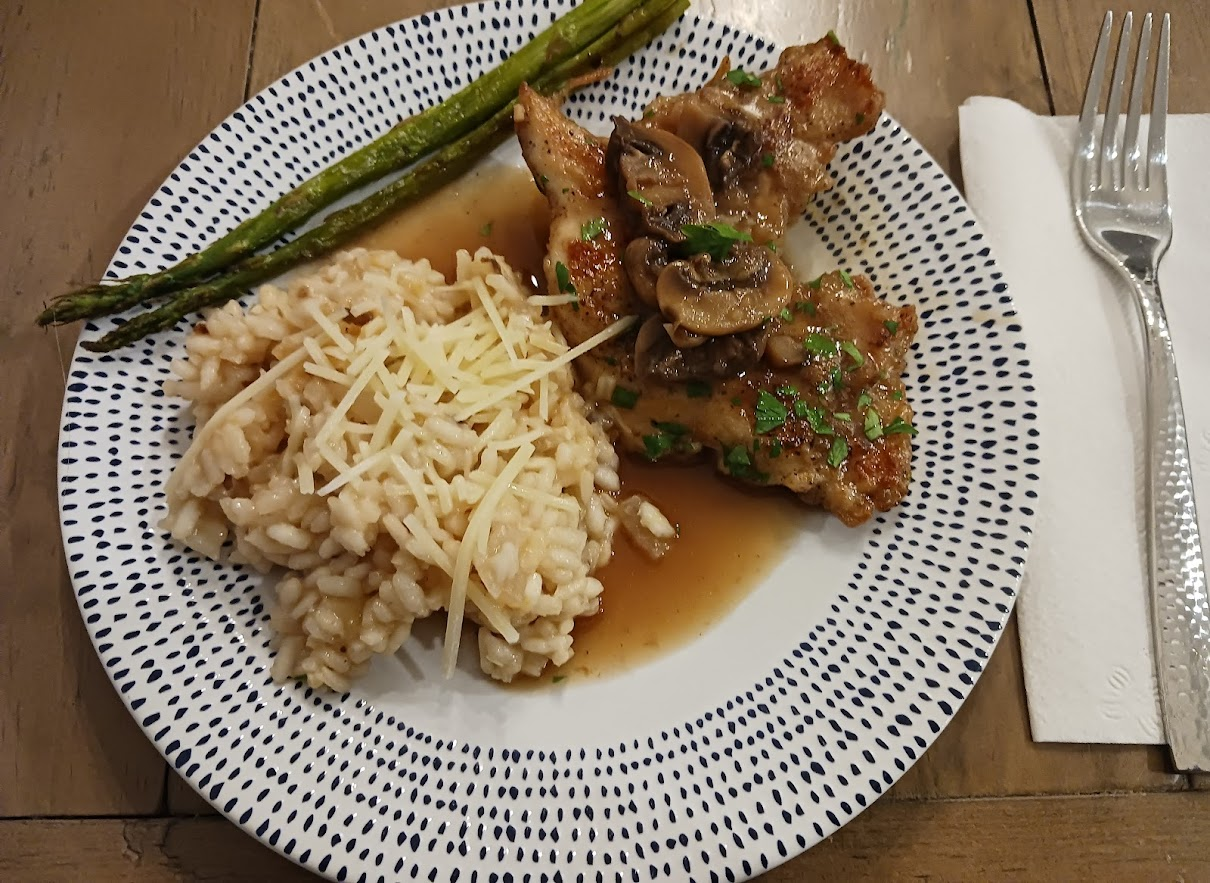
Chicken Marsala With Risotto & Asparagus

Chicken marsala (Italian: pollo al marsala or scaloppine al marsala) is a dish of chicken escalopes in a Marsala wine sauce. It is a variation of traditional Italian scaloppina dishes, of which there are many varieties throughout Italy. The dish dates to the 19th century, when it may have originated with English families who lived in western Sicily, where Marsala wine is produced.

Slices of chicken breast are coated in flour, briefly sautéed, and then removed from the pan, which is then used to make a Marsala reduction sauce. The sauce is made by reducing the wine to nearly the consistency of a syrup while adding garlic. The sauce is then poured over the chicken, which has been kept in a warming oven, and served immediately.

As an alternative method, the chicken breasts may be braised in a mixture of Marsala wine and butter.

== See also ==
- Carne pizzaiola
- Cooking with wine
