= Parmo =

English take-away dish

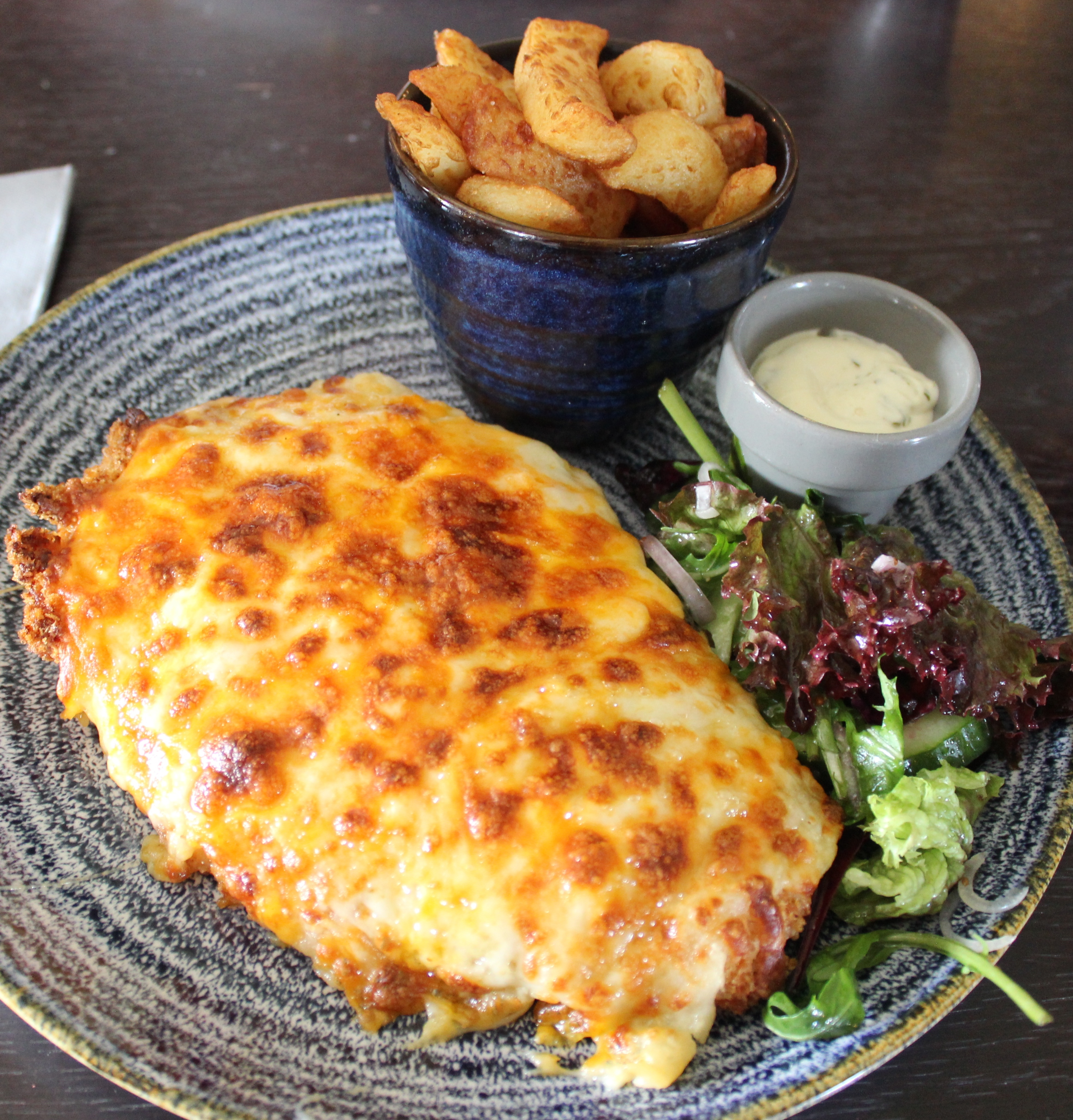
- Alternative names: Teesside Parmesan
- Place of origin: England
- Region or state: Teesside
- Created by: Nicos Harris
- Main ingredients: Chicken or pork cutlet, béchamel sauce, cheese

Parmo, or Teesside Parmesan, is a dish originating in Middlesbrough, England, and a popular item of take-away food in the Teesside area as well as Northern England. It consists of a breaded cutlet of chicken or pork topped with a white béchamel sauce and cheese, usually cheddar.

The name was originally Escalope Parmesan, made with tomato sauce and mozzarella, which is itself a derivation of the Italian melanzane alla parmigiana.

In an April 2019 survey, parmo ranked 20th in Britain's Top 20 Favourite Takeaways.

== History ==
=== Origins ===
The origins of the Teesside Parmo are disputed however most credit Nicos Harris, a Greek American navy chef. He was wounded off the coast of France, and brought to the United Kingdom to be treated at what is now James Cook University Hospital, Middlesbrough. He stayed in Middlesbrough and opened a restaurant, The American Grill, on Linthorpe Road, where he created the parmo in 1958, which was originally called an Escalope Parmesan. His son-in-law, Caramello, still lived in Teesside as of 2007, continuing the family tradition.

Other theories credit Marcellino Dinello, an Italian who moved to Teesside with his wife in the 1960s to open the famous Europa restaurant in Teesside.

=== Supermarket sales ===
In 2007–2008, Teesside business man Geoff Johns started the Jeff the Chef company to make and sell "cook-chill-reheat" parmos, which are baked and then blast-chilled, before being packaged up for sale through supermarkets and other commercial outlets.

Initially serving a few local shops, the product was quickly taken up by supermarket chain Asda, and by July 2009, Asda were selling 6,000 a week in the Teesside region. In a profile of Jeff the Chef in 2017, it was stated that the company employed 20 staff at the Skippers Lane Industrial Estate in Middlesbrough, and they were making 10,000 parmos a week, to supply around 100 stores in North East England, including Asda, Morrisons, Sainsbury's, the Co-op, and some independents.

=== Application for PDO/TSG status ===
During his successful 2017 election campaign for Tees Valley Mayor, Ben Houchen promised that he would work to get the parmo protected status. "It's a key part of our local culture and we should be proud of Teesside and the things we produce".

An application for official recognition of the parmo as a traditional speciality in the UK was submitted in July 2021. To qualify for the TSG (Traditional Speciality Guaranteed) label, a food must be of "specific character" to differentiate it clearly from similar products, and its raw materials, production method, or processing must be "traditional" (which is defined as "proven usage on the domestic market for a period that allows transmission between generations; this period is to be at least 30 years").

=== World Parmo Championships ===
A light-hearted celebration of the parmo, the World Parmo Championships started with an inaugural competition in 2007 in Stockton, with the first winner being Mike Featherstone. The championships ran annually until 2016, after which there was a two-year gap. The 2019 edition saw 30 restaurants compete before the live "parmo-off" between the final four at the Middlesbrough Town Hall. The winner was the Borge Italian restaurant from Stockton-on-Tees, taking their fourth consecutive first place.

== Nutritional information ==
In 2007, North Yorkshire Trading Standards conducted a survey of 25 fast food dishes. A large parmo with chips and salad they tested contained about 2,600 calories and 150g of fat.

A chilled Parmo from Jeff the Chef, which is baked rather than deep-fried, has an average of 450g and 600 calories.

== See also ==
- Escalope
