= Parmigiana =

Italian dish of eggplant with cheese and tomato sauce

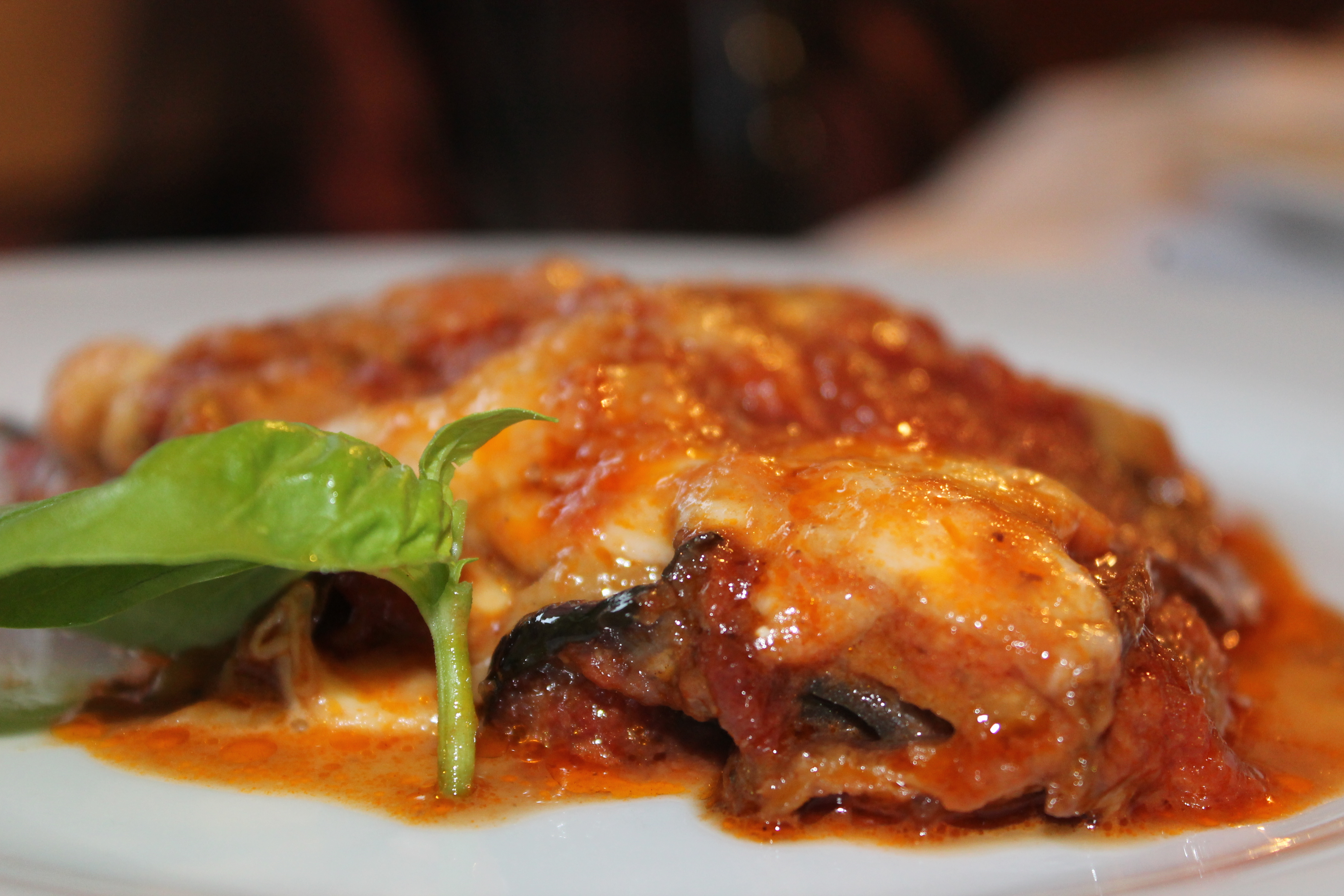
- Alternative names: Parmigiana di melanzane, melanzane alla parmigiana, eggplant parmesan
- Place of origin: Italy
- Region or state: Calabria; Campania; Apulia; Sicily
- Main ingredients: Eggplant, tomato sauce, mozzarella, Parmesan, extra virgin olive oil, basil

Parmigiana (/ˌpɑːrmɪˈdʒɑːnə, -ˈʒɑː-/, Italian: [parmiˈdʒaːna]) is an Italian dish made with fried, sliced eggplant layered with mozzarella cheese and tomato sauce, then baked. The origin of the dish is claimed by the regions of Calabria, Campania, Apulia, and Sicily.

In Italy, the dish is known under the names parmigiana di melanzane, (Note: Italian: [parmiˈdʒaːna di melanˈdzaːne; -ˈtsaːne]) melanzane alla parmigiana, (Note: Italian: [melanˈdzaːne; -ˈtsaːne ˌalla parmiˈdʒaːna]) and in the United States and Canada as eggplant parmesan.

== History ==
There are several theories about the origin of the dish. Its invention is frequently attributed to either Campania, Sicily or Parma, in Emilia-Romagna. The case for Parma is that parmigiana refers to Parma and because Parmesan cheese is produced there. Sicilian food writers have several different explanations for a Sicilian origin. According to author Pino Correnti, the word parmigiana derives from the Sicilian word for damigiana, a wicker sleeve used both for wine bottles and the hot casserole in which the dish would be prepared and served. Authors Mary Taylor Simeti, Vincent Schiavelli, Franca Colonna Romano Apostolo, and several others write that the name derives from the Sicilian word for 'louver', palmigiana or parmiciana; the angled horizontal slats of a louver would resemble the layering of eggplant slices in the dish.

Wright traces the origin of parmigiana to Naples. The ancestor of the modern dish appears in Vincenzo Corrado's 1786 cookbook Il cuoco galante, whose recipe describes eggplant seasoned with butter, herbs, cinnamon, other spices, and grated Parmesan cheese, then covered with a cream sauce of egg yolks before being baked in an oven. The modern version with Parmesan and tomato ragù as key ingredients appears several years later in Ippolito Cavalcanti's cookbook Cucina teorico-pratica, which was published in Naples in 1837. According to Wright, this suggests that the dish evolved in Naples during this time frame, which coincided with the increasing popularity of the tomato in Italian cuisine. Author Marlena Spieler agrees with a Neapolitan origin for the same reasons.

== Varieties ==
=== Italy ===
In Naples, parmigiana is also prepared using zucchini, fennel or artichokes in place of eggplants. Although it is baked, it is served tepid, often as a side or to begin a meal. It is a lighter dish than the version eaten in the US, containing less sauce and cheese, and with eggplant that is rarely breaded before frying. Preparations vary with the seasons, using fresh tomato and basil in the summer, and on occasion ragù in the winter. Other variations include the insertion of eggs between layers, either scrambled to help cohesion, or hard-boiled. In another version produced by monzù chefs, cocoa was mixed into the tomato sauce.

In the broader Campania region, parmiagana dishes are sometimes made without tomato sauce under the name "white parmiagana". Here, before the eggplant is fried, it is dipped in flour and a mixture of beaten egg, herbs and cheese, or simply fried without a coating. White parmiagana has become rare across the region, although it is still made in the town of Amalfi.

=== Outside Italy ===
In the United States and Canada, chicken parmigiana and veal parmigiana are frequently served as a main course, often with a side of pasta. The alternative anglicization parmesan is frequently used for the name, and the abbreviated form parm is common. The use of meats as an alternate to eggplant originated in the United States, where it was influenced by similar Italian dishes. A similar veal dish is known in Italian as cotoletta alla bolognese, which excludes tomato sauce, but includes melted Parmesan cheese and prosciutto. Food writer Arthur Schwartz suggests the method of frying eggplant in US preparations may derive from the older Amalfitano-Salernitano practice of layering eggplant fried after it has been dredged in flour and egg, mostly superseded in modern practice by lighter preparations.

Chicken parmigiana is also a common dish in Australia and is often served with a side of chips or salad. In Australia, where the name is often shortened to parma or parmi, it may also contain a variety of toppings, including sliced ham or bacon.

In Argentina, Brazil, Chile, and neighbouring countries, veal or chicken parmigiana is topped with ham and served with French fries or rice. It is known as milanesa a la napolitana. If the dish is topped with a fried egg, it is known as milanesa a caballo, but omits the tomato sauce. In Brazil, beef steak parmegiana is called bife à parmegiana.

In England, parmo uses either pork or chicken topped with béchamel sauce instead of tomato sauce and sometimes topped with other ingredients.

== See also ==
Media related to Parmigiana at Wikimedia Commons

- List of eggplant dishes
- List of veal dishes
