= Tomato sauce =

Sauce made primarily from tomatoes

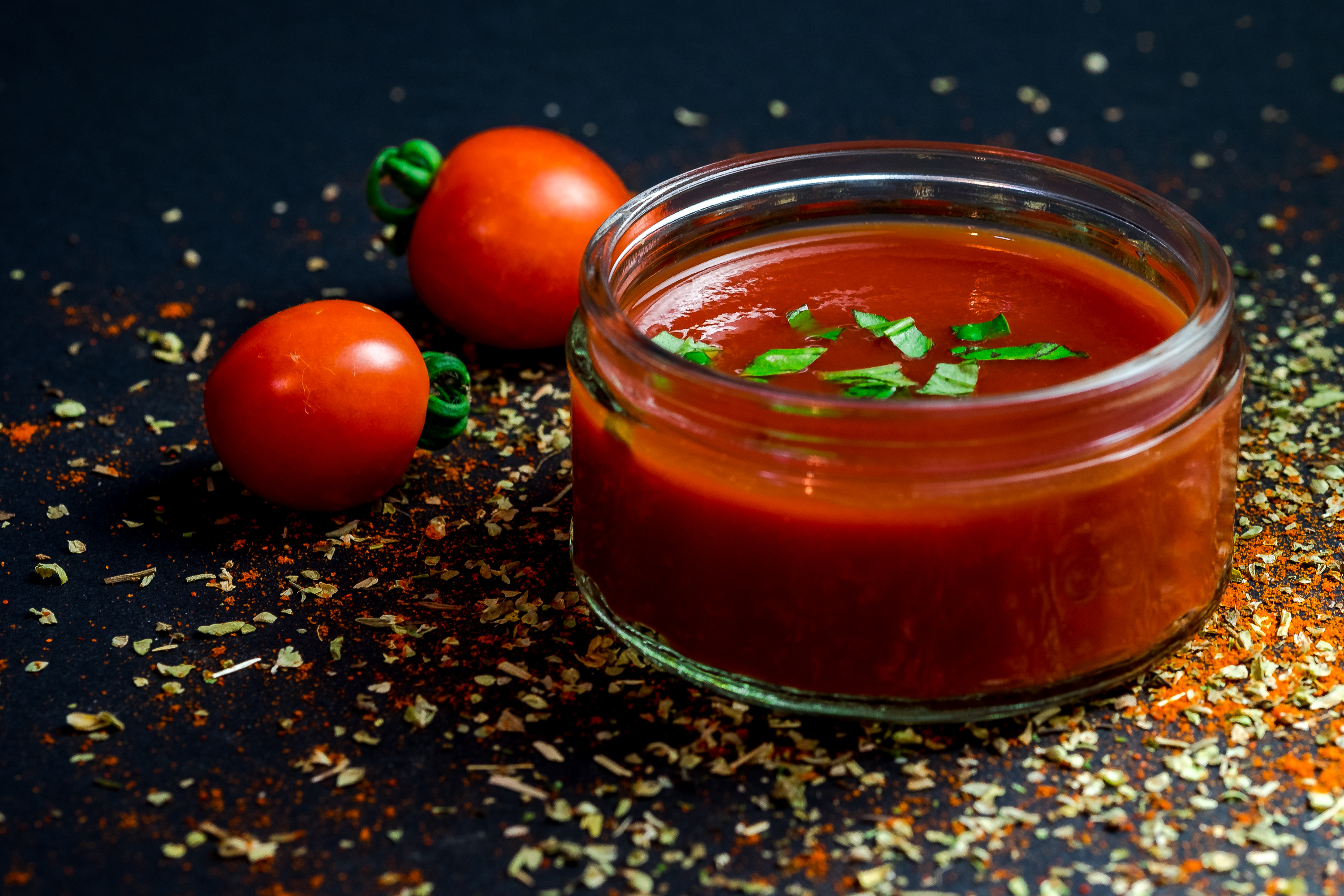
- Fresh tomato sauce
- Type: Sauce
- Place of origin: Mexico
- Region or state: Aztec Empire
- Main ingredients: Tomatoes
- Variations: Salsa picante

Tomato sauce can refer to many different sauces made primarily from tomatoes. In some countries the term refers to a sauce to be served as part of a dish; in others, it is a condiment. Tomatoes have a rich flavor, high water content, soft flesh which breaks down easily, and the right composition to thicken into a sauce when stewed, without the need for thickeners such as roux or masa. All of these qualities make them ideal for simple and appealing sauces. Tomato sauce typically has a thinner consistency than tomato paste and tomato purée; however, tomato sauces may use either as an ingredient.

In dishes tomato sauces are common for meat and vegetables such as in stews, but they are perhaps best known as bases for Italian pasta or pizza dishes, or in Mexican salsas.

== History ==
Tomato sauces, along with similarly related and prepared tomatillo sauces, are presumed to have been in use since antiquity by the peoples of Central and South America as bases for many dishes. However, much of Pre-Columbian cuisine history in Mexico, along with other culturally significant information, had been purged during the periods of conquest by Europeans, chiefly the Spanish. Bernardino de Sahagún, a Franciscan friar from the Kingdom of Spain, is believed to be the first European to write about tomato sauce after encountering it for sale in the markets of Tenochtitlan (today Mexico City).

The first Italian recipe of tomato sauce was published under the name "Spanish tomato sauce" in Lo Scalco alla Moderna ('The Modern Steward'), written by Italian chef Antonio Latini and published in two volumes in 1692 and 1694. Here is where we find the first mention of tomatoes being mixed with olive oil, onion, garlic, chili, and herbs. Tomato sauce also began to be used in the cuisine of the south of France at the same time, particularly in Provence and the Basque Country. The Provençals who went to Paris for the National Federation Day of July 14, 1790, demanded tomatoes everywhere they went. The use of tomato sauce with pasta appeared for the first time in 1790 in the Italian cookbook L'Apicio moderno, by Roman chef Francesco Leonardi.

The first written recipe for canned tomatoes comes from Vaucluse, in southern France; it appears in a document written by an individual in 1795.

== Raw tomato sauces ==
In Italy, there are many pasta sauces based on raw, uncooked tomatoes. In Mexico, the best-known raw tomato sauce is pico de gallo, also known as salsa cruda.

In France, raw tomato sauce is known as saoussoun in the Alpes-Maritimes. Sauce vierge is another French sauce made from raw tomato, basil, lemon juice and olive oil, created and popularized by chef Michel Guérard in 1976 as part of his nouvelle cuisine movement. The sauce bears similarities to Mexican pico de gallo, which predates it by several centuries, leading some culinary writers to note the resemblance between the two fresh tomato preparations, with a Greedy Gourmet source noting it "reminds of the Mexican pico de gallo".

== Varieties ==
=== Mexico ===
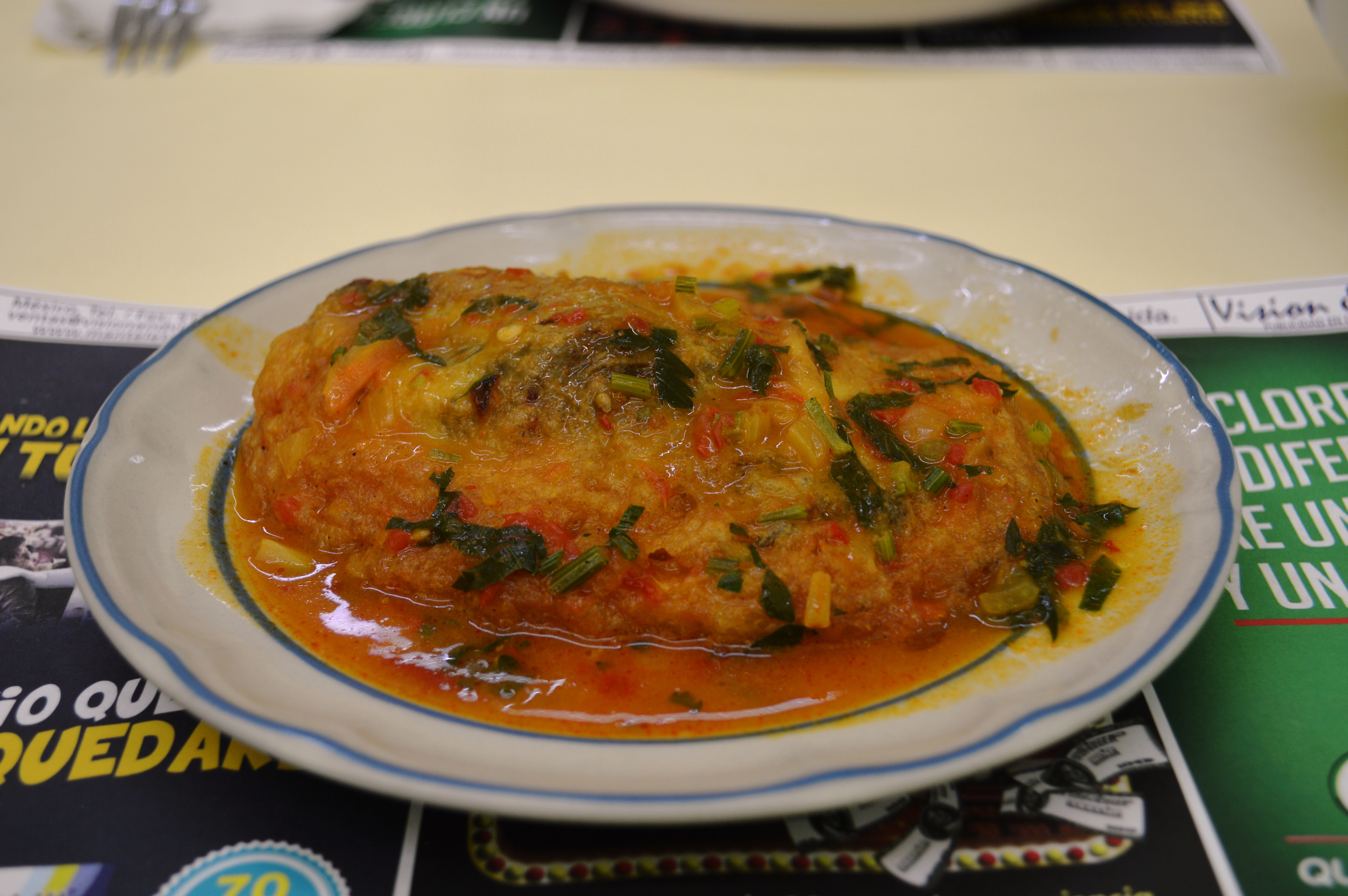
Chile relleno covered in tomato sauce served at a traditional fonda restaurant

Tomato sauce was an ancient condiment in Mesoamerican food. The first person to write about what may have been a tomato sauce was Bernardino de Sahagún, a Spanish Franciscan friar who later moved to New Spain, who made note of a prepared sauce that was offered for sale in the markets of Tenochtitlan (Mexico City today). He wrote (translated from Spanish),

They sell some stews made of peppers and tomatoes – usually put in them peppers, pumpkin seeds, tomatoes, green peppers and fat tomatoes and other things that make tasty stews.

— Florentine Codex (1540–1585)

Basic Mexican tomato sauce was traditionally prepared using a molcajete to puree the tomatoes. Food that is cooked in tomato sauce is known as entomatada. Tomato sauce is used as a base for spicy sauces and moles.

=== Italy ===
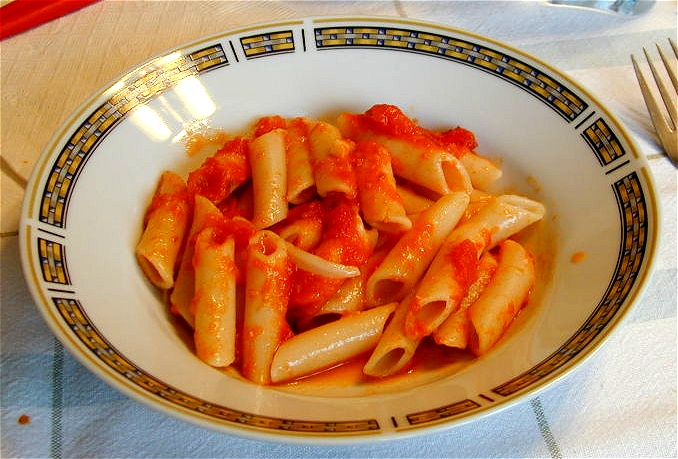
Penne pasta served with tomato sauce

Tomato sauce in Italian cuisine is first mentioned in Antonio Latini's cookbook Lo scalco alla moderna (Naples, 1692). Latini was chef to the Spanish viceroy of Naples, and one of his tomato recipes is for sauce "in the Spanish style" (Italian: alla spagnola). The first known use of tomato sauce with pasta appears in the Italian cookbook L'Apicio moderno, by the Roman chef Francesco Leonardi, published in 1790.

Tomato-garlic sauce is prepared using tomatoes as a main ingredient, and is used in various cuisines and dishes. In Italian cuisine, alla pizzaiola is tomato-garlic sauce, which is used on pizza, pasta and meats. Many varieties of tomato sauce exist in Italy that can be meat, fish, alcohol, or vegetable based.

=== France ===
Sauce tomate (French pronunciation: [sos tɔmat]) is one of the five mother sauces of classical French cooking, as codified by Auguste Escoffier in the early 20th century. It consists of salt belly of pork, onions, bay leaves, thyme, tomato purée or fresh tomatoes, roux, garlic, salt, sugar, and pepper.

Tomato sauce can also be served raw, in which case it is named saoussoun (grated raw tomato with onions, olive oil and herbs), or sauce vierge ([sos viɛʁʒ]; diced raw tomato with olive oil, lemon, garlic, and basil).

=== Australia, New Zealand, and South Africa ===
Tomato sauce is a popular, commercially produced table sauce, similar to tomato ketchup, which is typically applied to foods such as meat pies, sausages, and fish and chips. Tomato sauce tends to be more sour due to taste preference for sour adopted from the English and Europeans; while Americans tend to prefer sweeter flavours with American Ketchup being sweeter and thicker. According to Heinz, Ketchup contains more tomatoes, with Australian Heinz Tomato Ketchup stating that it contains "162g of Tomatoes per 100mL" equating to 77% concentrated tomatoes, while other tomato sauce brands have tomato concentrations (from paste or puree) between 75 and 85%.

Tomato-based sauces served with pasta are commonly referred to as "pasta sauce", and a strained, uncooked tomato purée is called passata.

=== United Kingdom ===
Collins English Dictionary lists the term as "another name for tomato ketchup" in British English.

=== Canada and United States ===
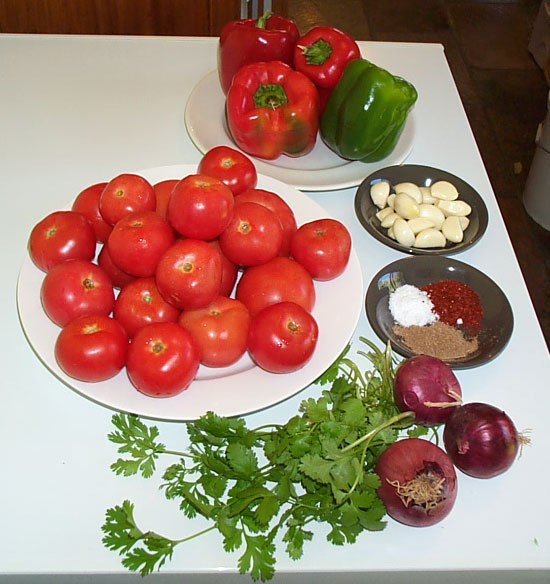
Ingredients such as bell pepper and coriander that may be used in a sauce

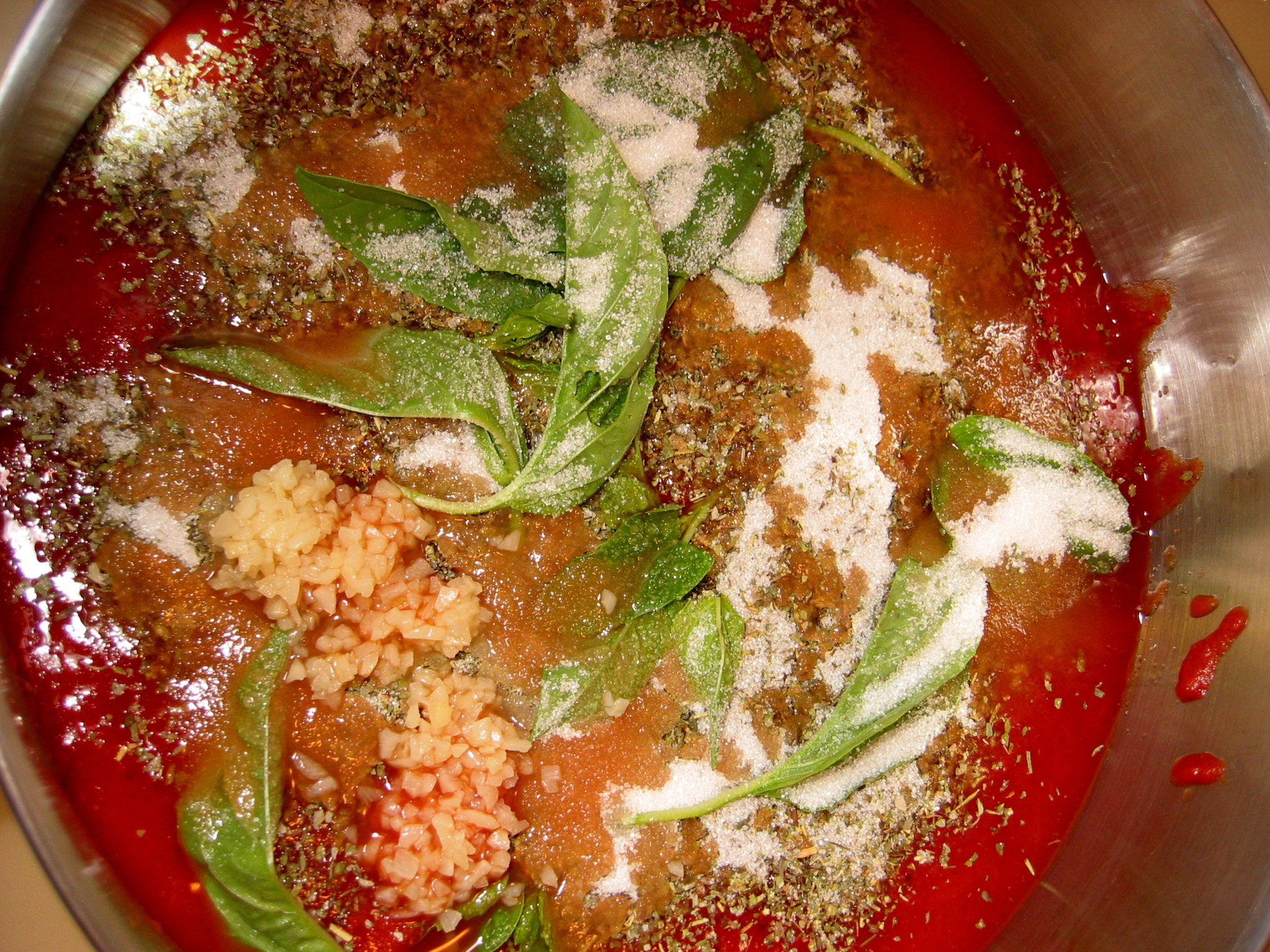
Ingredients added to the sauce without browning

In Canada and the U.S., tomato sauce is typically sold jarred or canned, with minimal ingredients, and is not normally used as is. Related ingredients are tomato purée and tomato paste, each of which is similar but paste has a thicker consistency. Tomato purée and tomato paste have US FDA standards of identity (since 1939) for percentage of tomato solids, and historically did not contain seasonings other than salt; in recent decades variants with basil or other traditional Italian seasonings became common. Tomato sauce is non-standardized.

==== Tomato gravy ====
Tomato gravy is originally an Italian American term for a tomato sauce cooked with meat, "gravy" being an Americanized form of ragù. Tomato gravy was associated with Sunday dinner in Italian American households from the 19th century onwards, and was also called "Sunday gravy". Although the origins was a dish with more meat than tomatoes, tomato gravy soon developed into a tomato sauce that often had no pieces of meat, but included animal fat. Typically, tomato gravy is served over pasta.

=== India ===
Some Indian curries have a tomato-based sauce, notably many vegetarian-style dishes.

== See also ==
- List of tomato dishes
