= Die block =

Die block may refer to:

- A component of a Die (manufacturing)
- A component of a valve gear, such as Walschaerts valve gear
