= Macaroni =

Type of pasta

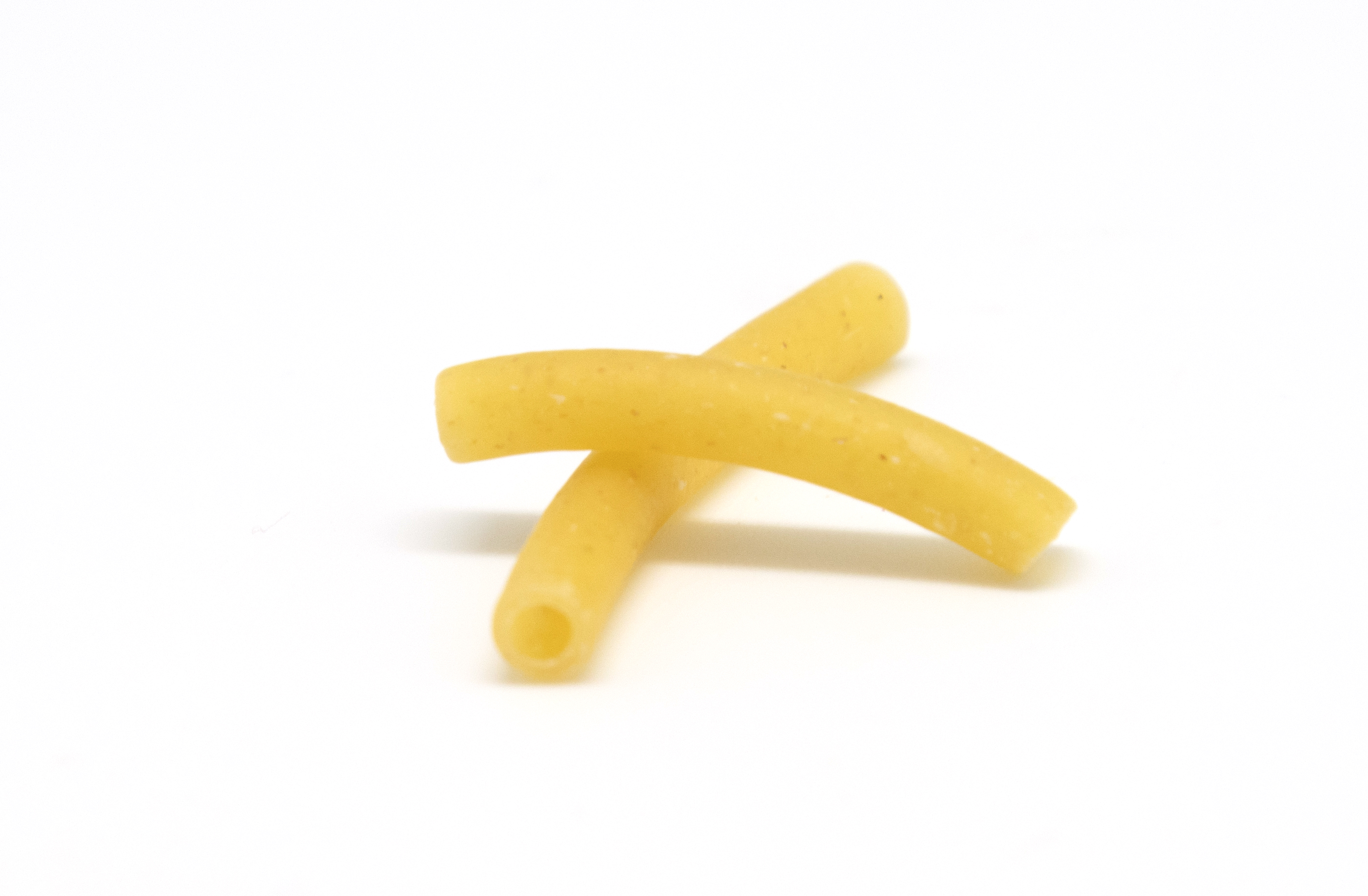
- Alternative names: Maccheroni (in Italian)
- Type: Pasta
- Place of origin: Italy
- Main ingredients: Durum wheat
- Food energy (per 100 g serving): 350.5 kcal (1,466 kJ)
Nutritional value
(per 100 g serving)
- Protein: 13 g
- Fat: 2 g
- Carbohydrate: 70 g

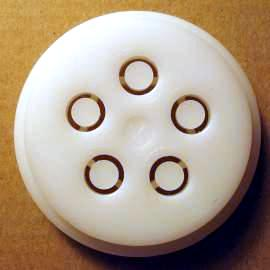
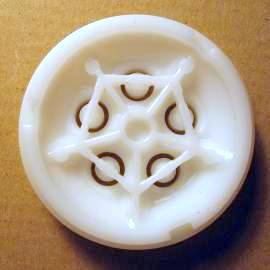
Elbow macaroni die: front view (left) and rear view (right)

Macaroni (/ˌmækəˈroʊni/), known in Italian as maccheroni, is a pasta shaped like narrow tubes. Made with durum wheat, macaroni is commonly cut in short lengths; curved macaroni may be referred to as "elbow macaroni". Some home machines can make macaroni shapes but, like most pasta, macaroni is usually made commercially by large-scale extrusion. The common curved shape is created by different speeds of extrusion on opposite sides of the pasta tube as it comes out of the machine.

The word macaroni is often used synonymously with elbow-shaped macaroni, as it is the variety most often used in macaroni and cheese recipes. In Italy and other countries, the noun maccheroni can refer to straight, tubular, square-ended pasta corta (lit. 'short pasta') or to long pasta dishes, as in maccheroni alla chitarra, which is prepared with long pasta such as spaghetti. In the United States, federal regulations define three shapes of dried pasta (macaroni, spaghetti, and vermicelli) as falling under the label of "macaroni product".

== Etymology ==
In Italian, maccheroni refers to elongated pasta, not necessarily in tubular form. This general meaning is still retained outside Rome and in different languages which borrowed the word.

Maccheroni comes from Italian maccheroni (Italian: [makkeˈroːni]), plural form of maccherone. The academic consensus supports the position that the word is derived from the Greek μακαρία (makaría), In turn, that comes from μάκαρες (mákares), meaning the 'blessed ones, blessed dead', the plural of μάκαρ (mákar), which means 'blessed, happy'; μακάριος (makários, from μάκαρ (mákar) + -ιος (-ios, adjective suffix)) and Μακάριος (Makários), 'Makarios' (Latinized form: Macarius), are derived terms. The many varieties sometimes differ from each other because of the texture of each pasta: rigatoni and tortiglioni, for example, have ridges down their lengths, while chifferi, lumache, lumaconi, pipe, pipette, etc. refer to elbow-shaped pasta similar to macaroni in North American culture.

However, the Italian linguist G. Alessio argues that the word can have two origins. The first is the Medieval Greek μακαρώνεια (makarṓneia), 'dirge' (stated in sec. XIII by James of Bulgaria), which would mean 'funeral meal' and then 'food to serve' during this office (see modern Eastern Thrace's μαχαρωνιά (makharōniá)—macharōnia in the sense of 'rice-based dish served at the funeral'), in which case, the term would be composed of the double root of μακάριος (makários), 'blessed', and αἰωνίως (aiōníōs), 'eternally'. The second is the Greek μακαρία (makaría), 'barley broth', which would have added the suffix -one.

In his book Delizia! The Epic History of Italians and their Food (2007), the British author, historian and academic John Dickie instead states that the word macaroni, and its earlier variants such as maccheroni, "comes from maccare, meaning to pound or crush".

The word first appears in English as makerouns in the 1390 The Forme of Cury, which records the earliest recipe for macaroni and cheese.

== Outside Italy ==
As is the case with dishes made with other types of pasta, macaroni cheese is a popular dish and is often made with elbow macaroni. This is called mac and cheese in the United States. A similar dish, Älplermagronen, with a base of cream and cheese originated in Switzerland in the 19th century. In 7th century Crete, the locals prepared makarogia (Greek: µακαρώγια), a pasta-like dish, usually spicing it with saffron. In Great Britain, particularly Scotland, macaroni cheese is a popular filling for pies, often consumed as a takeaway food or at football grounds. A sweet macaroni, known as macaroni pudding, containing milk and sugar (and rather similar to a rice pudding), was also popular with the British during the Victorian era. A popular canned variety is still manufactured by Ambrosia and sold in UK supermarkets.

In areas with large populations open to Western cultural influence such as Hong Kong, Macao, Malaysia, and Singapore, the local Chinese have adopted macaroni as an ingredient for Chinese-style Western cuisine. In Hong Kong's cha chaan teng ('tea restaurants') and Southeast Asia's kopitiam ('coffee shops'), macaroni is cooked in water and then rinsed to remove starch, and served in clear broth with ham or frankfurter sausages, peas, black mushrooms, and optionally eggs, reminiscent of noodle soup dishes. This is often a course for breakfast or light lunch fare. Macaroni has also been incorporated into Malay Malaysian cuisine, where it is stir-fried akin to mee goreng using Asian seasoning similar to said noodle dish (i.e. shallots, oyster sauce, and chili paste).

== See also ==
- List of pasta
- Macaroni art
