= Pasta processing =

Process of making pasta

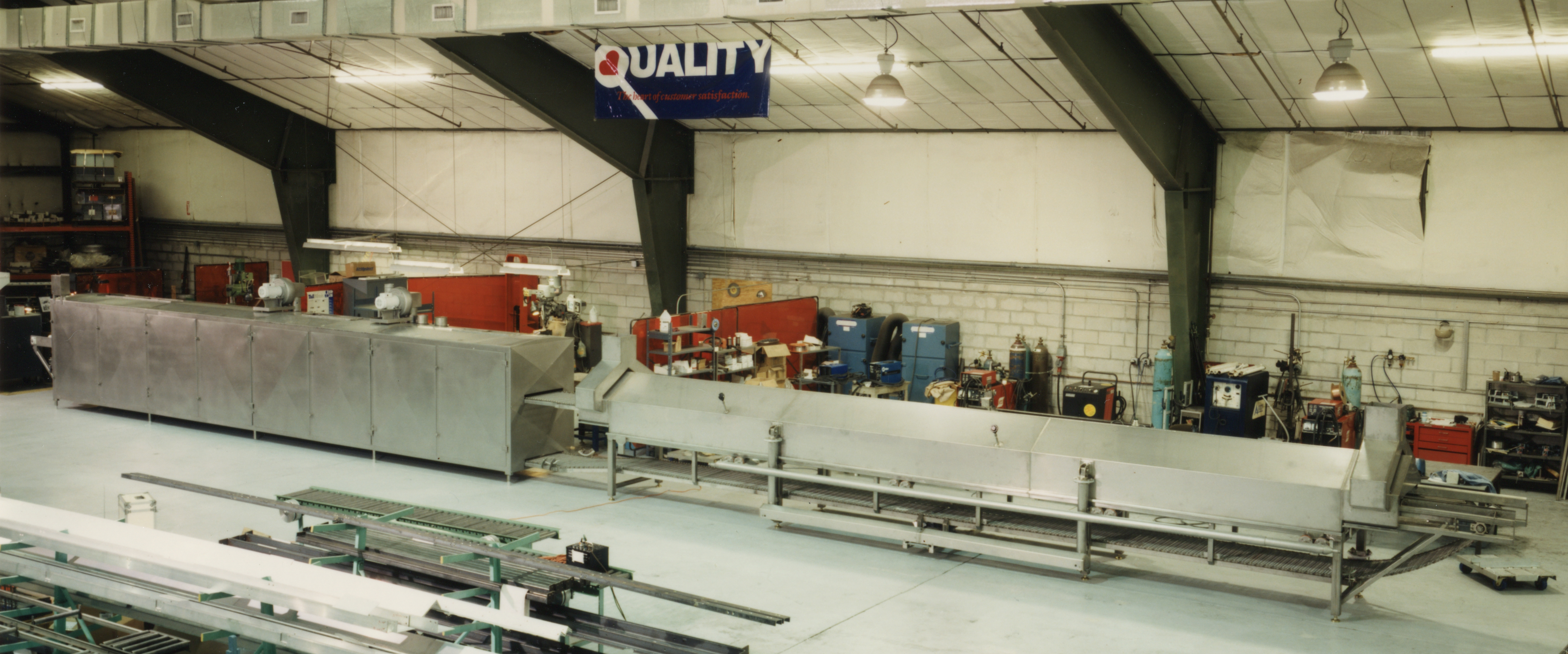
Pasta processing machines consisting of a dryer (left) and a steamer, used to produce fresh pasta

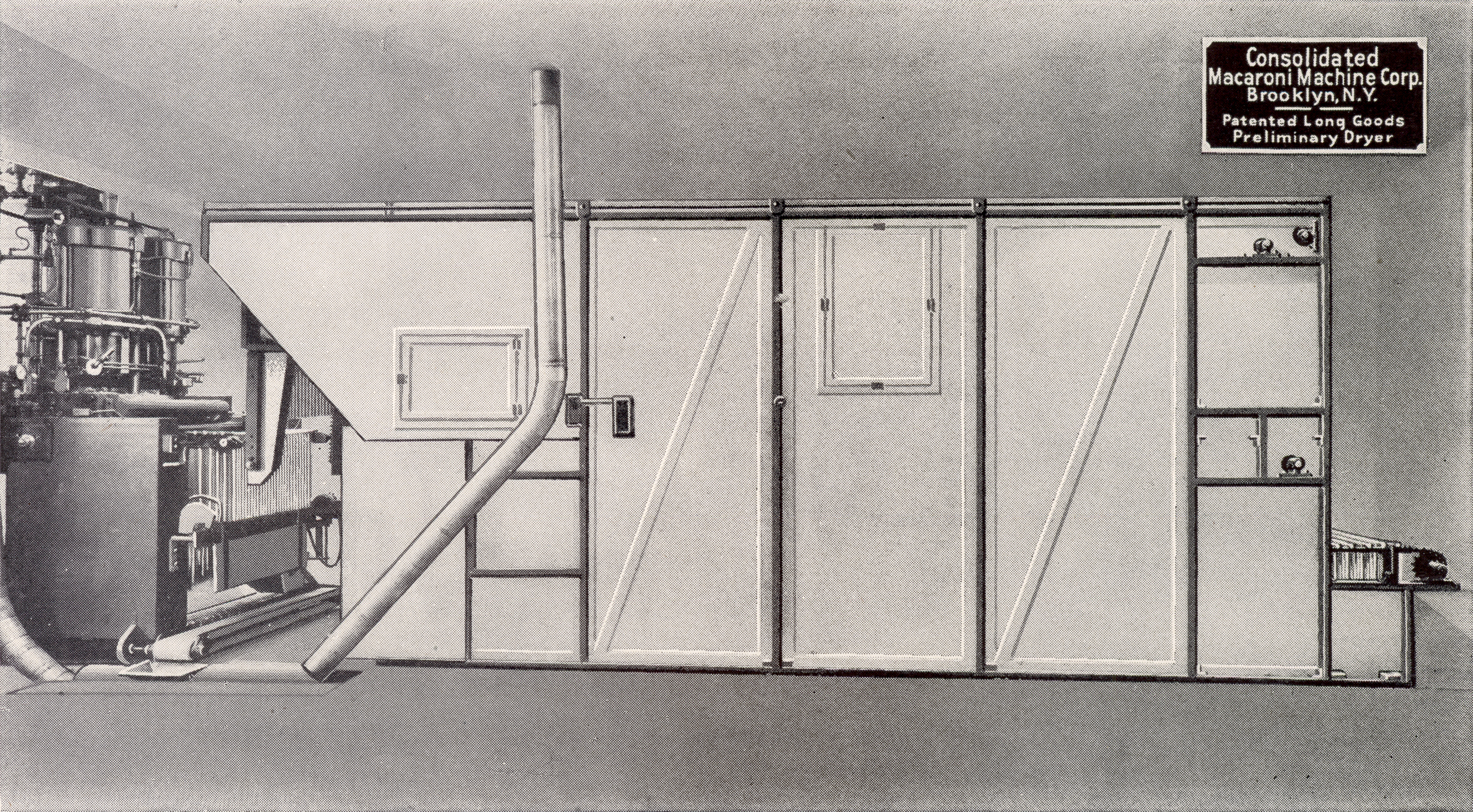
One of the first automated and continuous long goods dry pasta lines consisting of a hydraulic press, hydraulic spreader and long paste preliminary dryer with sweat chamber

Pasta processing is the process in which wheat semolina or flour is mixed with water and the dough is extruded to a specific shape, dried and packaged.

Durum wheat semolina or flour, common farina or flour, or combination of both is mixed with water and eggs (for egg noodles) and other optional ingredients (such as spinach, tomato, herbs, etc.). Usually 25–30 kg of water is added per 100 kg of semolina. The amounts are measured by computerized dispensers. The mixture is then kneaded by auger extruder equipped with mixing paddles and kneading blades to obtain a homogeneous mass, and after that is extruded through various shaped dies. Drying process begins immediately after the products are shaped to prevent deformation and sticking. The pastas are dried completely in drying chambers and stabilized, then ready for packaging. In modern factories, dry pasta is processed using automatic continuous lines.

== Mixing ==
In this level wheat semolina and water are mixed by the ratio of 3 to 1. Water should be pure, with no off-flavor and suitable for drinking. Its temperature is about 35–45 °C to help speed up absorption. For egg noodles, eggs are added in the form of fresh eggs, frozen eggs, dry eggs, egg yolks or dry egg solids. If eggs are added to the mixture, the amount of water is modified. Adding egg improves the nutritional quality and richness of the pasta. Disodium phosphate is also added to reduce the cooking time.

Mixing the semolina and water takes place in two stages. First, the ingredients are measured and added to a pre-mixer, and then they are transferred to a mixing chamber which finalizes the mixing process and produces a homogeneous mass.

=== Measuring the raw material ===
The exact amount of raw materials is very important. Semolina dosing is done by two methods: volumetric feed (measurement by volume), and gravimetric feed (measurement by weight). In volumetric feed, a specific volume of semolina is measured by variable speed screws or rotary air-lock valves. This method is not very accurate since the amount depends on the density of the semolina. In gravimetric feed, semolina is weighed by a variable speed transport system, which is equipped with a device measuring the flow. Although this method is more accurate, it is more expensive and needs to be isolated. There are different ways to determine the flow in gravimetric feeds:

Conveyor Belt Feeds: in which one specific portion of the belt is weighed and the speed of the belt is used to calculate the semolina flow.

Loss-in Weight Feeds: in which the change in weight of the hopper which the semolina is poured from indicates the semolina flow.

Slanted Surface System: in which the movements of variable speed extraction elements (such as screws and bolts) are measured by the electronic devices and are converted to the semolina flow.

The exact amount of water needed for the dough depends on the final shape of the pasta. Long pastas should have less moisture content (and therefore less water) so they will be able to stretch during the extrusion. Short pastas need less moisture content due to rapid cutting. Various dosing systems are used to pump the water to the mixture. The most common ones are piston pumps in which the water flow rate is controlled by adjusting the piston stroke, screw feeder, and gear and lobe pumps where the speed of the rotation determines the water flow. In more advanced systems, electronic devices are used to regulate the water flow.

=== Pre-mixer ===
The measured amounts of water and semolina are mixed together in pre-mixer to form a crumbly dough. The traditional type of pre-mixer is a trough with a cylindrical section inside which rotates a mixing shaft with blades. More advanced systems use a high-speed (centrifuge) pre-mixer in which water and semolina are sprayed into the chamber, so that each particle of semolina absorbs the correct amount of water.

=== Final mixing ===
The final mixer is a trough with shafts which are equipped with mixing blades. Both shafts and blades are made of stainless steel. The shafts run at a low speed (70 rpm) to mix the raw ingredients into a dough. This process usually takes 10–20 minutes.

Some mixers work under atmospheric pressure and others under vacuum. If vacuum is used, the mixture goes directly into the extrusion chamber. When the mixer works under atmospheric pressure, a vacuum unit (vacuum mixer) conveys the mixture to the extrusion chamber.

== Extrusion ==
Extrusion is the process of kneading and shaping at the same time and in the matter of a few minutes. This process takes place in an extruder which is a grooved extrusion cylinder equipped with an extrusion worm which is a shaft with deep thread around its core. The extrusion worm kneads and moves the dough forward and presses it through the dies in the head of the extruder. The longitudinal grooves in the cylinder reduce the friction and improve the movement of the dough. Both the worm and the cylinder are made of stainless steel, but the worm has a Teflon coating to decrease friction.

The temperature of the dough should remain between 40 and 45 °C. If the temperature exceeds 50 °C the gluten network would be damaged, which has a negative effect on the quality of pasta. Since extra heat is generated by pressure and friction, there are water jackets around the cylinder and head. A large amount of water with high speed and temperature of 38–40 °C is circulated in jackets.

The cylinder also has an air vacuum chamber, which removes air bubbles from the dough before extruding. Otherwise small bubbles will form in the pasta and decrease the mechanical strength which cause breakage from hours to days after drying. The air also oxidizes the carotenoid or xanthophyll, which results in a white, chalky appearance of the pasta.

== Forming ==
There are different types and shapes of dies to form various shapes of pasta. Generally, pastas are categorized into two large groups: long pasta (such as spaghetti, fettuccine, linguine, etc.) and short pasta (such as elbow-shaped macaroni, penne, shells, etc.). Circular dies with rotating blades underneath them are used for short products, where long rectangular dies form the long products. The dies are made of Teflon-coated bronze. The extruder pushes the dough through the dies and blades or trimmers cut the dough in the desired length. Various patents cover machinery for extruding pasta of different shapes.

== Drying ==
Drying is one of the most difficult and critical parts of making pasta. If the pasta dries too fast, it may crack during or after the drying process and acquire a poor appearance and lowered mechanical strength. If the pasta dries too slowly, it may spoil and become moldy. Thus, the drying process must be carefully executed in order to avoid the two aforementioned consequences.

When the pasta leaves the dies it has the moisture content of 31%. The final desired moisture of the dried pasta is about 12%, in order for the pasta to be rigid and have a long storage life. The drying process is slightly different for long and short pastas, but in general, pasta is exposed to hot air to dehydrate the pasta. "Pre-drying" starts immediately after extrusion where the pasta hardens on the outside but is still soft on the inside. It takes one tenth of the whole drying time, and one third of the excess moisture is lost in this stage. "Final drying" removes most of the moisture and gives the pasta a firm shape. This stage consists of two phases: in the first phase the product is exposed to high temperatures and humidity and in the second phase the temperature is dropped quickly and cold air is provided for stabilizing. Stabilizing helps the remaining moisture to distribute evenly through the pasta and prevents cracking.

=== Long pasta drying ===
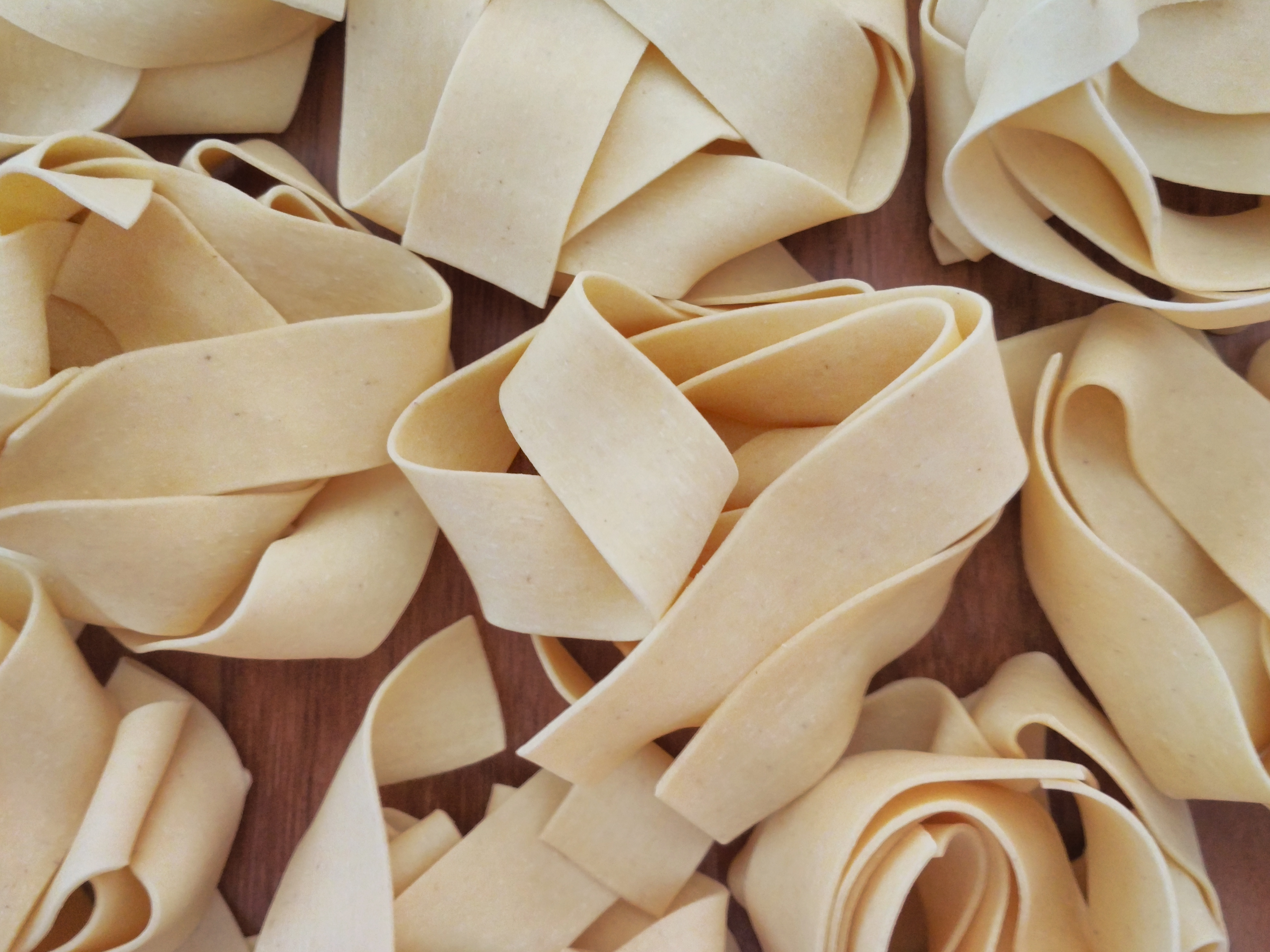
Dried pappardelle

The spreader hangs the strands of long pastas on the metal sticks where heated air flow is blown to prepare the product for high temperature. Pre-dryer reduces the moisture quickly (from 30% to 18%) in about an hour. Heat is produced by hot water radiators and centrifugal fans. For the first phase of the finish drying, product goes into a dryer with multi rows of hot water circulation plates. This phase decreases high rate of moisture and pasteurized the product. In the second phase warm air are blown to the product in an isolated multi-tier dryer and removes all the excess moisture.

=== Short pasta drying ===
Short pasta pieces fall on the shaker conveyor and powerful hot air is blown to them immediately after the extrusion. This reduces the moisture content by 5% and prevents the pieces from sticking and flattening. Shaker then carries the product through tiers with dry hot air and buckets collect the pasta and spread them on the upper tier of the multi-tier drying unit. This unit has four areas which periods of intense moisture extraction alternately followed by periods of rest occur at eight drying/stabilizing cycle in total. Process ends in cold air chamber for stabilizing.

== Packaging ==
There are two main packaging systems for dried pasta: cellophane bags which are moisture-proof, easy to use in automatic machines, but difficult to stack, and boxes which are easy to stack and print advertising, and protect the fragile pastas. In packaging line the product is first scaled, then sealed in the package, detected for open flap and metals, double-checked the weight and last packed in large cases.

Long pasta packaging: First the product is weighed by about five scales on a packaging line, then transferred to mechanical buckets which are fitted to the opening of the cartons. The system which is used for long pasta packaging is called horizontal cartoner in which buckets and cartons are both move forward on the packaging line and pasta is poured to the cartons by a mechanical pushing device from the bucket. The cartons then are closed and sealed.

Short pasta packaging: The process of packaging for short pasta are similar to those used for long pasta except that vertical cartoner is used in which the scaling unit is located over the cartoner and weighed pasta is dropped to the passing cartons using only gravity.

Flexible pouch packaging: Both long and short pasta can be packed in flexible plastic packaging materials. The system is called standard form/fill/seal system which is similar to carton packaging.

Plastic overwrapping packaging: The weighed product is manually placed onto a shallow rigid plastic tray and a plastic film is wrapped around the tray and overwrap the package. It then passes a heat tunnel which causes the film to shrink around the pasta.

== Batch production ==
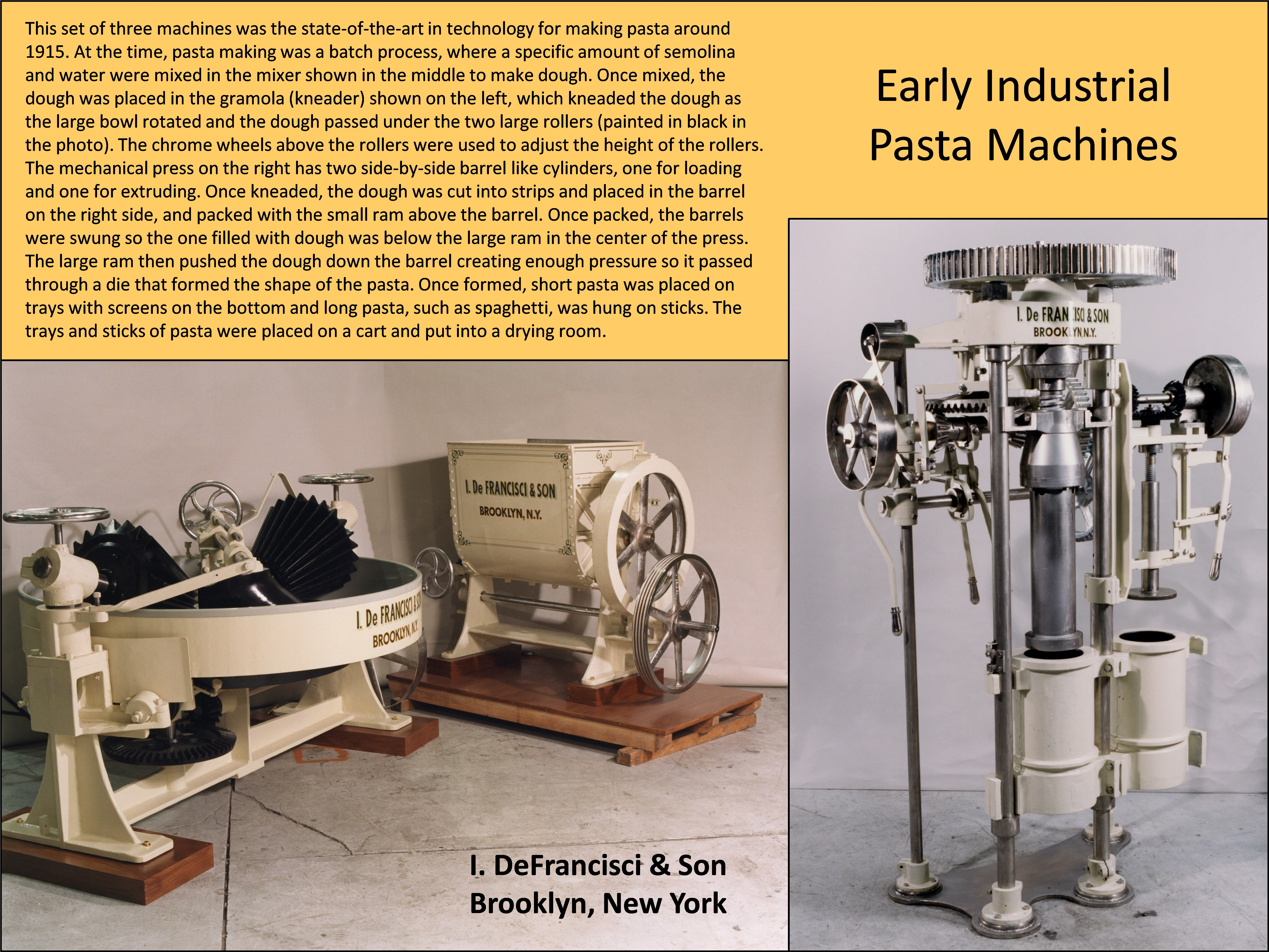
Batch production of pasta

Prior to the advent of the continuous production methods used today, manufacturers produced pasta using batch production. This method used a mixer, gramola or kneading machine and a mechanical or hydraulic press to push the dough through the die to form the shape. Once the pasta was made, it was typically dried in a drying room, taking two to four days to dry depending on the shape.

In the late 1930s, with advances in technology, commercial pasta factories began using automatic, continuous production equipment capable of producing pasta in higher volumes at lower costs. This led to the phasing out of batch production for large scale producers, however, many smaller pasta factories still use this method, but with extruders or sheeters instead of gramolas.
