= Food extrusion =

Food processing method

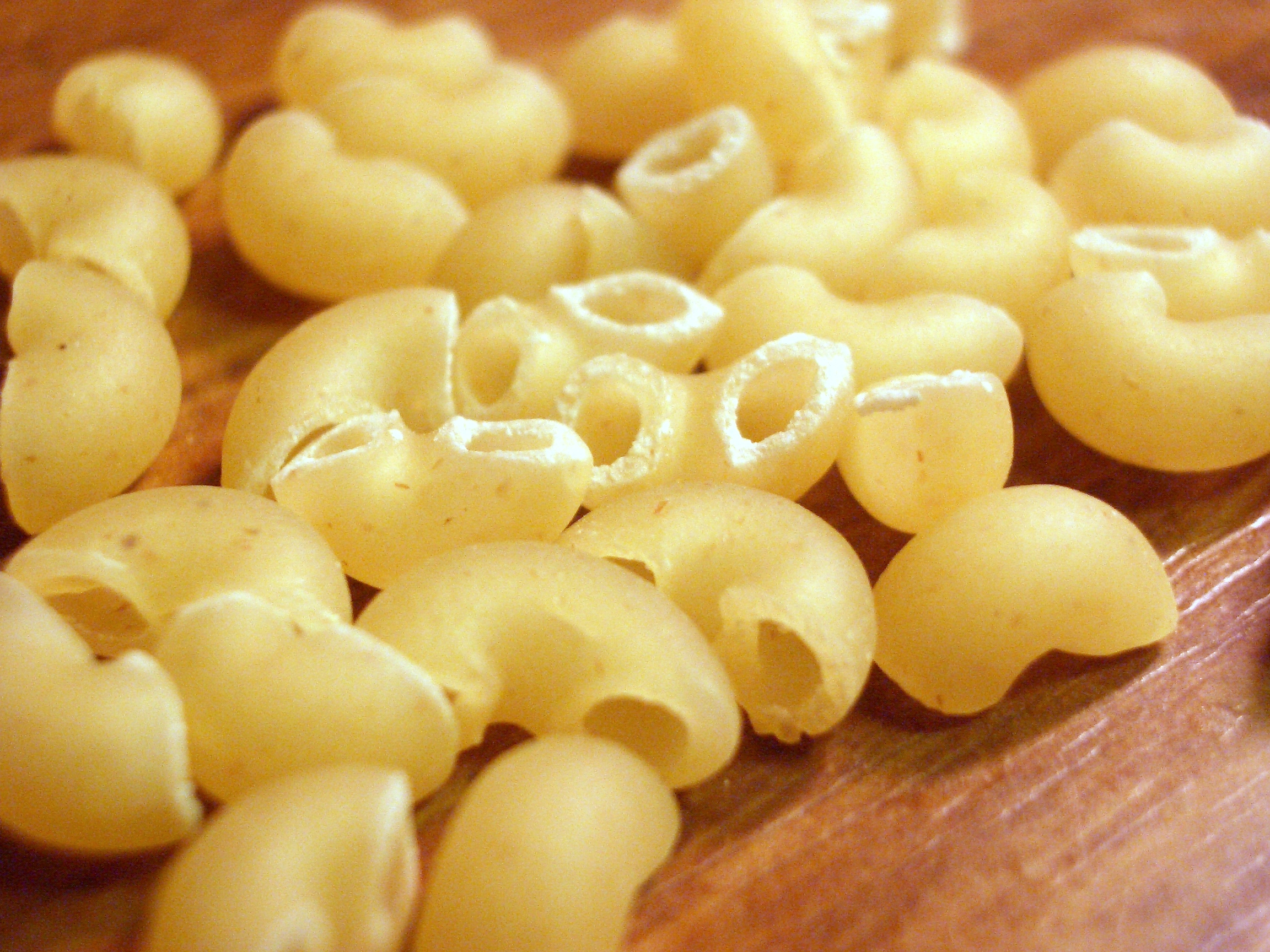
Macaroni is an extruded hollow pasta

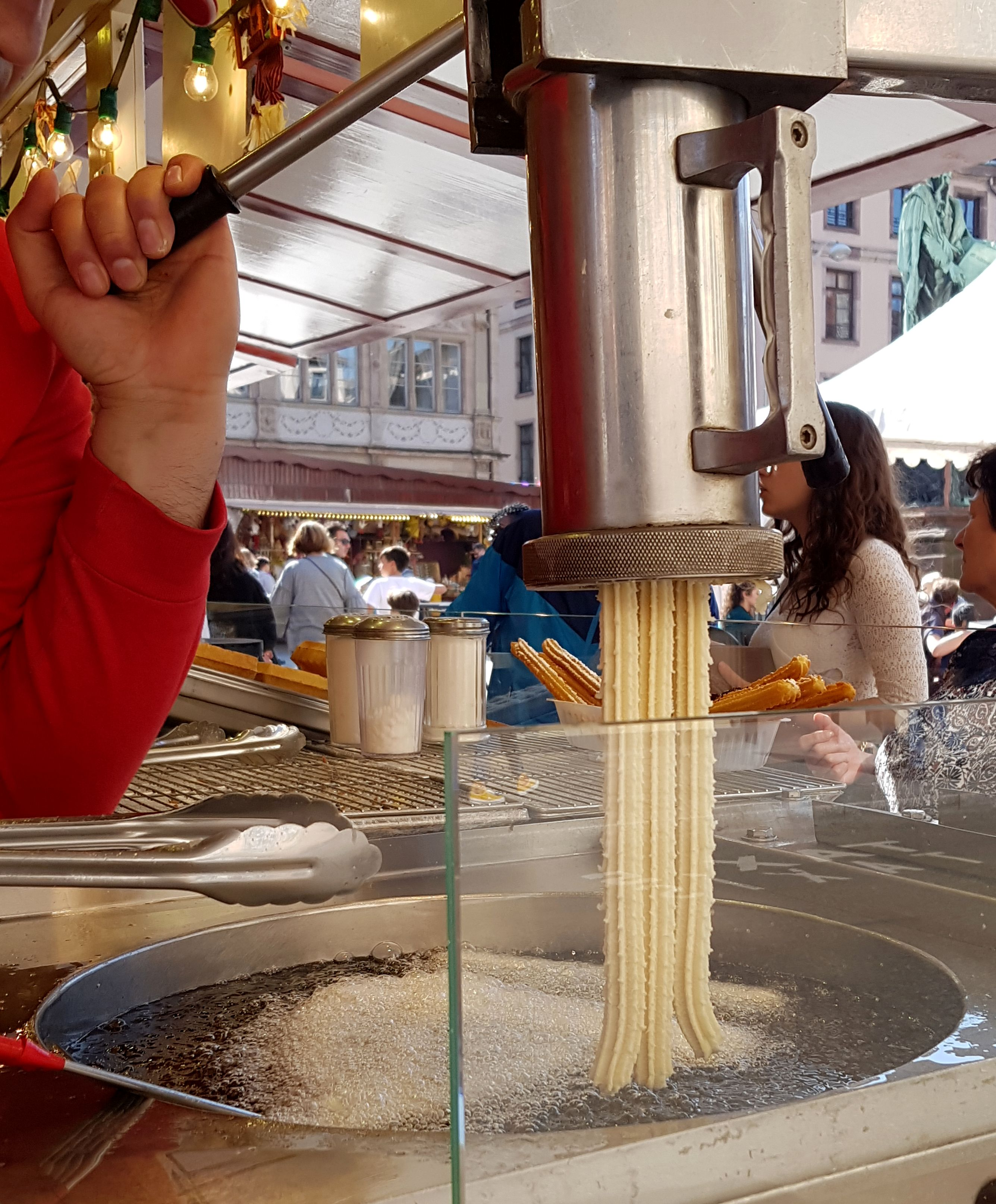
Extruding dough for churros in Strasbourg

Extrusion in food processing consists of forcing soft mixed ingredients through an opening in a perforated plate or die designed to produce the required shape. The extruded food is then cut to a specific size by blades. The machine which forces the mix through the die is an extruder, and the mix is known as the extrudate. The extruder is typically a large, rotating screw tightly fitting within a stationary barrel, at the end of which is the die. In some cases, "extrusion" is taken as synonymous with extrusion cooking, which cooks the food with heat as it is squeezed through the die.

Extrusion enables mass production of food via a continuous, efficient system that ensures uniformity of the final product. Products made through extrusion (without simultaneous cooking) include pasta, breads (croutons, bread sticks, and flat breads), pre-made cookie dough, and sausages. Products made through extrusion cooking include many breakfast cereals and ready-to-eat snacks, confectionery, some baby foods, full-fat soy flour, textured vegetable protein, some beverages, and dry and semi-moist pet foods. Food products manufactured using extrusion usually have a high starch content.

== Process ==
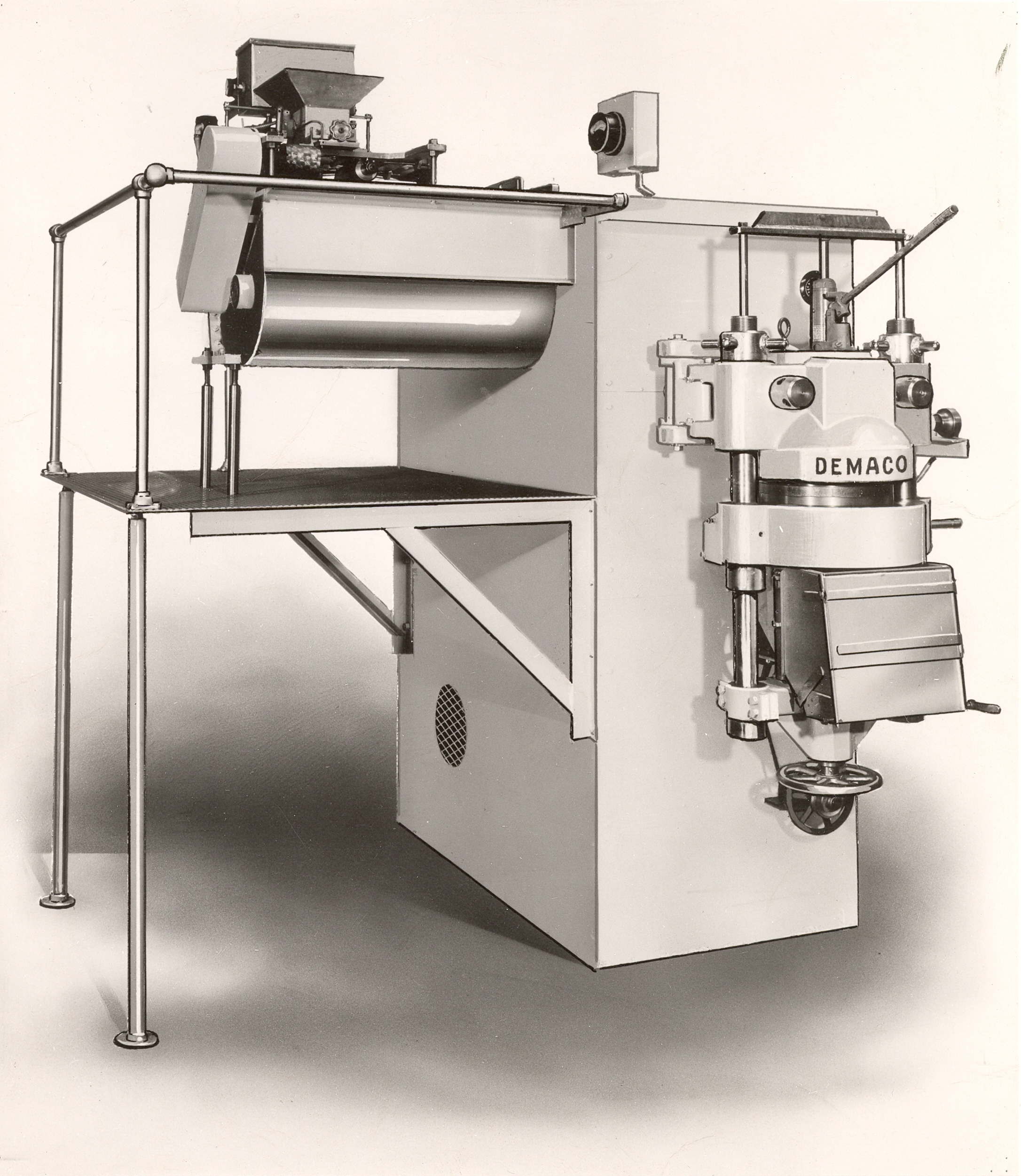
A non-vacuum short goods pasta extruder from 1958

=== Extrusion cooking ===
In the extrusion cooking process, raw materials are first ground to the correct particle size, usually the consistency of coarse flour. The dry mix is passed through a pre-conditioner, in which other ingredients are added depending on the target product; these may be liquid sugar, fats, dyes, meats or water. Steam is injected to start the cooking process, and the preconditioned mix (extrudate) is then passed through an extruder. The extruder is a large, rotating screw tightly fitting within a stationary barrel, at the end of which is the die. The extruder's rotating screw forces the extrudate towards and through the die. The extrudate is in the extruder for the residence time.

Many extruded products puff and change texture as they are extruded because of the reduction of forces and release of moisture and heat. The extent to which it does so is known as the expansion ratio. The extrudate is cut to the desired length by blades at the output of the extruder, which rotate about the die openings at a specific speed. The product is then cooled and dried, becoming rigid while maintaining porosity.

Cooking takes place within the extruder, where the product produces its own friction and heat due to the pressure generated (10–20 bar). The process can induce both protein denaturation and starch gelatinization under some conditions.

Many food extrusion processes involve a high temperature for a short time. Important factors of the extrusion process are the composition of the extrudate, screw length and rotating speed, barrel temperature and moisture, die shape, and rotating speed of the blades. These are controlled based on the desired product to ensure uniformity of the output.

Moisture is the most important of these factors, and affects the mix viscosity, acting to plasticize the extrudate. Increasing moisture will decrease viscosity, torque, and product temperature, and increase bulk density. This will also reduce the pressure at the die. Most extrusion processes for food processing are carried out at low to intermediate moisture (moisture level below 40%). High-moisture extrusion is known as wet extrusion, but it was not used much before the introduction of twin screw extruders (TSE), which have a more efficient conveying capability. The most important rheological factor in the wet extrusion of high-starch extrudate is temperature.

The amount of salt in the extrudate may determine the colour and texture of some extruded products. The expansion ratio and airiness of the product depend on the salt concentration in the extrudate, possibly as a result of a chemical reaction between the salt and the starches in the extrudate. Colour changes as a result of salt concentration may be caused by "the ability of salt to change the water activity of the extrudate and thus change the rate of browning reactions". Salt is also used to distribute minor ingredients, such as food colours and flavours, after extrusion; these are more evenly distributed over the product's surface after being mixed with salt.

== History ==
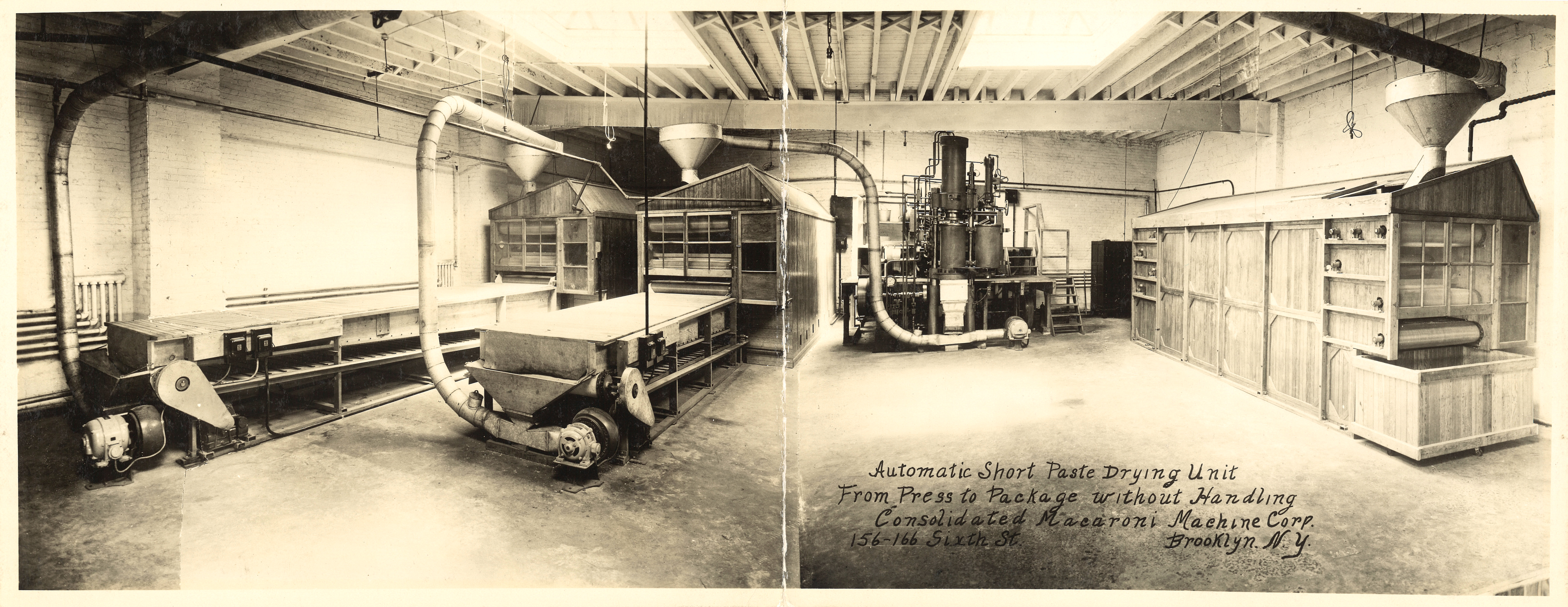
Dry pasta manufacturing line from 1930s

The first extruder was designed to manufacture sausages in the 1870s. Dry pasta has been produced by extrusion since the 1930s, and the method has been applied to tater tots (first extruded potato product: Ore-Ida in 1953). Some domestic kitchen appliances such as meat grinders and some types of pasta makers use extrusion. Pastry bags (piping bags), squeezed by hand, operate by extrusion.

The first extrusion cooking machine was the expanding pelleting machine from Wenger Mixer Manufacturing from 1954. Its first mentioned use seems to be with Purina in 1957, which developed extruded food for dogs, monkeys, and fish. In 1963, the USDA and UNICEF tested a full fat soy flour produced from extrusion-cooked soybeans as a source of nutrients for children. Milk substitutes were later developed from this flour. In 1966, the US government started providing a CSM (Corn-Soya-Milk) formula to protein-deficient children in the Third World. The later Meals for Millions project also prominently featured soy flour in its Multi-Purpose Food (MPF), a high-protein food supplement that could be made for just three cents per meal.

The idea of using extrusion cooking to produce breakfast cereal has been mentioned since the Wegner patent of 1960. In 1970, the Israeli Shefa Protein Industries introduced a line of breakfast cereal called Krunch, made from cereal flour and full-fat soy flour. It's unclear whether there has been an earlier breakfast cereal made from extruded products. Meat analogues have been made through extrusion since 1969.

== Effects ==
Extrusion enables mass production of food via a continuous, efficient system that ensures uniformity of the final product. This is achieved by controlling various aspects of the extrusion process. It has also enabled the production of new processed food products and "revolutionized many conventional snack manufacturing processes".

=== Chemical changes with cooking ===
Extrusion cooking results in "chemical reactions that occur within the extruder barrel and at the die" like most other forms of cooking. Extrusion enables mass production of some food, and will "denature antinutritional factors" while destroying toxins or killing microorganisms. It may also improve protein quality and digestibility and affects the product's shape, texture, colour, and flavour. Changes associated with extrusion include:

- Destruction of certain naturally occurring toxins and antinutrients (including trypsin inhibitors, haemagglutinins, tannins and phytates)
  - All four listed antinutrients reduce the absorption of protein. Phytate and tannins also reduce the absorption of minerals.
- Reduction in the level of microorganisms in the final product.
- Partial destruction of heat-liable vitamins (A, B, C, and E).
- Moderate increase in protein digestibility, due to protein denaturation and the inactivation of antinutrients.
- Maillard reactions, which reduce the available amounts of certain amino acids, including the essential amino acid lysine. Lysine loss can be reduced by using wetter mixtures.
- Breakdown of complex carbohydrates (starches and non-starch polysaccharides) into simpler components. Part of this action is caused by amylase from the cereal themselves.
  - This increases glycemic index and creates starches more likely to cause insulin resistance. The "extrusion process significantly increased the availability of carbohydrates for digestion".
  - This may also lead to higher tooth decay.
  - On the other hand, this breakdown converts insoluble fibers into soluble fibers.
- Binding and volatization of flavor compounds.
- Gelatinization of starch.
- An increase in iron content due to the wearing of machine components. No significant change in zinc absorption.
- As of 1998, little is known about the stability or bioavailability of phytochemicals involved in extrusion. Phenols appear to be decreased.

Overall, the effects of "extrusion cooking on nutritional quality are ambiguous", as extrusion may change carbohydrates, dietary fibre, the protein and amino acid profile, vitamins, and mineral content of the extrudate in a manner that is beneficial or harmful. Nutritional quality has been found to improve with moderate conditions (short duration, high moisture, low temperature), whereas a negative effect on nutritional quality of the extrudate occurs with a high temperature (at least 200 °C), low moisture (less than 15%), or improper components in the mix. High-temperature extrusion for a short duration "minimizes losses in vitamins and amino acids".

A 2012 research paper indicates that use of non-traditional cereal flours, such as amaranth, buckwheat or millet, may be used to reduce the glycemic index of breakfast cereals produced by extrusion. The extrudate using these cereal flours exhibits a higher bulk and product density, has a similar expansion ratio, and has "a significant reduction in readily digestible carbohydrates and slowly digestible carbohydrates". A 2008 paper states that replacing 5% to 15% of the wheat flour and white flour with dietary fibre in the extrudate breakfast cereal mix significantly reduces "the rate and extent of carbohydrate hydrolysis of the extruded products", which increased the level of slowly digested carbohydrates and reduced the level of quickly digested carbohydrates.

=== Texture ===
The material of which an extrusion die is made can affect the final product. Rough bronze dies on pasta extruders produce a rougher surface than smooth stainless steel dies, considered to make more liquid pasta sauces adhere better; pasta made this way is labelled "bronze die" pasta to indicate a premium product.

Pasta dies

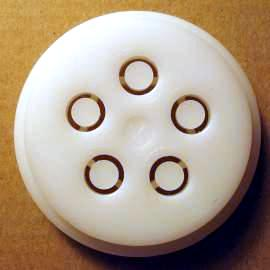
Front of a die for making elbow macaroni

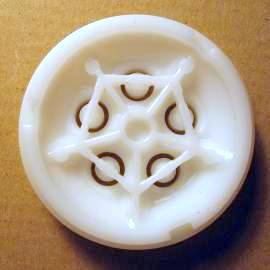
Back of the same plastic die

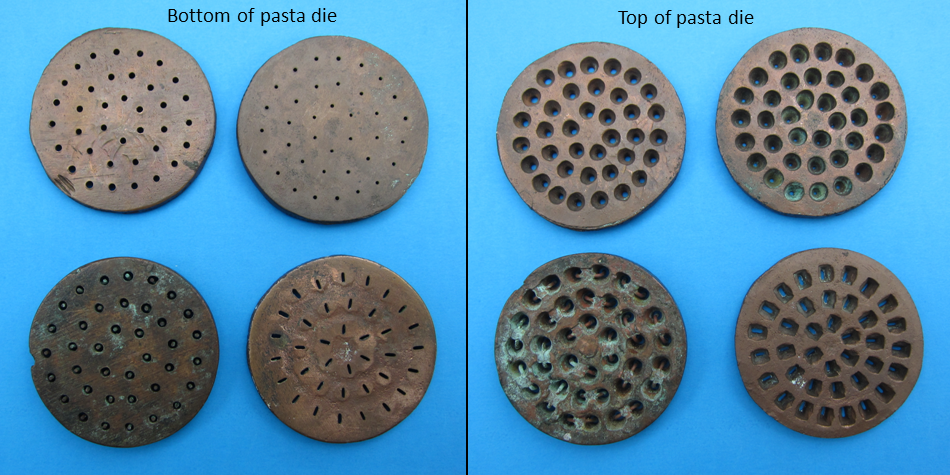
Old metal dies for pasta, showing bottom and top of the dies

== Products ==
Extrusion has enabled the production of new processed food products and "revolutionized many conventional snack manufacturing processes".

The various types of food products manufactured by extrusion typically have a high starch content. Directly expanded types include breakfast cereals and corn curls, and are made in high-temperature, low-moisture conditions under high shear. Unexpanded products include pasta, which is produced at intermediate moisture (about 40%) and low temperature. Texturized products include meat analogues, which are made using plant proteins ("textured vegetable protein") and a long die to "impart a fibrous, meat-like structure to the extrudate", and fish paste.

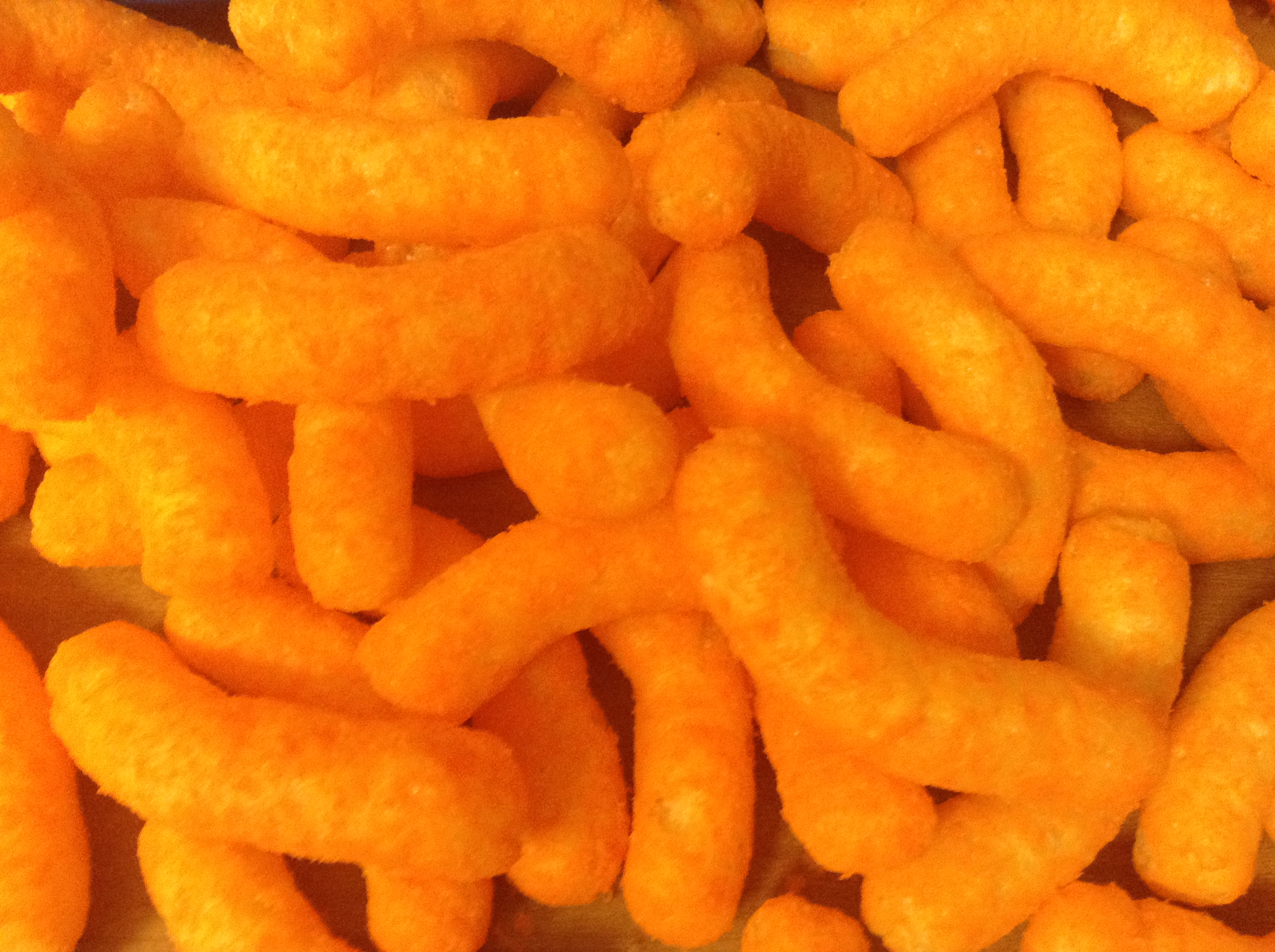
Cheese curls, a directly expanded snack food

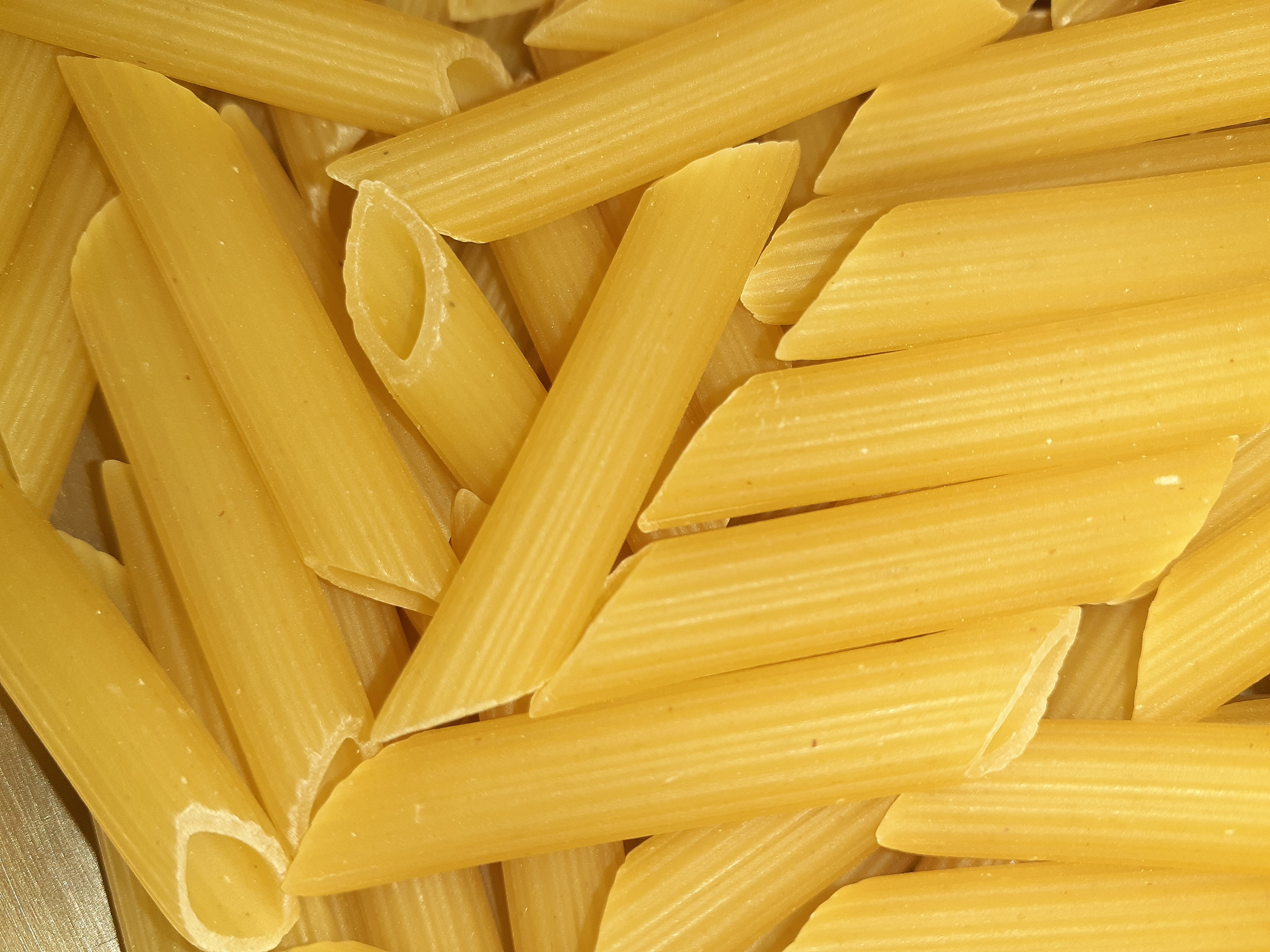
Pasta, an unexpanded food

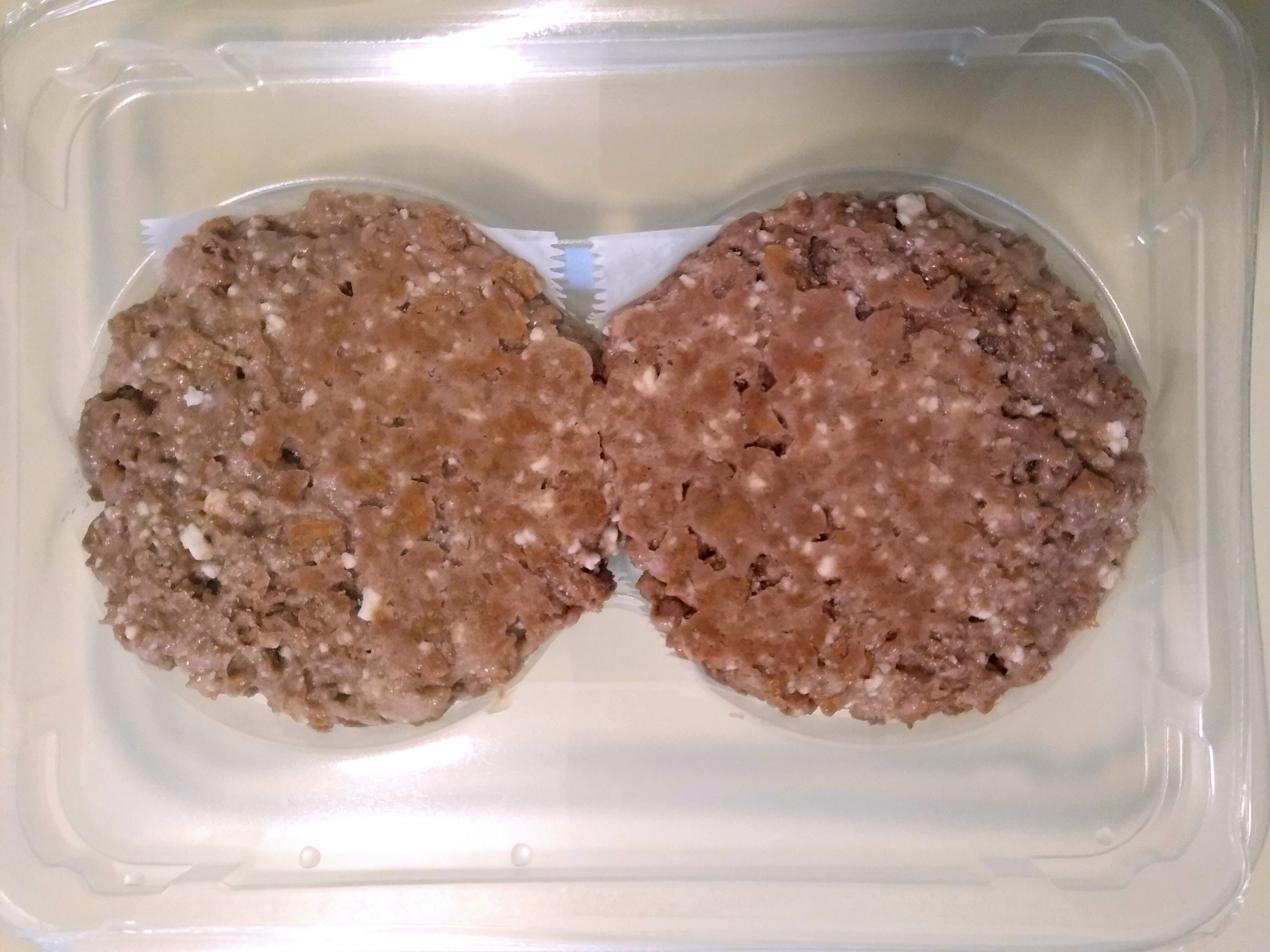
Meat alternative, a texturized food

Some processed cheeses and cheese analogues are also made by extrusion. Processed cheeses extruded with low moisture and temperature "might be better suited for manufacturing using extrusion technology" than those at high moisture or temperature. Lower moisture cheeses are firmer and chewier, and cheddar cheese with low moisture and an extrusion temperature of 80 °C was preferred by subjects in a study to other extruded cheddar cheese produced under different conditions. An extrudate mean residence time of about 100 seconds can produce "processed cheeses or cheese analogues of varying texture (spreadable to sliceable)".

Confectionery made via extrusion includes chewing gum, liquorice, and toffee. Other food products often produced by extrusion include some breads (croutons, bread sticks, and flat breads), various ready-to-eat snacks, pre-made cookie dough, some baby foods, some beverages, and dry and semi-moist pet foods. Specific examples include cheese curls, macaroni, Fig Newtons, jelly beans, sevai, and some french fries.

Extrusion is also used to modify starch and to pellet animal feed.

== See also ==
- Flash pasteurization
