= Macaroni pie =

Pasta dish

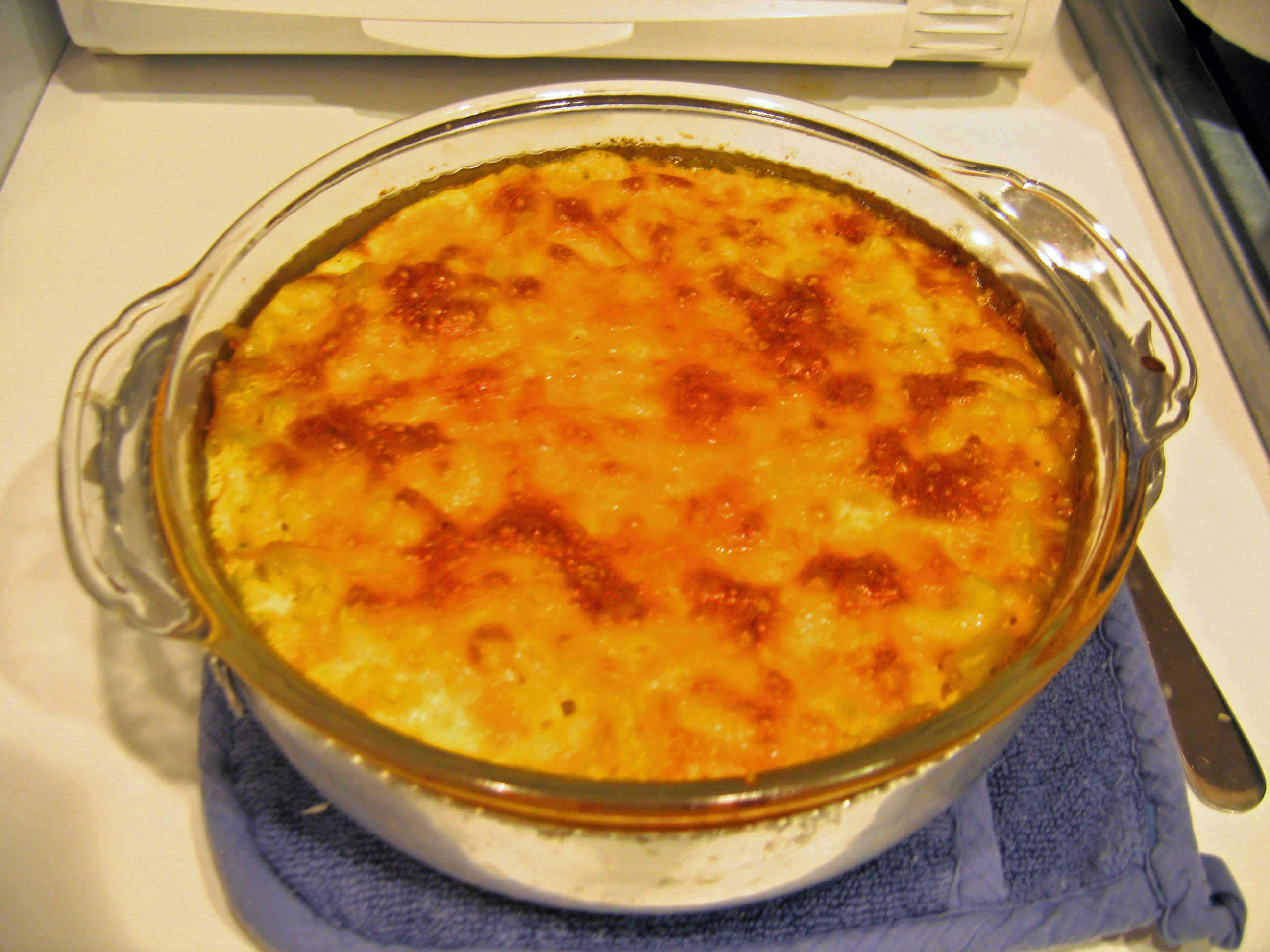
Macaroni cheese pie

Macaroni cheese pie is a pie dish based on baked macaroni and cheese. Primary ingredients may include elbow macaroni, cheese, and milk.

== Preparation ==
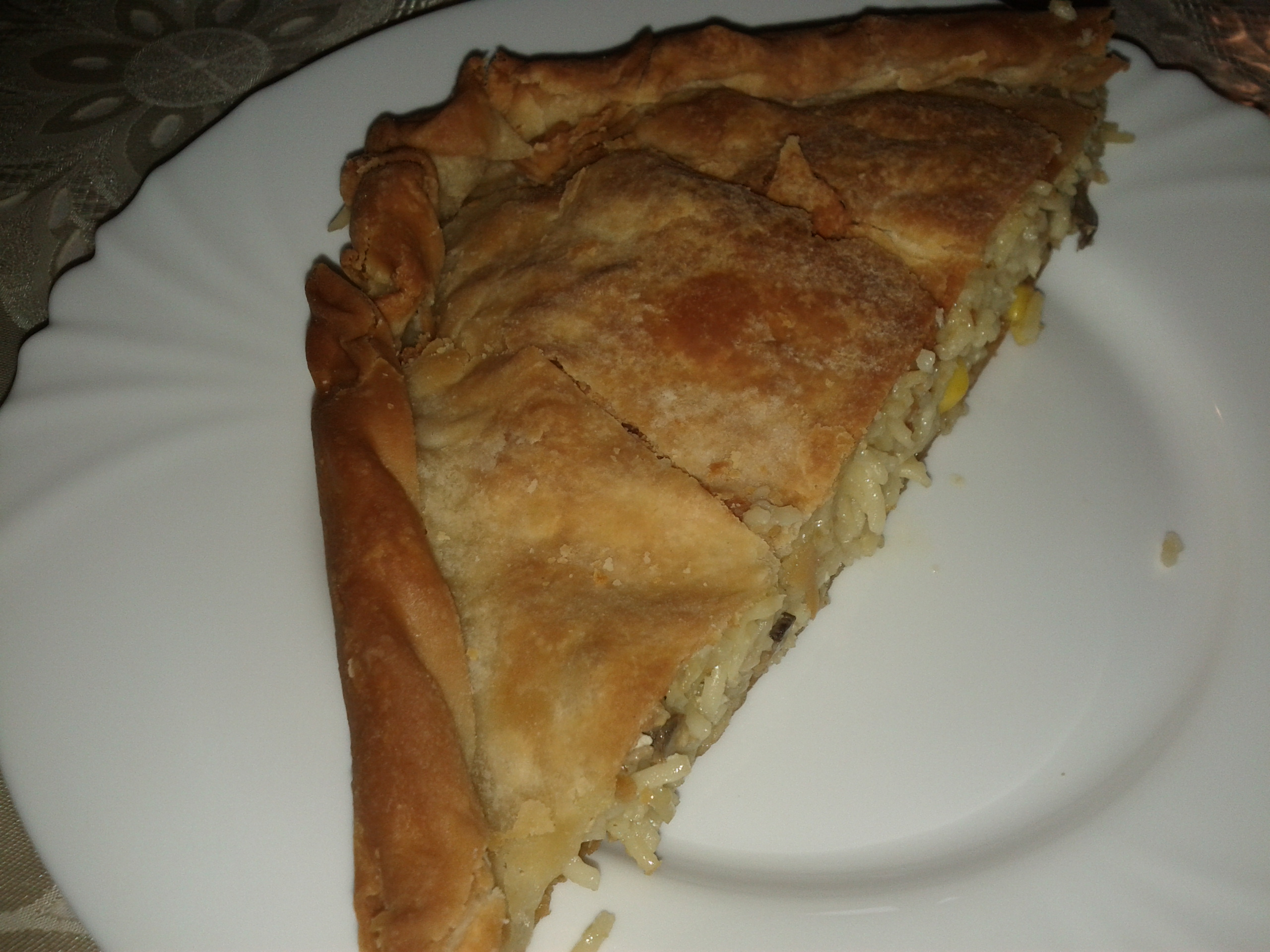
A slice of macaroni pie

Typical ingredients in macaroni pie include macaroni pasta, cheese, milk, butter, flour, salt, pepper and various spices. Additional ingredients sometimes used include onion and bread crumbs. Other ingredients may also be used. It can be prepared as a low-fat dish using reduced fat cheese and skim milk. Some versions, such as those in Scotland, are prepared using a pie crust, while others are not. It may be served sliced into wedges.

== By region ==
In the Caribbean, macaroni pie is typically prepared without using a pie crust, and may sometimes be consumed cold, which may be referred to as "Caribbean style".

=== Barbados ===
Macaroni pie is a popular dish in Barbados, where it is commonly consumed as a main or side dish along with fish or meat. It is sometimes prepared as a spicy dish, using spices such as black pepper and hot sauces.

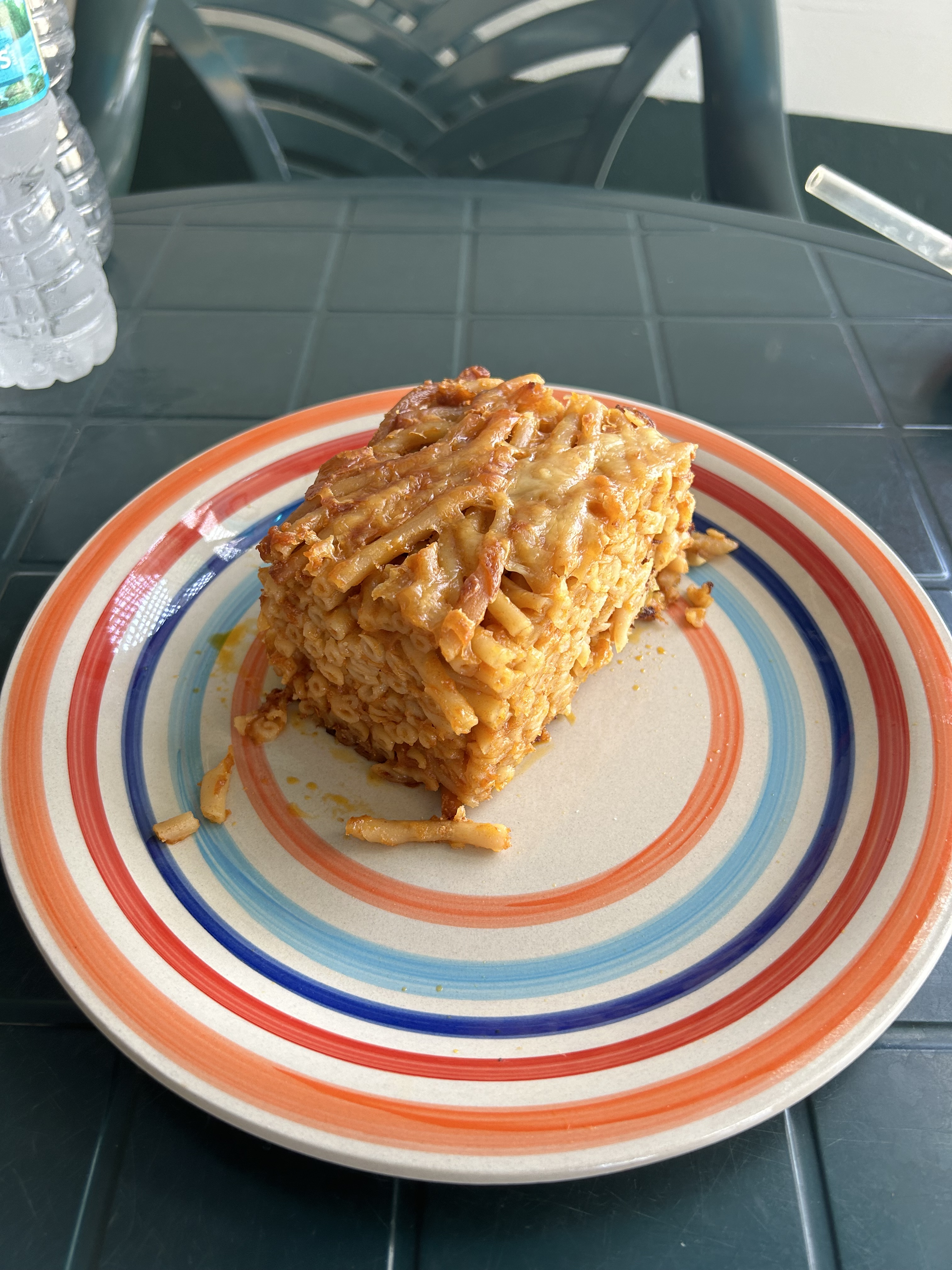
Bajan macaroni pie

=== Scotland ===
In Scotland, macaroni pie is prepared by filling a Scotch pie shell with macaroni and cheese and baking it. Greggs sold it in Scotland, but stopped doing so in June 2015, which spurred an online campaign and petition for the company to return the dish. Several prominent Scottish politicians signed the petition, including main party leaders Nicola Sturgeon, Ruth Davidson and Kezia Dugdale.

=== Trinidad and Tobago ===
Macaroni pie is very popular in Trinidad and Tobago and is often available as a common dish at lunches and dinners. It has been described as a staple food in Tobago. Cheddar cheese, a key ingredient in the dish, was brought to Trinidad by Scottish people. It is sometimes served as a side dish accompanied with stewed meats.

=== United States ===
In the United States, macaroni pie has been and sometimes still is referred to as "baked macaroni and cheese". It is a part of the cuisine of the Southern United States. In the United States during the mid-1900s, the word "spaghetti" was typically used to refer to macaroni, and spaghetti was used to prepare macaroni pie during this time period. An American recipe from 1870 includes grated ham as an ingredient in the dish, and also calls for the meat from squirrels, birds or wild ducks. An American recipe from 1892 includes pork and ham in the dish's preparation.

== Similar dishes ==
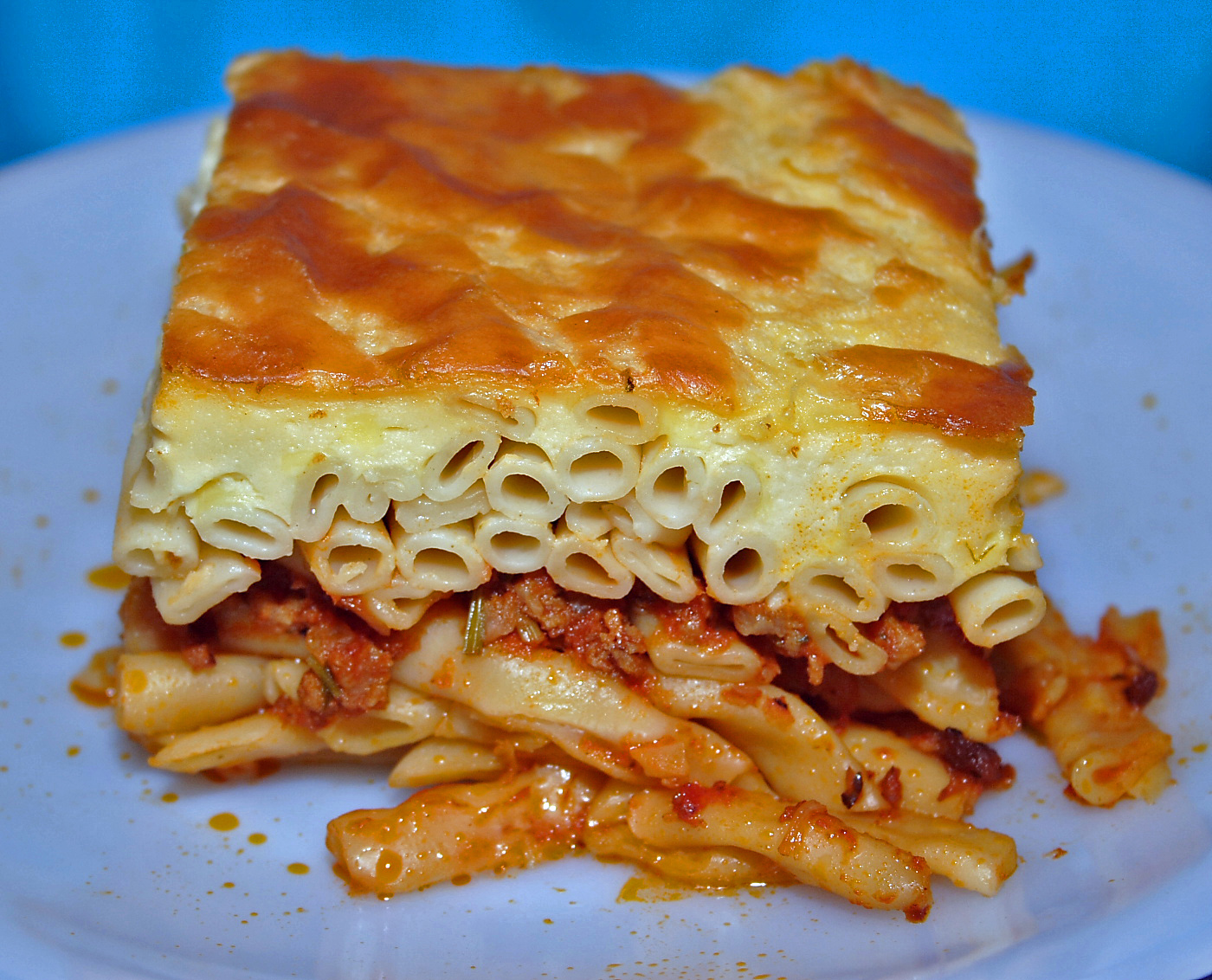
Pastitsio

The Finnish macaroni casserole or makaro(o)nilaatikko is a popular dish made with elbow pasta and egg-and-milk mixture, and baked until it sets. Often sautéed minced meat (and optionally onion) is added, thus creating a lihamakaronilaatikko (literally, meat-macaroni casserole). The casserole may be topped before baking with breadcrumbs and grated cheese and/or knobs of butter, to form a crunchy crust. Makaronilaatikko is typically served with tomato ketchup and pickles such as gherkins.

Pastitsio is a type of Meat pie in Greek cuisine prepared using elbow macaroni noodles and various additional ingredients.

In Italian cuisine, the macaroni pie (Italian: Pasticcio (or Timballo) di maccheroni) is a traditional dish in several cities, with a long tradition originating from the pastizzi prepared by the chefs active in the Italian courts of the Renaissance: the most well known, filled with pigeon meat and truffles, comes from Ferrara, while also Rome (whose pasticcio, filled with chicken innards and topped with cream, has a clear Renaissance origin) Naples and Sicily have their own version. The Sicilian Timballo has been immortalised by Luchino Visconti in his movie Il Gattopardo.

== See also ==
- List of casserole dishes
