= Curling (metalworking) =

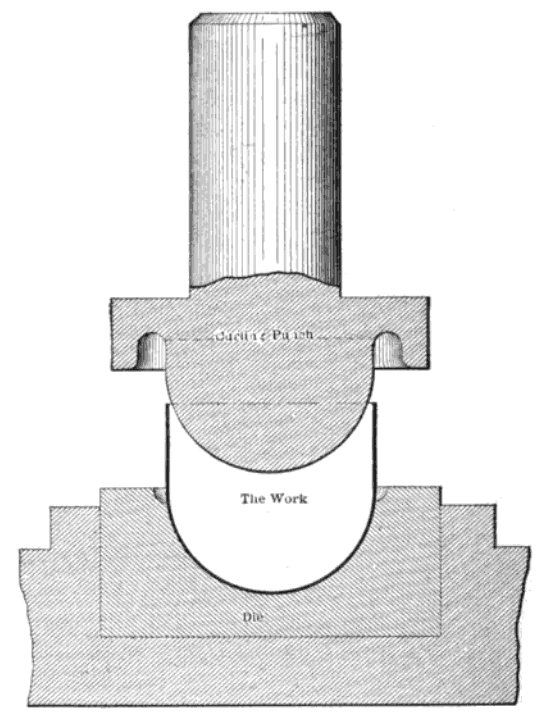
A schematic of the curling process

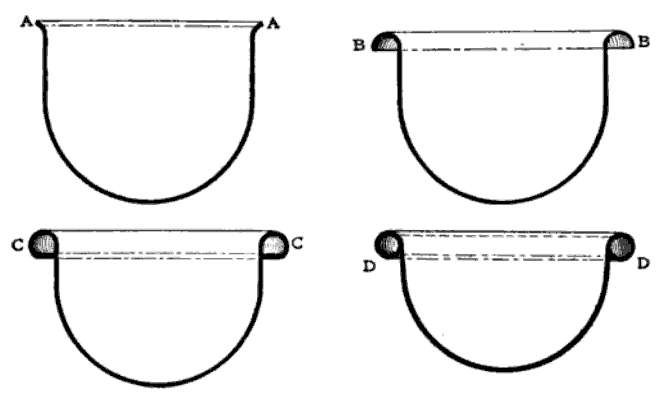
The four steps to create a full curl

Curling is a sheet metal forming process used to form the edges into a hollow ring. Curling can be performed to eliminate sharp edges and increase the moment of inertia near the curled end. Other parts are curled to perform their primary function, such as door hinges.

== Operation ==
In the curling operation, the flare, or burr, should always be turned away from the die. This will help prolong the life of the die by avoiding unnecessary damage due to scratching. The stroke of the die must be as long as the curl. Curling is often performed as part of a high production, multiple operation progressive forming.

== Tooling ==
The curling die is designed to curl a material of specific thickness. Dies are generally made of hardened tool steel because of the amount of wear caused by the operation. Their smooth, rounded cavities are often lapped and polished to help curl the material uniformly.

== See also ==
- Tailored blank
