= Dry pasta line =

Machines that make dry pasta products

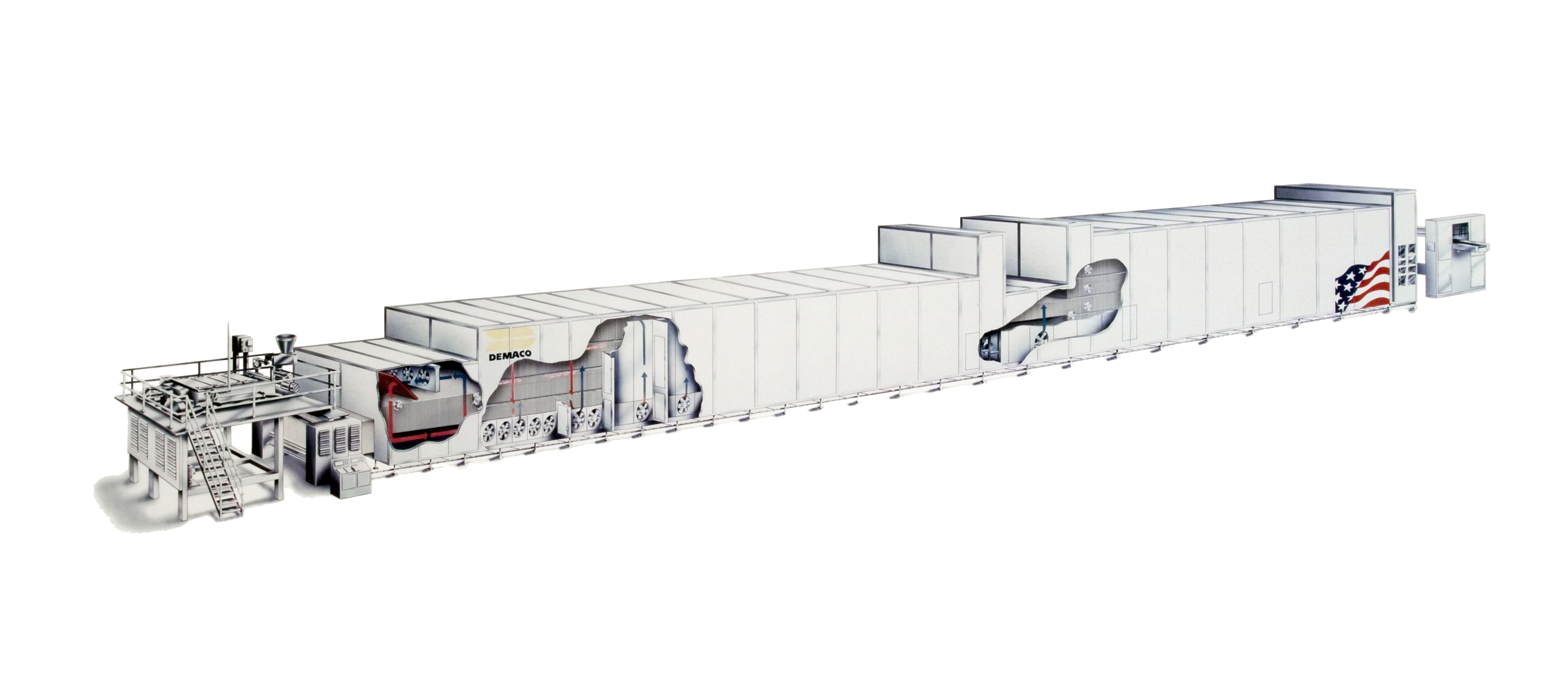
DEMACO long goods dry pasta line

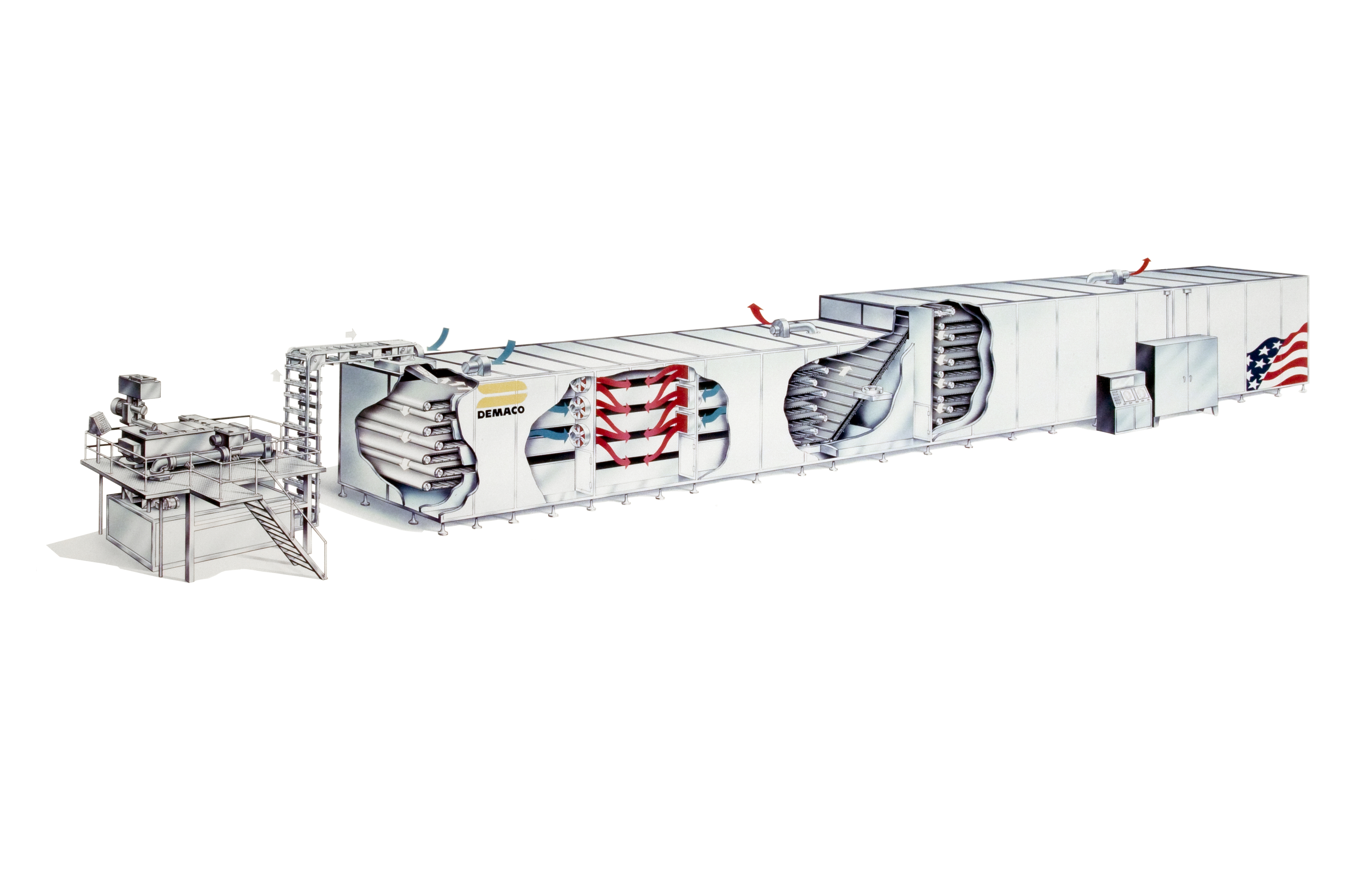
DEMACO short goods dry pasta line

Dry pasta lines are machines that make dry pasta products such as spaghetti or penne on a commercial scale, used for high-volume continuous production ranging from 500 to 8,000 kg per hour capacity. A typical dry pasta line consists of an extruder and a dryer. Modern machines are highly automated using programmable logic controllers. They are called "lines" because they contain a series of processing machines through which the dough passes. It is common for dry pasta lines to run continuously for up to six weeks, with packaging done in shifts.

== Extruder ==
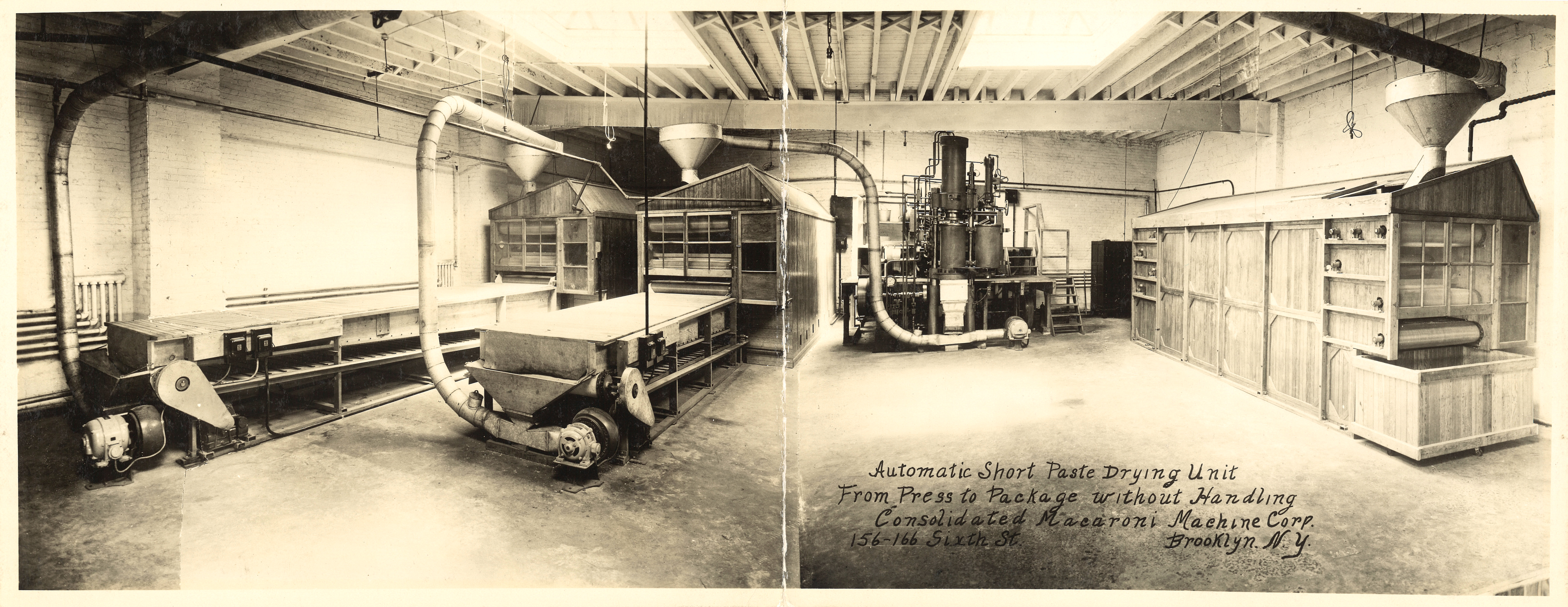
Automatic short cut dry pasta production machine built by Consolidated Macaroni Machine Corporation in the early 1930s

The extruder mixes flour and water to make dough, kneads the dough and pushes it through a die to form the shape, and cuts the pasta to the correct length. Dry pasta lines typically use rectangular dies to extrude long goods pasta and round dies to extrude short goods pasta. The extruder typically uses a vacuum system in the mixing process to keep air out of the dough.

== Dryer ==
The dryer dries the pasta to the correct moisture level, typically using sticks or screens to transport pasta inside the dryer depending on the length of the product. Long goods pasta such as spaghetti is hung vertically from sticks and short goods pasta such as penne is placed on long horizontal conveyors with mesh screen belts. Long goods pasta takes about 6-9 hours to dry depending on the temperature used in the drying process, and short goods pasta takes about 3-4 hours. Air circulation, heat and moisture control are critical factors to the pasta drying process.

== Post drying ==
Manufacturers can store and package pasta in many ways after drying. After drying is complete, long pasta is usually stored in a section of the line called the accumulator, which holds the sticks with strands of pasta until it is further processed. The sticks are conveyed to a section called the "stripper", which removes the pasta from the stick, trims the strands to the correct length, and conveys it for further processing, such as a packaging machine. Finished short cut pasta is usually held in large storage silos until it is packaged or boxed. Each shape of pasta is stored in a separate silo.

== See also ==
- Food industry
