= Football ground =

Football ground may refer to:

- A football stadium, a building or venue where association football matches are played and watched
  - A football-specific stadium, a stadium specifically for association football
  - See also Category:Association football venues
- A football pitch, the field of play
