= Die (manufacturing) =

Specialized machine tool used in manufacturing industries

A die is a specialized machine tool used in manufacturing industries to cut and/or form material to a desired shape or profile. Stamping dies are used with a press, as opposed to drawing dies (used in the manufacture of wire) and casting dies (used in molding) which are not. Like molds, dies are generally customized to the item they are used to create.

Products made with dies range from simple paper clips to complex pieces used in advanced technology. Continuous-feed laser cutting may displace the analogous die-based process in the automotive industry, among others.

== Die stamping ==
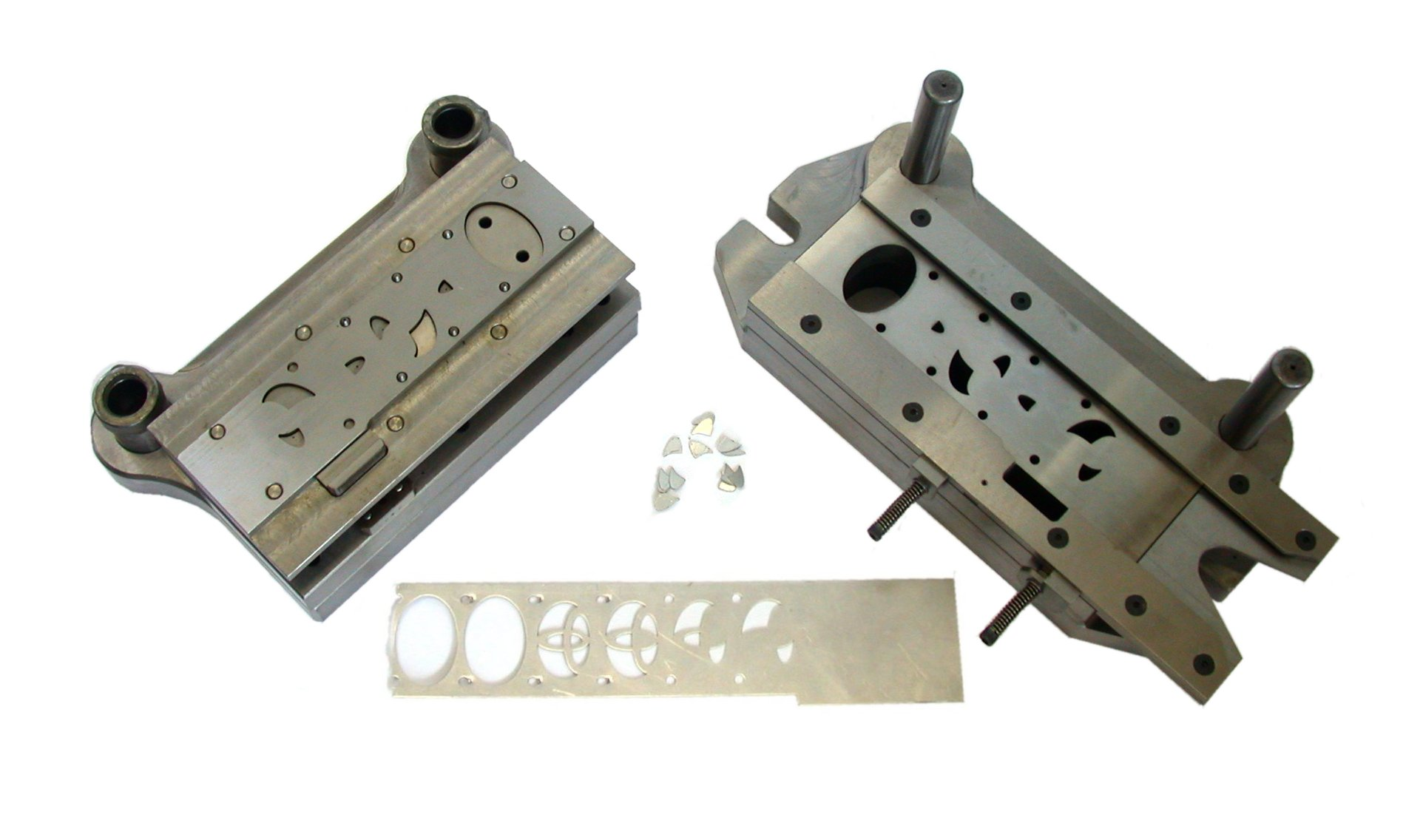
Progressive die with scrap strip and stampings. Such dies are used in progressive stamping.

Blanking and piercing are two die cutting operations, and bending is an example of a die forming operation.

=== Die forming ===
Forming operations work by deforming materials like sheet metal or plastic using force (compression, tension, or both) and rely on the material's mechanical properties. Forming dies are typically made by tool and die makers and put into production after mounting into a press.

=== Differences between materials ===
For the vacuum forming of plastic sheet only a single form is used, typically to form transparent plastic containers (called blister packs) for merchandise. Vacuum forming is considered a simple molding thermoforming process but uses the same principles as die forming.

For the forming of sheet metal, such as automobile body parts, two parts may be used: one, called the punch, performs the stretching, bending, and/or blanking operation, while another part that is called the die block securely clamps the workpiece and provides a similar stretching, bending, and/or blanking operation. The workpiece may pass through several stages using different tools or operations to obtain the final form. In the case of an automotive component, there will usually be a shearing operation after the main forming is done. Additional crimping or rolling operations may be performed to ensure that all sharp edges are hidden and/or to add rigidity to the panel.

== Die components ==
The main components of a die set (including press mounting) are as follows. Because nomenclature varies between sources, alternate names are in parentheses:

- Die shoes (holders) – the set of flat, parallel plates that serve as the foundation for mounting die components.
- Guide pins (pillars) – together with guide bushings, the pins align the die shoes precisely during each press stroke.
- Die set (plates). Placement can be inverted depending on the operation, such as use of a knock-out:
  - Die block – the lower (bottom) half of the die set. Machined to conform to the desired shape of the workpiece being formed or cut.
  - Punch plate – the upper (top) half of the die set. Holds and supports the different punches in place.
- Punch – male portion of the die which punches through the sheet metal and into the corresponding (female) section of the die block. More specifically:
  - Blanking punch – performs a dual-purpose operation where either a profiled slug, called the blank, is cut out and used for further working, or where a finished piece is cut free from the sheet metal.
  - Pierce punch – cuts a desired shape (circular, polygonal, etc.) out of the workpiece. The slug is discarded.
- Stripper plate (pad) – spring-loaded plate that separates (i.e., strips) the workpiece from the withdrawing punch after each press stroke.
- Pilot – This will help to place the sheet accurately for the next stage of operation.
- Stock guide – ensures that the material being worked on always goes in the same position, within the die, as the last one.
- Setting (stop) block – This part is used to control the depth that the punch goes into the die.
- Shank – installs the punch plate to the press. It should be aligned and situated at the center of gravity of the plate.

== Process ==
- Blanking: A blanking die produces a flat piece of material by cutting the desired shape in one operation. The finished part is referred to as a blank. Generally a blanking die may only cut the outside contour of a part, often used for parts with no internal features.
  Three benefits to die blanking are:
1. Accuracy. A properly sharpened die, with the correct amount of clearance between the punch and die, will produce a part that holds close dimensional tolerances in relationship to the part's edges.
2. Appearance. Since the part is blanked in one operation, the finish edges of the part produces a uniform appearance as opposed to varying degrees of burnishing from multiple operations.
3. Flatness. Due to the even compression of the blanking process, the result is a flat part that may retain a specific level of flatness for additional manufacturing operations.
- Broaching: The process of removing material through the use of multiple cutting teeth, with each tooth cutting behind the other. A broaching die is often used to remove material from parts that are too thick for shaving.
- Bulging: A bulging die expands the closed end of tube through the use of two types of bulging dies. Similar to the way a chef's hat bulges out at the top from the cylindrical band around the chef's head.
1. Bulging fluid dies: Uses water or oil as a vehicle to expand the part.
2. Bulging rubber dies: Uses a rubber pad or block under pressure to move the wall of a workpiece.
- Coining: is similar to forming with the main difference being that a coining die may form completely different features on either face of the blank, these features being transferred from the face of the punch or die respectively. The coining die and punch flow the metal by squeezing the blank within a confined area, instead of bending the blank. For example, an Olympic medal that was formed from a coining die may have a flat surface on the back and a raised feature on the front. If the medal was formed (or embossed), the surface on the back would be the reverse image of the front.
- Compound operations: Compound dies perform multiple operations on the part. The compound operation is the act of implementing more than one operation during the press cycle.
- Compound die: A type of die that has the die block (matrix) mounted on a punch plate with perforators in the upper die with the inner punch mounted in the lower die set. An inverted type of blanking dies that punches upwards, leaving the part sitting on the lower punch (after being shed from the upper matrix on the press return stroke) instead of blanking the part through. A compound die allows the cutting of internal and external part features on a single press stroke.
- Curling: The curling operation is used to roll the material into a curved shape. A door hinge is an example of a part created by a curling die.
- Cut off: Cut off dies are used to cut off excess material from a finished end of a part or to cut off a predetermined length of material strip for additional operations.
- Drawing: The drawing operation is very similar to the forming operation except that the drawing operation undergoes severe plastic deformation and the material of the part extends around the sides. A metal cup with a detailed feature at the bottom is an example of the difference between formed and drawn. The bottom of the cup was formed while the sides were drawn.

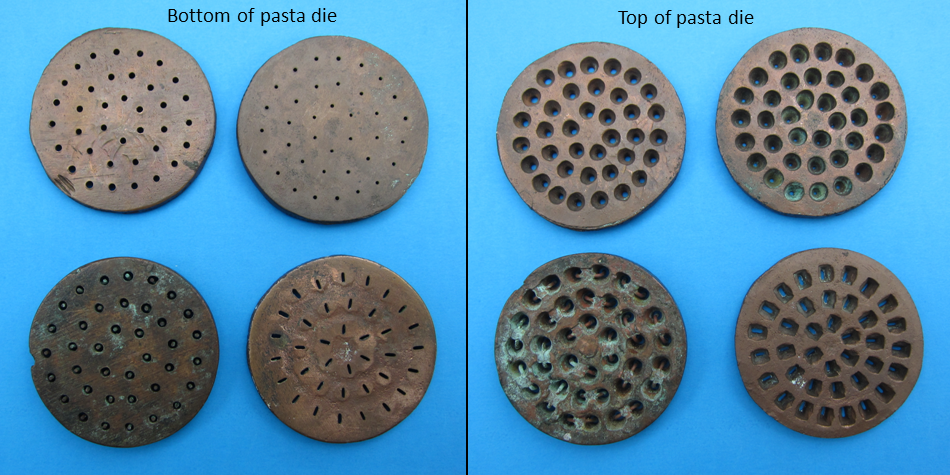
Pasta dies

- Extruding: Extruding is the act of severely deforming blanks of metal called slugs into finished parts such as an aluminum I-beam. Extrusion dies use extremely high pressure from the punch to squeeze the metal out into the desired form. The difference between cold forming and extrusion is extruded parts do not take shape of the punch. Also, dies are used in food extrusion, such as pasta processing, to form shaped products.
- Forming: Forming dies to bend the blank along a curved surface. An example of a part that has been formed would be the positive end(+) of a AA battery.
- Cold forming (cold heading): Cold forming is similar to extruding in that it squeezes the blank material but cold forming uses the punch and the die to create the desired form, extruding does not.

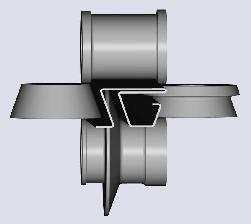
Roll Forming Stand

- Roll forming: a continuous bending operation in which sheet or strip metal is gradually formed in tandem sets of rollers until the desired cross-sectional configuration is obtained. Roll forming is ideal for producing parts with long lengths or in large quantities.
- Horning: A horning die provides an arbor or horn in which the parts are placed for secondary operations.
- Hydroforming: Forming of tubular part from simpler tubes with high water pressure.
- Pancake die: A Pancake die is a simple type of manufacturing die that performs blanking and/or piercing. While many dies perform complex procedures simultaneously, a pancake die may only perform one simple procedure with the finished product being removed by hand.
- Piercing: The piercing operation is used to pierce holes in stampings.
- Transfer die: Transfer dies provide different stations for operations to be performed. A common practice is to move the material through the die so it is progressively modified at each station until the final operation ejects a finished part.
- Progressive die: The sheet metal is fed through as a coil strip, and a different operation (such as punching, blanking, and notching) is performed at the same station of the machine with each stroke of a series of punches.
- Punching:
- Shaving: The shaving operation removes a small amount of material from the edges of the part to improve the edges finish or part accuracy. (Compare to Trimming).
- Side cam die: Side cams transform vertical motion from the press ram into horizontal or angular motion.
- Sub press operation: Sub-press dies blank and/or form small watch, clock, and instrument parts.
- Swaging: Swaging (necking) is the process of "necking down" a feature on a part. Swaging is the opposite of bulging as it reduces the size of the part. The end of a shell casing that captures the bullet is an example of swaging.
- Trimming: Trimming dies cut away excess or unwanted irregular features from a part, they are usually the last operation performed.
- Pillar set: Pillar set are used for alignment of dies in press movement.

== Steel-rule die ==
Steel-rule die, also known as cookie cutter dies, are used for cutting sheet metal and softer materials, such as plastics, wood, cork, felt, fabrics, and paperboard. The cutting surface of the die is the edge of hardened steel strips, known as steel rule. These steel rules are usually located using saw or laser-cut grooves in plywood. The mating die can be a flat piece of hardwood or steel, a male shape that matches the workpiece profile, or it can have a matching groove that allows the rule to nest into. Rubber strips are wedged in with the steel rule to act as the stripper plate; the rubber compresses on the down-stroke and on the up-stroke it pushes the workpiece out of the die. The main advantage of steel-rule dies is the low cost to make them, as compared to solid dies; however, they are not as robust as solid dies, so they are usually only used for short production runs. In printing and packaging, steel-rule dies are widely used to die-cut paperboard and card stock. They are also used, along with rotary dies, to crease paperboard in converting lines to make unique shapes for products such as presentation folders, packaging, and cards.

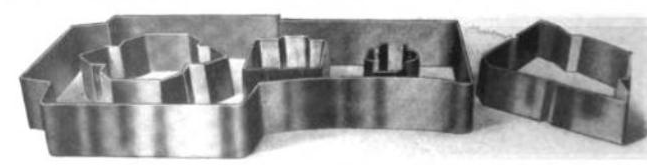
A steel-rule die

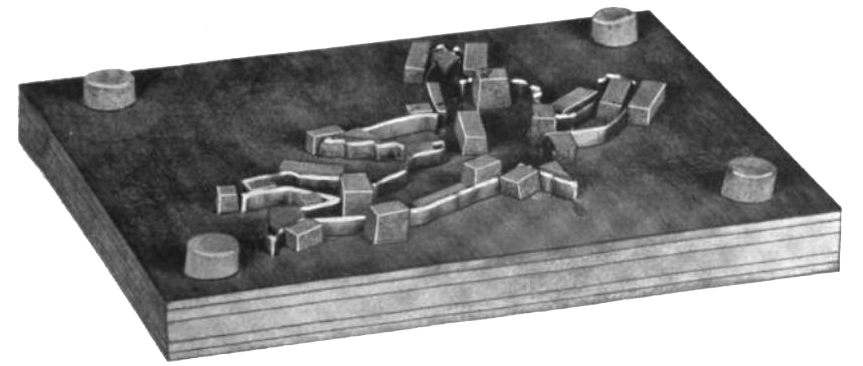
A steel-rule die

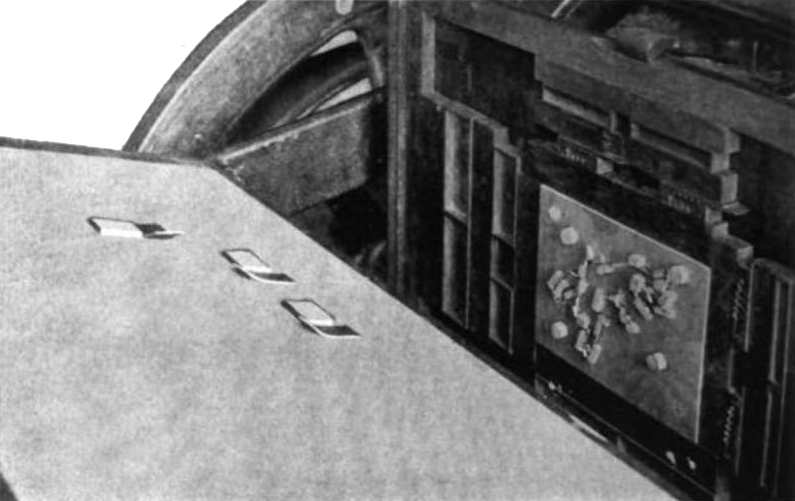
Steel-rule die in a press

== Rotary die ==
In the broadest sense, a rotary die is a cylindrical shaped die that may be used in any manufacturing field. However, it most commonly refers to cylindrical shaped dies used to process soft materials, such as paper or cardboard. Two rules are used, cutting and creasing rules. This is for corrugated boards whose thickness is more than 2 mm. Rotary dies are faster than flat dies.

The term also refers to dies used in the roll forming process.

== Wire pulling ==
Wire-making dies have a hole through the middle of them. A wire or rod of steel, copper, other metals, or alloy enters into one side and is lubricated and reduced in size. The leading tip of the wire is usually pointed in the process. The tip of the wire is then guided into the die and rolled onto a block on the opposite side. The block provides the power to pull the wire through the die.

The die is divided into several different sections. First is an entrance angle that guides the wire into the die. Next is the approach angle, which brings the wire to the nib, which facilitates the reduction. Next is the bearing and the back relief. Lubrication is added at the entrance angle. The lube can be in powdered soap form. If the lubricant is soap, the friction of the drawing of wire heats the soap to liquid form and coats the wire. The wire should never actually come in contact with the die. A thin coat of lubricant should prevent the metal to metal contact.

For pulling a substantial rod down to a fine wire a series of several dies is used to obtain progressive reduction of diameter in stages.

Standard wire gauges used to refer to the number of dies through which the wire had been pulled. Thus, a higher-numbered wire gauge meant a thinner wire. Typical telephone wires were 22-gauge, while main power cables might be 3- or 4-gauge.
