= List of casserole dishes =

Notable dishes cooked in casseroles

This is a list of notable casserole dishes. A casserole, probably from the archaic French word casse meaning a small saucepan, is a large, deep dish used both in the oven and as a serving vessel. The word is also used for the food cooked and served in such a vessel, with the cookware itself called a casserole dish or casserole pan.

== Casserole dishes ==
Name	Image	Origin	Description and notable ingredients
American goulash		United States	Ground beef and pasta, usually macaroni or egg noodles, cooked in tomato sauce
Bacalhau à Gomes de Sá		Portugal (Porto)	Bacalhau (dried salted cod) poached in milk and then cooked with olive oil, garlic, and onion, and served with black olives, parsley, and boiled eggs
Bacalhau à Zé do Pipo		Portugal (Porto)	Bacalhau that is poached in milk and then layered with onions, mashed potatoes, and mayonnaise, and garnished with olives or bell peppers
Bacalhau com natas		Portugal	Bacalhau layered with onions, diced fried potatoes, and double cream, usually seasoned with nutmeg and white pepper before being baked
Baeckeoffe		Alsace, France	Cubed mutton, beef, and pork which have been marinated in Alsatian white wine and juniper berries and slow-cooked with sliced potatoes and onions in a ceramic casserole sealed with bread dough. Leeks, thyme, parsley, garlic, carrots and marjoram may also be added.
Cassoulet		France (Castelnaudary)	Haricot beans cooked with a variety of meats and sausages, especially pork, mutton and confit game birds, garlic, and herbs
Chicken Divan		United States (New York City, New York)	Poached chicken breasts and broccoli served in a Mornay sauce enriched with egg yolks
Chili mac		United States (Midwest)	A combination of chili con carne and macaroni, typically served with cheese either on top or mixed in
Confit byaldi		France, United States	A variation on traditional ratatouille, a rustic French vegetable stew. Even and thinly sliced rounds of zucchini, yellow squash, Japanese eggplant, and roma tomatoes are shingled on a piperade and slowly cooked to steam the vegetables under parchment paper before the parchment is removed and the vegetables are allowed to roast. It may be garnished with a balsamic vinaigrette.
Doria		Japan	Cooked white rice that is topped with béchamel sauce and cheese and baked. There are many variations incorporating different meats, vegetables, and spices.
Fërgesë		Albania	A vegetable and cheese casserole made from peppers, tomatoes, onions, garlic and Albanian curd cheese), slowly cooked in olive oil and baked into a clay bowl.
Fish head casserole		China	A simple dish using fish heads that are cooked with aromatics and vegetables
Flying Jacob/ flygande Jacob		Sweden	A chicken casserole invented for a potluck using leftovers, including whipping cream, chili sauce, bananas, roasted peanuts, bacon and Italian salad seasoning.
Frito pie		United States	A layered casserole composed of chili con carne topped with corn chips (traditionally Fritos) and cheese and baked. It may also be topped with salsa, refried beans, sour cream, onion, rice, or jalapeños before or after baking.
Funeral potatoes		United States	Potatoes (commonly hashbrowns or cubed potatoes) bound together with cream of mushroom or cream of chicken soup, cheese, onions, and sour cream and topped with a crispy starch such as corn flakes, crushed crackers, or potato chips.
Gopchang-jeongol		Korea	Gopchang (chitterlings of cows or pigs) and beef simmered in beef broth with onions, scallions, mushrooms and other vegetables, and aromatics like garlic, and ginger.
Gratin dauphinois		France	Thinly sliced potatoes cooked in cream
Green bean casserole		United States	Green beans and cream of mushroom soup, topped with fried onions. It is popularly served on Thanksgiving.
Hotdish		United States (Upper Midwest)	Ground meat and canned or frozen vegetables mixed with canned soup, typically cream of mushroom soup and topped with a starch such as tater tots, crushed potato chips, or crushed crackers.
Imelletty perunalaatikko		Finland (Päijät-Häme)	A sweetened potato casserole traditionally made by mixing pureed potatoes with a small amount of wheat flour and left to rest for several hours; the amylase in the flour breaks down the starch molecules into smaller sugars. The potatoes are then mixed with milk and baked until the top of the dish is caramelized.
Janssons frestelse		Sweden	Julienned potatoes topped with layers of onion and pickled sprats, baked in cream. It is popularly eaten at Christmas and Easter.
Jeongol		Korea	Sliced beef or seafood, vegetables, mushrooms, and other seasonings, boiled with a small amount of broth
Johnny Marzetti		United States (Midwest)	Extruded pasta (such as macaroni or fusilli), ground beef, and vegetables cooked in tomato sauce and topped with cheese before being baked in an oven
Kaalilaatikko		Finland	Cabbage, ground meat, and a grain such as rice or barley, seasoned with herbs and a small amount of syrup or molasses, and baked. It is often served with lingonberry jam.
Karnıyarık		Turkey	Eggplant stuffed with a mixture of sautéed onions, garlic, tomatoes, parsley, ground meat, and sometimes green bell pepper before being roasted or fried. It is often served with rice.
Kiampong		Philippines	Pork and Chinese sausages cooked similarly to Philippine adobo with garlic, soy sauce, vinegar, sugar, and ground black pepper. Vegetables like mustard greens and taro can also be added. The mixture is added to a pot with glutinous rice and mixed thoroughly before cooking the rice. It is garnished with toasted nuts and scallions.
King Ranch Chicken		United States	Corn tortillas or tortilla chips layered in the bottom of a casserole dish, and then covered in a mixture of chopped or shredded cooked chicken, canned tomatoes and green chiles (such as Ro-Tel), cream of mushroom and cream of chicken soup, and topped with shredded cheese before baking.
Krupenik		Russia	Groats and tvorog (a farmer's cheese) mixed together and baked
Kugel		Jewish diaspora	Either a sweet or savory casserole based on egg noodles (lokshen) or shredded potato bound together with egg. Sweet kugels may include cinnamon and/or raisins, while savory versions use vegetables or cheese.
Kugelis			
Lancashire hotpot		England (Lancashire)	Lamb (although traditionally mutton) mixed with onion and topped with slices of potato before being braised in stock or water.
Lanttulaatikko		Finland	Boiled and mashed rutabega that is sweetened and enriched with bread crumbs, egg, cream, treacle, butter, and seasoned with salt and various spices such as ginger, cinnamon and nutmeg before being baked.
Lasagna		Italy	Layers of wide, thin pasta that are alternated with various fillings and sauces, such as ragù, béchamel sauce, mornay, vegetables, and cheeses s such as mozzarella, Parmesan, and ricotta, before being baked in an oven.
Macaroni and cheese		England, United States, Canada	Macaroni (or a similarly sized extruded pasta) coated in a creamy cheese sauce and baked. Cheddar is commonly used, but other sharply flavored cheese may be included. It may also be topped with bread crumbs for added texture.
Macaroni casserole		Northern Europe	Macaron pasta that is mixed with eggs, milk, and various meats, vegetables, and cheeses before being baked. Sometimes bread crumbs are added to the top before baking, and it is eaten with ketchup.
Maksalaatikko		Finland	Rice and ground liver are mixed with butter and egg and seasoned with syrup, onion, and raisins. It is traditionally served with lingonberry jam.
Maqluba		Levant	A variety of pilaf consisting of layers of rice, chicken, lamb, or fish, fried vegetables like cauliflower, and eggplant, cooked in a pot and then turned over onto a serving platter. It is typically served with fresh parsley and pine nuts.
Mirza ghassemi		Iran (Gilan)	Eggplant combined with tomato, garlic, butter or oil, and bound together with eggs before being baked. It is often served with rice or bread.
Moussaka		Balkans; Middle East	A layered casserole containing eggplant or potato and ground meat. Many regional variations exist; Greek moussaka uses eggplant and ground lamb and is topped with béchamel sauce, other Balkan countries use potato and ground beef or pork and top moussaka with a yogurt-based sauce, and Levantine moussaka is usually flavored with tomatoes.
Nut loaf		United States	A combination of one or many different nuts, legumes, and grains or breadcrumbs bound together and baked in a casserole dish or loaf pan as vegetarian or vegan alternative to traditional meat roasts.
Oysters Bienville		United States (New Orleans)	Oysters in a shrimp sauce flavored with mushrooms, bell peppers, sherry, a butter roux, Parmesan cheese, topped with bread crumbs and baked.
Panackelty		Northern England	Corned beef or lamb baked all day in a low oven along with root vegetables such as potatoes, onions, and carrots.
Pasta al forno		Italy	Short extruded pasta covered with béchamel sauce, tomato sauce, and cheese, and baked in an oven
Pastelón		Dominican Republic; Puerto Rico	Plantains or another starchy vegetable that mashed or sliced before being layered with ground meat, often picadillo, and cheese.
Pastitsada		Greece (Corfu)	Veal, beef or poultry cooked in tomatoes, white wine, olive oil, vinegar, onions, garlic, and flavored with black pepper, cloves, bay leaf, and cinnamon. It is typically served over pasta and topped with kefalotyri or Parmesan cheese.
Pastitsio		Greece (Ionian Islands)	Pasta mixed with ground beef, sometimes spiced, and béchamel sauce
Pâté aux pommes de terre		France (Centre-Val de Loire, Limousin, Allier)	Slices of potato mixed with crème fraîche and baked into a puff pastry crust. Other ingredients vary by region and may include onions, garlic, parsley, and meat.
Pâté chinois		Canada (Quebec)	Ground beef and sometimes diced onion layered with canned corn (either whole kernel or creamed) and topped with mashed potatoes
Porkkanalaatikko			
Potato babka		Belarus	Grated potatoes combined with eggs, onions, and pieces of smoked, boiled or fried bacon and sausage
Potatoes au gratin			
Rakott krumpli		Hungary	Potatoes, sour cream, smoked sausage, and hard-boiled eggs layered together
Shepherd's pie			
Shrimp DeJonghe		United States (Chicago, Illinois)	Whole peeled shrimp covered in fresh breadcrumbs flavored with garlic and sherry
Strata		United States	Layer of bread, eggs, and cheese that are baked. Various meats and vegetables may also be layered into the dish.
Sweet potato casserole		United States	Mashed sweet potatoes topped with brown sugar, nuts, and marshmallows and baked, usually until the marshmallows are browned. It is a common side dish at Thanksgiving.
Tamal de olla		Panama	A variation of tamale that is in essence the ingredients of a tamale that are not wrapped in a banana or plantain leaf, consisting of chicken or pork in corn-stuffed cornmeal, onion, tomato, bell pepper, olives, and raisins.
Tamale pie		United States (Southwest)	A casserole dish is lined with masa dough, as in a tamale, and filled with meats, stews, or leftovers and sometimes beans, salsa, or tomatoes before being sealed with more masa dough and baked.
Tepsi baytinijan		Iraq	Sliced and fried eggplant and meatballs mixed with tomatoes, onion, and garlic, topped with sliced potatoes and baked
Tetrazzini		United States	Diced poultry (such as chicken or turkey) or seafood in a cheese sauce made with butter, cream, or milk that is then flavored with sherry or white wine. Some recipes use a béchamel sauce, mornay sauce or condensed cream soup as the base. It is served combined with or over pasta, sometimes topped with breadcrumbs or cheese, and garnished with parsley or basil.
Timballo		Italy	Pasta, rice or potatoes, with one or more other ingredients including cheese, meat, fish, vegetables or fruit
Tuna casserole		Worldwide	Tuna (usually canned) mixed with rice or noodles in a creamy sauce and baked. Regional variations may include vegetables as well as a crunchy topping.
Undhiyu		India (Surat, Gujarat)	A winter vegetable cooked underground in earthen pots. Vegetables may include green beans or new peas, unripe banana, eggplant, muthia, potatoes, and purple yam, and sometimes plantain flavored with a dry curry paste
Veal Orloff		France	Thinly sliced braised loin of veal layered with duxelles and soubise, topped with Mornay sauce, and browned in the oven.
Zucchini slice		Australia; New Zealand	Shredded zucchini, sometimes with bacon and onions, bound together with a batter of egg and flour before being baked

== See also ==
- Baking
- Dutch oven – may be called casserole dishes in English speaking countries other than the United States
- Lists of prepared foods
- Marmite (cooking dish) – a traditional crockery casserole dish found in France
- Potluck – an event that sometimes includes casserole dishes
