= Chicken Divan =

Chicken casserole

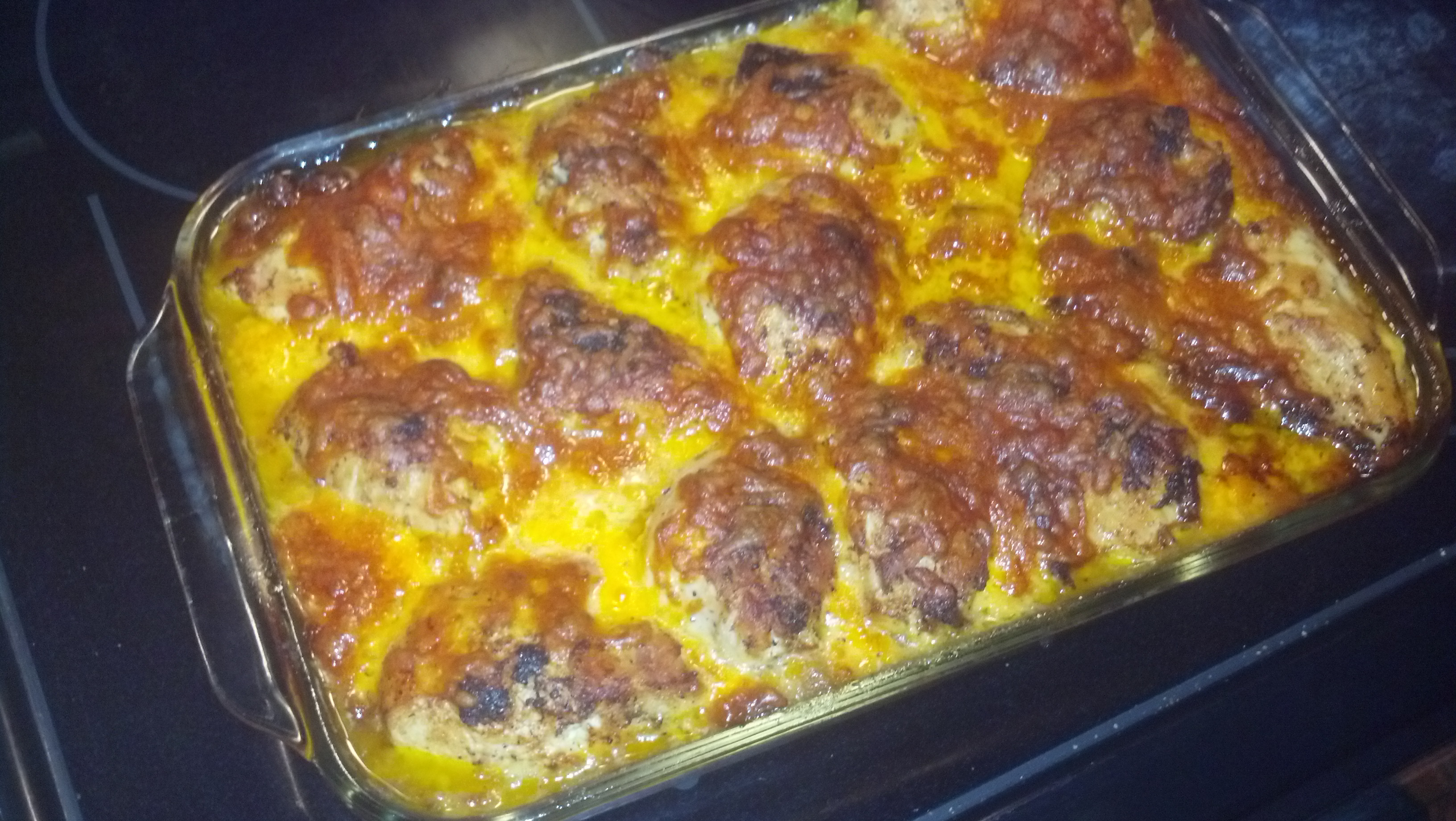
Chicken Divan

Chicken Divan is a chicken casserole usually served with broccoli and Mornay sauce. It was named after the place of its invention, the Divan Parisien Restaurant at Chatham Hotel in New York City where it was served as the signature dish in the early twentieth century. Its creator was a chef named Lagasi. In French, the word divan refers to a meeting place or great hall.

== History ==
There are many historic recipes for Chicken Divan found in cookbooks dating to the late 1950s and early 1960s, but their authenticity is uncertain since the original recipe was kept a secret. An approximation based on hints from the maître d'hôtel of the Divan Parisien is made with poached chicken breasts, broccoli and a cheesy béchamel, or Mornay sauce, enriched with egg yolks.

== Types of divan ==
The dish is now commonly prepared with regular Parmesan cheese and remains one of the most classic American casserole dishes today. A "quick" version can be made atop rice with pre-cooked chicken breasts, prepared mayonnaise and canned soup such as Cream of Chicken or Cream of Mushroom. Some versions are topped with potato chips, in a manner similar to that of funeral potatoes.

== See also ==
- List of casserole dishes
- List of regional dishes of the United States
- Chicken and broccoli
