= Krupnik (disambiguation) =

Krupnik is an East European honey liqueur.

Krupnik may also refer to:

- Kishka (food), East European sausage regionally known as krupnik or krupniok
- Krupnik (soup), Polish barley soup
- Krupnik, Blagoevgrad Province, village in Bulgaria
- Anastasia Krupnik, the protagonist from the children's book series by Lois Lowry
- Leo Krupnik (born 1979), American-Israeli soccer player and coach

== See also ==
- Anastasia Krupnik, children's book by Lois Lowry
- Krupenik, Russian casserole of groats and cheese
