= Panackelty =

Beef casserole dish from North East England

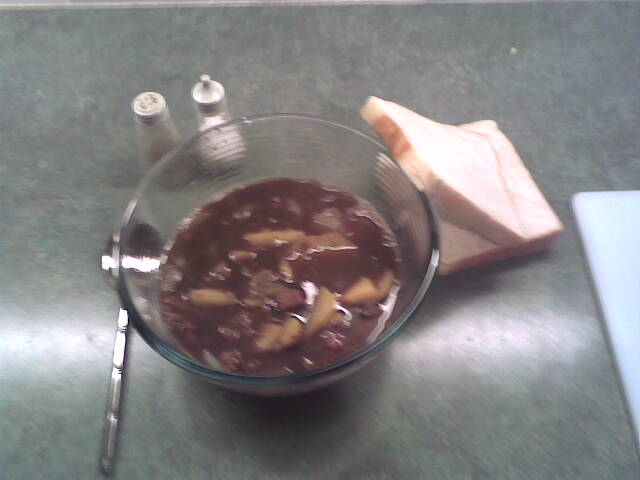
- A bowl of panackelty
- Alternative names: Panacalty
- Type: Casserole
- Region or state: Northern England
- Main ingredients: Meat and root vegetables

Panackelty (also spelt panacalty, panaculty, panackerty, panaggie, panack or panackalty) is a beef or lamb casserole traditional throughout the North of England, with links to Sunderland and the wider County Durham, such as Hartlepool. It consists of meat, mainly corned beef, and root vegetables, mainly potatoes, onions and carrots, all left to bake throughout the day in an oven pot on low heat, or cooked slowly on a low heat in a pan. The dish exists in a number of local variations that differ in name, meat and vegetable content. This dish is also referred to as tatey pot or corned beef and tatey pot.

In Sunderland the dish is made from leftover meat cooked slowly with leftover root vegetables. If short of ingredients from the night before, one would usually add more fresh root vegetables, a tin of corned beef and sliced potatoes on top. The dish is also sometimes cooked in a frying pan, or made in a large pan and served as a soup, which allows it to be left on the hob and later reheated.

Around the Humber estuary a version is known as pan aggie and consists of layers of bacon, corned beef and onions topped with either sliced or mashed potatoes.

The Northumberland version, pan haggerty, comprises potatoes, onions and cheese baked in a baking dish.

== See also ==
- List of casserole dishes
