= Gratin =

Cooking technique of creating a browned crust

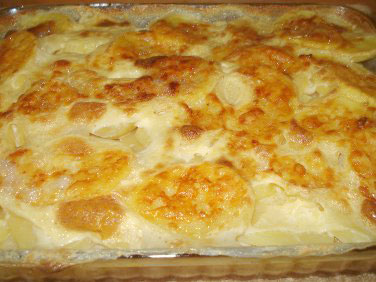
Gratin dauphinois

Gratin (French: [ɡʁatɛ̃]) is a culinary technique in which a dish is topped with a browned crust, often using breadcrumbs, cheese, or egg. The term may be applied to any dish made using this method. Gratin is usually prepared in a shallow dish. A gratin is baked or cooked under an overhead grill or broiler to form a golden crust on top, and it is often served in its baking dish.

Popular potato-based gratins are referred to by a variety of names including scalloped potatoes, potatoes au gratin (or au gratin potatoes), and potato bake. The name "old rotten potatoes" is sometimes used humorously.

A gratin dish is a shallow oven-proof container that is commonly used to prepare gratins and similar dishes.

== Terminology ==
The etymology of gratin is from the French language word gratter, meaning "to scrape" (from having to scrape the food out of the dish it was cooked in). The technique predates the current name, which did not appear in English until 1846 (OED, s.v. "gratin").

In addition to the well-known potato dishes such as gratin dauphinois, gratin may be applied to many other bases of meat, fish, vegetables, or pasta.

== Preparations ==
Many gratinéed dishes are topped with béchamel, mornay or other sauces.

=== Potato-based ===
==== Potatoes gratiné ====
Potatoes gratiné is one of the most common gratins and is known by various names, including “gratin potatoes” and gratin de pommes de terre. Slices of boiled potato are put in a buttered fireproof dish, sprinkled with cheese, and browned in the oven. Sliced raw potatoes may also be baked in a liquid or sauce that steams them and forms a golden crust on top. In the US, the dish is referred to variously as funeral potatoes, potatoes au gratin, scalloped potatoes, or au gratin potatoes. In English-speaking Canada, it is called scalloped potatoes or potatoes au gratin. In French-speaking Canada, the dish is referred to as patates au gratin. In Australia, it is known as potato bake, and New Zealanders refer to it as scalloped potatoes, potato scallops, or potato cake. In North America, traditionally, au gratin potatoes included cheese and scalloped potatoes did not, but this differentiation has been lost to time.

==== Pommes de terre gratinées ====
To make pommes de terre gratinées, or "potatoes with cheese," according to the recipe of Marcel Boulestin, large floury potatoes are baked in the oven, then halved and the flesh scooped from the skins. The flesh is mashed with butter, cream, grated cheese, and seasoning(s). The mix is then scooped back into the skins, arranged in a baking dish, sprinkled with grated cheese, and browned in the oven or under the grill. This preparation is also called "twice-baked potatoes".

==== Gratin dauphinois ====
Gratin dauphinois is a speciality of the Dauphiné region of France. The dish is typically made with thinly sliced and layered potatoes, and cream, cooked in a buttered dish rubbed with garlic. Some recipes add cheese and eggs.

==== Gratin savoyard ====
Gratin savoyard is a similar dish found in the adjacent Savoie department. It consists of alternating layers of sliced potatoes, Beaufort cheese, and pieces of butter, with bouillon as the liquid. Cream is not used.

==== Funeral potatoes ====
Funeral potatoes is a similar dish consisting of hash browns or cubed potatoes, cheese (cheddar or Parmesan), onions, cream soup (chicken, mushroom, or celery) or a cream sauce, sour cream, and a topping of butter with corn flakes or crushed crackers or potato chips. The dish has been associated with members of the Church of Jesus Christ of Latter-day Saints because of its popularity among members of the church.

=== Other preparations ===
==== Pasta ====
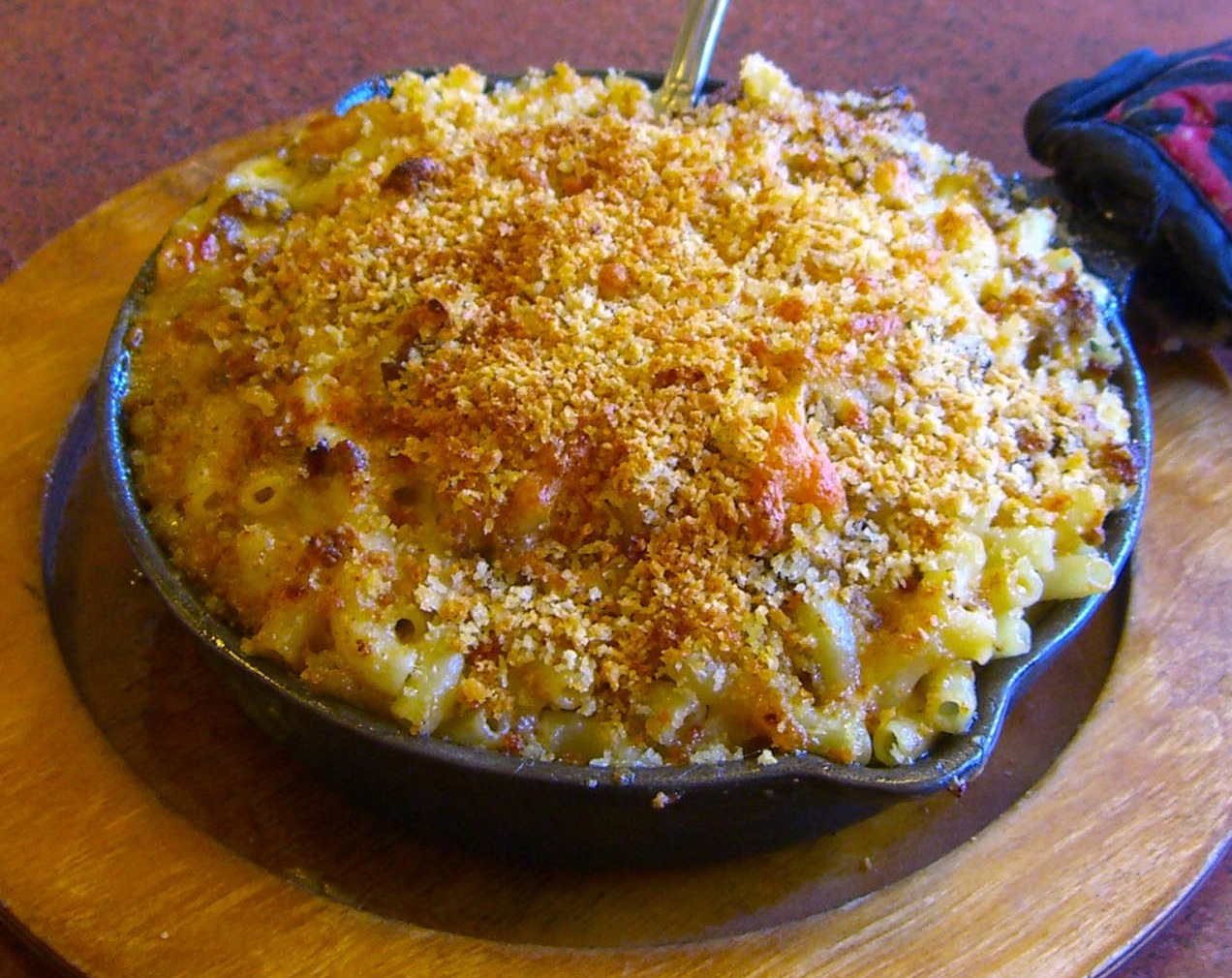
A macaroni, cheese and meat gratin.

The Neapolitan dish pasta al gratin (also referred to as "pasta au gratin" in American English) may be made with various kinds of pasta, including penne, rigatoni, fusilli, macaroni, or tagliatelle. The pasta is cooked al dente, then covered with béchamel sauce, cheese (typically a mixture including scamorza, mozzarella or parmesan) and breadcrumbs, then baked.

==== Seafood ====
Sole au gratin is a sole gratin, often covered with mushrooms. Many fish-based gratins use a white gratin sauce and cheese, and brown quickly. Cozze gratinate is a mussel-based recipe found in Italy.

Janssons frestelse ("Jansson's temptation") is a Swedish gratin of potatoes, onions, and preserved fish, somewhat similar to a French dish of potatoes with anchovies.

Cod au gratin is a classic Newfoundland comfort food dish of cod baked in a creamy sauce and topped with cheese.

==== Vegetable ====
Gratin Languedocien is made with eggplant and tomato, covered in breadcrumbs and oil, then browned. This dish is similar to the Italian dish known as melanzane alla parmigiana (eggplant parmesan). Other vegetables commonly used in gratin dishes include cauliflower, spinach, and butternut squash.

== See also ==
- List of casserole dishes
- List of potato dishes
