= Krupenik =

Russian casserole dish

- Type: Casserole
- Course: Main dish or dessert
- Place of origin: Russia
- Serving temperature: Hot or cold
- Main ingredients: Groats, farmer cheese

A krupenik (Russian: крупеник) is a sweet or savory casserole made of groats (wheat, buckwheat, barley or rice) and tvorog, or Russian farmer cheese. It is a dish that is typical of Russian cuisine.

== See also ==
- List of casserole dishes
- List of Russian dishes

== Sources ==
- Bratusheva, A., ed. (2014). Russkaya kukhnya v multivarke (Русская кухня в мультиварке) [Russian Cuisine in a Multicooker] (in Russian). Moskva: Eksmo. p. 37.
- Сладкий крупеник из гречки / Sweet krupenik from buckwheat (rus.)
