= Cod au gratin =

Canadian dish

Cod au gratin is a Canadian dish originating in Newfoundland, consisting of cod fish baked in a creamy sauce, topped with cheese.

== History ==
Cod has been a staple in Newfoundland ever since early settlers arrived on the island in the 1700s. It is believed that the dish was originally cooked with breadcrumbs, but when a hotel in St. John's ran out of bread, they substituted cheese instead, which became popular instantly. The gratin comes from the French influence, with 'au gratin' meaning to brown a dish, referring to the cheese crust that forms on the top of the dish when cooked. The dish evolved to have a creamy white sauce, known as béchamel, on top, traditionally served in a casserole tin.

== Ingredients ==
A traditional cod au gratin contains filleted cod, shredded cheese, milk, onions, and bread crumbs, with seasonings including salt, pepper, dill, dijon mustard, or lemon depending on the version. The fish is placed at the bottom of the dish, with the béchamel sauce or milk sauce with shredded cheese poured on top, with added spices and seasonings.
