= King Ranch chicken =

Tex-Mex casserole

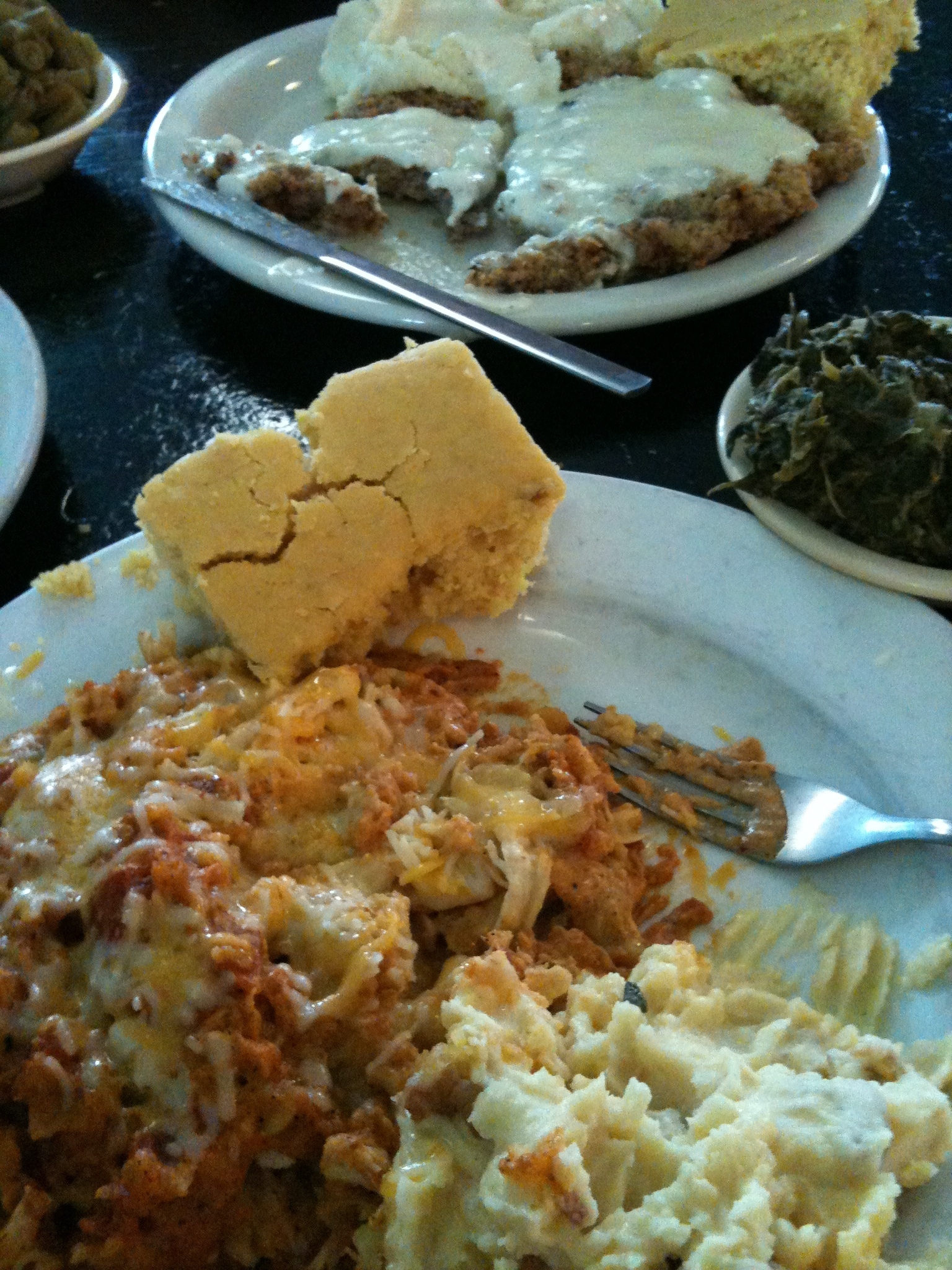
- King Ranch chicken casserole served with cornbread and mashed potatoes
- Type: Casserole
- Place of origin: Texas
- Associated cuisine: Tex-Mex

King Ranch chicken is a Tex-Mex casserole made with shredded chicken, canned soup, canned tomatoes with chiles, cheese, and tortillas.

== History ==
The name of the dish comes from King Ranch in Texas, one of the largest ranches in the United States, although the recipe's origin is unknown and it has no known direct connection to the ranch. It is thought to have developed after World War II when casseroles made out of canned food became popular. It bears similarities to chilaquiles, a Mexican dish that contains shredded chicken, cheese, tortillas, tomatoes, and chiles.

King Ranch Chicken was popular in women's clubs in South Texas and West Texas during the 1950s. The dish is often served in lunchrooms and at gatherings like funerals, church suppers, and potlucks. Frozen versions are sold in regional supermarket chains like H-E-B and Randalls.

== Description ==
The recipe generally calls for simmering a combination of canned diced tomatoes with green chiles, canned cream of mushroom soup and cream of chicken soup, diced bell peppers, diced onions, and shredded chicken. Leftover roasted or grilled chicken is often used for this recipe. Corn tortillas or tortilla chips are layered in the bottom of a casserole dish, and then covered by the chicken and canned mixture. The casserole is topped with shredded cheese before baking. The Ro-Tel brand of canned tomatoes with chiles are commonly used in recipes.

== See also ==
- List of casserole dishes
- List of chicken dishes
