= Tetrazzini =

Creamy casserole dish

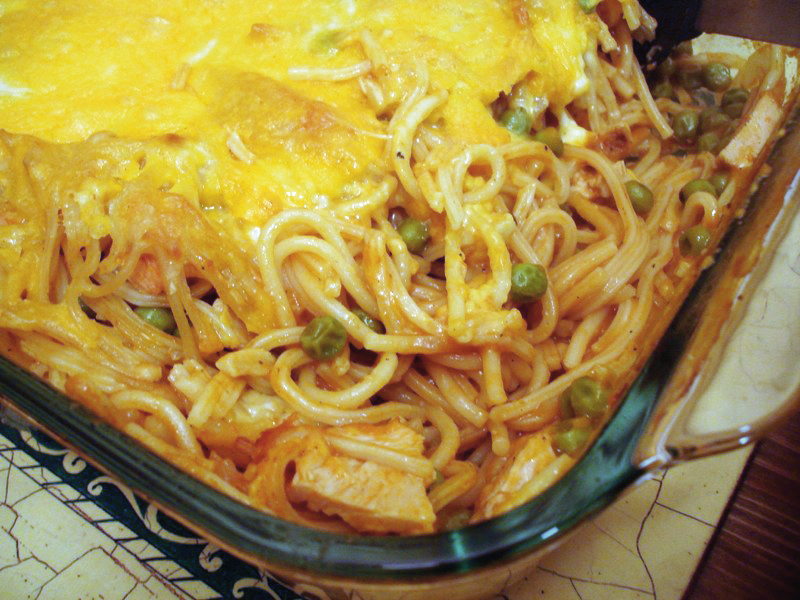
- Turkey tetrazzini
- Place of origin: United States
- Main ingredients: Poultry; seafood; butter; cream

Tetrazzini is an Italian-American dish made with diced poultry or seafood in a butter, cream, or milk and cheese sauce flavored with sherry or white wine. Some recipes use a bechamel sauce, mornay sauce, or condensed cream soup. It is combined with or served over linguine, spaghetti, egg noodles, or other types of pasta, sometimes topped with breadcrumbs or cheese, and garnished with parsley or basil.

== History ==
The dish is named after the Italian opera star Luisa Tetrazzini. The origins of tetrazzini are widely disputed. Some accounts ascribe tetrazzini to being a creation of Auguste Escoffier. Other sources claim tetrazzini was invented in the early 1900s by Ernest Arbogast, the chef at the Palace Hotel in San Francisco where Tetrazzini made her American debut at the Tivoli as Gilda in Rigoletto on January 11, 1905. However, other sources attribute the origin to the Knickerbocker Hotel in Midtown Manhattan, New York.

From the 1950s through the 1980s, upscale New York City restaurants, including Mamma Leone's and Sardi's, featured tetrazzini on the menu. Sardi's tetrazzini recipe was featured in Vincent Price's cookbook A Treasury of Great Recipes and was mentioned in the Sue Kaufman novel Diary of a Mad Housewife. Tetrazzini frozen dinners were popular in the 1960s, as noted by Joan Didion in The Saturday Evening Post article "The Big Rock Candy Figgy Pudding Pitfall". Recipes for tetrazzini, both from scratch and using convenience ingredients, were popular in the 1950s and 1960s, and the dish was featured in an episode of the period TV drama Mad Men. The Unofficial Mad Men Cookbook offers a collection of vintage recipes for dishes cited in the TV series, drawn from various popular mid-century restaurants and cookbooks, including a tetrazzini recipe originally published in Betty Crocker's Hostess Cookbook.

In the 1960s southern restaurants and Junior League cookbooks began featuring versions of tetrazzini (referred to as chicken spaghetti in certain parts of the American South). It was during this time when the Piccadilly cafeteria in Baton Rouge introduced chicken tetrazzini to their menu, and it remains a customer favorite in the 2020s. Foster's Market in Durham, North Carolina, introduced chicken spaghetti to their in-house dining and catering menus in the 1980s, with their version based on the recipe in the Baton Rouge Junior League cookbook River Road Recipes. By the 1990s tetrazzini and chicken spaghetti emerged as soul food classics.

Tetrazzini, specifically chicken tetrazzini, became an Internet meme after a woman on Maury accused her friend of seducing her boyfriend by preparing his favorite meal, chicken tetrazzini. Clips from the episode were featured on the E! channel show The Soup in 2007. In 2020 Vice magazine food editor Farideh Sadeghin prepared chicken tetrazzini for their Munchies series, referencing the Maury episode as her inspiration for the dish.

== See also ==
- List of casserole dishes
- List of foods named after people
- List of foods of the Southern United States
- List of soul foods and dishes
