= Baeckeoffe =

Traditional Alsatian casserole dish

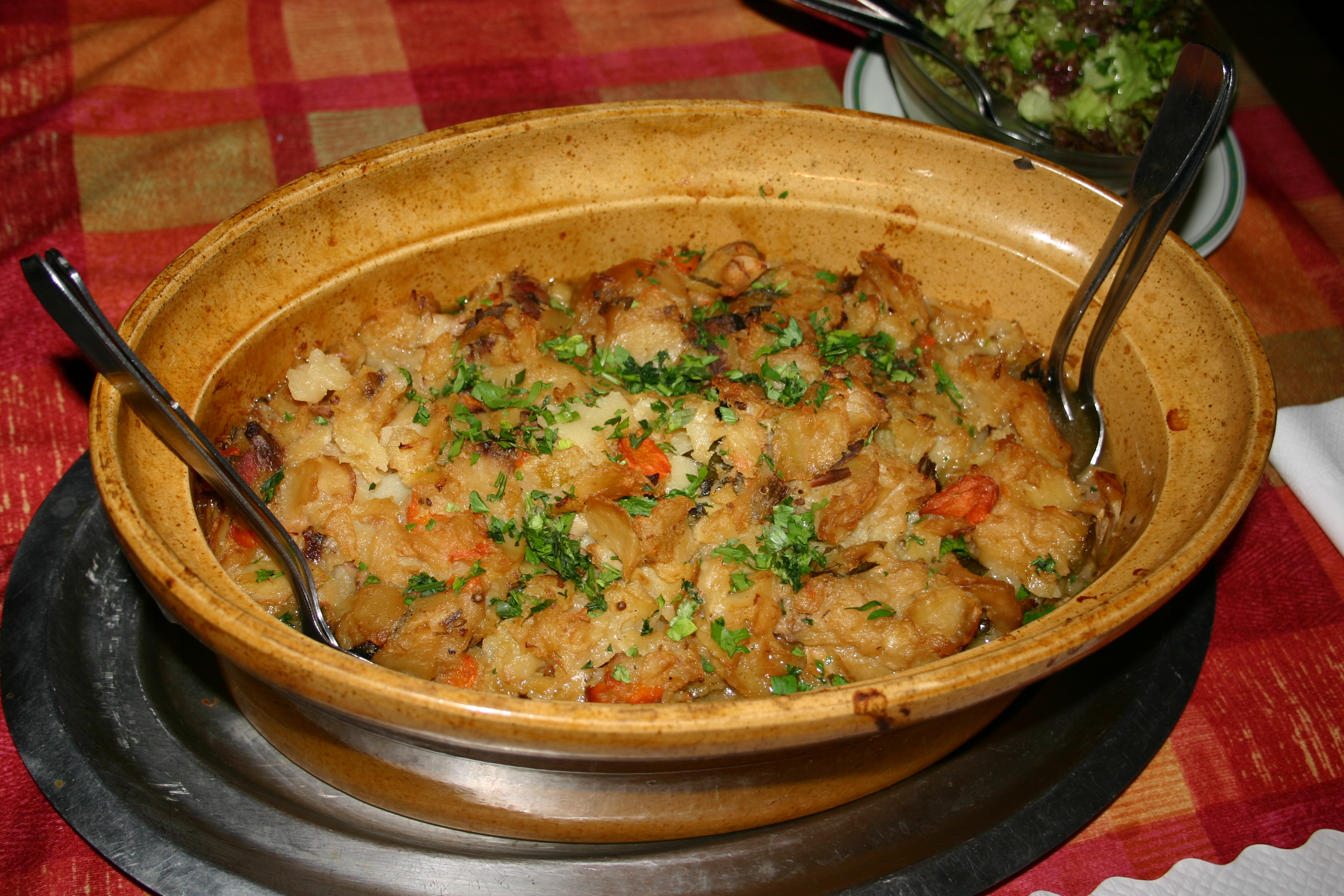
- Place of origin: France
- Region or state: Alsace
- Main ingredients: Potatoes, onions, mutton, beef, pork, Alsatian white wine, juniper berries

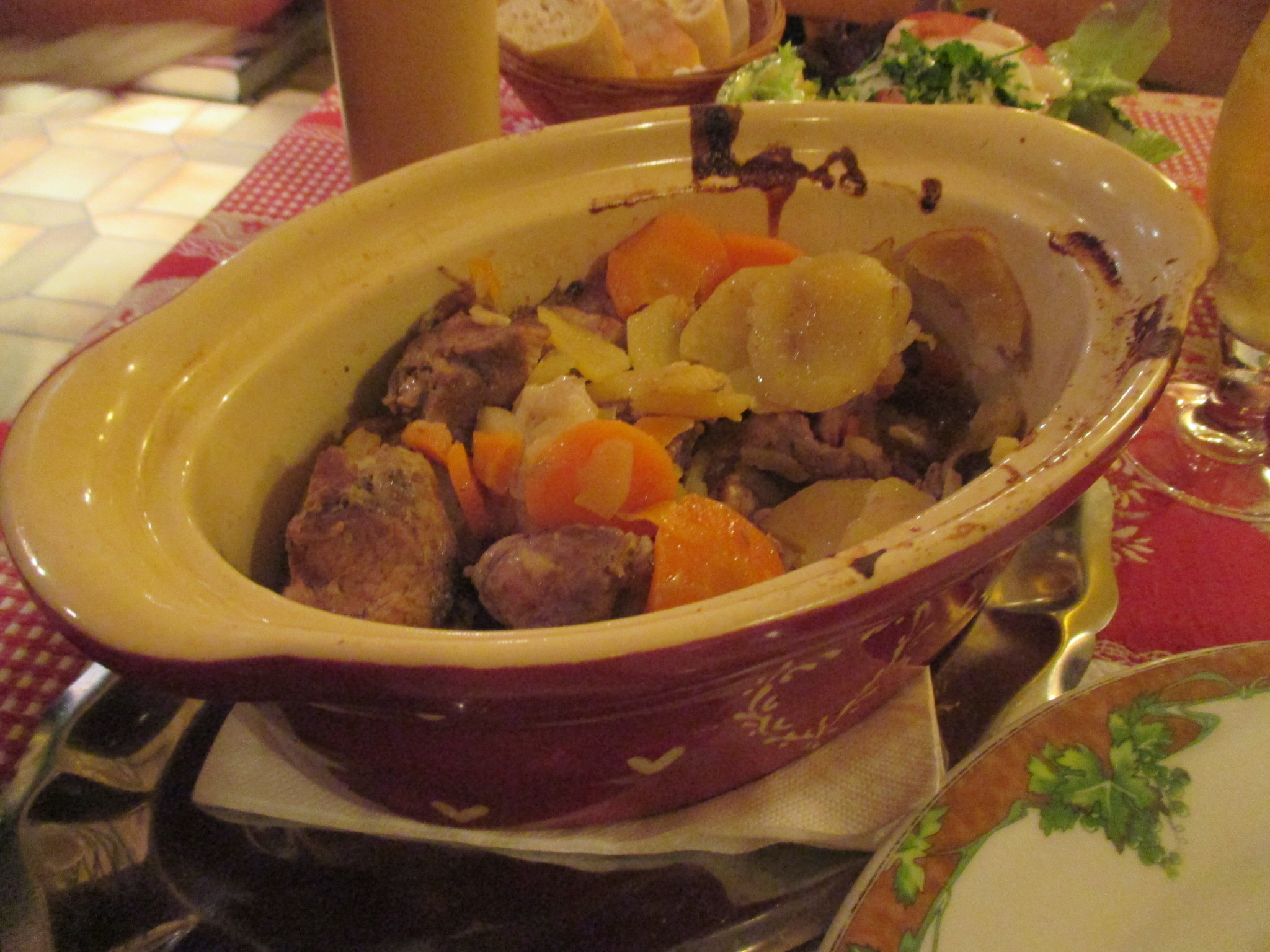
Another view of a baeckeoffe

Baeckeoffe (English: "baker’s oven") is a casserole dish that is typical in the French region of Alsace, situated on the border with Germany.

In the Alsatian dialect, Baeckeoffe means "baker's oven". It is a mix of sliced potatoes, sliced onions, cubed mutton, beef, and pork which have been marinated overnight in Alsatian white wine and juniper berries and slow-cooked in a bread-dough sealed ceramic casserole dish. Leeks, thyme, parsley, garlic, carrots and marjoram are other commonly added ingredients for flavour and colour.

Alsatian people often eat this dish for a special occasion, such as Christmas.

== History ==
The Baeckeoffe is a dish inspired by cholent, a traditional Jewish Shabbat dish. Because of the spiritual prohibition of using the fire from Friday night to Saturday night, the Jews had to prepare food for Saturday on Friday afternoon and then give the dish to the baker, who would keep it warm in his oven until Saturday noon.

Traditionally, the women would prepare this dish on Saturday evening and leave it with the baker to cook in his gradually cooling oven on Sunday while they attended the lengthy Lutheran church services once typical of the culture. The baker would take a "rope" of dough and line the rim of a large, heavy ceramic casserole, then place the lid upon it for an extremely tight seal. This kept the moisture in the container. On the way back from church, the women would pick up their casserole and a loaf of bread. This provided a meal for the Alsatians, who respected the strict Lutheran rules of the Sabbath. Part of the ritual is breaking the crust formed by the rope of dough.

Another version of the story of the origin of this dish is that women in Alsace would do laundry on Mondays and thus not have time to cook. They would drop the pots off at the baker on Monday morning and do the laundry. When the children returned home from school they would then pick up the pot at the baker and carry it home with them. This version of the story may be closer to reality as bakers were often closed on Sundays.

== See also ==
- List of casserole dishes
- List of meat dishes
- List of meat and potato dishes
