= Timpano =

Timpano may refer to:

- The Italian, Spanish and Portuguese words for eardrum
- The singular of timpani
- Timballo, an Italian baked pasta dish
- Jacob Timpano, Australian association football defender
