= Fërgesë =

Albanian vegetable and cheese casserole

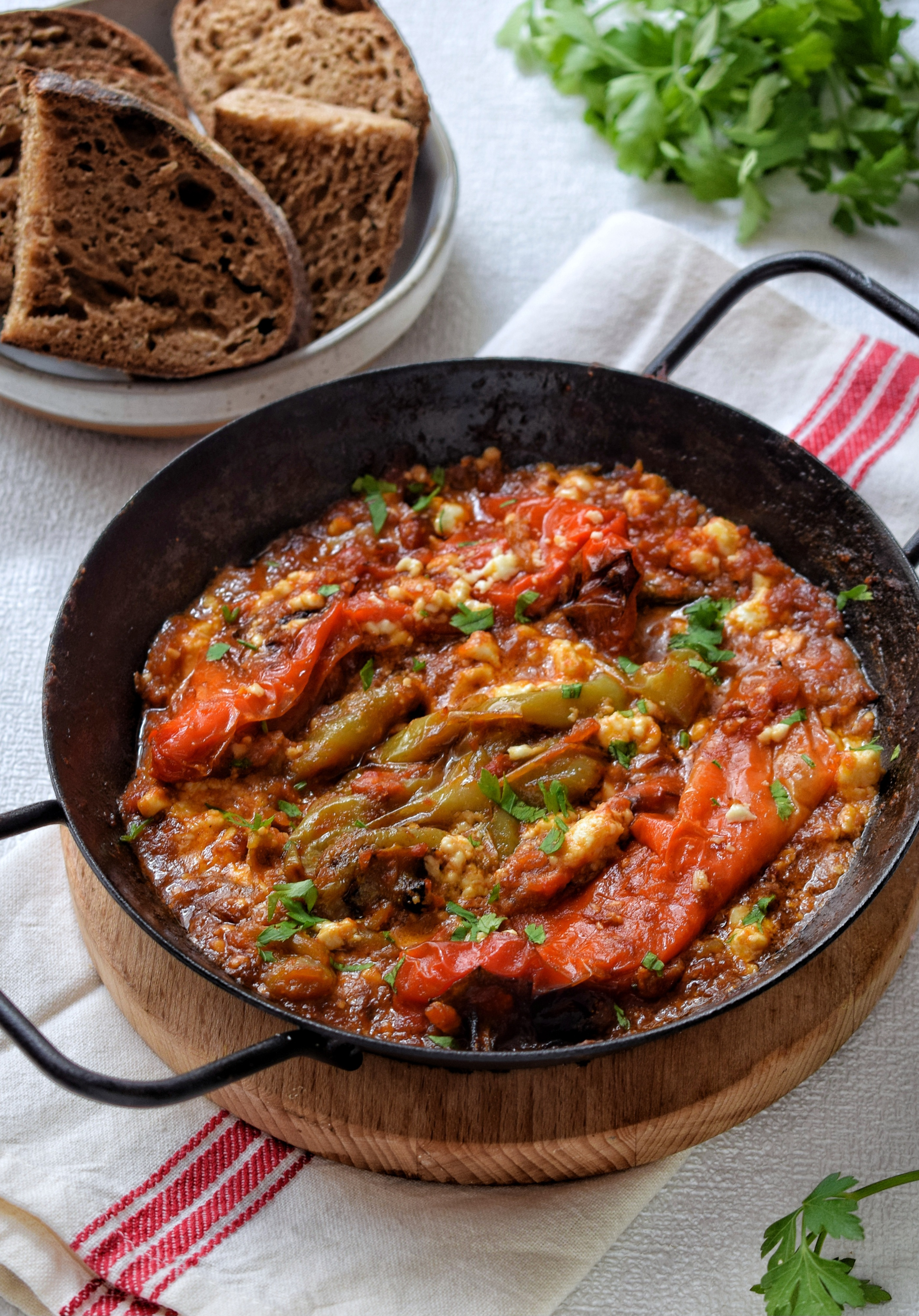
- Course: Main, Side
- Place of origin: Albania
- Region or state: Tirana, Durrës, Kavajë, Shijak, Elbasan
- Serving temperature: Warm
- Main ingredients: red or green peppers, tomatoes, onions, garlic and gjizë, mixed in olive oil
- Variations: Fërgesë with liver

Fërgesë (def. 'Fërgesa') is a traditional Albanian dish prepared mainly in the region of Central Albania. It is a vegetable and cheese casserole made from red or green peppers, tomatoes, onions, garlic and gjizë (a salted Albanian curd cheese), slowly cooked in olive oil and baked until the ingredients combine into a creamy mixture. It is typically served hot as a main course or side dish.

== Ingredients ==
A recipe of four servings includes:

- 3–4 medium green or red peppers
- 5–6 ripe tomatoes
- 1 medium onion
- 350 g salted gjizë (or white cheese)
- 3 cloves of garlic
- 100 ml extra-virgin olive oil
- 2–3 bay leaves
- Salt
- Black pepper

== Preparation ==
Fërgesë is generally prepared during the warmer months of the year, from spring until late autumn, when fresh peppers and tomatoes are in season.

The dish begins by chopping onions, tomatoes and red or green peppers into small pieces and gently sautéing them in extra-virgin olive oil. Garlic is then added, followed by gjizë (or white cheese), which is stirred into the vegetables until a uniform consistency is achieved. One particular recipe substitutes gjizë for liver meat, known locally as Fërgesë Tirane. The mixture is seasoned with salt, black pepper and bay leaves before being transferred to an ovenproof clay bowl and baked at approximately 175 °C (350 °F) for about 15 minutes.

== See also ==
- List of casserole dishes
