= Flying Jacob =

Type of casserole from Sweden

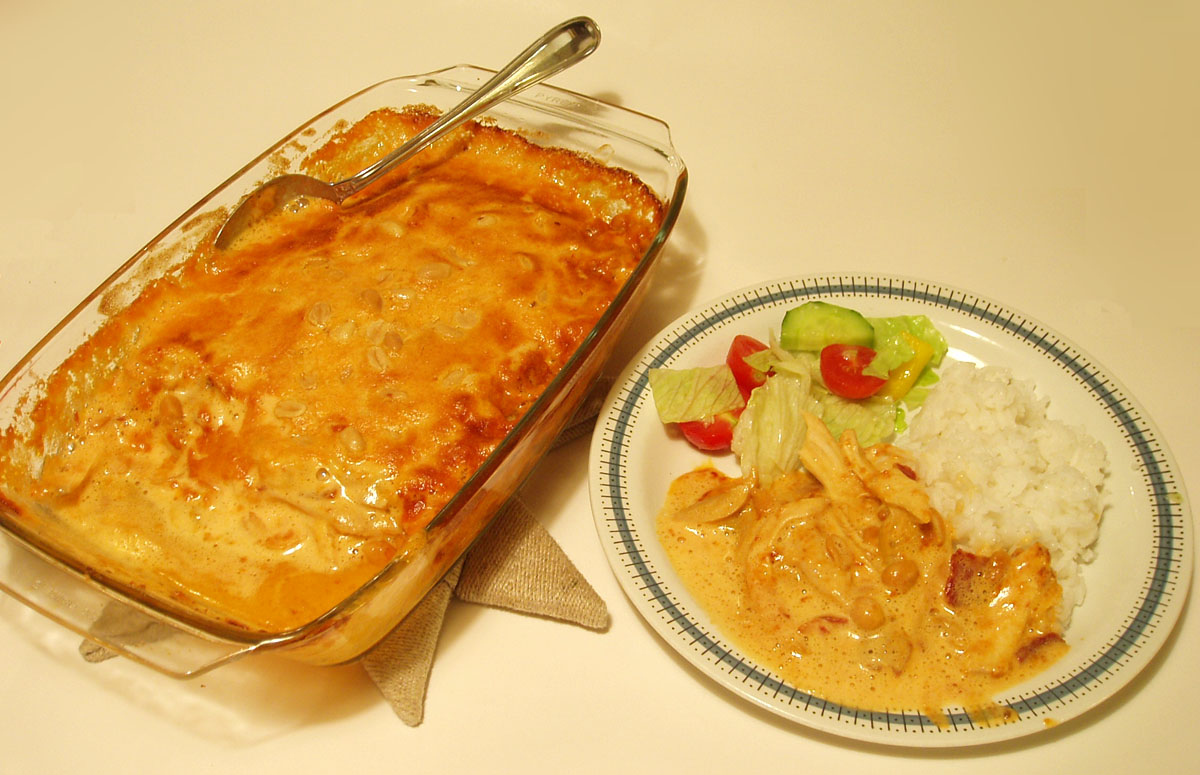
- Flying Jacob with rice and a salad
- Alternative names: Flygande Jacob; Flygande Jakob
- Type: Casserole
- Course: Main
- Place of origin: Sweden
- Created by: Ove Jacobsson
- Invented: 1976
- Serving temperature: Hot
- Main ingredients: Chicken, cream, chili sauce, bananas, roasted peanuts, bacon

Flying Jacob (Swedish: Flygande Jacob/Jakob, pronounced [flyːˈgandɛ jɑːˈkɔp]) is a Swedish casserole made of chicken, bananas, peanuts, and bacon. The dish is baked in an oven and is usually served with rice and a salad.

The dish was invented by Ove Jacobsson, who worked in the air freight industry, hence the name. Asked to make a main dish for a potluck in summer 1976, Jacobsson combined leftover ingredients into a casserole and served it at the party, where it was a hit. His neighbor, Anders Tunberg, worked for Allt om Mat (All about Food) magazine, and thus the recipe was first published in a Swedish cooking magazine the same year.

== See also ==
- List of casserole dishes
- List of chicken dishes
