= Gratin dauphinois =

French potato dish

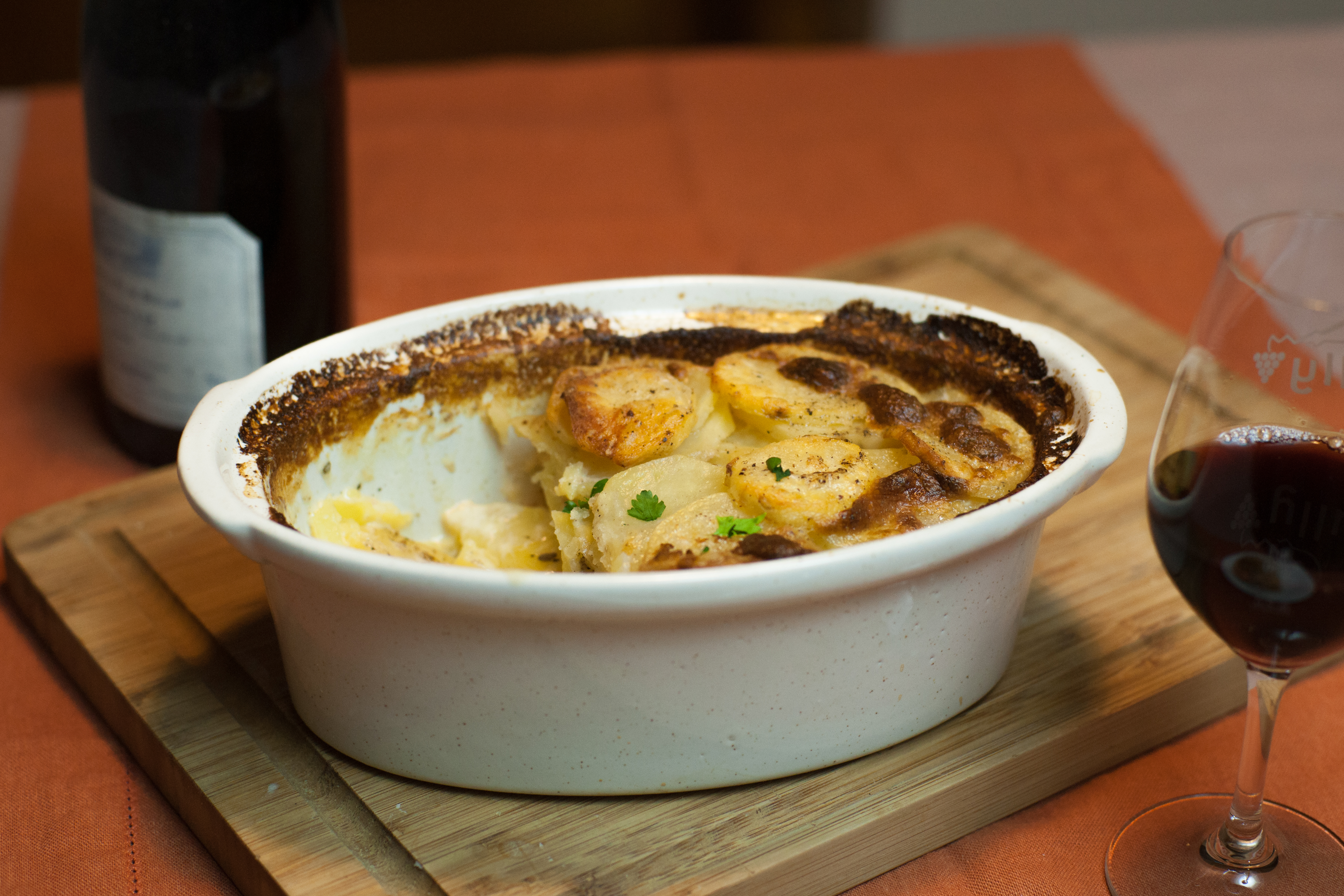
- Gratin dauphinois
- Alternative names: Pommes de terre dauphinoise; Potatoes à la dauphinoise; Gratin de pommes à la dauphinoise; Dauphinois potatoes
- Type: Gratin
- Course: Alone or as accompaniment
- Place of origin: France
- Region or state: Dauphiné
- Main ingredients: Potatoes, cream

Gratin dauphinois (/ˈɡræt.æ̃ ˌdoʊ.fɪˈnwɑː/ GRAT-a doh-fi-NWAH) is a French gratin of sliced raw potatoes baked in cream, from the Dauphiné region in south-eastern France. There are many variants of the name of the dish, including pommes de terre dauphinoise, potatoes à la dauphinoise and gratin de pommes à la dauphinoise.

== History ==
The first mention of the dish is from 12 July 1788. It was served with ortolans at a dinner given by Charles-Henri, Duke of Clermont-Tonnerre and lieutenant-general of the Dauphiné, for the municipal officials of the town of Gap, now in the département of Hautes-Alpes.

== Preparation ==
Gratin dauphinois is made with thinly sliced raw potatoes and cream, cooked in a buttered dish rubbed with garlic; cheese is sometimes added for the Savoyard sister dish. The potatoes are peeled and sliced to the thickness of a coin, usually with a mandoline. They are layered in a shallow earthenware or glass baking dish and cooked in a slow oven; the heat is raised for the last 10 minutes of cooking.

By tradition, the gratin dauphinois does not include cheese, which would make it more similar to a gratin savoyard (which does not include cream). Recipes given by many chefs – including Auguste Escoffier, Austin de Croze and Constance Spry – call for cheese and eggs; others such as Robert Carrier specify cheese but no egg.

The gratin dauphinois is distinguished from ordinary gratin potatoes by the use of raw rather than boiled potatoes. It is a quite different dish from pommes dauphine.

== See also ==
- List of casserole dishes
