= Timbale (food) =

Type of cooking pan, and the foods cooked with it

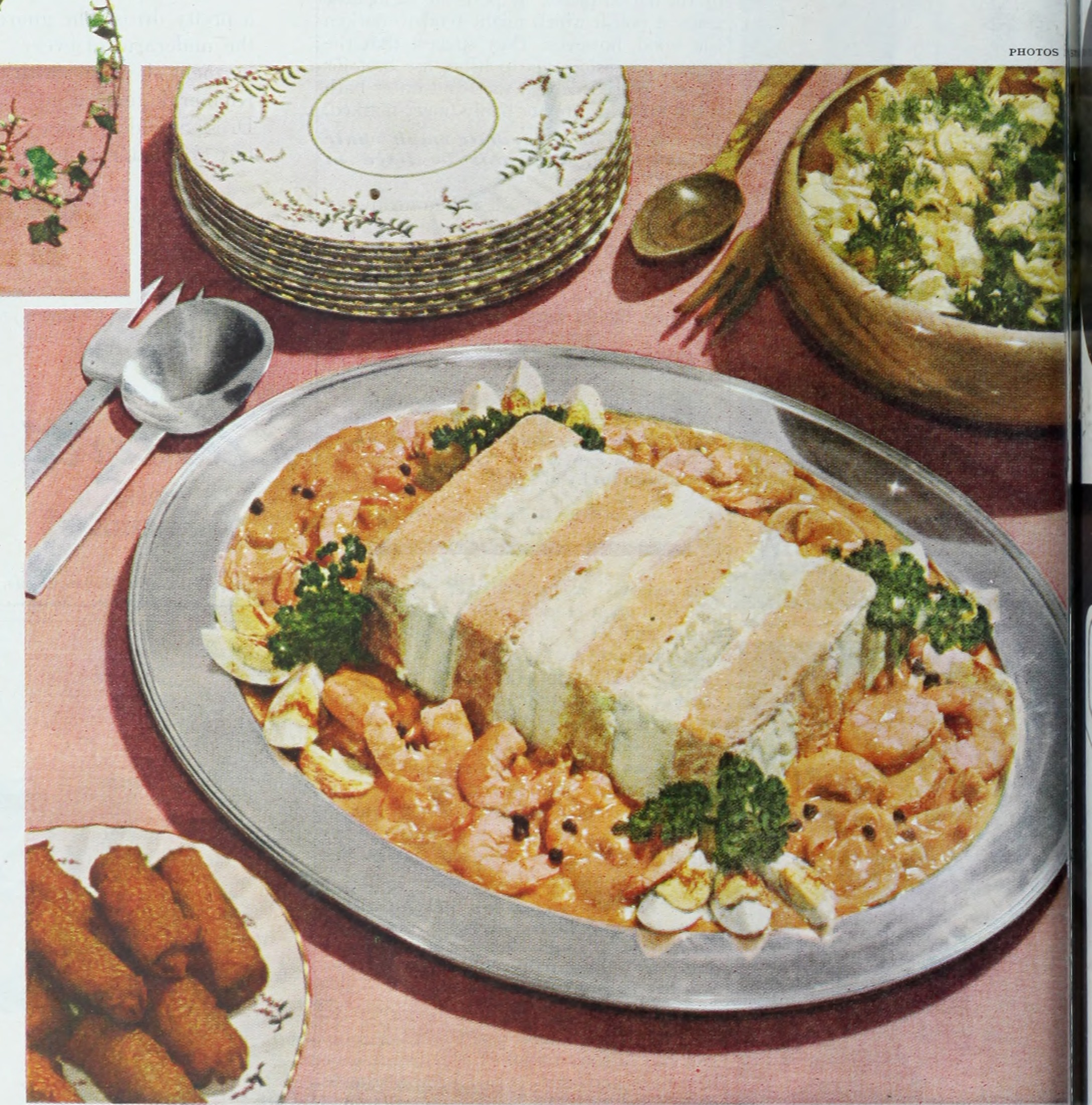
A timbale of salmon and sole

In cooking, timbale (French: [tɛ̃bal]) derived from the French word for "kettledrum", also known as timballo, can refer to either a kind of pan used for baking, or the food that is cooked inside such a pan.

Timbale pans can be large (such as that used to bake a panettone), or they can be small enough to comprise a single portion (like a tartlet pan). Timbales typically narrow toward the bottom. Bundt pans, angelfood cake pans, and springform pans can be substituted for purpose-made timbale bakeware. Timbales can also be steamed or baked in a water bath.

As a dish, a timbale is a "deep dish" filling completely enclosed in a crust. The crust can be sheet pastry, slices of bread, rice, even slices of vegetable. Sartu di Riso is a rice crust timbale. Timballo di Melanzana uses overlapping strips of eggplant to enclose the filling, which can be a wide range of pre-cooked meats, sausages, cheeses, vegetables, and shaped pastas combined with herbs and spices and red or white "gravy", thickened with breadcrumbs if necessary. The assembled dish is then baked, to brown the crust and heat the filling to serving temperature.

== Cultural references ==
There is a detailed description of a rich macaroni timbale in Giuseppe Tomasi di Lampedusa's novel The Leopard:

"The burnished gold of the crusts, the fragrance of sugar and cinnamon they exuded, were but preludes to the delights released from the interior when the knife broke the crust first came a smoke laden with aromas, then chicken-livers, hard-boiled eggs, sliced ham, chicken, and truffles in masses of piping-hot, glistening macaroni, to which the meat juice gave an exquisite hue of suède."

Timbales are also mentioned in P. G. Wodehouse's Jeeves in the Offing (1960).

"And now if you would show me to my room, I will have a bath and brush-up so as to be all sweet and fresh for the evening meal. Does Anatole still do those Timbales de ris de veau toulousaine?" [Timbales with Toulousain veal sweetbreads]

"And the Sylphides a la crème d'écrevisses." [Creamed sylphides of crayfish]

"There is none like him, none," said Kipper, moistening the lips with the tip of the tongue and looking like a wolf that has just spotted its Russian peasant. "He stands alone."

See also The Blind Assassin (2000) by Atwood:

"...the twelve course dinners that went along with it: celery and salted nuts first, chocolates at the end. Consommé, rissoles, timbales, the fish, the roast, the cheese, the fruit, hothouse grapes draped over the etched-glass epergne. Railway-hotel food, I think of it now; ocean liner food..."
