= Funeral potatoes =

Potato dish

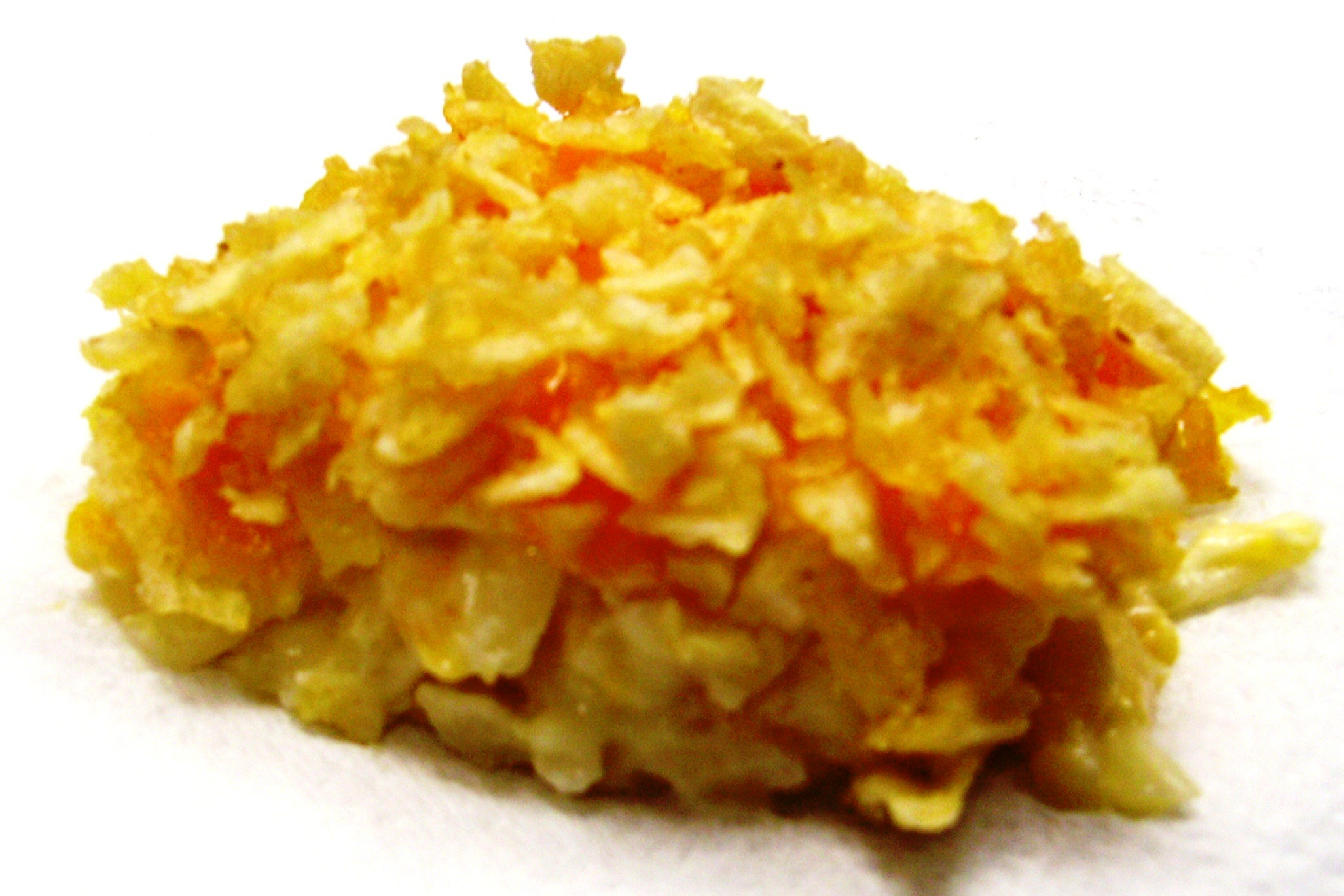
- Type: Hotdish or casserole
- Place of origin: United States
- Region or state: Intermountain West, Midwest
- Main ingredients: Hash browns or cubed potatoes, cheese (cheddar or Parmesan), onions, cream soup (chicken, mushroom, or celery) or cream sauce, sour cream, butter, corn flakes or crushed potato chips

Funeral potatoes is a potato-based hotdish or casserole, similar to au gratin potatoes, popular in the American Intermountain West and Midwest. It is a common side dish during traditional after-funeral dinners, but it is also served at potlucks and other social gatherings, sometimes under different names.

The dish has been associated with members of the Church of Jesus Christ of Latter-day Saints (LDS Church) because of its popularity among members of the church.

== History ==
According to Epicurious, the dish "emerged in Utah’s Mormon community during the late 19th century". According to NPR, the LDS Relief Society served the dish for organization functions, and it spread within the community. Recipes can be found in multiple Relief Society cookbooks dating to the early 20th century. By the mid-20th century recipes called for convenience foods.

Because of its reliance on calorie-laden inexpensive convenience foods often stored by members of the church, the dish could be produced quickly, cheaply, and in large amounts, making it a common choice for occasions where large numbers were expected. It is common for families to store a casserole dish of funeral potatoes in order to have it on hand if needed.

== Ingredients ==
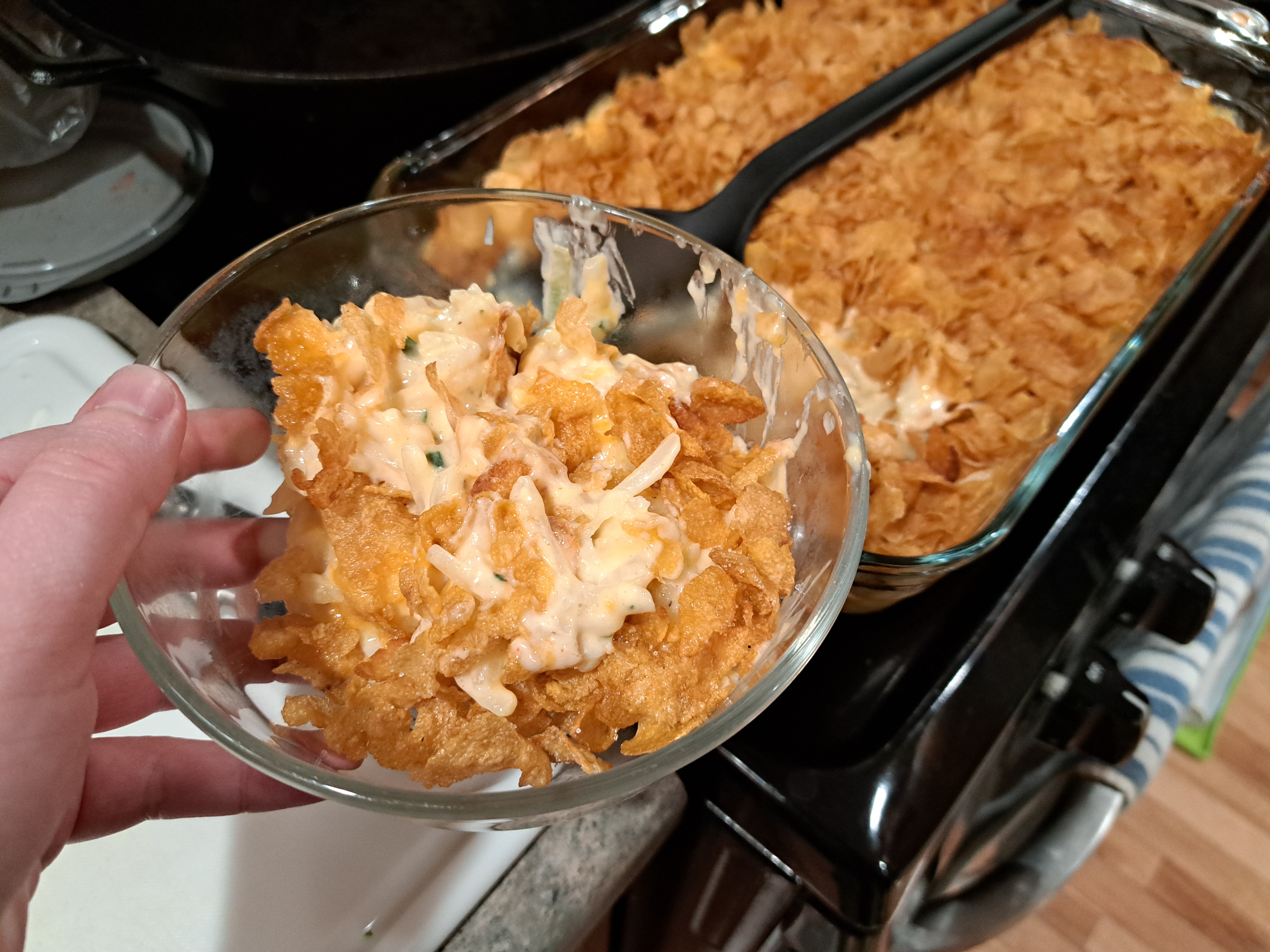
Prepared funeral potatoes with a cornflake topping

The dish is similar to potatoes gratin or au gratin potatoes.

The dish usually consists of hash browns or cubed potatoes, cheese (cheddar or Parmesan), onions, cream soup (chicken, mushroom, or celery) or a cream sauce, sour cream, and a topping of butter with corn flakes or crushed crackers or potato chips. Ingredients in some variations include cubed baked ham, frozen peas, or broccoli florets.

== Popularity ==
The dish is commonly served at social occasions and potlucks and in certain areas is an expected inclusion at funeral receptions in the Jell-O Belt. It is also popular as a side dish at other holiday gatherings in certain areas. The dish is most commonly known in the American Intermountain West and Midwest. A similar dish is known in the American South.

The dish has sometimes been associated with the LDS Church, and with the state of Utah in general, because of its popularity among members of the church. During the 2002 Winter Olympics in Salt Lake City, one of the souvenir collector pins featured a depiction of funeral potatoes.

== Other names ==
In Texas the dish is known as Texas potatoes. It is also known as Mormon funeral potatoes, or Relief Society Potatoes. The dish, or similar casseroles, is also known by other names. In Iowa they are known as party potatoes.

== See also ==
- List of casserole dishes
- List of potato dishes
