= Crunchy Nut =

Breakfast cereal made by Kellogg's

- Product type: Breakfast cereal
- Current owner: Kellogg's
- Country: U.K.
- Introduced: 1980; 46 years ago
- Website: kelloggs.co.uk/crunchynut

Crunchy Nut (previously known as "Crunchy Nut Corn Flakes" in the UK, and "Nut & Honey Crunch"/"Honey & Nut Corn Flakes" in the US) is a breakfast cereal made by Kellogg's with flakes of corn, honey, three types of sugar, and chopped peanuts. The product was created by Kellogg's employees at their Trafford Park factory in Greater Manchester, England and first introduced in 1980.

While always known as Crunchy Nut or Crunchy Nut Corn Flakes in the UK, the cereal has undergone several name changes in the US. It debuted as Honey & Nut Corn Flakes, followed by the minor variation Honey-Nut Corn Flakes. The name changed to Nut & Honey Crunch in 1987 with a memorable ad campaign centered around the "nuttin', honey" pun. In the late '90s, it became Honey Crunch Corn Flakes. Despite this history, a 2011 UK press release announced Crunchy Nut's introduction to the US.

== Ingredients ==
Maize, brown sugar (sugar, molasses), peanuts (7%), sugar, honey (2%), barley malt flavouring, salt, glucose-fructose syrup, niacin, iron, vitamin B_{6}, riboflavin (B_{2}), thiamin (B_{1}), folic acid, vitamin B_{12}.

The high levels of sugar led to Crunchy Nut being rated worst for sugar and at 21st position out of 25 cereals in a health rating by GoodtoKnow.

== Other products ==
UK

Clusters

- Honey & Nut
- Milk Chocolate Curls
- Peanut Butter

Granola

- Caramelised Hazelnuts
- Fruit & Nut
- Hazelnut & Chocolate

Bars

- Crunchy Nut Chocolate Peanut Crisp Bar
- Crunchy Nut Caramel Peanut Crisp Bar
- Chocolate & Nuts Granola Bar
- Cranberry & Nuts Granola Bar
- Almond Nut Butter Bar
- Cocoa Hazelnut Nut Butter Bar

Creations Granola

- 70% Cocoa Chocolate & Honey Roasted Almonds
- Pecan Nuts, Honeycomb & Roasted Almonds

Granola Fusions

- Chocolate & Hazelnut

Other Cereals

- Crunchy Nut Bites
- Crunchy Nut Nutty
- Crunchy Nut Clusters/Bites (Ireland Only)
  - Crunchy Nut Clusters with Chocolate Swirls
- Crunchy Nut Chocolate

USA

- Crunchy Nut: Golden Honey and Nuts
- Crunchy Nut: Nuts and Honey Os
- Crunchy Nut: Caramel Nut

Australia

- Crunchy Nut Clusters
