= Ro-Tel =

Brand of canned tomatoes and green chili

Ro*tel logo

Ro-Tel (stylized as Ro★Tel) is the brand name of a line of canned tomatoes and green chili. There are different varieties of Ro-Tel in varying degrees of hotness and spiciness. The brand was acquired by ConAgra Foods in 2000 from International Home Foods. Ro-Tel gets its name from its inventor, Carl Roettele, who started a family canning company in Elsa, Texas, in the 1940s. It is commonly used in making chile con queso, particularly with Velveeta, and in King Ranch chicken.
