= Timballo =

Italian baked dish

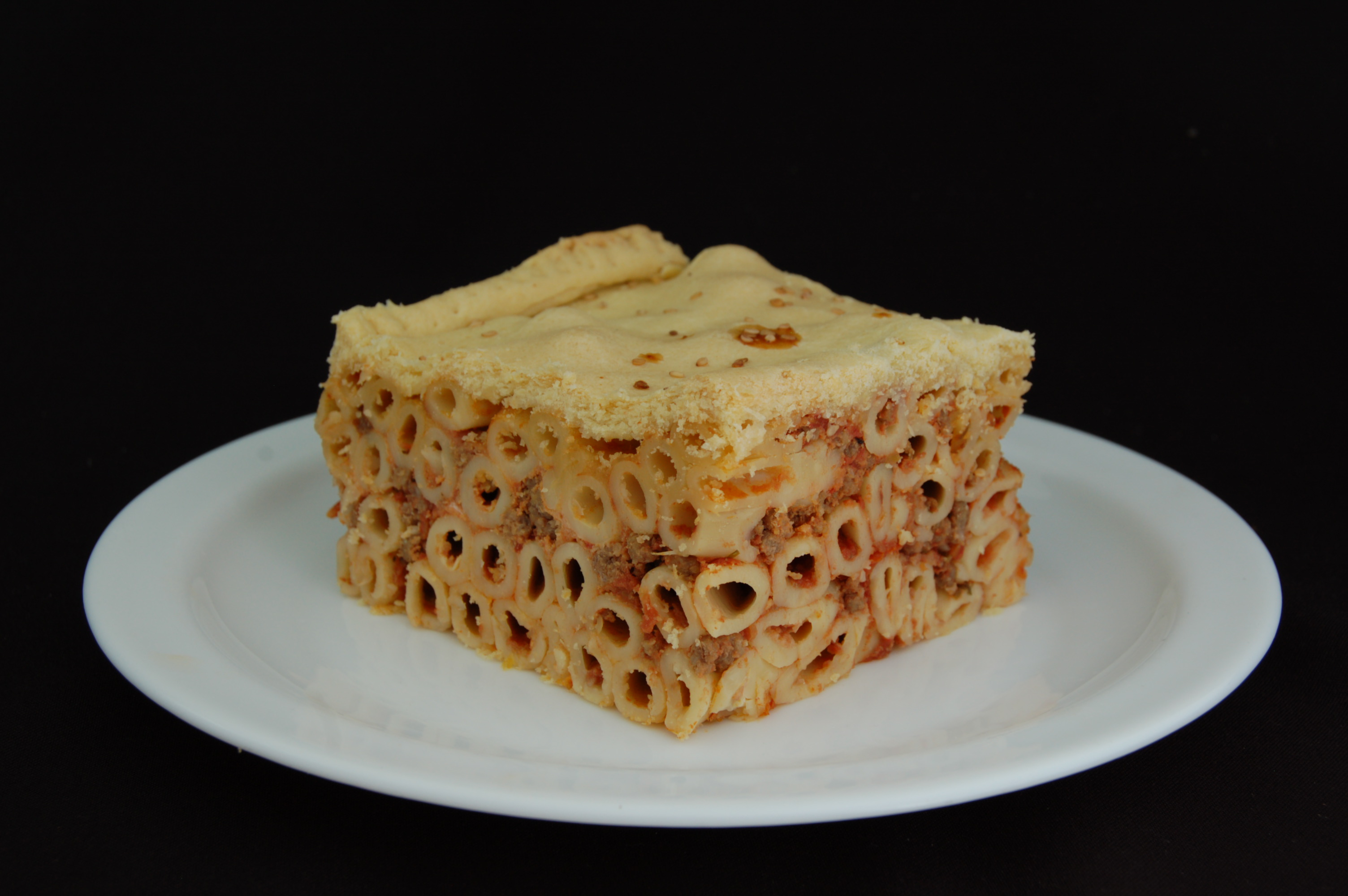
- Place of origin: Italy

Timballo is an Italian dish consisting of pasta, rice or potatoes, with one or more other ingredients (cheese, meat, fish, vegetables or fruit) included. Variations include the mushroom and shrimp sauce timballo Alberoni, named after Giulio Alberoni, and the veal and tomato sauce timballo pattadese.

== Etymology ==
The name comes from the Italian from the French word for 'kettledrum' (timbale). Varieties of timballo differ from region to region, and it is sometimes known as a bomba, tortino, sartù (a type of Neapolitan timballo with rice and tomato sauce) or pasticcio (which is used more commonly to refer to a similar dish baked in a pastry crust). It is also known as timpano and timbale. It is similar to a casserole and is sometimes referred to in English as a pie or savory cake.

== Preparation ==
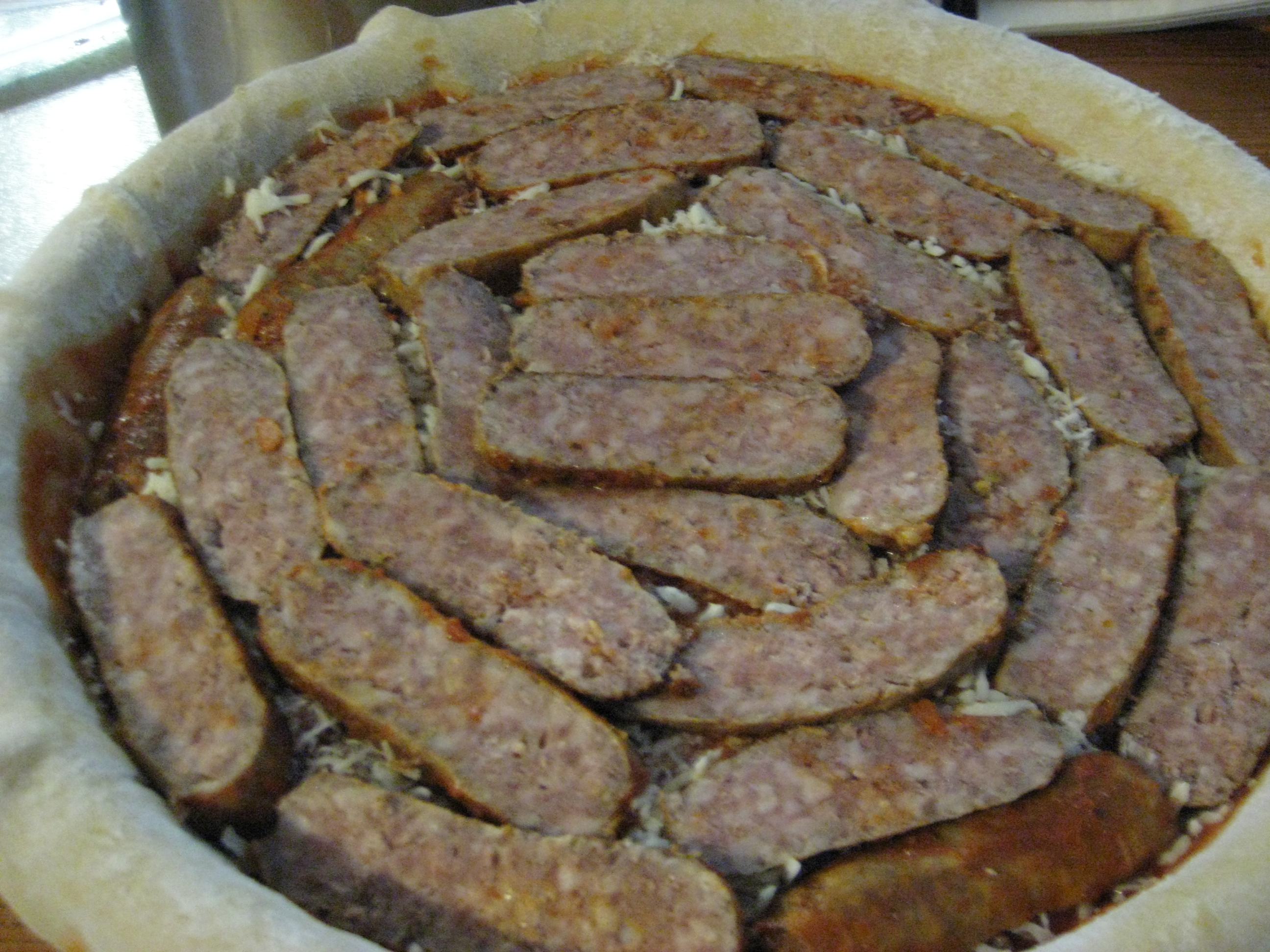
A timballo pattadese being assembled

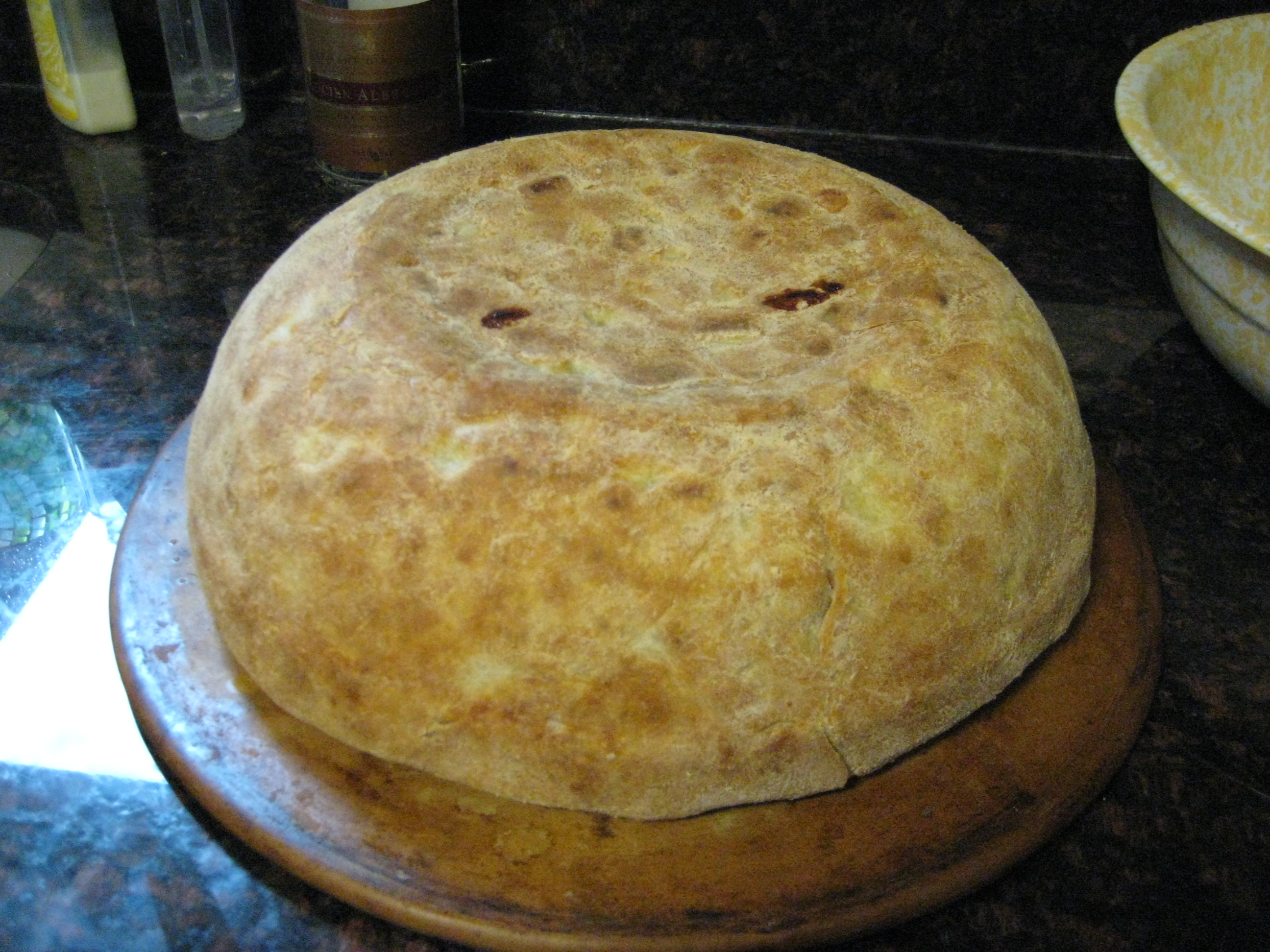
The baked timballo pattadese before slicing

The dish is prepared in a dome or springform pan and eggs or cheese are used as a binder. Rice is commonly used as an ingredient in Emilia-Romagna, where the dish is referred to as a bomba and baked with a filling of pigeon or other game bird, peas, local cheese and a base of dried pasta. Crêpes are used as a base in Abruzzo, and other regions use ravioli or gnocchi. In Sicily, it is typically made with pasta and eggplant.

Mushroom sauce, a rich Piedmontese cheese soup and sauce, are sometimes used, and Anna Del Conte wrote that béchamel is the most consistently used ingredient in timballo.

By the 1990s in Campania, timballo was rarely made in homes, more often purchased as take away from food businesses, whole or by the slice.

== In popular culture ==
An impressive timballo (un torreggiante timballo de macheroni) is served as the first course in a sumptuous formal dinner hosted by the fictional Prince of Salina in Giuseppe Tomasi di Lampedusa's 1958 novel The Leopard, and also features in the 2025 miniseries adaptation of the novel.

Timballo featured prominently in the 1996 film Big Night, although the dish there is referred to as timpano (a regional or family term), Food writer Arthur Schwartz describes this making a "big impression" on American audiences, and several publications printed recipes.

== See also ==
- List of casserole dishes
- List of pasta
- List of pasta dishes
- Lasagna
- Pastitsio
