= Corn flakes =

Type of breakfast cereal

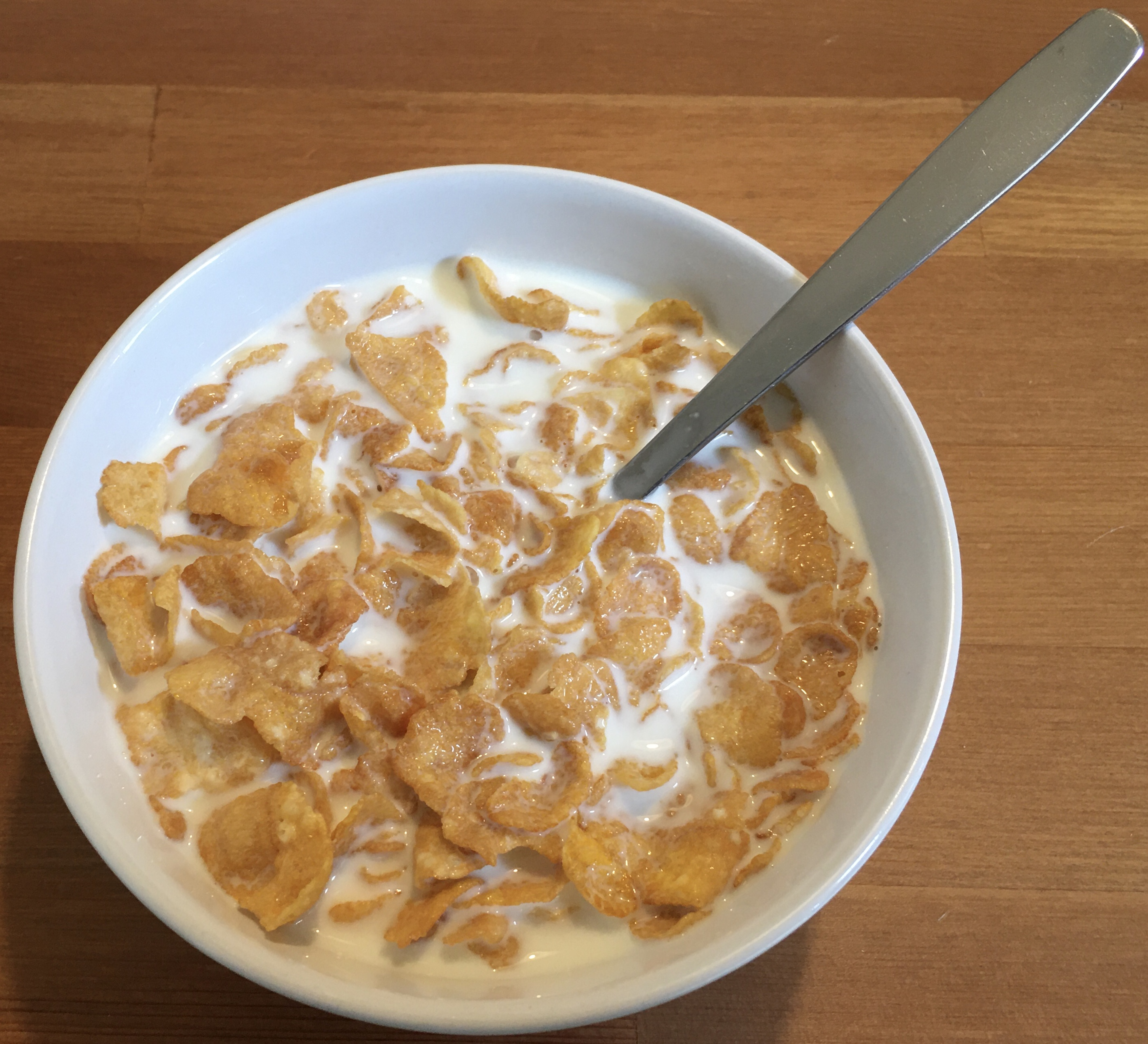
- Kellogg's Corn Flakes, with milk
- Place of origin: United States
- Region or state: Battle Creek Sanitarium in Michigan
- Created by: John Harvey Kellogg (1894); W. K. Kellogg
- Invented: 1894
- Main ingredients: Milled corn, sugar, malt flavoring
- Variations: Multiple
- Food energy (per serving): 100 kcal (420 kJ)

Corn flakes, or cornflakes, is a breakfast cereal made from toasting flakes of corn (maize). Originally invented as a breakfast food to counter indigestion, it has become a popular food item in the American diet and in the United Kingdom where over 6 million households consume them.

The cereal, originally made with wheat, was created by Will Kellogg in 1894 for patients at the Battle Creek Sanitarium where he worked with his brother John Kellogg who was the superintendent. The breakfast cereal proved popular among the patients and Kellogg subsequently started what became the Kellogg Company to produce corn flakes for the wider public. A patent for the process was granted in 1896, after a legal battle between the two brothers.

With corn flakes becoming popular in the wider community, a previous patient at the sanitarium, C. W. Post, started to make rival products. Kellogg continued to experiment with various ingredients and different grains. In 1928, he started to manufacture Rice Krispies, another successful breakfast cereal.

There are many generic brands of corn flakes produced by various manufacturers. As well as being used as a breakfast cereal, the crushed flakes can be a substitute for bread crumbs in recipes and can be incorporated into many cooked dishes.

== Description ==
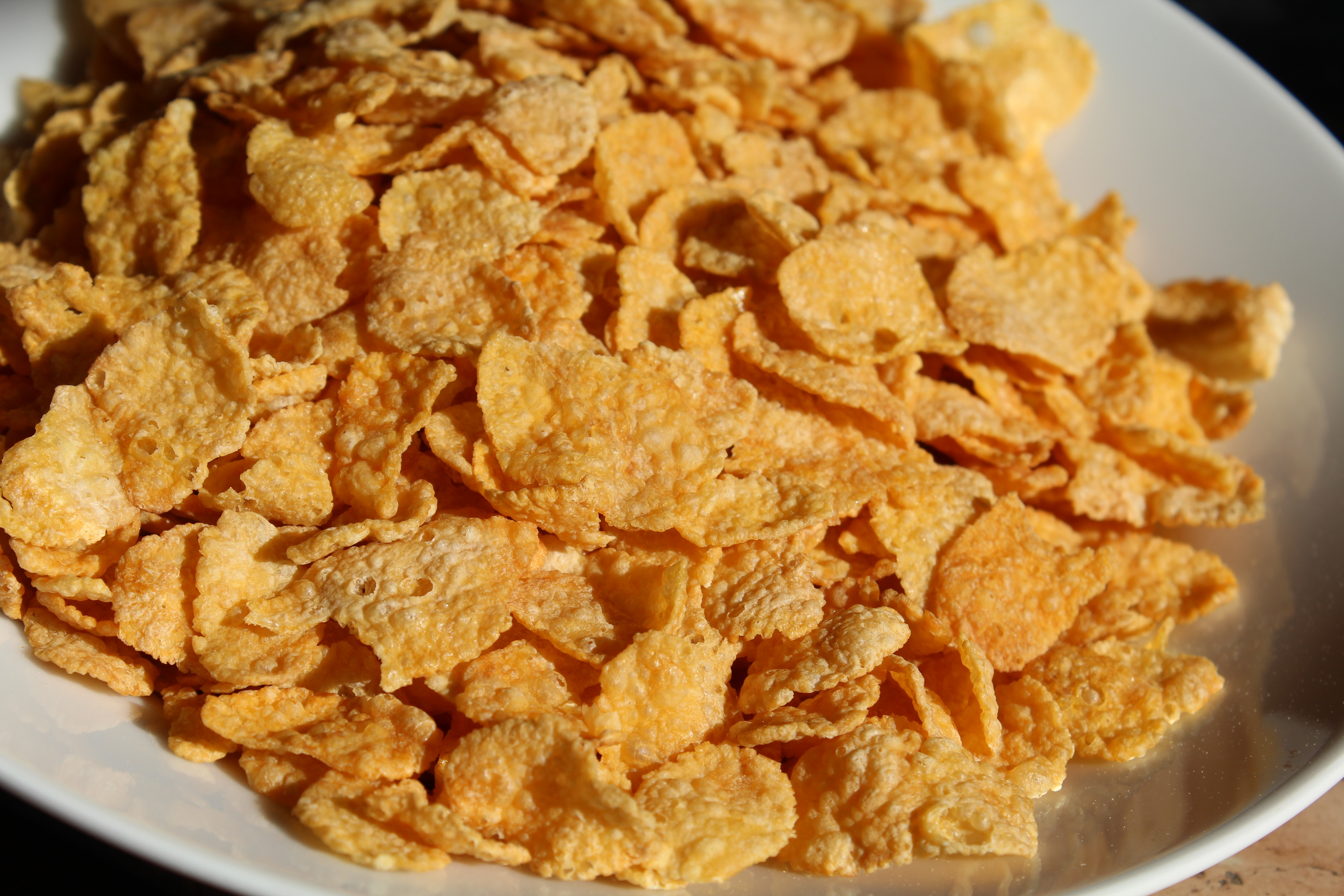
The dry cereal prior to milk being added

Corn flakes are a packaged cereal product formed from small toasted flakes of corn, usually served cold with milk and sometimes sugar. Since their original production, the plain flakes have been flavored with salt, sugar, and malt, and many successive products with additional ingredients have been manufactured such as sugar frosted flakes and honey & nut corn flakes.

== History ==
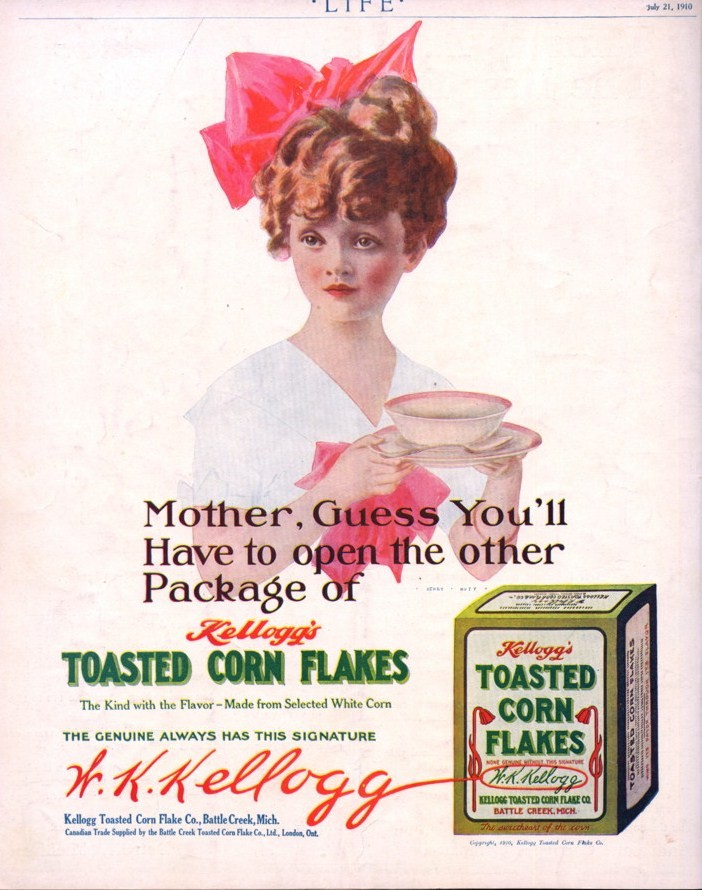
Advertisement for Kellogg's Toasted Corn Flakes from the July 21, 1910 issue of Life magazine

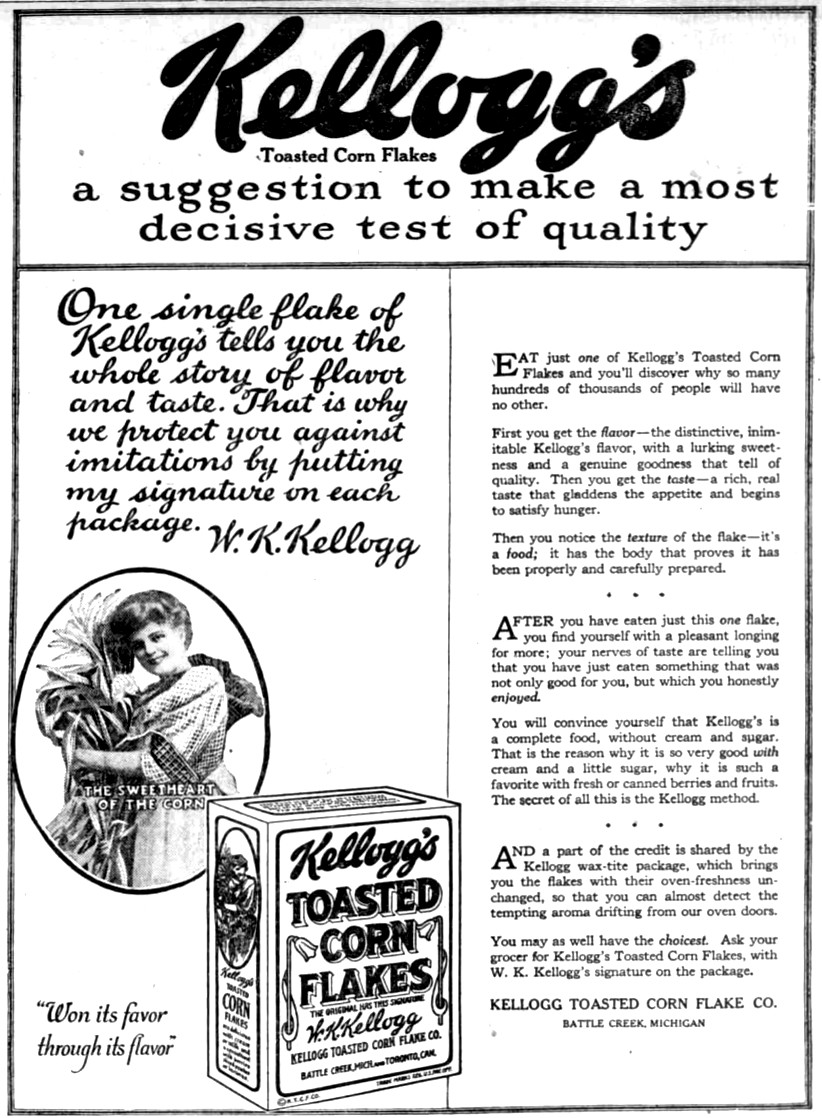
A newspaper advertisement for Kellogg's Toasted Corn Flakes in 1919

The development of the flaked cereal in 1894 has been variously described by John Kellogg, his wife Ella Eaton Kellogg, his younger brother Will, and other family members. There is considerable disagreement over who was involved in the discovery, and the role that they played. According to some accounts, Ella suggested rolling out the dough into thin sheets, and John developed a set of rollers for the purpose. According to others, John had the idea in a dream, and used equipment in his wife's kitchen to do the rolling. It is generally agreed that upon being called out one night, John Kellogg left a batch of wheat-berry dough behind. Rather than throwing it out the next morning, he sent it through the rollers and was surprised to obtain delicate flakes, which could then be baked. Will Kellogg was tasked with figuring out what had happened and recreating the process reliably. Ella and Will were often at odds, and their versions of the story tend to minimize or deny each other's involvement, while emphasizing their own. Tempering, the process the Kelloggs had discovered, was to become a fundamental technique of the flaked cereal industry.

A patent for "Flaked Cereals and Process of Preparing Same" was filed on May 31, 1895, and issued on April 14, 1896, to John Harvey Kellogg as Patent No. 558,393. Significantly, the patent applied to a variety of types of grains, not just to wheat. John Harvey Kellogg was the only person named on the patent. Will later insisted that he, not Ella, had worked with John, and repeatedly asserted that he should have received more credit than he was given for the discovery of the flaked cereal.

The flakes of grain, which the Kellogg brothers called Granose, were a very popular food among the patients. The brothers then experimented with other flakes from other grains. In 1906, Will Keith Kellogg, who served as the business manager of the sanitarium, decided to try to mass-market the new food. At his new company, Battle Creek Toasted Corn Flake Company, he added sugar to the flakes to make them more palatable to a mass audience, but this caused a rift between his brother and him. In 1907, his company ran an ad campaign which offered a free box of cereal to any woman who winked at her grocer. To increase sales, in 1909 he added a special offer, the Funny Jungleland Moving Pictures Booklet, which was made available to anyone who bought two boxes of the cereal. This same premium was offered for 22 years. At the same time, Kellogg also began experimenting with new grain cereals to expand its product line. Rice Krispies, his next great hit, first went on sale in 1928.

The first mascot of Kellogg's Corn Flakes was a female figure, The Sweetheart of the Corn, who appeared on the first boxes. In 1957 Cornelius The Rooster or Corny, created by Leo Burnett advertising agency, made his debut first on boxes of Corn Flakes and later in television commercials. In early commercials, he would speak the catchphrase "Wake up, up, up to Kellogg's Cornflakes!" Dallas McKennon and Andy Devine voiced him. Later, he stopped talking and simply crowed. The concept of using a stylized rooster originated from a suggestion by family friend Nansi Richards, a harpist from Wales, based on the similarity between ceiliog, the Welsh word for "rooster", and Kellogg's (unrelated) surname.

There is a disputed claim that corn flakes were intended to suppress sexual desire. Kellogg did promote a "simple, pure and unstimulating diet" for that reason, but the marketing and patent on corn flakes made no mention of it.

== In cooking ==
There are a wide variety of different recipes for dishes involving corn flakes and crushed corn flakes can even be a substitute for bread crumbs.

Honey joys are a popular party snack in Australia. They are made by mixing corn flakes with honey, butter and sugar and baking in patty cases or muffin cups. A variant popular in the UK is chocolate corn flake cakes, or chocolate nests, made with corn flakes, dark chocolate, golden syrup and butter. Typically made at Easter for or by children, and topped with Mini Eggs. In New Zealand, corn flakes are a core ingredient in Afghan biscuits, a chocolate biscuit made with corn flakes and topped with chocolate icing. In Mormon culture, corn flakes are a primary ingredient in funeral potatoes, a type of potato casserole common at family dinners and community parties.

=== Gallery ===
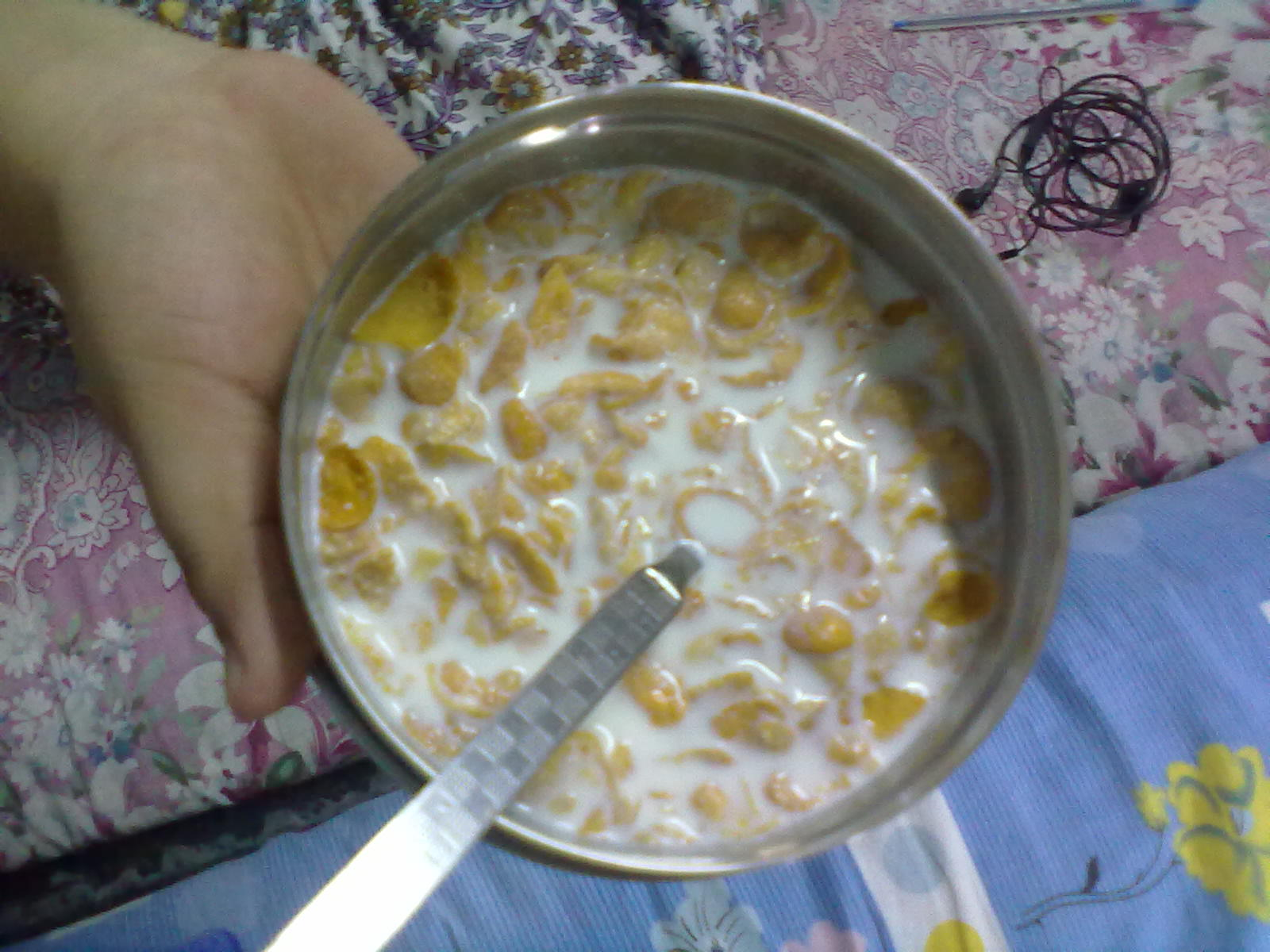
Corn flakes with milk

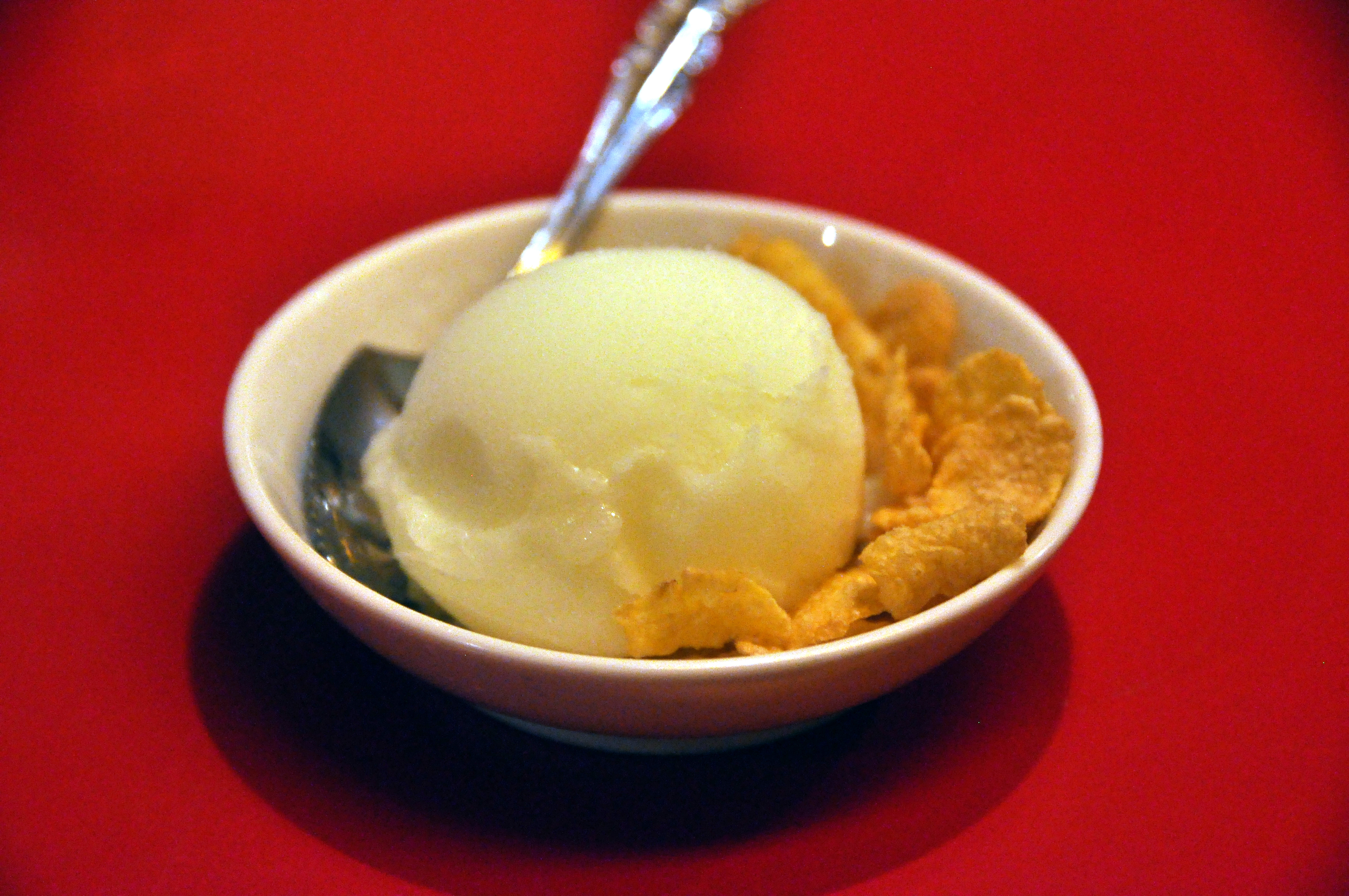
Lime sorbet with cornflakes

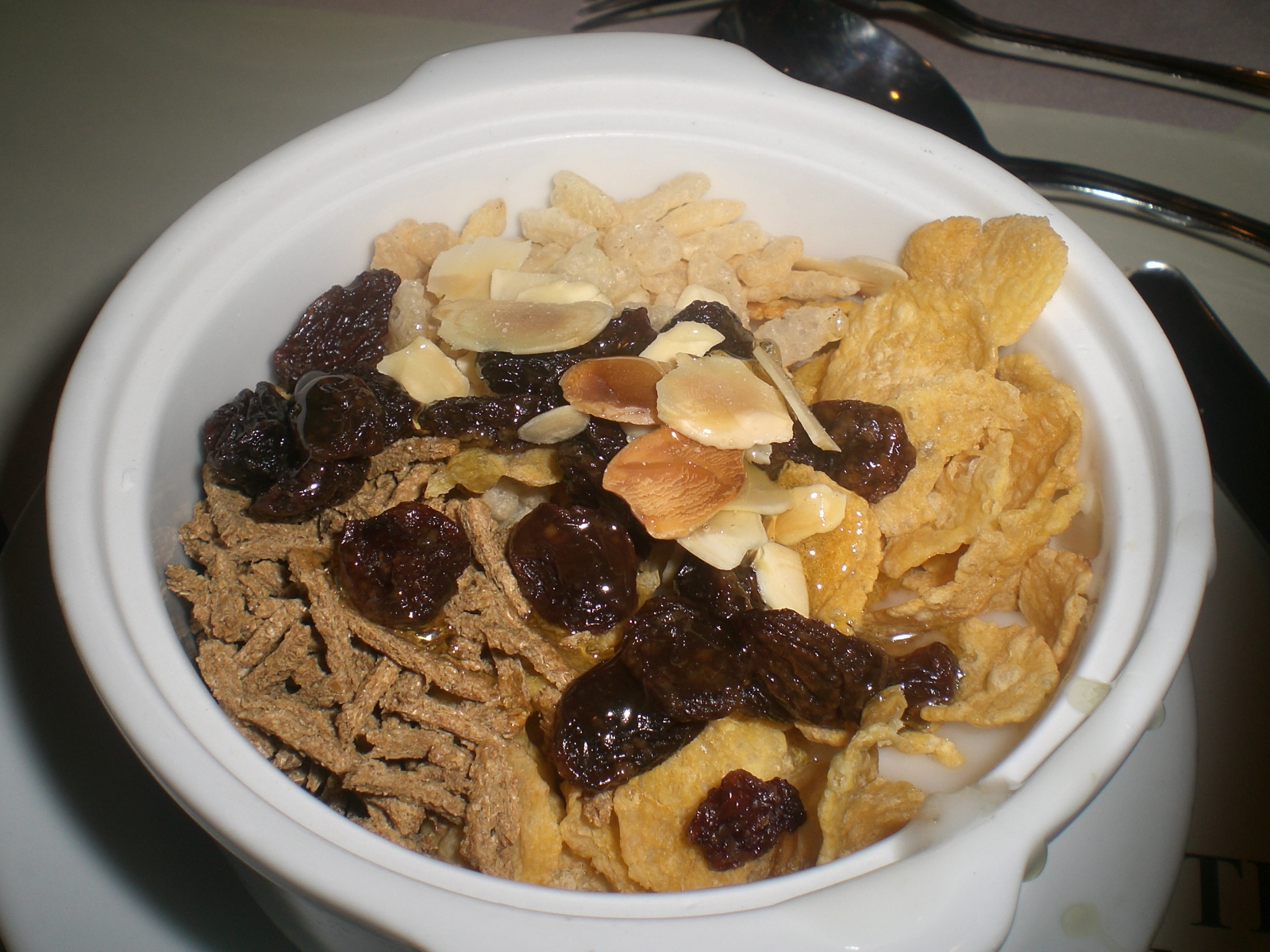
Cornflakes with dry fruits

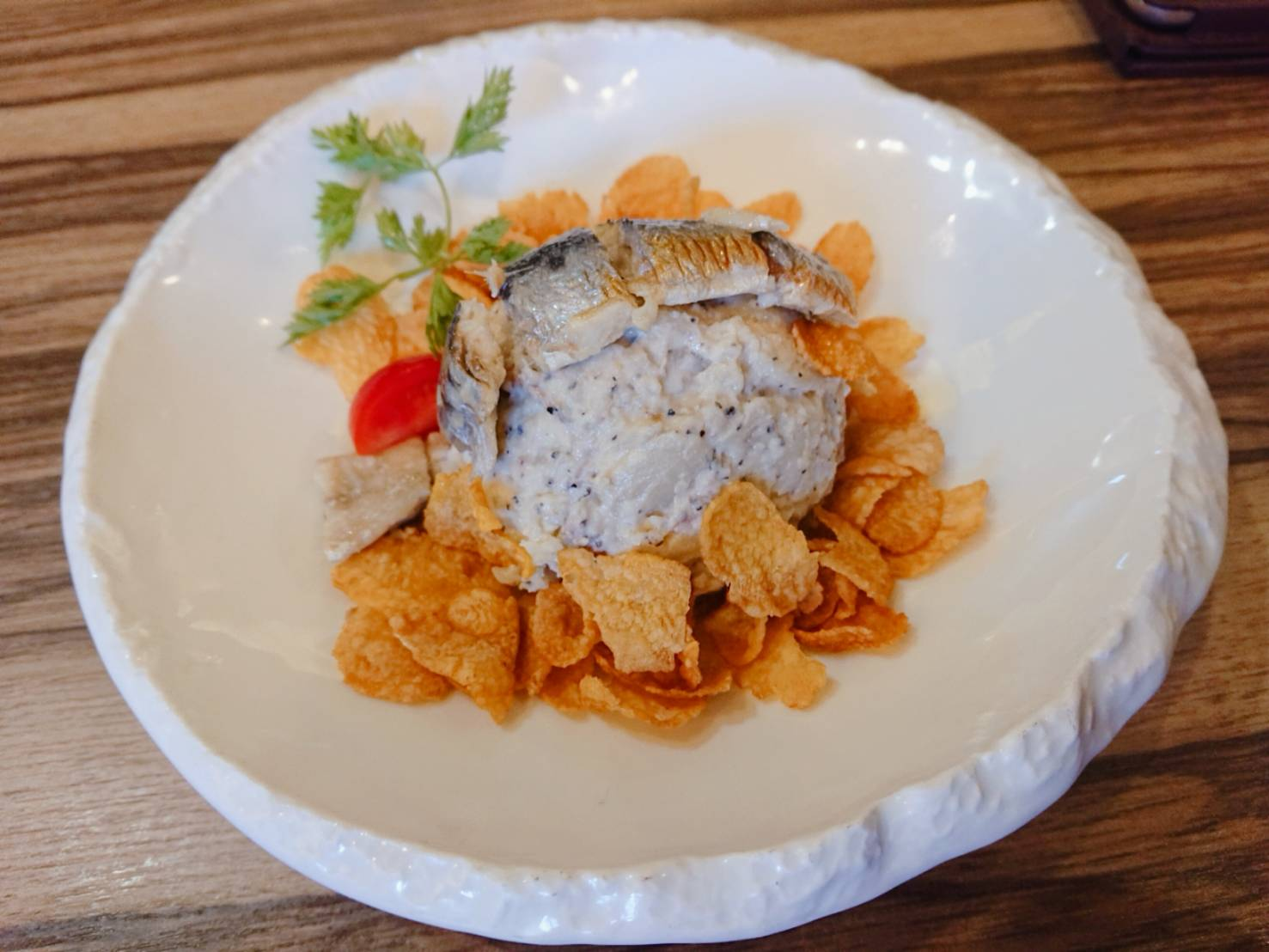
Japanese salad with corn flakes

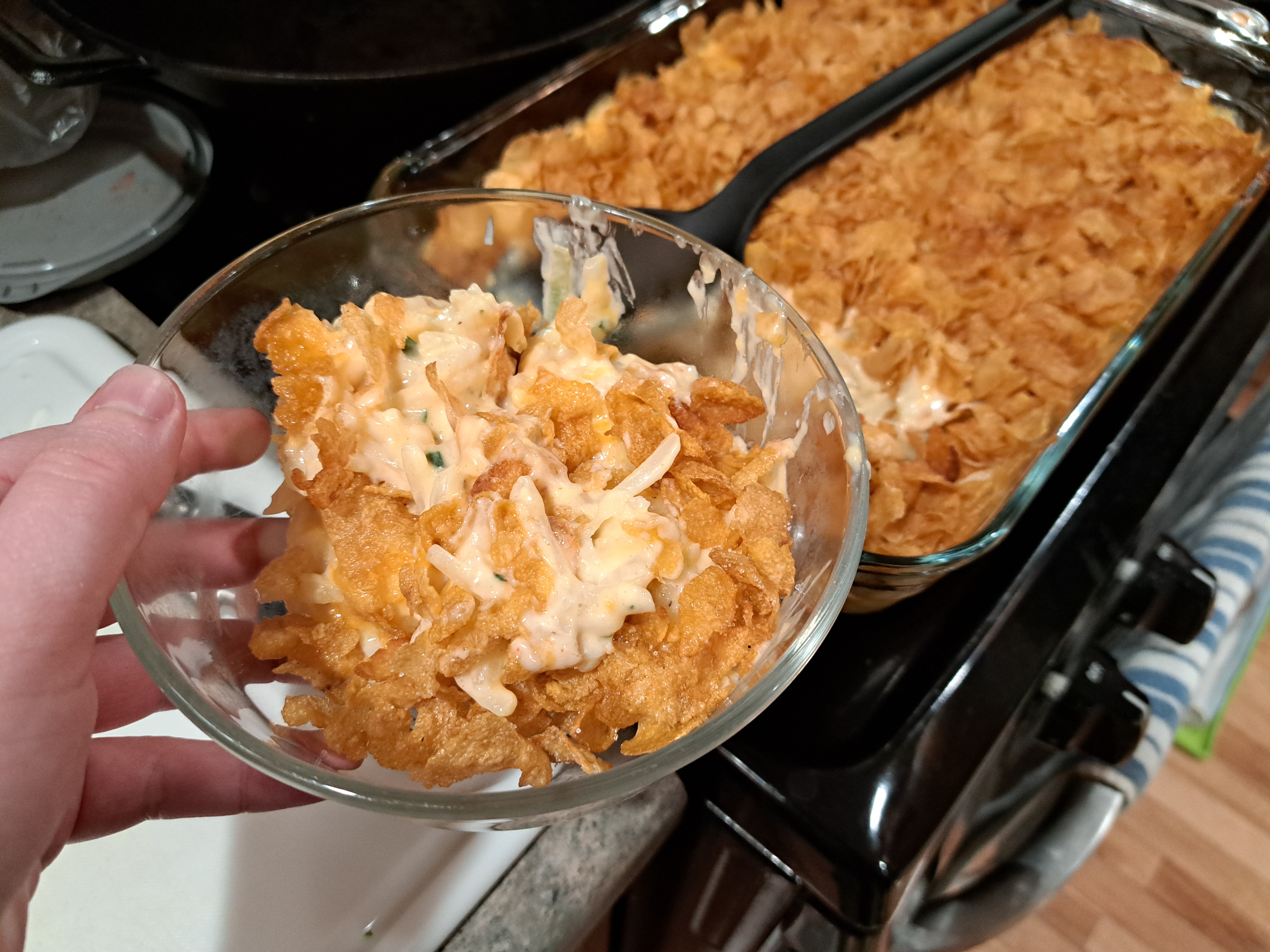
Funeral potatoes

== See also ==
- Feuilletine
- Genetically modified maize
- List of maize dishes
