= Farmer cheese =

Pressed cottage cheese

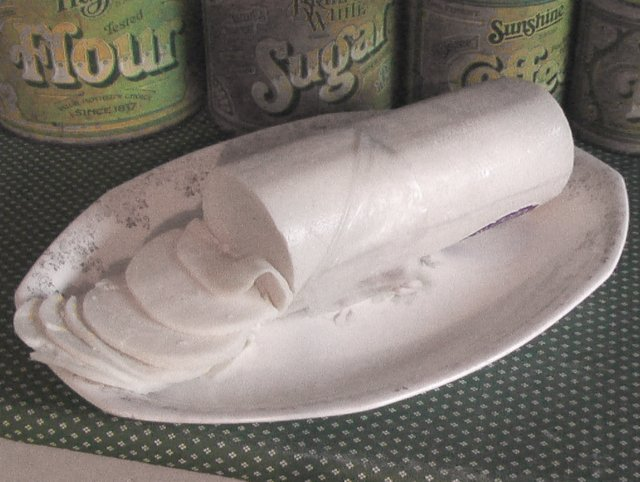
Farmer cheese

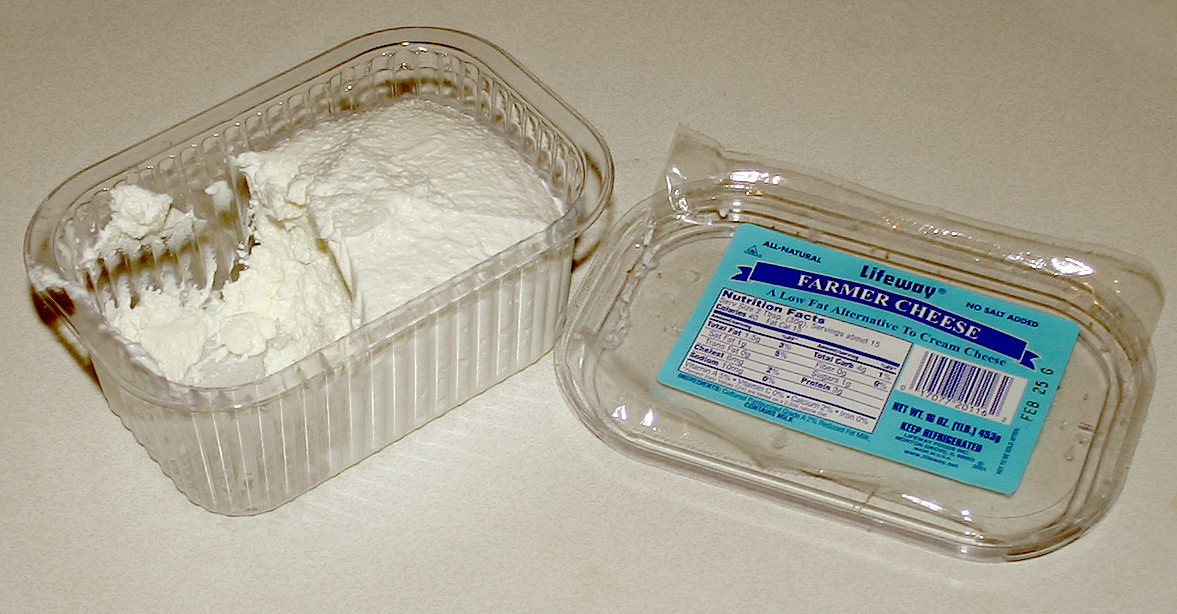
Store-bought farmer cheese

Farmer's cheese is pressed curds or an unripened cheese made by adding rennet and bacterial starter to coagulate and acidify milk. Farmer's cheese may be made from the milk of cows, sheep, or goats, with each giving its own texture and flavor.

== Types ==
According to a cheese technologist at the University of Wisconsin–Madison, there are three cheeses known as farmer cheese:

- American-style farmer cheese, which is cottage cheese pressed to remove water
- European-style farmer cheese, which is tvorog
- Wisconsin/Amish-style farmer cheese, which is firm and similar to Monterey Jack
