= Mornay sauce =

Type of béchamel sauce including cheese

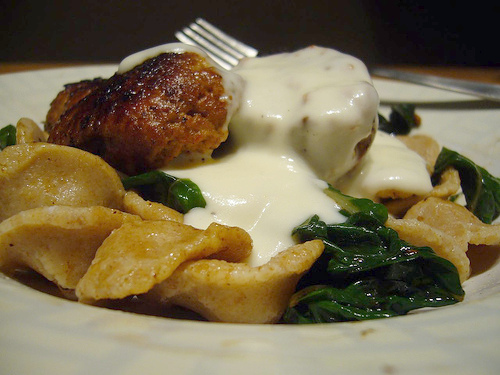
- Type: Sauce
- Place of origin: France
- Main ingredients: Béchamel sauce, Gruyère, Parmesan

A Mornay sauce is a béchamel sauce with grated cheese added. The usual cheeses in French cuisine are Parmesan and Gruyère, but other cheeses may also be used. In French cuisine, it is often used in fish dishes. In American cuisine, a Mornay sauce made with cheddar is commonly used for macaroni and cheese.

== Etymology ==
The origin of the name is uncertain. It may be named after Philippe, duc de Mornay (1549–1623), the French diplomat and writer, but a cheese sauce during this time would have to have been based on a velouté sauce because béchamel had not yet been developed, so the cheese sauce that the Duke would have known was different from the contemporary version.

Sauce Mornay does not appear in Le cuisinier Royal, 10th edition, 1820, perhaps because sauce Mornay is not older than the seminal Parisian restaurant Le Grand Véfour, where sauce Mornay was introduced.

== Ingredients ==
Mornay sauce is a smooth sauce made from béchamel sauce (butter, flour, milk), grated cheese, salt, and pepper, and often enriched with egg yolk. When used for fish, the sauce is generally thinned with fish broth. The cheese may be Parmesan and Gruyère, Parmesan alone, Gruyère alone, or various other cheeses.

== See also ==
- Cheese sauce
- Croque-monsieur
- French mother sauces
- Welsh rarebit
- List of sauces
