= Casserole =

Variety of cooking pot and general category of foods cooked inside it

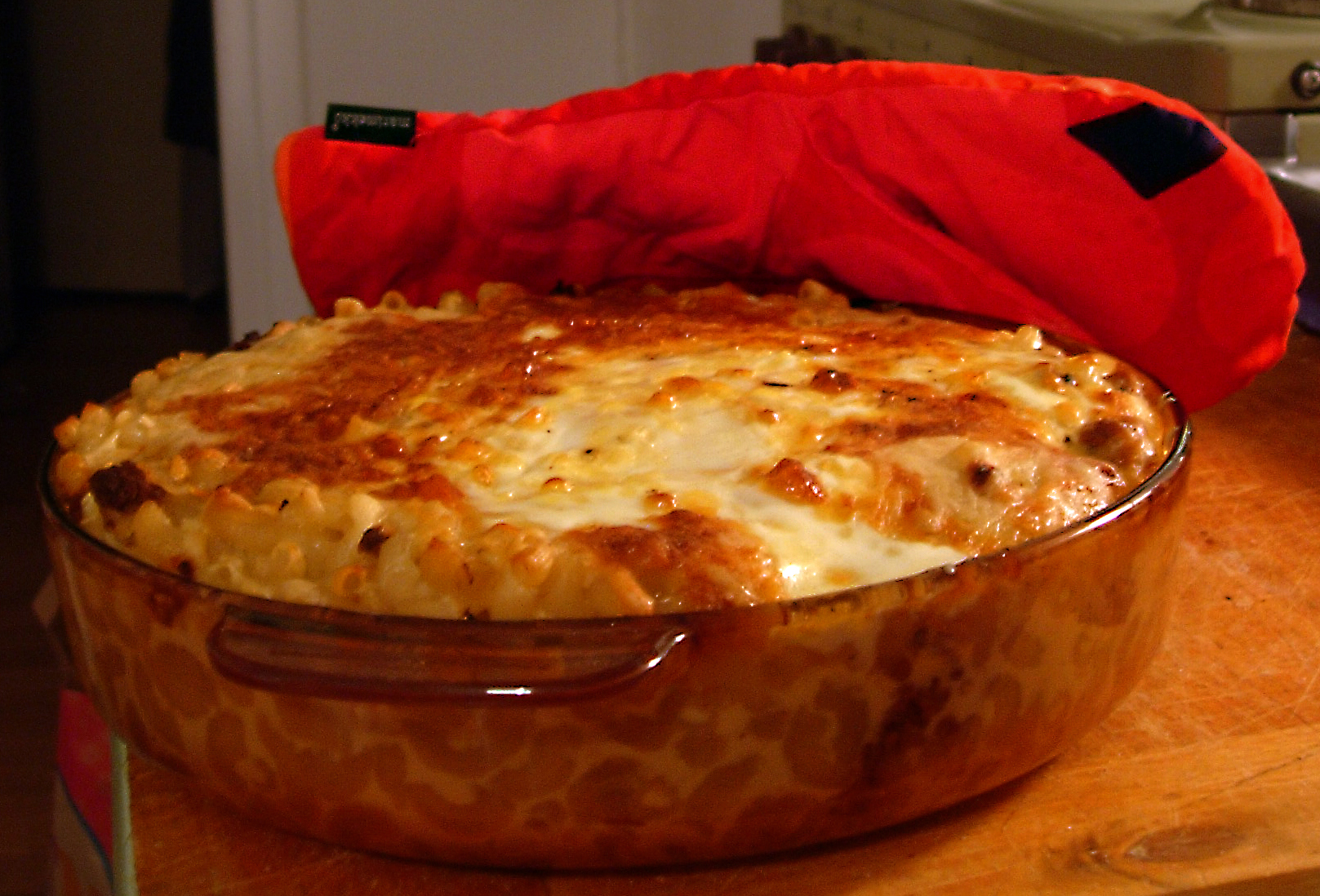
- Macaroni casserole with cheese topping
- Course: Main course
- Place of origin: Europe
- Main ingredients: Chopped vegetables, meat and starchy binder
- Variations: Vegetable, chicken, cheese, beef, fish, seafood, mutton, etc.

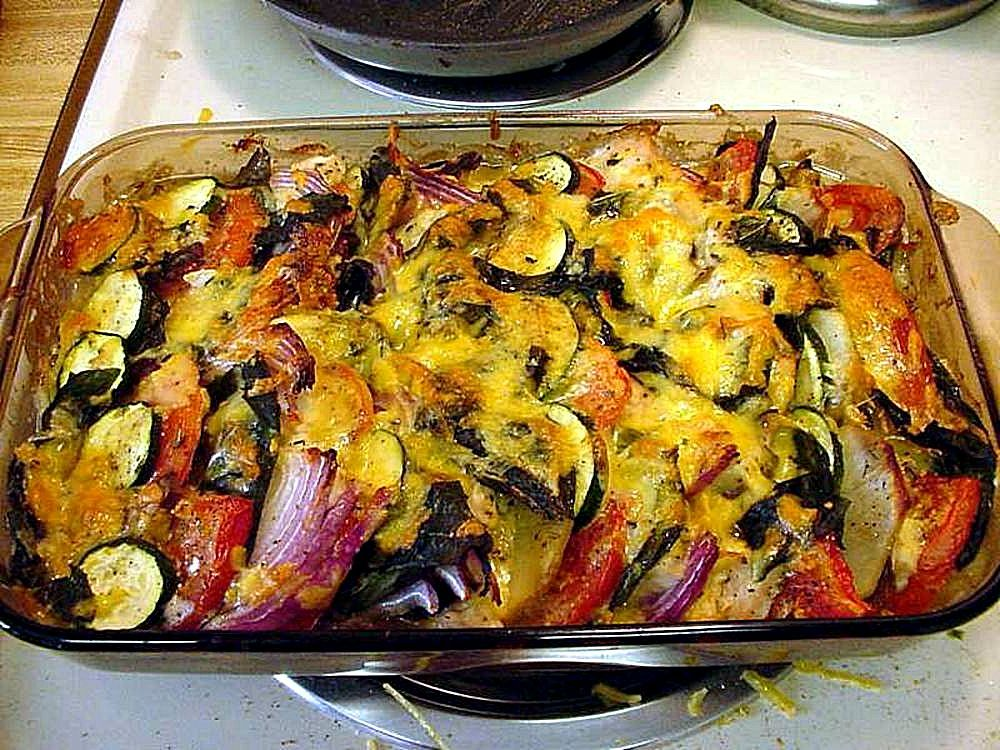
Vegetable casserole

A casserole (French: diminutive of casse, from Provençal cassa, meaning 'saucepan') is a kind of large, deep pan or bowl used for cooking a variety of dishes in the oven. It is also the name given to a category of one-pot foods cooked in such a vessel. To distinguish the two uses, the pan can be called a "casserole dish" or "casserole pan", whereas the food is simply "a casserole". The same pan is often used both for cooking and for serving. Casserole are cooked with a surrounding heat in the oven, while the similar Stew is cooked above the heat source.

== History ==
Early casserole recipes consisted of rice that was pounded, pressed, and filled with a savoury mixture of meat such as chicken or sweetbread. Sometime around the 1870s the casserole seems to have taken on its current definition. Cooking in earthenware containers has been common in many cultures, but the idea of casserole cooking as a one-dish meal became popular in the United States in the twentieth century, especially in the 1950s when new forms of lightweight metal and glass cookware appeared on the market. By the 1970s casseroles took on a less-than-sophisticated image. Culinary experts, such as John F. Mariani, attribute this to the beginning of the dark ages of American culinary culture.

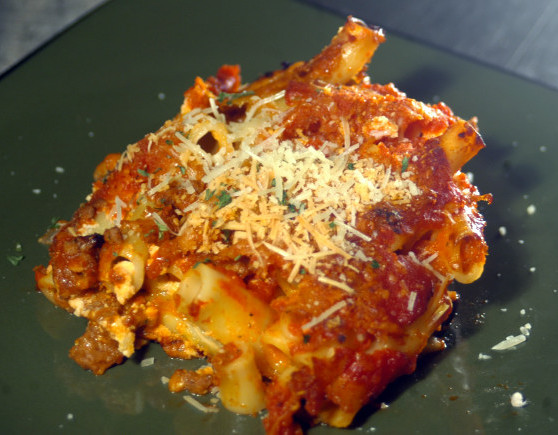
Baked ziti is another popular pasta and ground meat–based casserole.

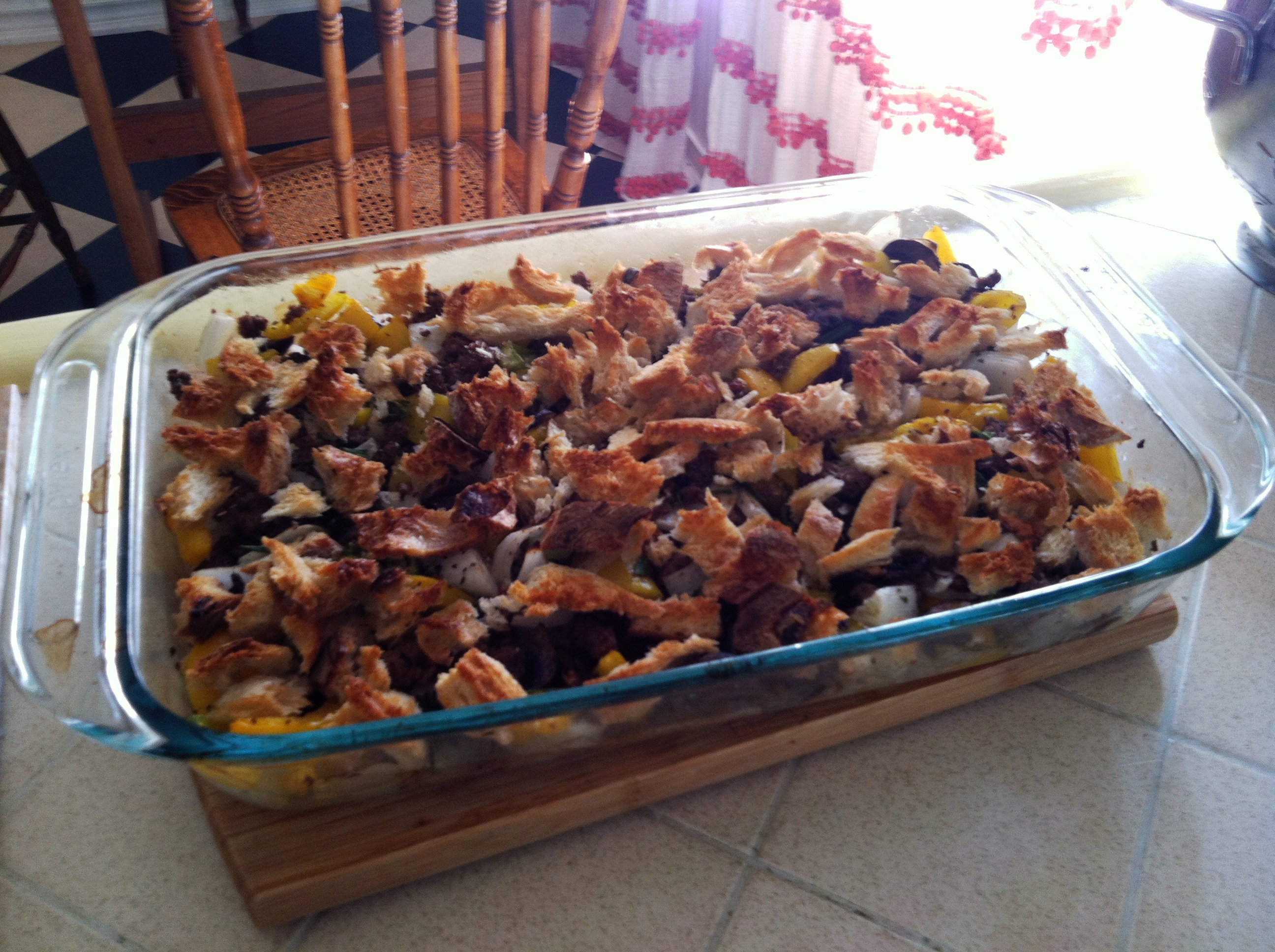
An ad hoc American casserole with ground beef, onions, peppers, mushrooms, herbs, spices, and bread

== American-style casserole ==
In the United States, a casserole or hot dish is typically a baked food with three main components: pieces of meat (such as chicken or ground meat) or fish (such as tuna) or other protein (such as beans or tofu), various chopped or canned vegetables (such as green beans or peas), and a starchy binder (such as flour, potato, rice or pasta); sometimes, there is also a crunchy or cheesy topping. Liquids are released from the meat and vegetables during cooking, and further liquid in the form of stock, wine, beer, gin, cider, vegetable juice, or even water may be added when the dish is assembled. Casseroles are usually cooked slowly in the oven, often uncovered. They may be served as a main course or side dish, and, conveniently, may be served in the vessel in which they were cooked.

== Other cuisines ==
Many baked dishes served in the baking dish can be classed as casseroles. Examples include Khoresh Bademjan (Persian Lamb & Aubergine Casserole), Lancashire hotpot (English), cassoulet (French), moussaka (Greek), and timballo (Italian).

In English-speaking Commonwealth countries like England, Australia, and New Zealand, the term casserole is most commonly used to refer to a dish of meat with vegetables (especially root vegetables) and a gravy-style sauce; dishes containing a large proportion of starchy ingredients, e.g., pasta or those cooked in creamy sauces are not generally referred to as casseroles, and might be called "bakes" or "gratins". In Britain they can be distinguished by saying stews are cooked on a stovetop while casseroles are cooked in an oven.

== See also ==
- Dutch oven
- Güveç
- Jugging
- List of baked goods
- List of casserole dishes
- List of cooking vessels
