= Comfort food =

Type of food that provides comfort

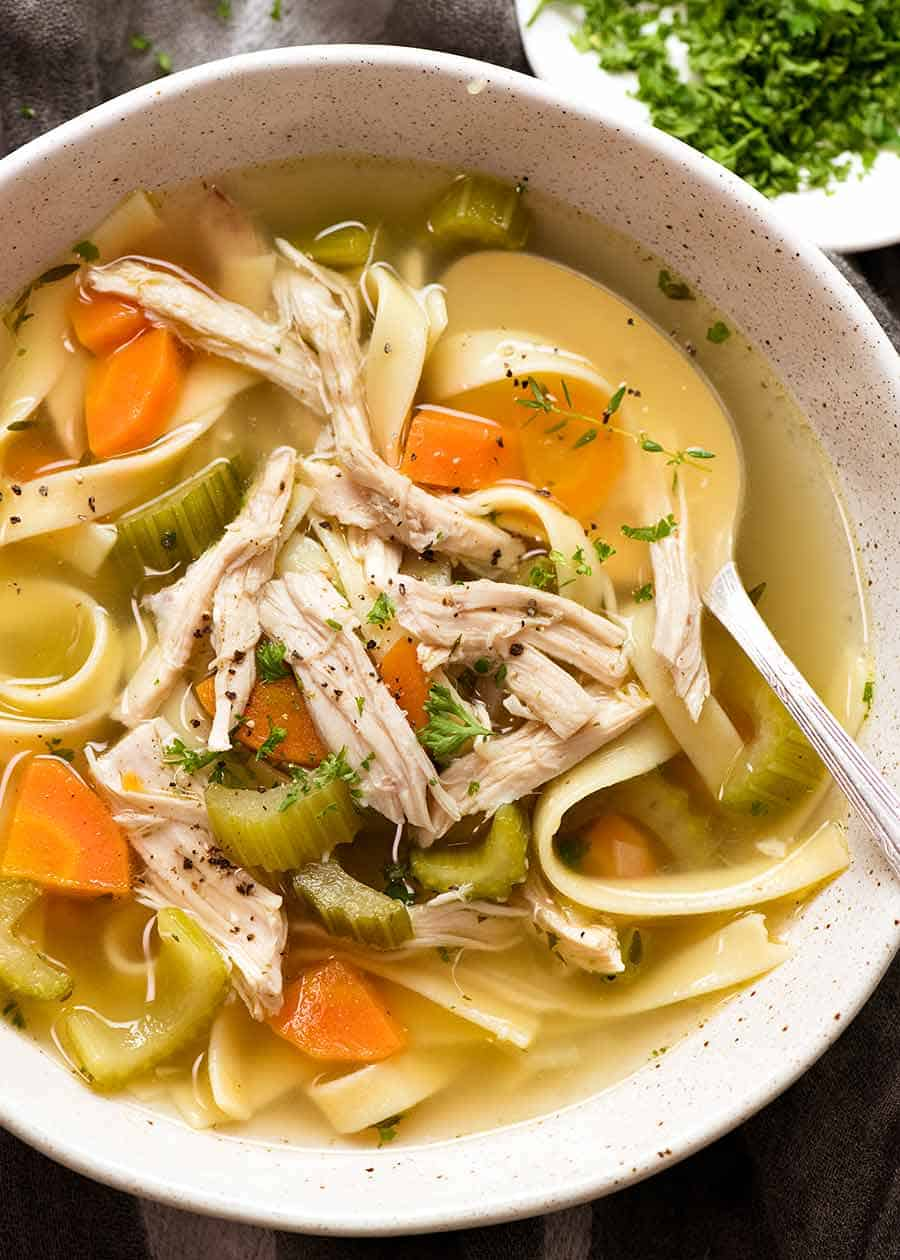
Chicken soup, a comfort food found in various cultures

Comfort food is food that provides the eater a nostalgic or sentimental value and may be characterized by its satisfying heartiness and association with childhood or home cooking. The nostalgia may be specific to an individual or it may apply to a specific culture.

== Definition and history ==
The term comfort food can be traced back at least to 1615, where in the beginning of the second part of Don Quixote, at the beginning of chapter one, Quixote's niece and her nurse are told to pamper him, "to give him things to eat which are comforting and appropriate for the heart and the brain ..." . Others trace it back to 1966, when the Palm Beach Post used it in a story: "Adults, when under severe emotional stress, turn to what could be called 'comfort food'—food associated with the security of childhood, like mother's poached egg or famous chicken soup." According to research by April White at JSTOR, it might have been Liza Minnelli who used the term for the first time in its modern meaning in an interview, admitting to craving a hamburger.

When the term first appeared, newspapers used it in quotation marks. In the 1970s, the most popular comfort food in the United States were various potato dishes and chicken soup, but even at the time, the definition varied from person to person. During the next decades, the nature of comfort food changed in the US, shifting from savory dishes to sweet ones, while comfort food themed cookbooks started to spread and restaurants started to offer items labelled as such, when originally the term was used for food items consumed "home alone". Worldwide diet trends emerging in the 1990s, like the low fat or the low-carb diet, were unable to end the cravings for comfort food. According to White, the COVID-19 pandemic that hit the world in 2020 further strengthened people's need for comfort food that evokes nostalgia and the feeling of belonging.

== Psychological studies ==
Consuming energy-dense, high calorie, high fat, salt or sugar foods, such as ice cream or french fries, may trigger the reward system in the human brain, which gives a distinctive pleasure or temporary sense of emotional elevation and relaxation. These feelings can also be induced by psychoactive ingredients found in other foods, such as coffee and chocolate. When psychological conditions are present, people often use comfort food to treat themselves. Those with negative emotions tend to eat unhealthy food in an effort to experience the instant gratification that comes with it, even if only short-lived.

One study divided college-students' comfort-food identifications into four categories (nostalgic foods, indulgence foods, convenience foods, and physical comfort foods) with a special emphasis on the deliberate selection of particular foods to modify mood or affect, and indications that the medical-therapeutic use of particular foods may ultimately be a matter of mood-alteration.

The identification of particular items as comfort food may be idiosyncratic, though patterns are detectable. In one study of American preferences, "males preferred warm, hearty, meal-related comfort foods (such as steak, casseroles, and soup) while females instead preferred comfort foods that were more snack related (such as chocolate and ice cream)”. In addition, younger people preferred more snack-related comfort foods compared to those over 55 years of age." The study also revealed strong connections between consumption of comfort foods and feelings of guilt.

Comfort food consumption is seen as a response to emotional stress and, consequently, as a key contributor to the epidemic of obesity in the United States. The provocation of specific hormonal responses leading selectively to increases in abdominal fat is seen as a form of self-medication.

Further studies suggest that consumption of comfort food is triggered in men by positive emotions, and by negative ones in women. The stress effect is particularly pronounced among college-aged women, with only 33% reporting healthy eating choices during times of emotional stress. For women specifically, these psychological patterns may be maladaptive.

A therapeutic use of these findings includes offering comfort foods or "happy hour" beverages to anorectic geriatric patients whose health and quality of life otherwise decreases with reduced oral intake.

Comfort foods provide emotional nutrition in the form of familiar tastes and a sense of security in stressful situations, but when taken in large quantities these foods become addictive and impair a person from engaging in new experiences or meeting challenges head-on. A reliance on comfort foods can stifle growth and transition, since the comfort foods are overused during times of transition and distress. The foods that people over-consume during stress periods leads to a state of emotional inertia where people may become resistant to necessary change or adaptation. This reliance on experience rather than interaction with present or upcoming situations eventually stifles the ability to thrive in fluid situations and inhibits the potential for personal growth.

== By region ==
A partial list by region of comfort foods around the world.

=== Afghanistan ===
Comfort foods in Afghanistan are:

- Aushak – stuffed dumplings and sauce
- Bolani – filled flatbread
- Borani Banjan or Borani-e-Banjan – baked eggplant with yogurt sauce
- Borani Kadoo or Borani-e-Kado – sweet and savory braised pumpkin with yogurt sauce
- Chainaki – lamb stew, traditionally served in a bowl lined with naan, and cooked in a clay vessel known as a chainak
- Chalaw or Challow – steamed rice with spices
- Kabuli palaw or Qabuli Pulao – steamed rice with raisins, carrots, and lamb
- Karahai – meat cooked in a traditional karahi pot
- Kebab – grilled skewered meat
- Korma Gosht or Qorma-e-Gosht – braised meat
- Mantu – meat-stuffed dumpling
- Naan – flatbread
- Sabzi Palu – spinach (sabzi) with spices
- Sher Berinj – rice pudding

=== Australia, New Zealand and South Africa ===
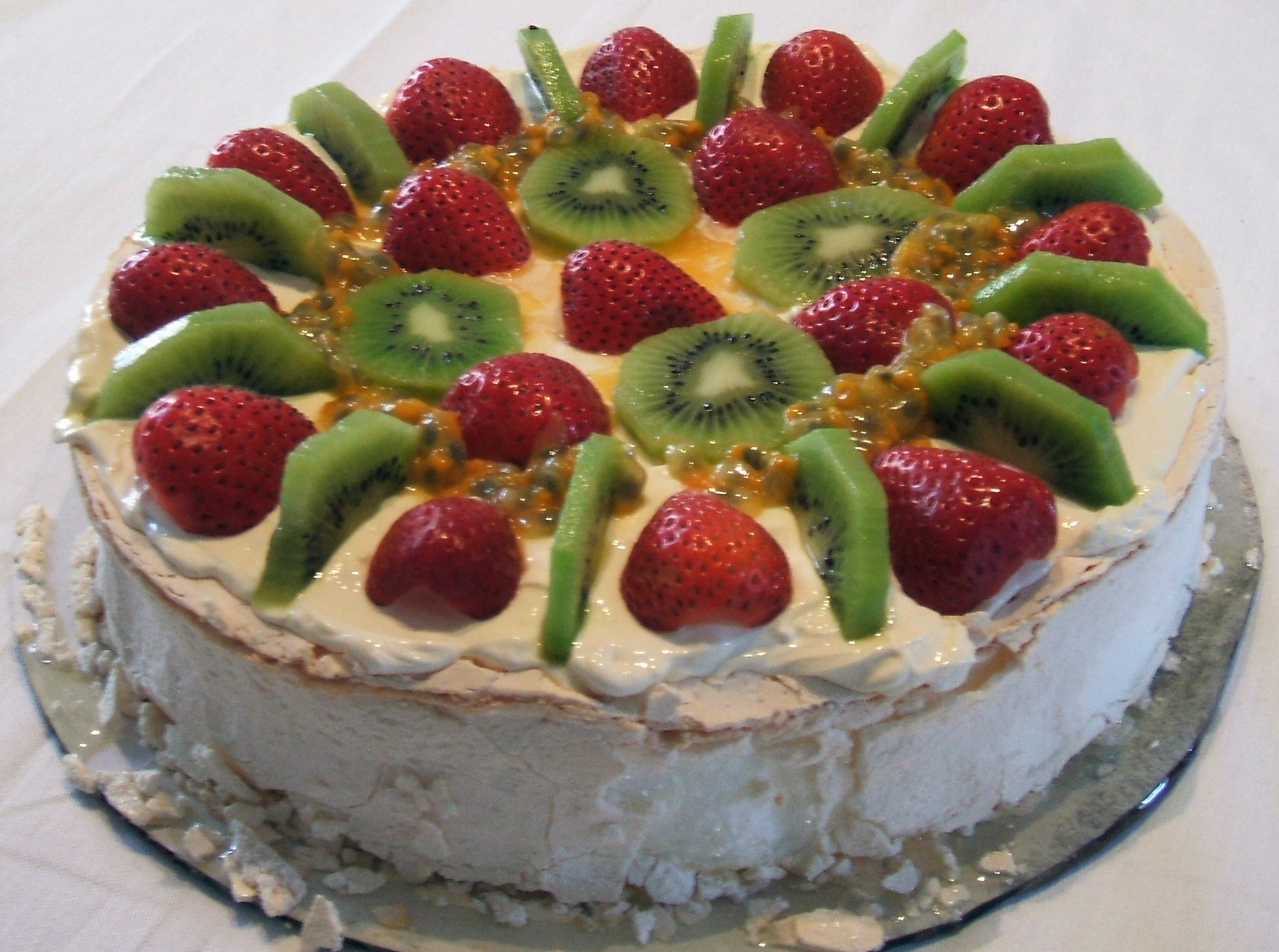
A Pavlova garnished with fruit and cream

Comfort foods in Australia, New Zealand and South Africa may include:

- Braised lamb shanks
- Bread and butter pudding
- Butterscotch apple dumplings
- Casserole (beef or chicken)
- Chicken soup
- Fish and Chips
- Golden syrup pikelets
- Honey and oat slices
- Hot chips
- Lamingtons
- Mashed potatoes
- Meat pie
- Pea and ham soup
- Pie floater
- Porridge, topped with brown sugar or honey, yogurt, nuts, and fruit
- Potato wedges
- Pumpkin soup
- Rice custard
- Roast meat (beef, chicken, or pork with crackling)
- Roast potatoes
- Sausage and mash
- Sausage roll
- Shepherd's pie
- Spaghetti
- Steak and kidney pie
- Sticky date pudding
- Vegemite or Marmite on toast

=== Austria ===
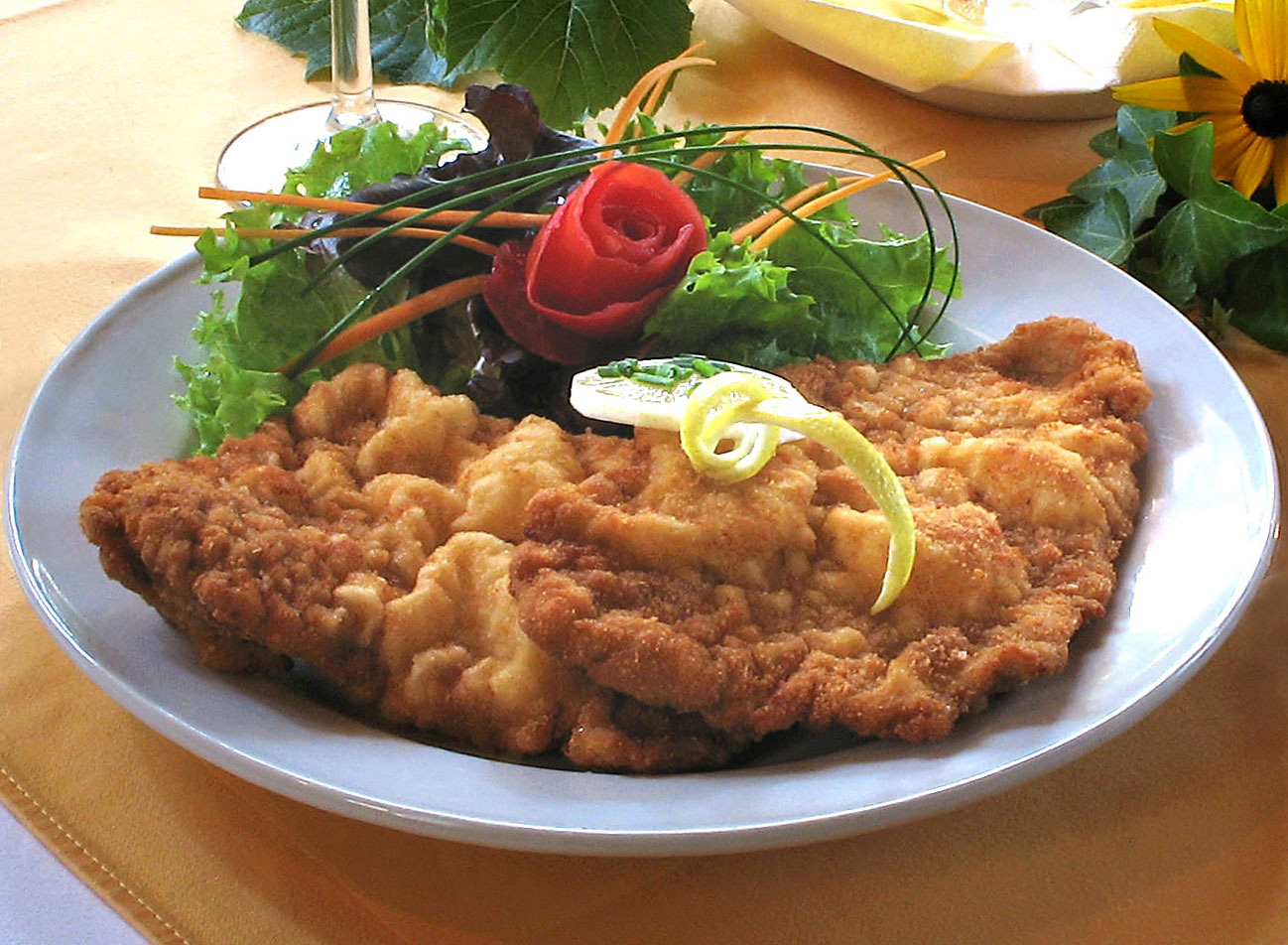
Wiener Schnitzel

Austrian (and especially Viennese) comfort foods may include the following foods:

- Apfelstrudel
- Fiakergulasch
- Fleischlaberln
- Frankfurter
- Frittatensuppe
- Grammelschmalz
- Grießnockerlsuppe
- Gulaschsuppe
- Käsekrainer
- Kaiserschmarrn
- Mannerschnitten
- Palatschinken
- Paprikahendl
- Sachertorte
- Schinkenfleckerln
- Schweinsbraten
- Topfenstrudel
- Wiener Schnitzel
- Zwetschkenknödel

=== Brazil ===
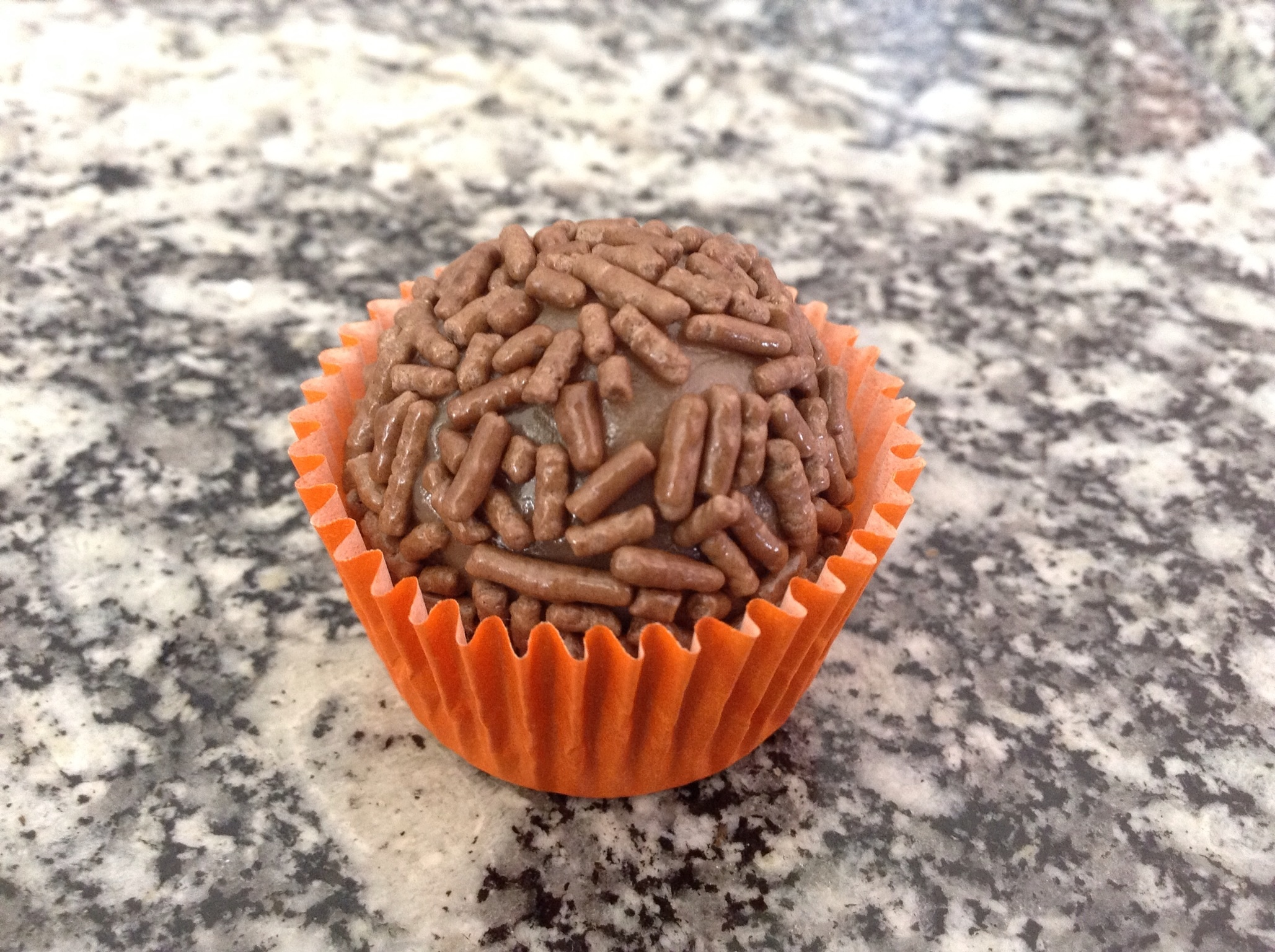
Brigadeiro, a truffle-like confection

- Açaí na tigela
- Arroz e feijão
- Baião de dois, a variation of the traditional rice and beans prepared with green beans
- Bobó de camarão
- Brigadeiro, a dessert common in children birthday parties
- Carne-de-sol
- Canjica
- Coxinha, a very popular chicken dumpling
- Churrasco
- Cuscuz
- Feijoada
- Flan
- Galinhada
- Moqueca
- Pão de queijo
- Virado

=== Canada ===
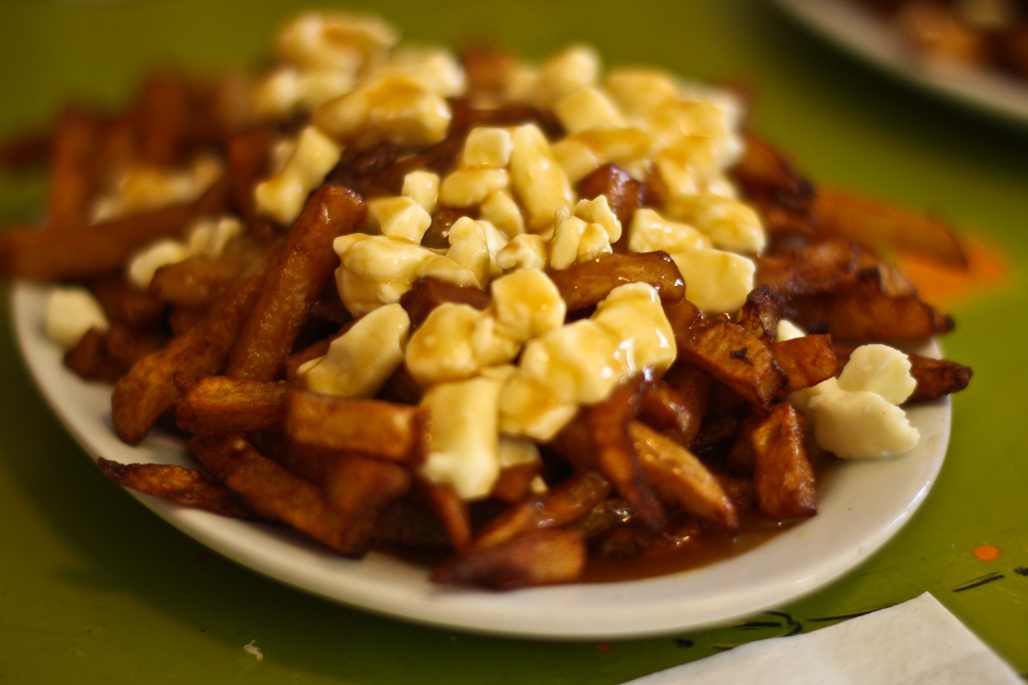
A plate of classic poutine at the Montreal restaurant La Banquise

- Butter tart / Tarte au sucre – small sweet tart-shaped pastries
- Cake
- Cheesecake
- Chili and beans
- Chocolate bars
- Cookies
- Fish and chips
- Fried chicken
- Fried rice
- Ginger beef
- Grilled cheese sandwich
- Hamburger
- Ice cream
- Lasagna
- Macaroni and cheese
- Nanaimo bar
- Pancakes with maple syrup
- Pea soup
- Pierogies
- Pizza
- Potatoes such as French fries, Hash browns, Mashed potatoes, Potato chips, and Potato salad
- Poutine
- Roast meat (beef, chicken, turkey or pork with crackling)
- Roast potatoes
- Rhubarb pie
- Sausage and mash
- Sausage roll
- Scrambled eggs on toast
- Shepherd's pie
- Spaghetti
- Steak and kidney pie
- Tourtière – meat pie with pork and lard

=== Egypt ===
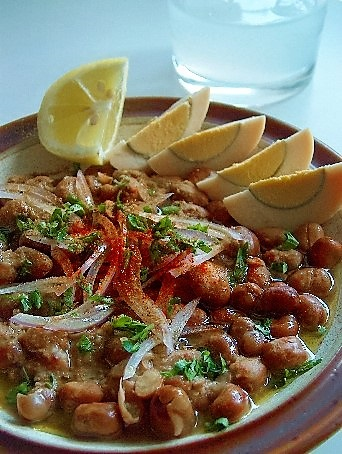
Ful medames served with hard-boiled eggs, a staple in Egypt

- Basbousa – sweet unleavened cake
- Falafel – fried bean ball
- Fatteh – meat soup on cooked rice with crisp flatbread with garlic sauce
- Ful medames – bean stew
- Hawawshi – pita bread stuffed with flavored meat
- Kushari – casserole of rice, macaroni, and vegetables
- Macarona béchamel – baked pasta dish with ground meat and béchamel sauce
- Sahlab – winter beverage from Orchis flour
- Mulukhiyah – soup or stew made with jute mallow leaves
- Om Ali – Pastry mixed with milk, nuts and sometimes coconut flakes topped with cream or butter and baked

=== France ===
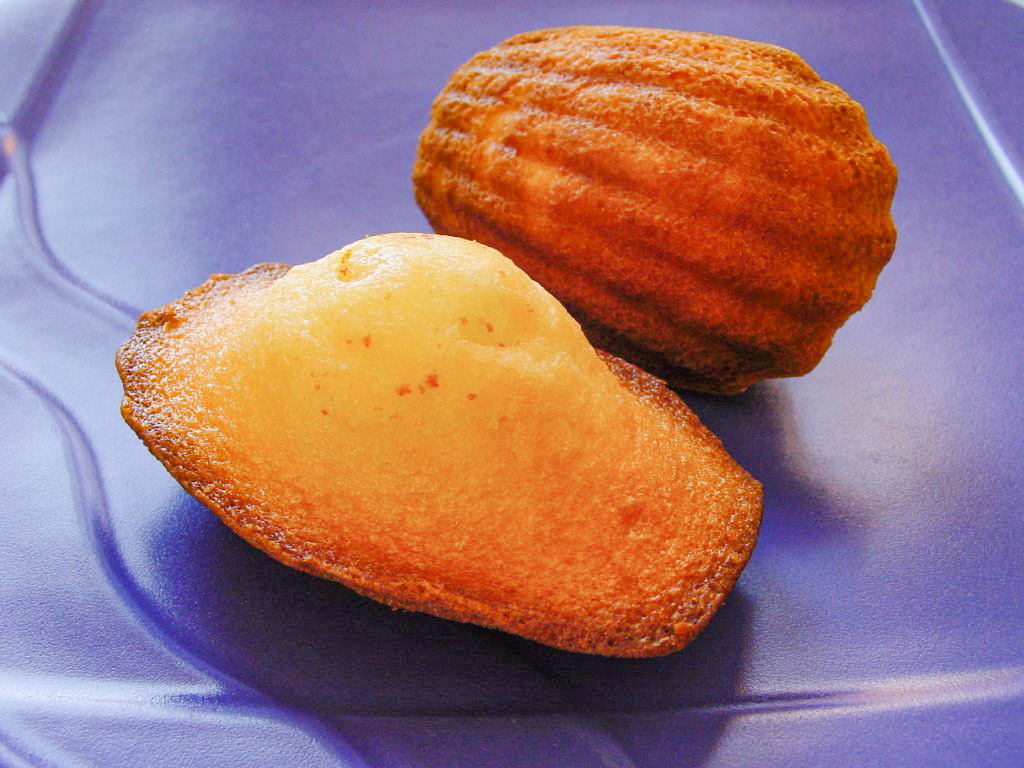
A madeleine. A madeleine de Proust is a French expression specifically referring to Marcel Proust's description of comfort food in In Search of Lost Time.

- Crème caramel – custard dessert
- French onion soup – onion soup with cheese and bread
- Gratin dauphinois – potato slices baked with cream
- Pâté – cold meat paste
- Pot-au-feu – beef stew

=== Germany ===
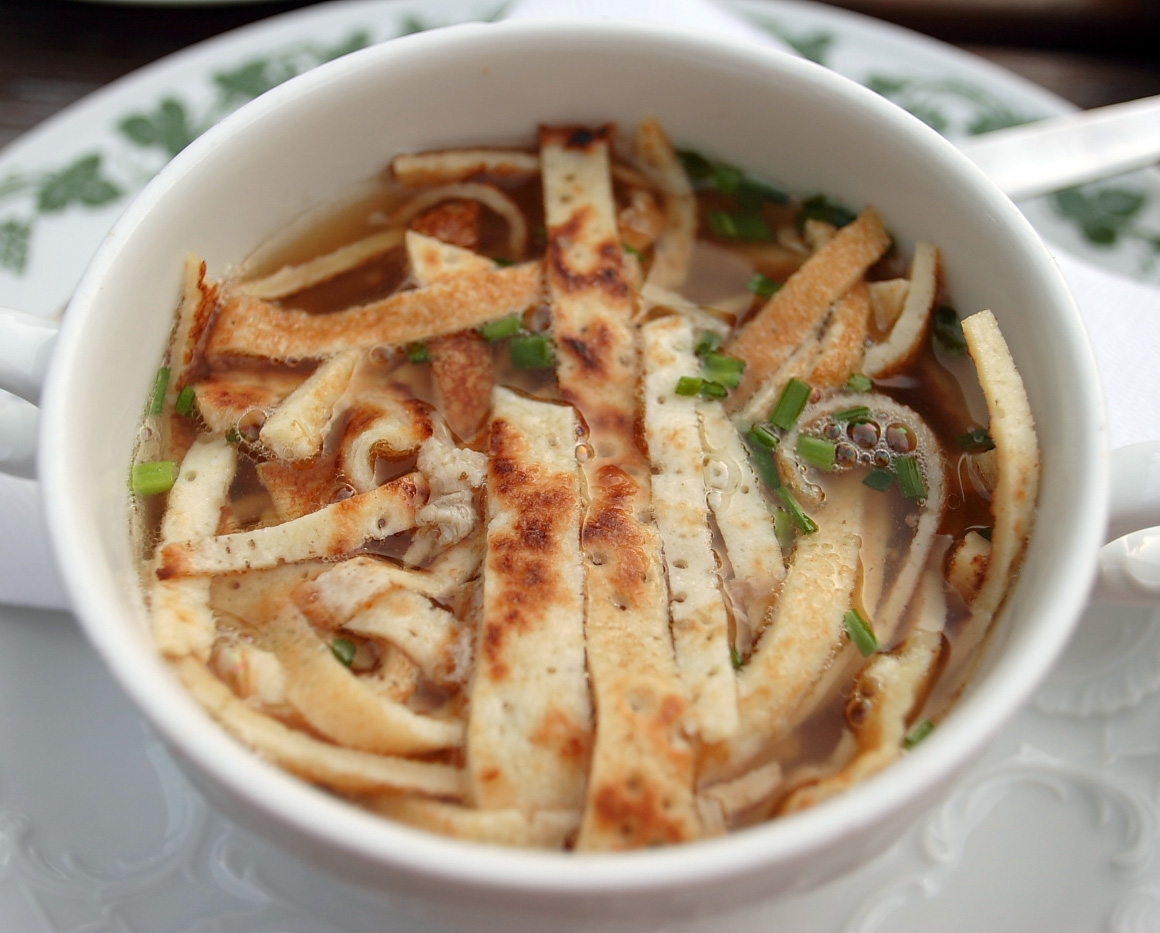
Flädlesuppe

German comfort foods may include the following foods:

- Arme Ritter
- Auszogne
- Bouletten, Frikadellen, Fleischpflanzerl etc.
- Bratkartoffeln
- Currywurst
- Flädlesuppe
- Fleischsalat
- Frankfurter
- Franzbrötchen
- Gaisburger Marsch
- Hamburger Aalsuppe
- Hamburger Labskaus
- Kartoffelpuffer
- Käsespätzle
- Klöße
- Kohlrouladen
- Leberkäse
- Laugenbrezn, Laugengebäck
- Maultaschen
- Mett
- Münchner Weißwürscht
- Nürnberger Lebkuchen
- Nürnberger Rostbratwurst
- Obazda
- Pichlstoana
- Regensburger
- Rote Grütze
- Rindsrouladen
- Sauerbraten
- Saumagen
- Schwäbische Spätzle
- Schlachtplatte
- Schnitzel
- Schweinshaxn
- Spanferkel
- Steckerlfisch
- Schweinsbraten

=== Greece ===
- Gemista – stuffed vegetables
- Gyros – sliced rotisserie meat wrapped in flatbread
- Keftedakia – meatballs
- Koulourakia – butter cookies
- Moussaka – baked eggplant or potato dish
- Pastitsio – baked pasta dish with minced meat and béchamel sauce
- Dolmadakia – stuffed leaves
- Souvlaki – meat on a skewer

=== Hong Kong ===
- Baked pork chop rice– a type of Hong Kong-style western cuisine
- Cart noodle – an à la carte noodle dish traditionally sold using carts
- Cha Chaan Teng – a Hong Kong style place to eat comfort food
- Dim Sum – small bite-sized portions of food served in small steamer baskets during yum cha
- Egg Tart
- Hotpot
- Macaroni in broth – a type of Hong Kong-style western cuisine
- Pineapple Bun – a type of pastry that resembles a pineapple
- Put chai ko – a palm-sized pudding cake snack
- Siu Mei (including char siu) – meats roasted on spits over an open fire or in a large rotisserie oven

=== Hungary ===
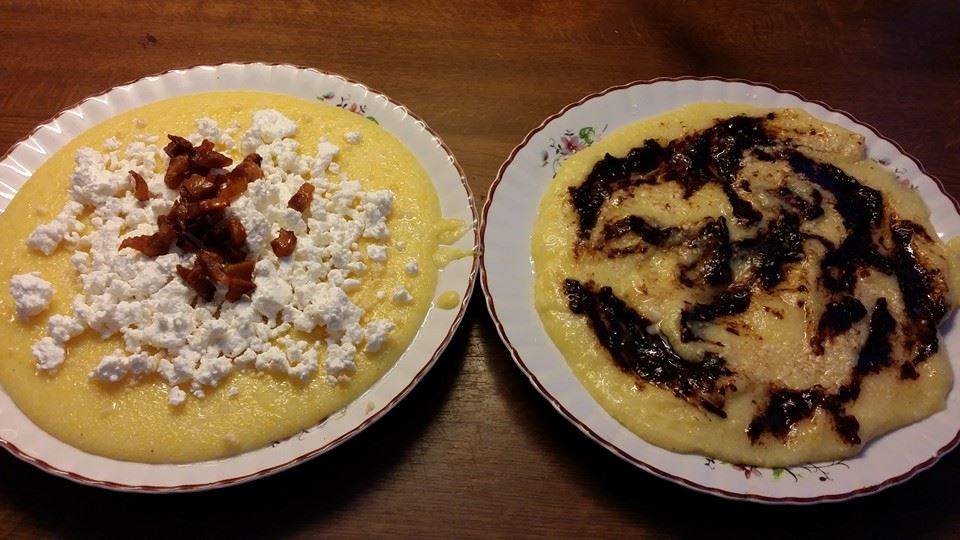
Puliszka with curd cheese and smoked lard (left) and plum preserve (right)

- Aranygaluska – dough balls rolled in a mixture of sugar and crushed nuts
- Goulash soup
- Chicken soup
- Lángos – yeast dough deep fried in oil with various toppings
- Madártej – meringue floating on crème anglaise
- Chicken paprikash
- Paprikás krumpli – potato stew with paprika
- Pörkölt – meat stew with paprika
- Puliszka – polenta with toppings
- Rántott hús – a type of Snitzel; but also fried chicken is called the same way
- Tejbegríz – Semolina pudding
- Tojásos nokedli – small, plump soft noodles with eggs

=== India ===
India's cuisine is diverse. Some Indian comfort foods – regional and subcontinent-wide – are listed below.

- Biryani – mutton, chicken or lamb
- Chaat – savoury snacks
- Curd rice – rice mixed with yogurt
- Curry
- Cutlet – deep-fried fritter of meat or vegetables
- Dal chawal – spiced lentils and rice, particularly in North India
- Fish fry
- Kachori – spicy stuffed pastry from Rajasthan
- Kadhi chawal – curd curry with rice
- Kati roll – meat wrapped in flatbread, street food from West Bengal
- Maach-bhaat – fish with rice, from Bengal
- Momo – steamed filled dumpling
- Sambar – lentil-based vegetable stew
- Samosa – triangular pastry with a savory filling
- Puri – fried flatbread
- Masala Dosa – rice crepes, with or without a filling of potatoes and onion
- Khichdi – stew made with rice and legumes (lentils, mung beans)
- Pav bhaji – curry served with buttered buns
- Radhaballavi – deep-fried flatbread with a filling
- Rajma chawal – rice with beans
- Rasam and Curd rice – particularly in South India
- Vada pav – potato dumpling inside a bread bun, especially in Maharashtra

=== Indonesia ===
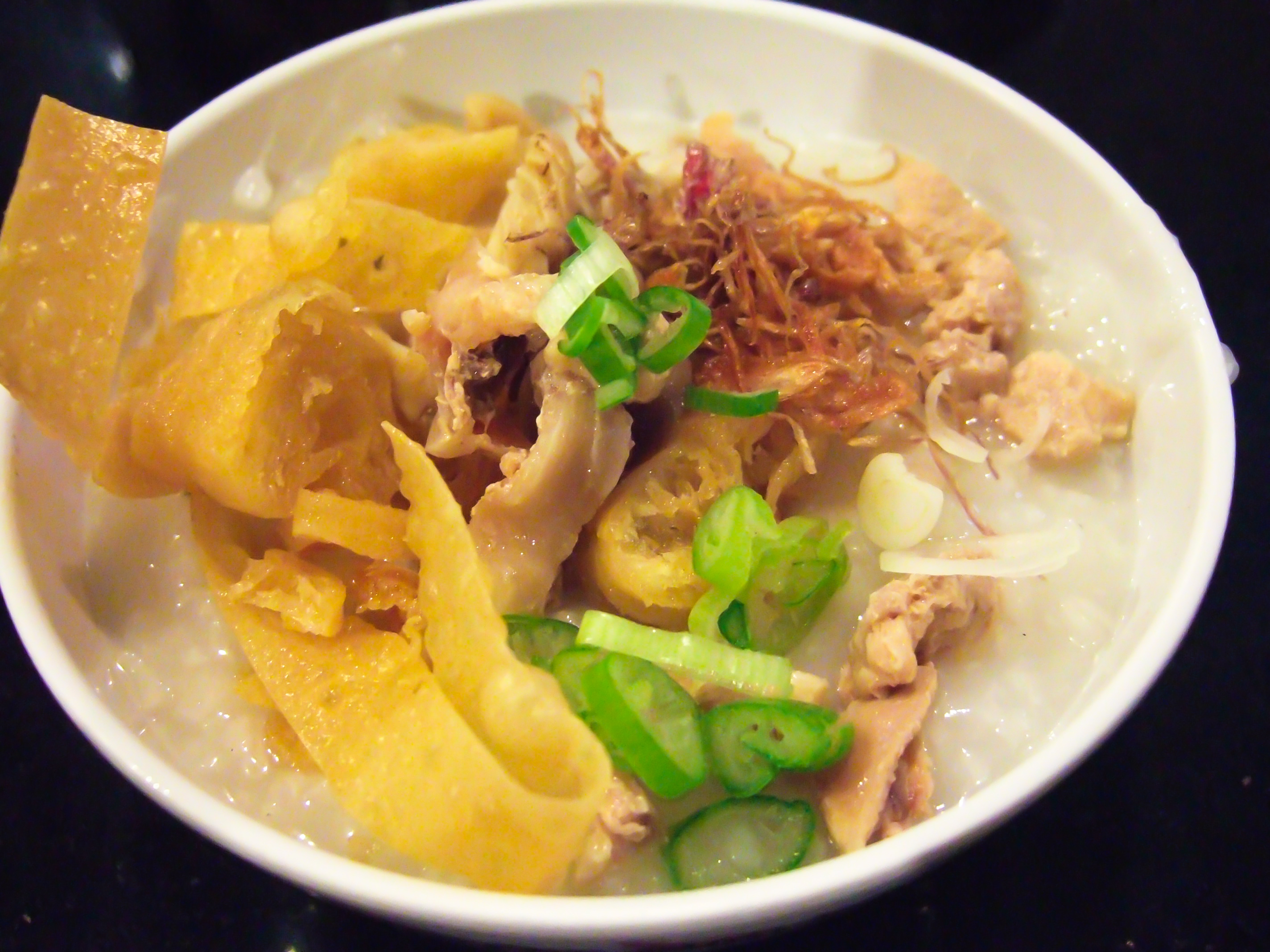
Bubur ayam (chicken congee) is an Indonesian comfort food.

Some popular Indonesian foods are considered to be comfort food, usually served hot or warm, and either soupy or with a soft texture. Most of them are high in carbs or fat, such as congee, fried rice, and noodles which are high in carbs; while meatballs and grilled skewered meats contain fair amounts of fat and salt. Comfort foods often are the kind of food that provides nostalgic sentiments, as they often called masakan rumahan (home cooking) or masakan ibu (mother's dishes). In Indonesia, the warm and soft texture of bubur ayam is believed to help people to recover during convalescence. Sayur sop or sup ayam is Indonesian chicken soup that often sought during flu. The warm soup contains chunk of chicken, bits of potato, carrot, and common green bean served in chicken stock.

Some are traditional Indonesian food and some are derived from Chinese influences. Indonesian comfort foods include:

- Bakmi or mie ayam – noodles (mi) with pork (bak) or chicken (ayam)
- Bakso – meatball soup
- Bubur ayam – chicken congee
- Gado-gado – salad containing vegetables, tempeh and egg in peanut sauce
- Mie goreng – fried noodle; for some Indonesians, especially those who are abroad, this may include a favourite brand or type of Indonesian instant noodles such as Indomie's "Mi goreng" line
- Nasi goreng – fried rice
- Nasi tim – steamed chicken rice
- Sayur sop or sup ayam – Indonesian chicken and vegetables soup
- Sate – skewered barbecue with peanut sauce
- Soto ayam – spicy chicken soup

=== Ireland ===
Irish comfort food can include:

- Bangers and mash – sausages and mashed potatoes
- Coddle – meat and vegetable stew
- Colcannon – mashed potatoes with cabbage
- Fish and chips
- Full Irish breakfast
- Irish stew
- Shepherd's pie – casserole of minced meat topped with mashed potatoes
- Soda bread
- Spice bag – chipped potatoes with spices
- 3-in-1 – egg-fried rice, chips, and curry sauce

=== Italy ===
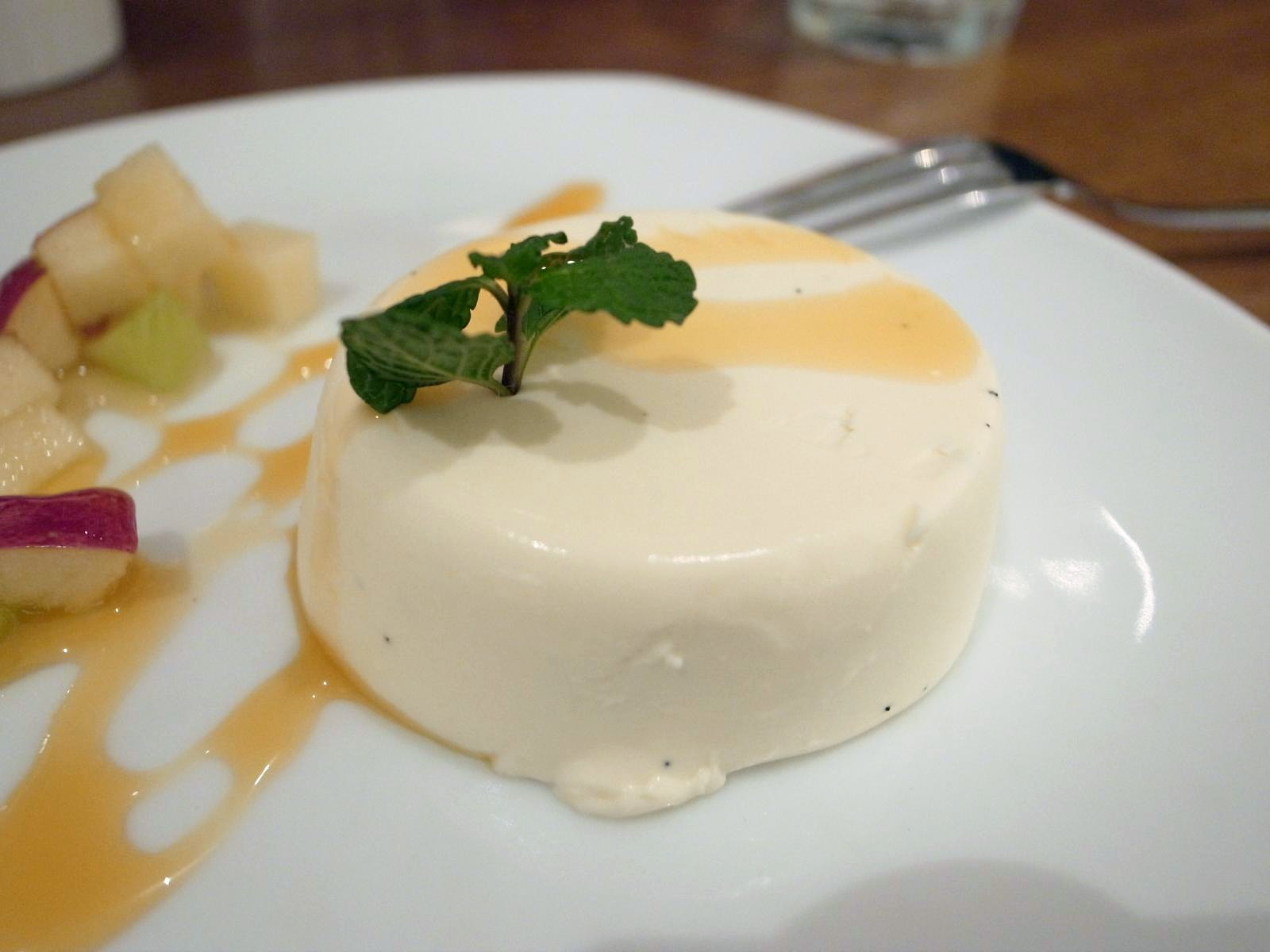
Panna cotta

- Bruschetta
- Cacciucco – fish stew
- Crostini – small toasted bread slices with toppings
- Gnocchi – small soft dough dumplings
- Lasagne – flat noodles (pasta) layered with meat, cheese and tomato sauce
- Pasta all'amatriciana – pasta with guanciale, tomato sauce and pecorino cheese
- Pasta alla carbonara – pasta with egg, guanciale, and pecorino cheese
- Nutella – sweet spread of cocoa and hazelnuts
- Panna cotta – sweetened cream thickened with gelatin
- Pizza – baked flatbread with toppings
- Porchetta – boneless pork roast
- Risotto

=== Japan ===
In Japan, there is an expression called "Taste of Mom(おふくろの味)".

- Curry Rice/Kare Raisu – Stewed vegetables – most commonly potato, onion, and carrot – in a mild curry sauce, sometimes with meat
- Chazuke/ochazuke – rice with green tea
- Miso soup – soybean-flavored clear soup
- Mochi – rice cake
- Onigiri – rice ball
- Ramen – soup with thin noodles
- Takoyaki – octopus balls
- Tempura – battered, deep-fried pieces of meat or vegetables
- Udon – soup with thick noodles
- Tamago kake gohan – cooked rice topped with raw egg

=== Lithuania ===
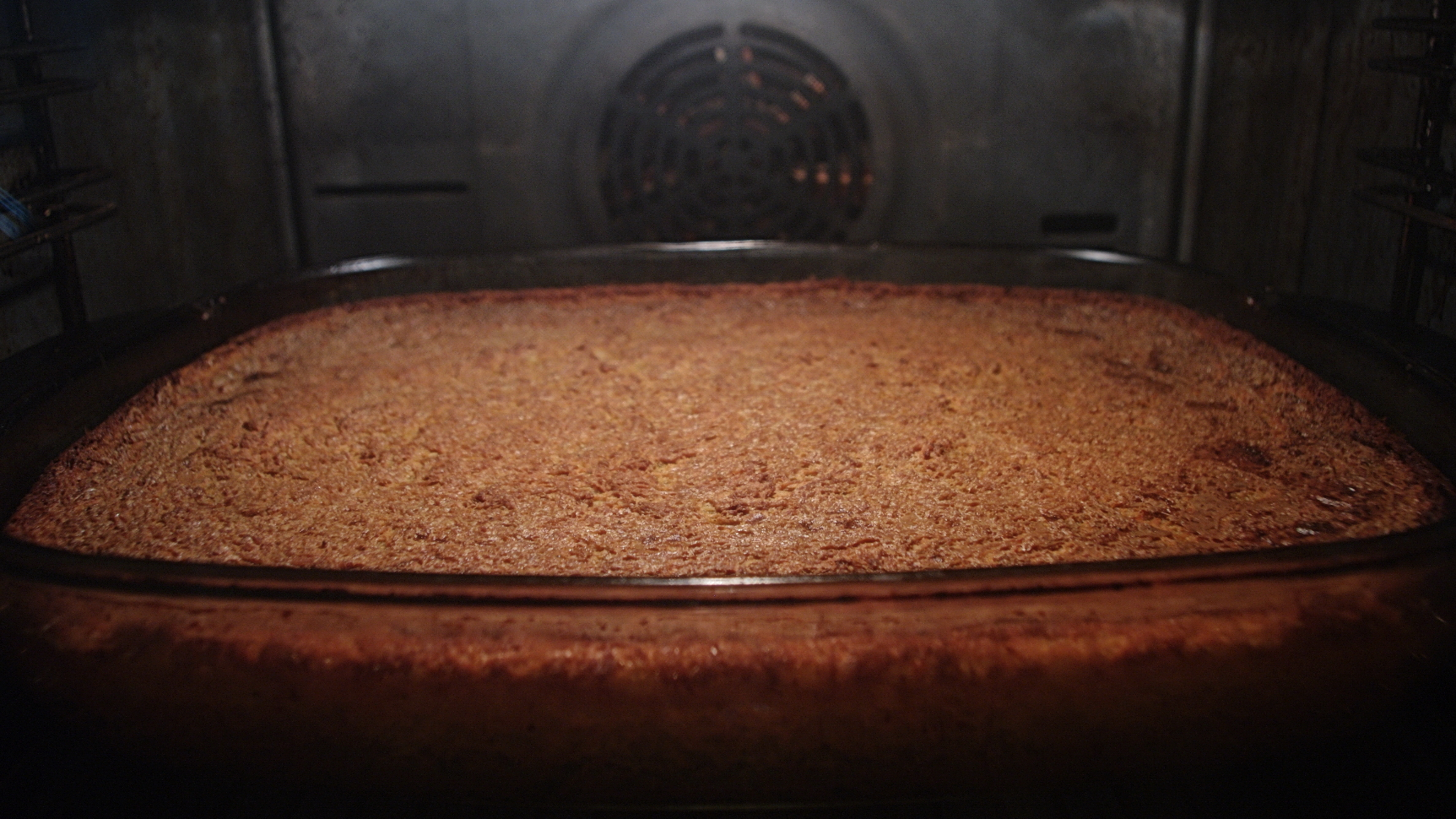
Kugelis

- Balandėliai – cabbage rolls
- Bulviniai blynai
- Cepelinai – potato dumplings
- Curd doughnuts
- Honey cake
- Kepta duona – fried garlic rye bread
- Koldūnai – flour-based dumplings
- Kugelis – potato casserole
- Kūčiukai – Christmas Eve poppy seed biscuits
- Mushroom cookies
- Napoleon cake
- Tinginys – chocolate salami
- Varškėčiai – curd pancakes or dumplings
- White salad – boiled vegetable and mayonnaise salad

=== Philippines ===
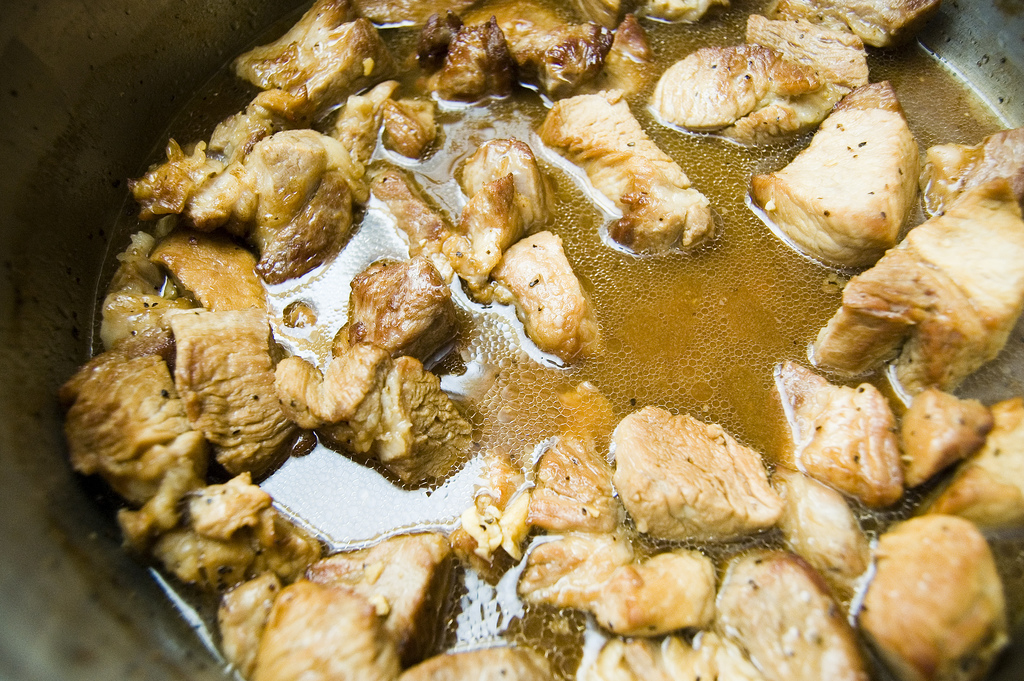
Pork adobo

- Adobo – A salt and vinegar marinated meat stew, with a large amount of local and regional variations.
- Arroz Caldo / Lugaw – A thick, savory rice porridge, often served as breakfast, on rainy days, or when sick.
- Batchoy – A noodle soup with a variety of meats.
- Filipino spaghetti - Sweet and savory spaghetti
- Ginataan – A coconut cream-based dessert soup with candied banana, sticky rice balls, sagó (tapioca balls), taro, and langkâ (jackfruit).
- Bulalo – A beef bone marrow soup.
- Champorado – Chocolate rice porridge, sometimes served savory (as with tuyô)
- Dinuguan - A pork blood and offal stew.
- Halo-halo – A cold, crushed ice dessert dish of mixed sweets in fruits, with milk and topped with ice cream and leche flan.
- Kare-kare – A stew of ox tripe and oxtail in a peanut sauce. It is regarded as a local variant of Indian curry.
- Lumpia – Fried or fresh spring rolls with vegetable or meat filling.
- Lomi – A hot noodle soup with distinctly thick egg noodles.
- Pancit – A class of noodles, almost always fried or stir-fried, and often served during birthday celebrations.
- Puto – Steamed rice cakes
- Sinampalukan - Sour, tamarind-based chicken soup
- Sinigang – A classification of sour soups with different configurations of meats, vegetables, and souring agents.
- Sopas - A creamy soup (usually made with chicken) with elbow macaroni.
- Suman – Another type of glutinous rice cake
- Tsokolate – Hot chocolate drink made with cacao, served with or without milk.

=== Poland ===
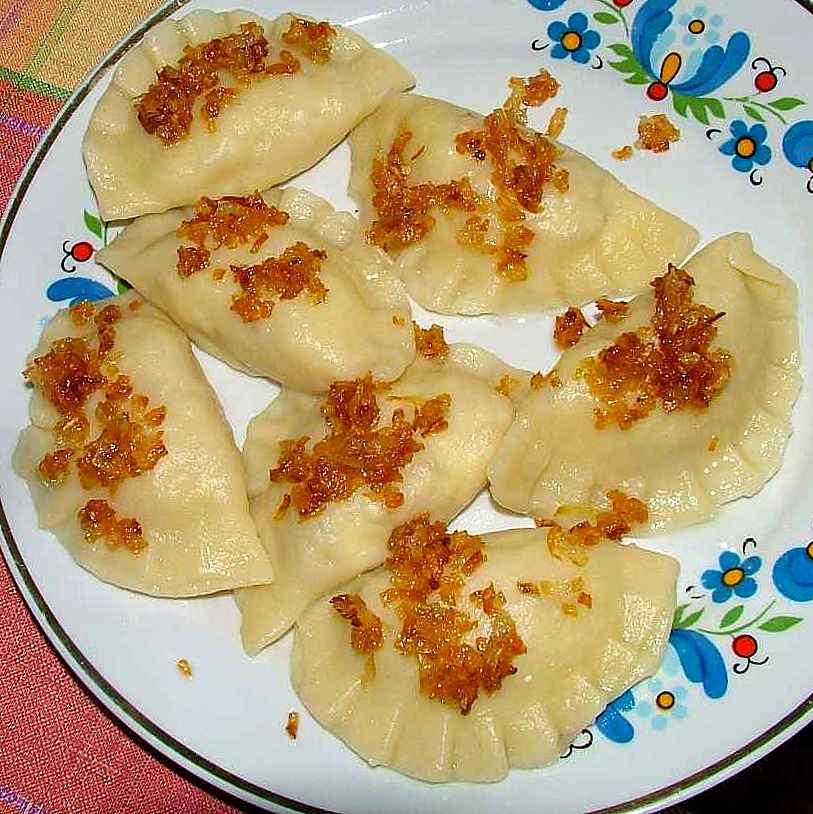
Steamed pierogi, with fried onions on top

Some Polish comfort food include:

- Soups and stews
  - Bigos – "hunters' stew"
  - Barszcz z uszkami – a variant of borscht, a clear beetroot soup with forest mushrooms dumplings
  - Gulasz – goulash / meat and vegetable stew
  - Kapuśniak – sour cabbage soup (sauerkraut soup)
  - Rosół – chicken soup with fine noodles
  - Zupa grzybowa – wild mushroom soup
  - Zupa ogórkowa – sour cucumber soup
  - Zupa pomidorowa – clear tomato soup with rice or noodles
  - Zupa szczawiowa – sorrel soup served with boiled egg
  - Żurek – sour rye soup
- Budyń waniliowy z malinami – vanilla pudding with raspberries
- Kotlet schabowy – pork schnitzel
- Golonka – stewed or roasted ham hock
- Kopytka – small potato dumpling
- Łazanki – large flat noodles with fried sauerkraut
- Makaron ze śmietaną i truskawkami – pasta with cream and strawberries
- Naleśniki z twarogiem – pancakes with milk curd
- Pierogi – filled dumplings
- Placki ziemniaczane – potato pancakes
- Sernik – baked cheesecake
- Śledź w oleju – pickled herring
- Zasmażana kapusta - braised sauerkraut
- Zapiekanka – toasted open-face sandwich

=== Portugal ===
- Açorda
- Bacalhau à Brás
- Bacalhau à Gomes de Sá
- Bacalhau à Zé do Pipo
- Bacalhau com natas
- Caldeirada
- Caldo verde
- Cozido à portuguesa
- Feijoada
- Tripas à moda do Porto

=== Puerto Rico ===
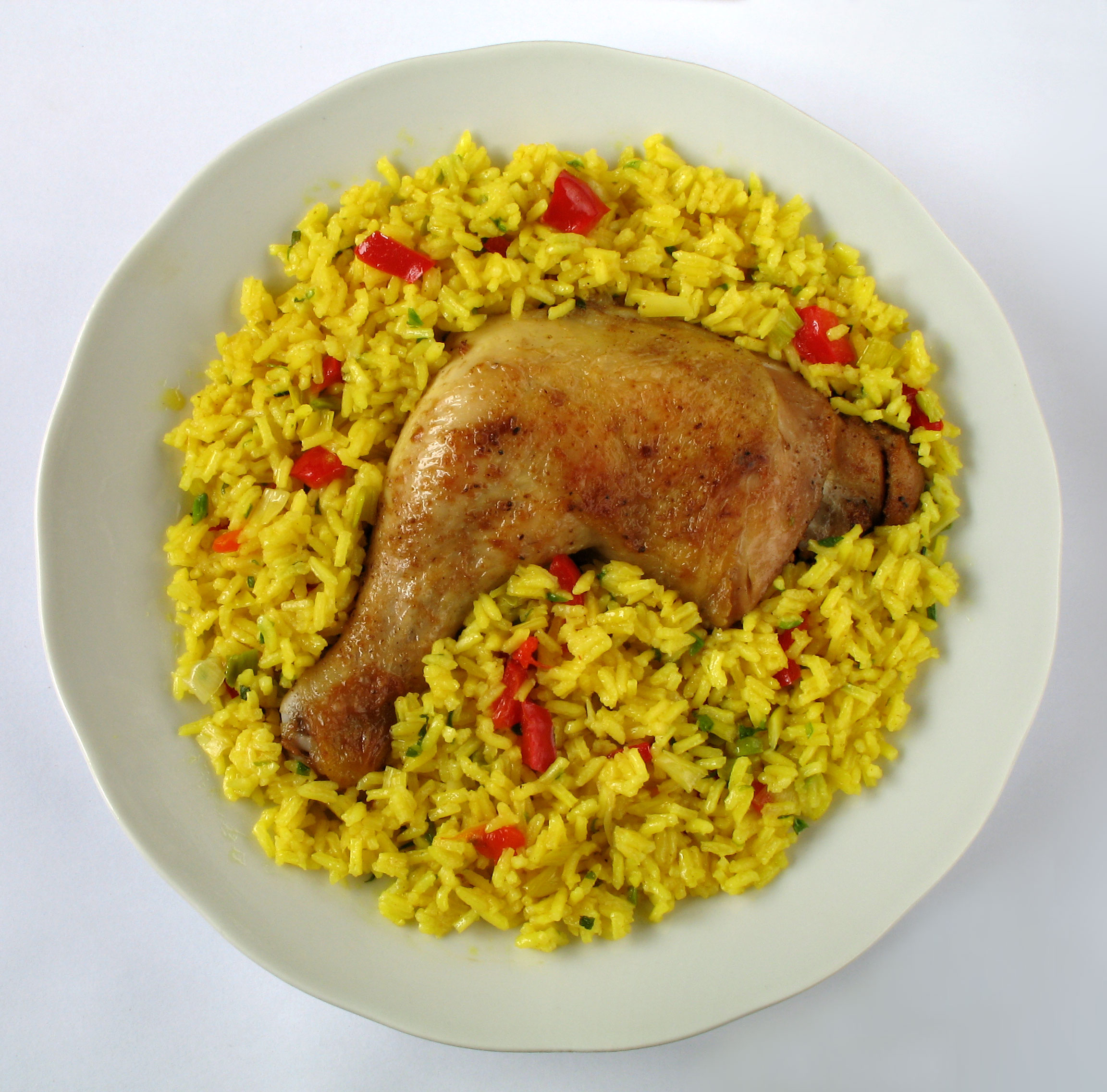
Arroz con pollo: chicken with rice

Some Puerto Rican comfort foods include:

- Arroz con gandules – rice with pigeon peas
- Arroz con pollo – rice with chicken
- Bistec encebollado – steak and onions
- Carne Guisada – stewed beef
- Carne mechada – Puerto Rican style meatloaf
- Churrasco – grilled flank or skirt steak
- Cuchifritos and Fritanga – assortments of fried appetizers (alcapurrias, bacalaitos, pastelitos/pastelillos, piononos, sorullos/sorullitos)
- Habichuelas guisadas con calabaza – beans stewed with pumpkin
- Lechón asado – roast pork
- Mixta – white rice, stewed beans with pumpkin and stewed meat with potatoes and carrots
- Mofongo and trifongo – fried mashed green plantains
- Mofongo relleno de mariscos, carne o pollo – Fried mashed green plantains stuffed with seafood, meat or chicken
- Pasteles – Puerto Rican tamales
- Pastelón de plátano maduro – ripe banana casserole with ground beef and cheddar cheese
- Pinchos – Puerto Rican skewers
- Tostones – fried plantain slices

=== Romania ===
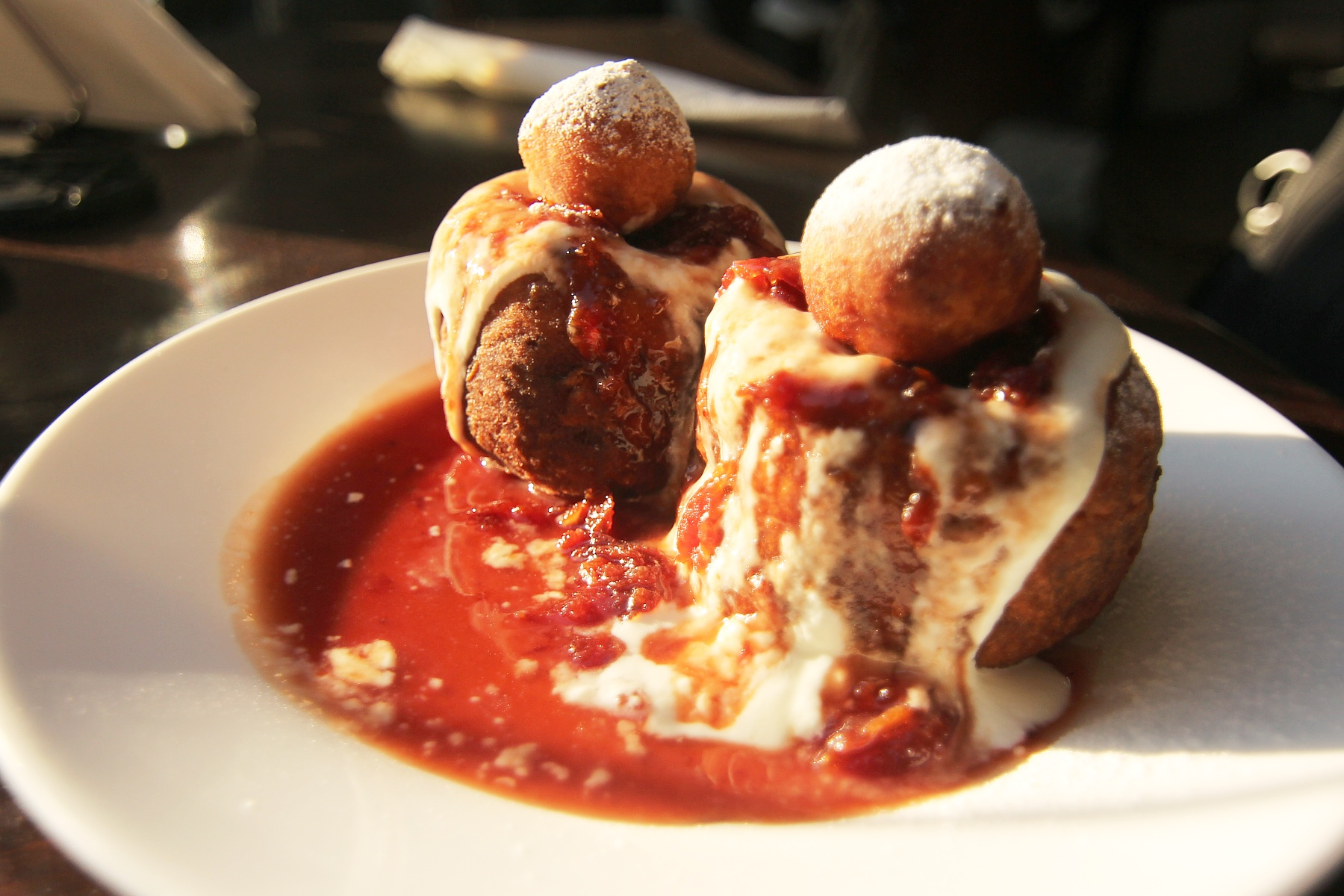
Papanași

Romanian comfort foods may include:

- Brânzoaică – soft cake filled with sweet cheese
- Chocolate salami – dessert made from cocoa, broken biscuits and butter
- Ciorbă de perișoare – sour soup with meatballs
- Cozonac – sweet yeast dough
- Greta Garbo cake – sheets of dough, filled with fruit jam and glazed with chocolate
- Mititei – grilled ground meat rolls
- Papanași – traditional fried or boiled pastry
- Roasted eggplant salad – chopped roasted eggplants
- Salată de boeuf – chopped beef and root vegetables
- Sarmale – stuffed cabbage leaves
- Stuffed peppers – hollowed peppers filled with meat and rice

=== Russia ===
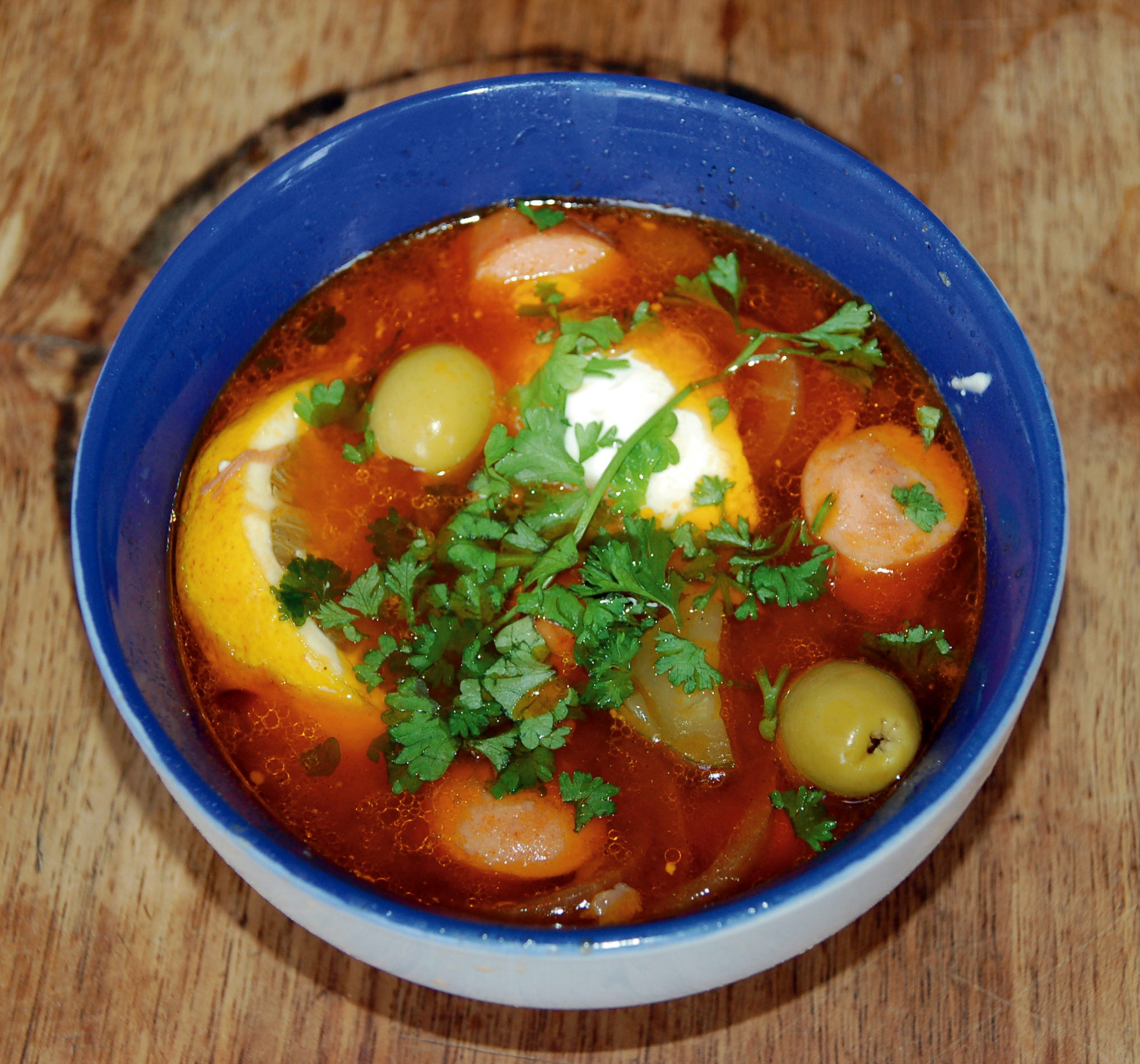
Solyanka

Russian comfort foods may include:

- Bliny – pancakes or crepes
- Borscht
- Dressed herring – layered herring salad
- Golubtsy – cabbage rolls
- Kasha – porridge
- Kotlety – meatballs
- Kholodets – savory gelatin
- Kulebyaka - a fish pie
- Kvass – fermented drink made with bread
- Napoleon – layered cake with layers of pastry and cream
- Okroshka – cold vegetable soup
- Oladyi – small thick pancakes or fritters
- Olivier salad – mayo, sausage and vegetable salad
- Pelmeni – meat-filled dumpling
- Pirozhki – buns with various fillings
- Rassolnik – soup with pickles
- Shashlik – skewered and grilled cubes of meat
- Shchi – predominantly cabbage soup
- Solyanka – spicy and sour soup
- Syrniki – cottage cheese pancakes
- Ukha – fish-based clear soup
- Vareniki – filled dumplings (see pierogi for Poland)
- Vinegret – a salad made of diced vegetables, normally sour
- Zakuski – an array of dishes to supplement main courses

=== Singapore ===
- Kaya toast—toast with sweet coconut jam and cold butter, commonly served with coffee and soft-boiled eggs
- Milo—chocolate flavoured malt drink
- Hainanese chicken rice
- Bak kut teh—pork ribs dish cooked in broth

=== South Korea ===
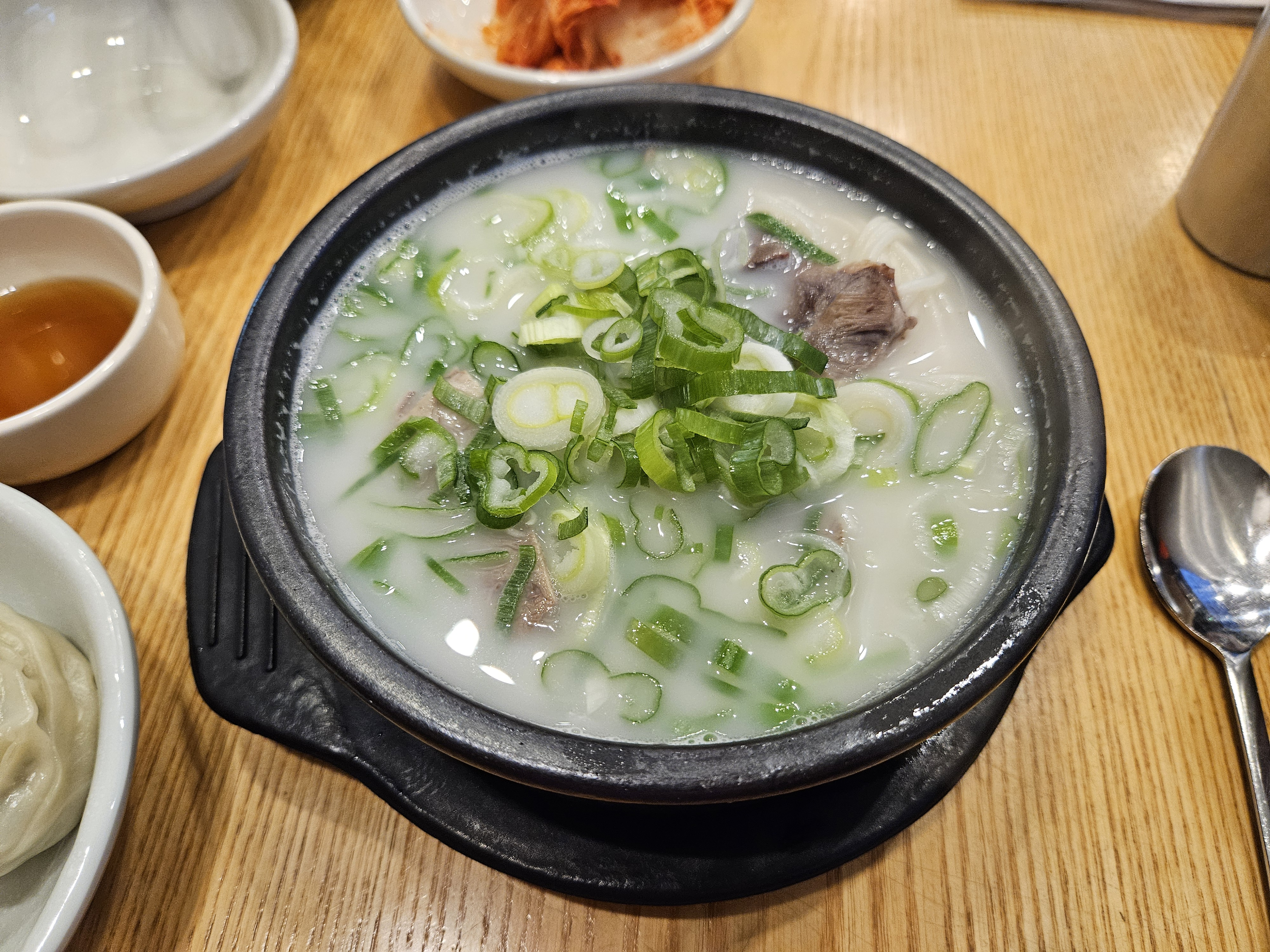
Seolleongtang

- Tteokbokki – rice cakes in spicy chili stew
- Kimbap – cooked rice rolled in seaweed and stuffed with vegetables or meat
- Samgyeopsal – roasted pork belly
- Mandu – dumplings with various fillings
- Soups and stews
  - Kimchi jjigae – spicy stew made with kimchi
  - Haejang-guk – vegetables and meat in beef broth
  - Sundubu-jjigae – soft tofu stew
  - Seolleongtang – ox bone soup
  - Budae-jjigae – "army stew" with noodles, Spam, vegetables and other ingredients
  - Kalguksu – soup with handmade noodles

=== Spain ===
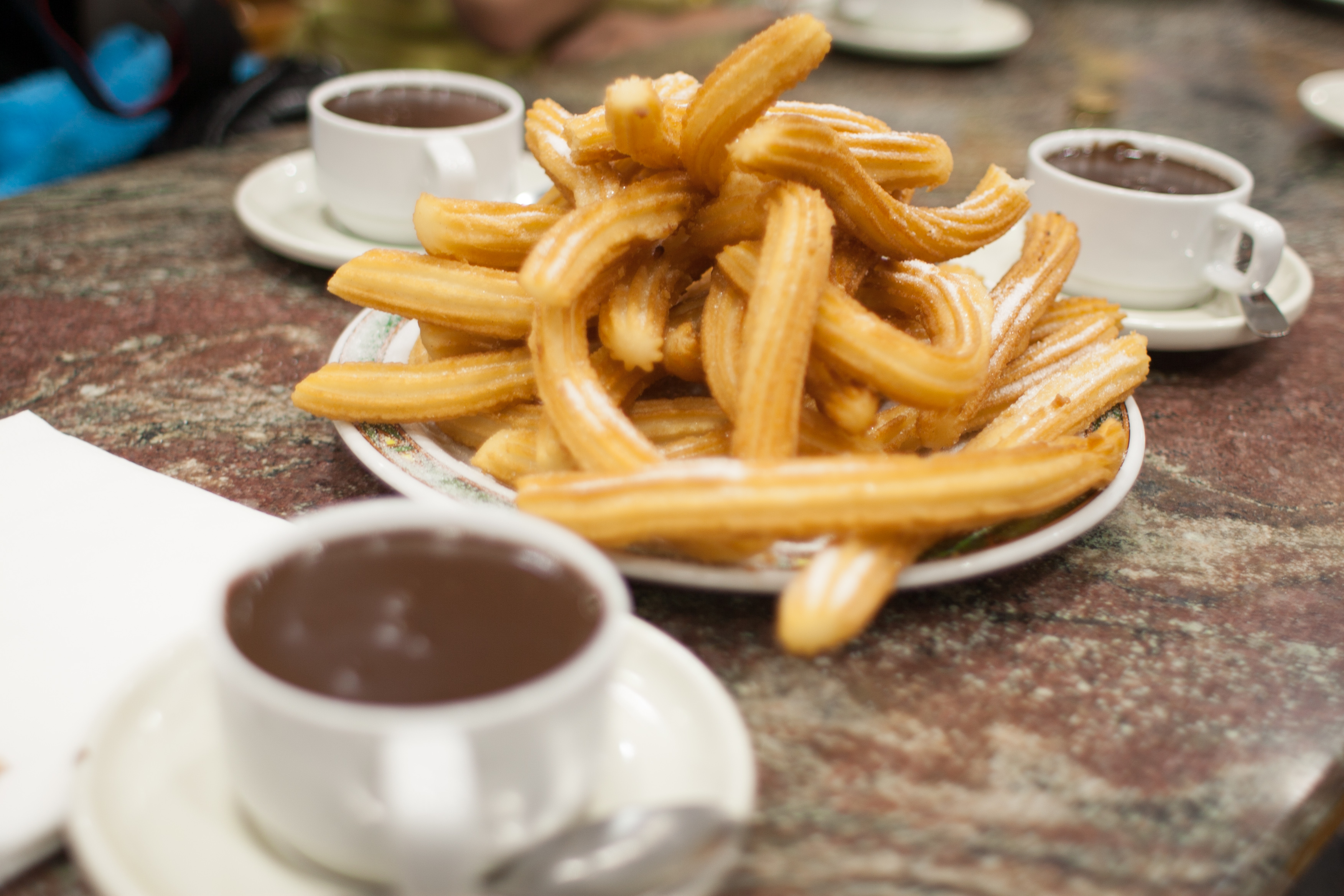
Chocolate con churros

- Castañas asadas – roasted chestnuts
- Chocolate con churros – hot chocolate drink with fried dough
- Savoury coca
- Mar y montaña ("Sea and Mountain") dishes, which combine meat and seafood
- Embutido, a generic name for different kinds of cured pork meat, including fuet (a characteristic type of dried sausage), salchichón or longaniza (salami) and different kinds of cold cut botifarra.
- Fried seafood, such as boquerones fritos (fried anchovies) and calamares fritos (fried squid)
- Jamón serrano – Serrano ham
- Pan tumaca (bread smeared with tomato and olive oil, and sometimes garlic)
- Aioli (sauce which is an emulsion of garlic and olive oil. The name literally means "garlic and oil" in Catalan)
- Catalan-style cod (with raisins and pine nuts)
- Escalivada (various grilled vegetables)
- Escudella y carne de la olla (a broth, it may be served as soup with pasta and minced meats and vegetables, or as the soup first and then the rest)
- Canelones (Cannelloni with a bechamel sauce)
- Fricandó
- Esqueixada (salted cod salad with tomato and onion)
- Judías con botifarra (beans and pork sausage)
- Suquet (a seafood casserole)
- Calçot (specially cultivated onion, grilled and served as a "Calçotada")
- Paella – rice with saffron, cooked in a shallow pan
- Sausage, such as chorizo, morcilla, and salchichón
- Sobao – sweet bread
- Stew, such as cocido madrileño (Madrid stew)
- Tarta de Santiago – almond cake or tart
- Caragols a la llauna (cooked snails)
- Sonsos and many other Mediterranean fresh fish
- Crema catalana (custard made from egg yolks, milk, sugar, lemon zest and cinnamon)
- Panellets (bite-sized cakes in different shapes, mostly round, made mainly of marzipan)
- Torreznos – bacon
- Tortilla española or tortilla de patata – potato omelet

=== Switzerland ===
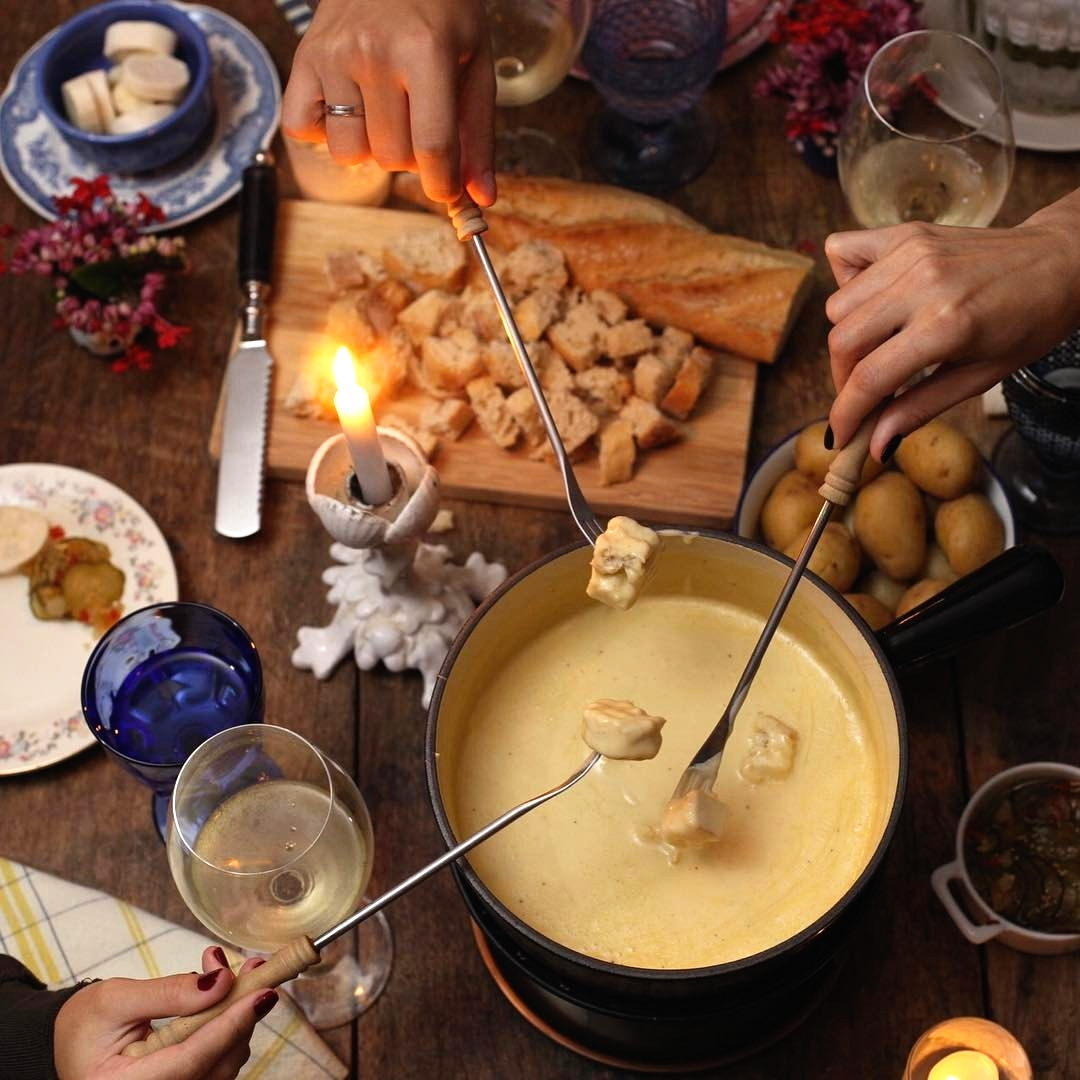
Fondue is an emblematic Swiss comfort food.

Traditional Swiss cuisine is characterized by its simplicity and extensive use of dairy products like cheese, cream and butter. Fruits (often apple compote) are also used in many (main) dishes, notably Älplermagronen and Maluns.

- Älplermagronen – pasta, potatoes, cream, cheese, and onions
- Capuns – stuffed leaves
- Cholera – filled pastry
- Fondue – melted cheese sauce for dipping
- Maluns – potato pieces slow-fried in butter
- Pizzoccheri – buckwheat-and-wheat pasta with cheese
- Raclette – melted cheese
- Rösti – grated potato pancake with various accompaniments
- Wähe – pastry shell with custard and various ingredients

=== Taiwan ===
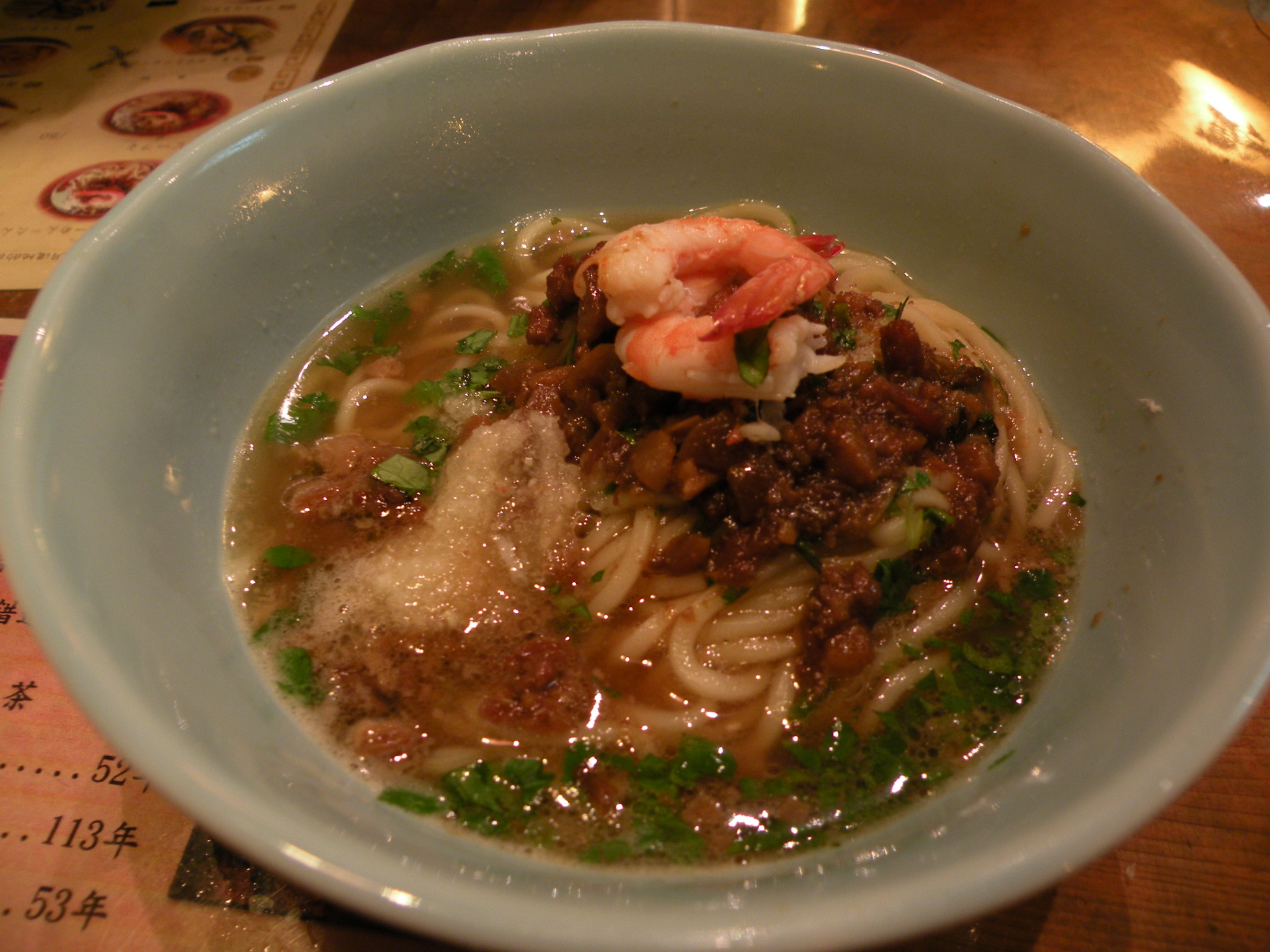
Dan zai noodles

- Beef noodle soup
- Dan zai noodles – noodles and prawn with broth
- Minced pork rice
- Oyster omelette
- Red bean soup
- Small sausage in large sausage – grilled sausage in a rice casing
- Tangyuan – filled rice dumplings in sweet syrup

=== Turkey ===
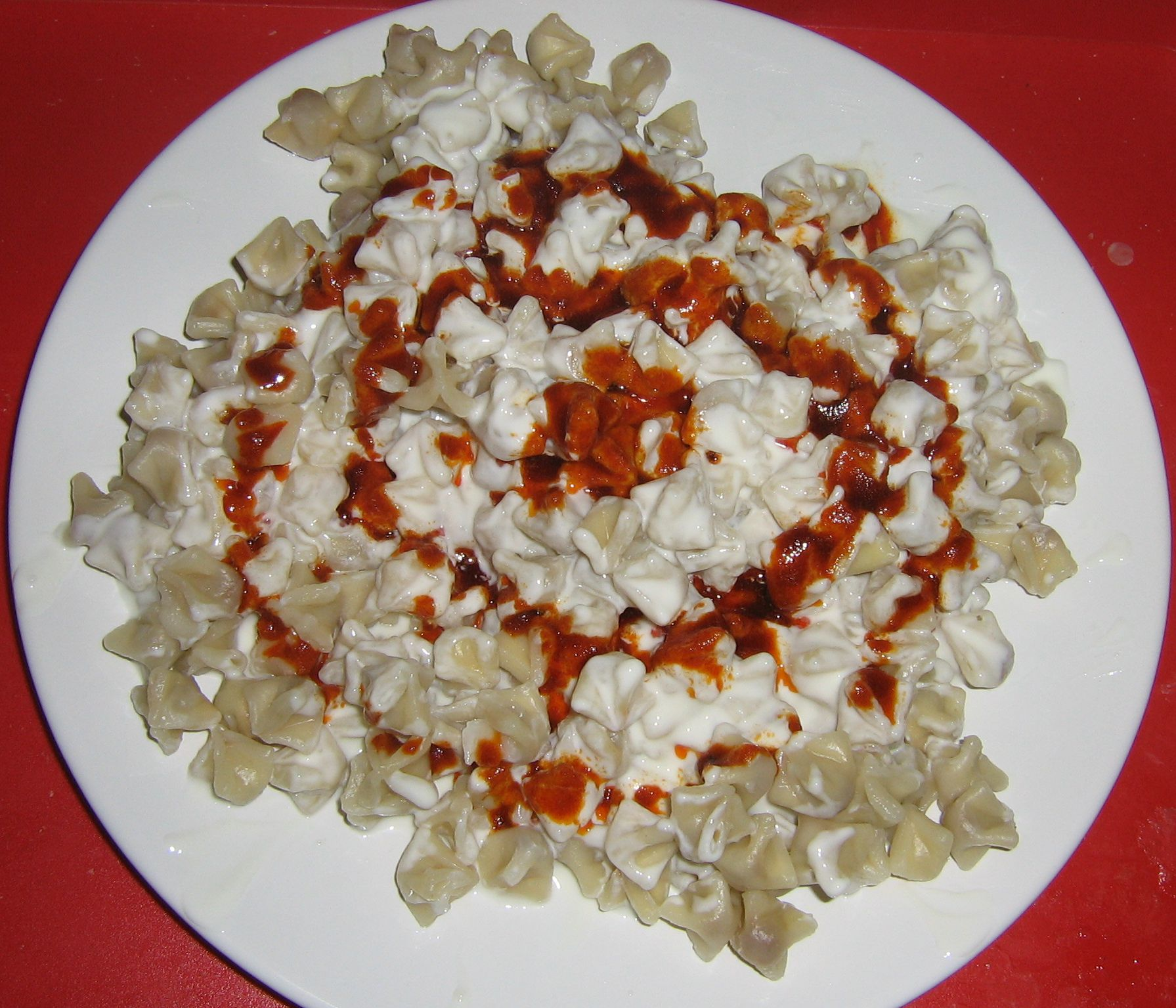
Mantı, with yogurt and red pepper sauce

Some Turkish comfort foods are:

- Mantı – spicy meat dumpling
- Kuru fasulye – bean and tomato stew
- Pilav – rice dish
- Mercimek Çorbası – a soup based on lentils
- Börek – baked filled pastries, a wide variety of regional variations of börek exists
- Menemen - commonly eaten for breakfast
- Yaprak Sarma - stuffed grape leaves
- Gözleme - a stuffed flatbread, commonly stuffed with spinach, minced meat and potato mash
- Lahmacun
- Pide
- Tarhana soup

=== Ukraine ===
Ukrainian comfort foods include, but aren't limited to:

- Borscht — beetroots soup, also there are few variants:
  - Green borscht
  - White borscht
  - Cabbage borscht
- Deruny — potato pancakes with sour cream
- Holubtsi — small, medium or large rolls with prepared rice
  - Cabbage roll
  - Grape leaves roll
- Kasha — kind of porridge
- Kolach — sweet, round shaped pastry
- Mlynci — pancakes.
  - Nalysnyky — pancakes with fillings
- Pampushky — small savory or sweet yeast-raised bun
- Pyrizhky — baked or fried small donuts with different (mostly fruits or meat) fillings. (Not to be confused with Polish PiErogi or Russian PirogI)
- Syrnyky — fried quark pancakes, garnished with sour cream
- Varennia — jam
- Varenyky — Filled dumplings cooked at boiling water
- Vinegret — Beans and potato salad colored with beetroots

=== United Kingdom ===
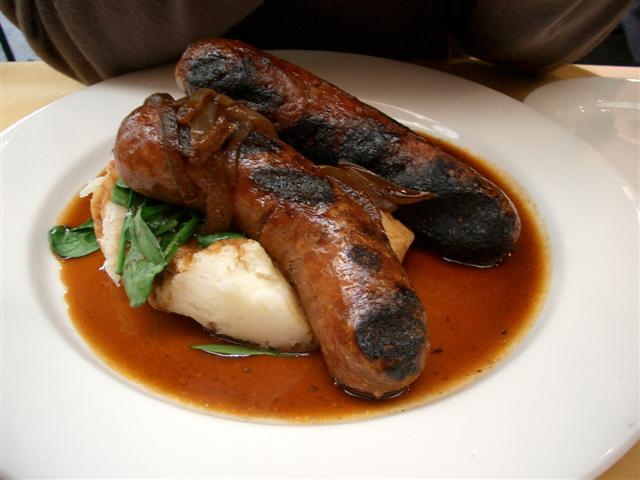
Bangers and mash is a British comfort food.

United Kingdom comfort foods include:

- Bacon butty (bacon sandwich)
- Bangers and mash – sausages and mashed potatoes
- Biscuit
- Beef stew
- Cauliflower cheese
- Chicken tikka masala
- Chips
- Cornish pasty
- Cottage pie (Shepherd's pie)
- Custard
- Curry – India-inspired stew over rice
- Egg and chips
- Egg and soldiers – toast sliced into approximately six to eight pieces lengthwise, to dip into soft-boiled egg yolk
- Fish and chips
- Fish finger sandwich
- Fried chicken
- Fruit crumble – stewed fruit with crumbly topping
- Full English breakfast
- Lancashire hotpot
- Macaroni and cheese
- Pies
- Cheese and onion pie
  - Fish pie
  - Meat and potato pie
  - Pork pie
  - Steak and kidney pie
- Potatoes
  - Jacket potato
  - Mashed potatoes
- Puddings
  - Bread and butter pudding
  - Jam roly-poly – suet pudding rolled in a spiral with jam
  - Rice pudding
  - Spotted dick – steamed pudding with dried fruit
  - Sticky toffee pudding
  - Treacle pudding
- Roasted meat, such as Beef or chicken
- Scotch egg – hard-boiled egg baked in sausage
- Soups and stews
  - Beef stew with dumplings
  - Cock-a-leekie soup
  - Scouse – meat stew
  - Potato, leek, and Stilton soup
- Stottie cake – heavy, round bread
- Toad in the hole – sausages baked in Yorkshire pudding
- Toast
  - Baked beans on toast
  - Welsh rarebit – hot cheese sauce on toast
- Toastie – grilled sandwich
- Tea
- Yorkshire pudding

=== United States ===
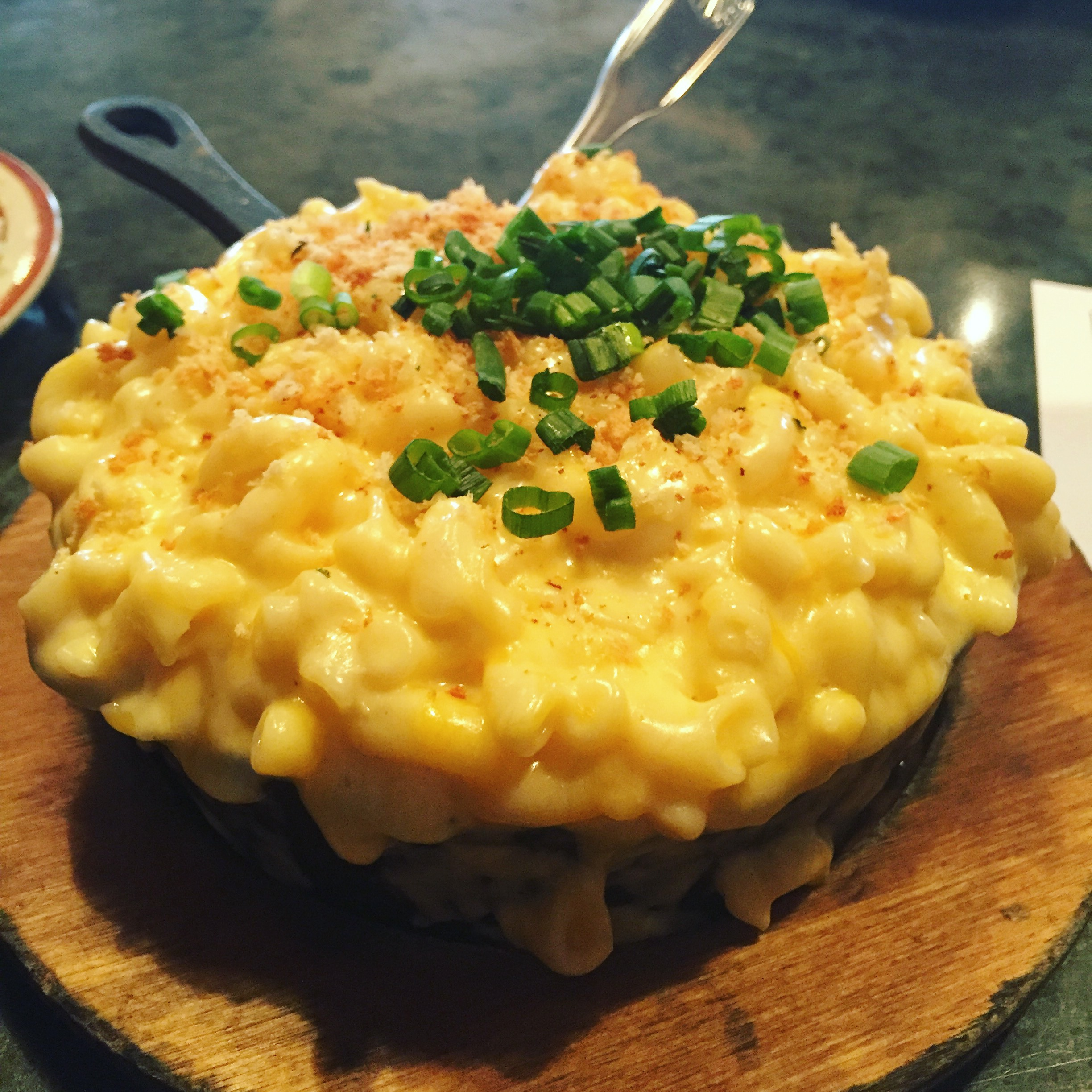
Macaroni and cheese is an American comfort food.

American comfort foods may include the following foods:

- Beef stew
- Biscuits and gravy
- Breakfast cereal
- Burritos
- Casseroles such as green bean casserole, hotdish, tamale pie, and tuna casserole
- Cheeseburgers
- Chicken and dumplings
- Chicken-fried steak
- Chicken soup
- Chili
- Chili mac
- Chocolate
- Chowders: Clam chowder, shrimp chowder, corn chowder, etc.
- Cornbread
- Corned beef and cabbage
- Creamed chipped beef
- Desserts such as apple pie, cake, chocolate chip cookies, cupcakes, and tapioca pudding
- Fluffernutter – peanut butter and marshmallow fluff sandwich
- French fries
- Fried chicken
- Green chile stew
- Grilled cheese sandwich and tomato soup
- Grits
- Ice cream
- Lasagna
- Macaroni and cheese
- Mashed potatoes
- Meatloaf
- Peanut butter and jelly sandwich
- Pepperoni rolls
- Pizza
- Popcorn
- Potato chips
- Pot roast
- Red beans and rice

== See also ==
- Diet food
- Dish (food)
- Emotional eating
- Food group
- Food presentation
- Haute cuisine
- List of foods
- List of nutrition guides
- Outline of food preparation
- Portion size
- Whole food
