= Tshik-á-mī =

Traditional Taiwanese noodle dish

Tshi̍k-á-mī
- Type: Noodle soup
- Place of origin: Taiwan
- Region or state: Luzhou District, New Taipei
- Main ingredients: Egg noodles, pork, bean sprouts, leek, lard, fried shallots
- Similar dishes: Tàⁿ-á-mī

Tshi̍k-á-mī (Chinese: 摵仔麵) is a traditional Taiwanese noodle dish believed to originate from Luzhou District, New Taipei.

The name of the noodle comes from the Taiwanese Hokkien word for the "bamboo basket" or "mesh strainer" used to remove excess water to obtain its characteristic Q texture.

Made with egg noodles, the dish was invented during the Japanese colonial era, but only gained popularity after the retreat of the government of the Republic of China to Taiwan.

The noodle dish could be either served with or without soup. The soup is typically prepared using pork bones and pork belly, although chicken and traditional medicinal herbs are sometimes added to enhance the flavor. Cooked noodles are added to the broth along with leek and bean sprouts, then topped with pork slices. Following the traditional method, a small amount of pork fat and fried shallots are sprinkled over the dish just before serving.

== See also ==
- Taiwanese cuisine
- List of noodle dishes
- Taiwanese beef noodle soup
- Tàⁿ-á-mī
- Q texture
