= Flädle =

Pancake ribbons added to soup

Flädle, (Austria: Frittatensuppe; France: Consommé Célestine)
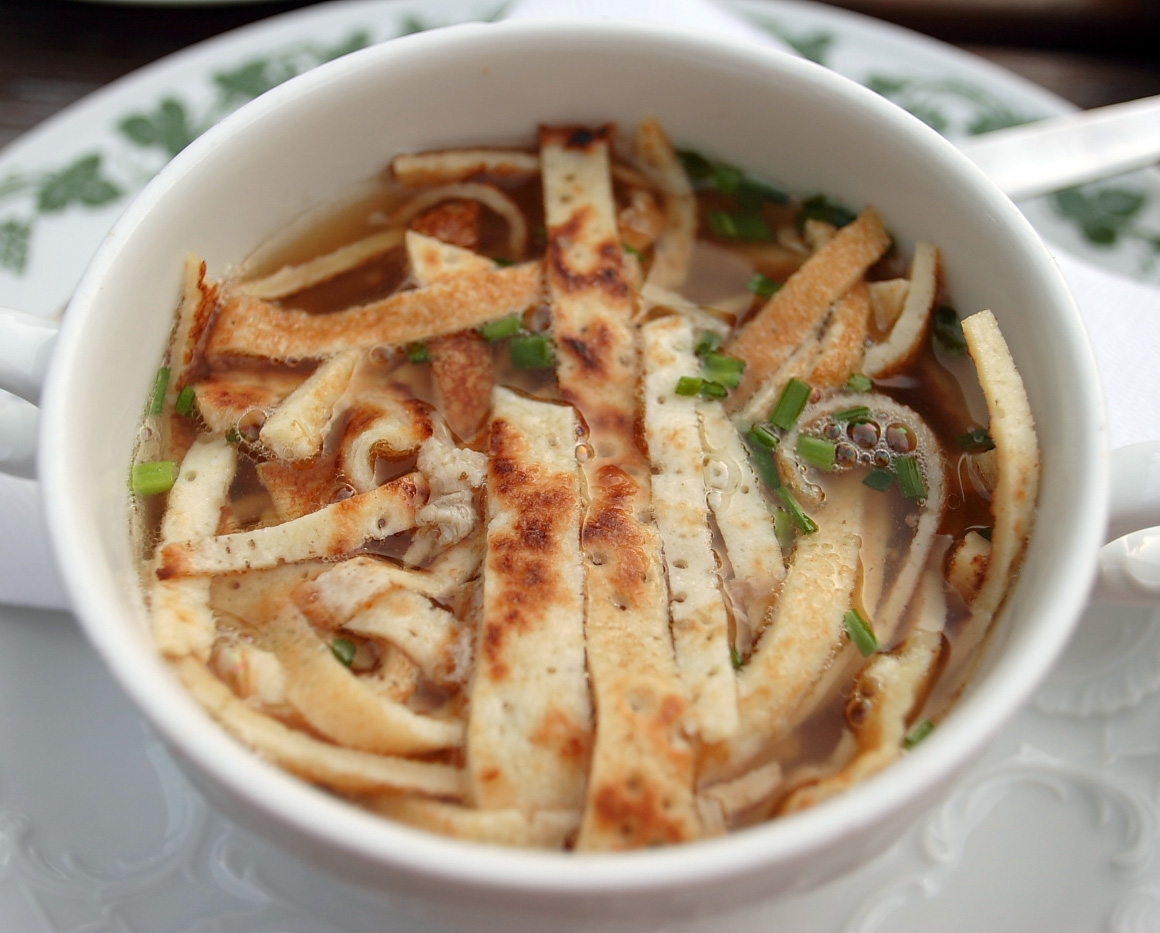
- Type: Pancake, Palatschinken
- Place of origin: Austria, Germany, France
- Region or state: Austria, Swabia

Flädle is a southern German garnish and soup ingredient from the region of Baden-Württemberg consisting of savory pancakes, cut into ribbons.

Flädle are made by first making plain crepe-style pancakes, then tightly rolling them up and slicing them into ribbons. They are then usually served in a clear soup or beef broth in a dish of Flädlesuppe. In other parts of Germany, the dish is known as Eierkuchensuppe, derived from the regional name Eierkuchen (lit. "egg cakes") for pancakes.

== Austria ==
Frittatensuppe (Frittaten soup) is one of the most popular soups in Austrian cuisine. It is considered an Austrian national dish. Frittaten (from the Italian frittata, "frying") are sliced pancakes called Palatschinken, combined with beef consommé it becomes the famous soup. Even today, "frittata" and "frittella" are used to refer to omelets in Italy; a recipe for one can be found in the "Freiwillig Aufgesprungener Granatapfel" (The Christian Samaritan's Freely Opened Pomegranate) cookbook (Graz 1699), which is Austria's second-oldest printed cookbook.

== France ==
In France there is a similar dish known as Consommé Célestine. It is served with long strips of crepes as in the Austrian version, but there are other versions in which the crepes are filled before cutting them into strips. The filling can be meat and herbs or herbs and cottage cheese.

== Trivia ==
The Austrian author Thomas Bernhard had people dine extensively in almost all of his works. For instance in his book Der Theatermacher ("The Theater Maker"), he described a state actor named Bruscon who travels through the Austrian provinces whining about how awful the frittaten soup is everywhere: "Always these grease eyes..." Except at Gaspoltshofen, which is down to Hedi Klinger (the chef) and the fact that Bernhard frequented the establishment when residing nearby at Lake Traunsee. Hedi's frittaten soup was one of his favorites. The poet grants his Bruscon the greatest success with his traveling theater at Gaspolshofen out of gratitude.

From this developed a real frittaten soup tourism. Willi Klinger (Hedi Klingers son):Der Theatermacher

Original: „Andauernd kamen Literaturwissenschaftler und Feuilletonredakteure in unser Gasthaus und wollten etwas über Thomas Bernhard und die Frittatensuppe erfahren. Meine Mutter fand das ziemlich übertrieben, zumal Bernhards Lieblingsgericht immer noch der Schweinsbraten war.“

English: "Literary scholars and feature editors visited our inn frequently and inquire about Thomas Bernhard and the Frittatensuppe. My mother thought this was rather excessive, especially since Bernhard's favorite dish was still roast pork."

This gave German comedian and author Harald Schmidt the idea to travel to Bernhard's favorite guesthouses and follow his culinary trail. In collaboration with other authors, he wrote a book titled "In der Frittatensuppe feiert die Provinz ihre Triumphe" (In Frittatensuppe, the Province Celebrates Its Triumphs).

== See also ==
- List of pancakes
