= Älplermagronen =

Swiss dish of pasta and potatoes, with cream, cheese and onions

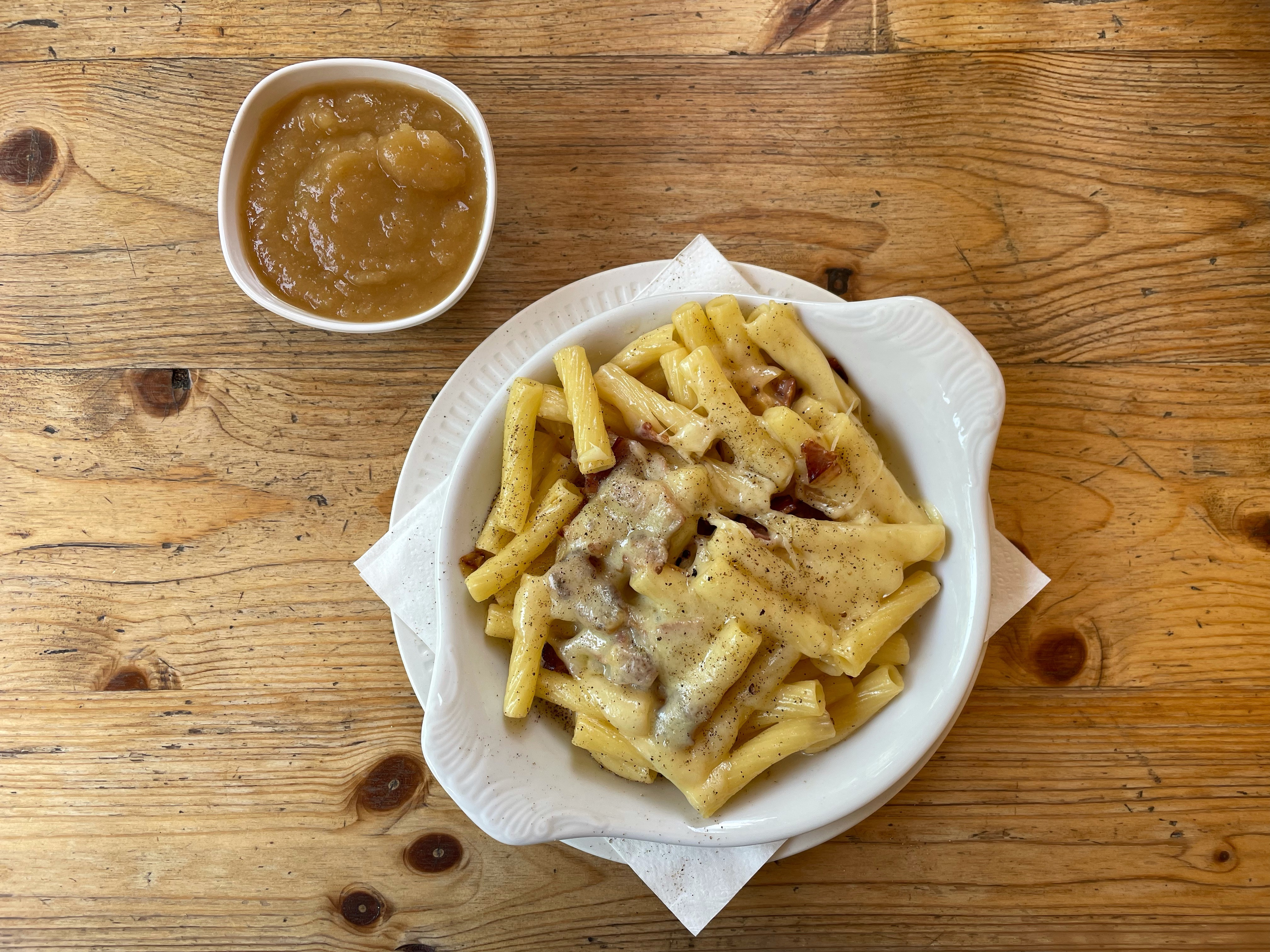
Älplermagronen served with apple compote

Älplermagronen, also spelled Älplermakkaronen, is a dish from the Alpine regions of Switzerland, consisting of pasta, potatoes, cream, cheese, and onions. The name is made up of "Älpler" as a designation for the Alpine herder and "Magronen", which was taken as a loan word from the Italian word maccheroni.

== History ==
Älplermagronen are now regarded as a traditional dish of the Swiss Alps and a classic of Swiss comfort foods. According to a popular theory, pasta became widespread in northern Switzerland in the late 19th century, when the Gotthard Tunnel was built, partly by Italian workers who brought dry pasta with them. In any case, dry pasta eventually became very popular in Switzerland, especially among the herdsmen, because it could be conserved easily and was very light given its nutritional value – both invaluable advantages at a time when all foods except milk and cheese had to be transported up to the alp. The "Magronen" were stretched with local potatoes, enriched with cream and cheese, and seasoned with onions. This hearty dish was easy to prepare in a cauldron over an open fire and was particularly filling after a hard working day on the alp.

The first mass production of Macaroni was in Switzerland By 1731, Disentis Abbey mentions in its archives a thread press machine to make hollow macaroni noodles. In 1836, A Bernese cookbook includes a "maccaroni" and cheese recipe. Switzerland’s first pasta factory opened in 1838 in Lucerne and, in 1872, commercial production of macaroni as we know it today is attested.

== Recipe and variants ==
Älplermagronen are typically made from Swiss pasta, which contains eggs, preferably in thick shapes such as penne, ziti or macaroni. The smaller Hörnli (in French: cornettes) can also be used. The pasta is boiled together with diced potatoes, adding both ingredients in order, considering the difference in cooking time. The amount of liquid is measured so that it is absorbed in its entirety when the potatoes and pasta are soft. Cream and coarsely grated cheese are then added and the mixture is left to stand for a few minutes until the cheese has melted. The dish is then sprinkled with fried onions, and traditionally served with the accompaniment of apple compote.

The dish has regional variations: In some areas, strips of ham, roasted bacon or cervelat are added. In the canton of Uri, the potatoes are omitted. In the canton of Obwalden, Älplermagronen are also called Hindersi-Magronen (due to the order of preparation in the Obwalden recipe, "Hindersi" meaning "backwards" in Swiss German). In French-speaking Switzerland, macaronis du chalet are a very similar dish but sometimes without the potatoes.

== Popularity ==
As an easy-to-cook and filling dish, Älplermagronen are a popular choice in Scout circles and in the Swiss Armed Forces menu.

Älplermagronen are often cooked and served in mountain huts or mountain restaurants. Älplermagronen are also sold as a ready meal in supermarkets.

A similar dish, macaroni and cheese, popular in North America and the United Kingdom, might have been derived from Älplermagronen.

== See also ==
- Rösti, other popular Swiss dish consisting only of potatoes
