= Cheese and onion pie =

Savoury pie dish

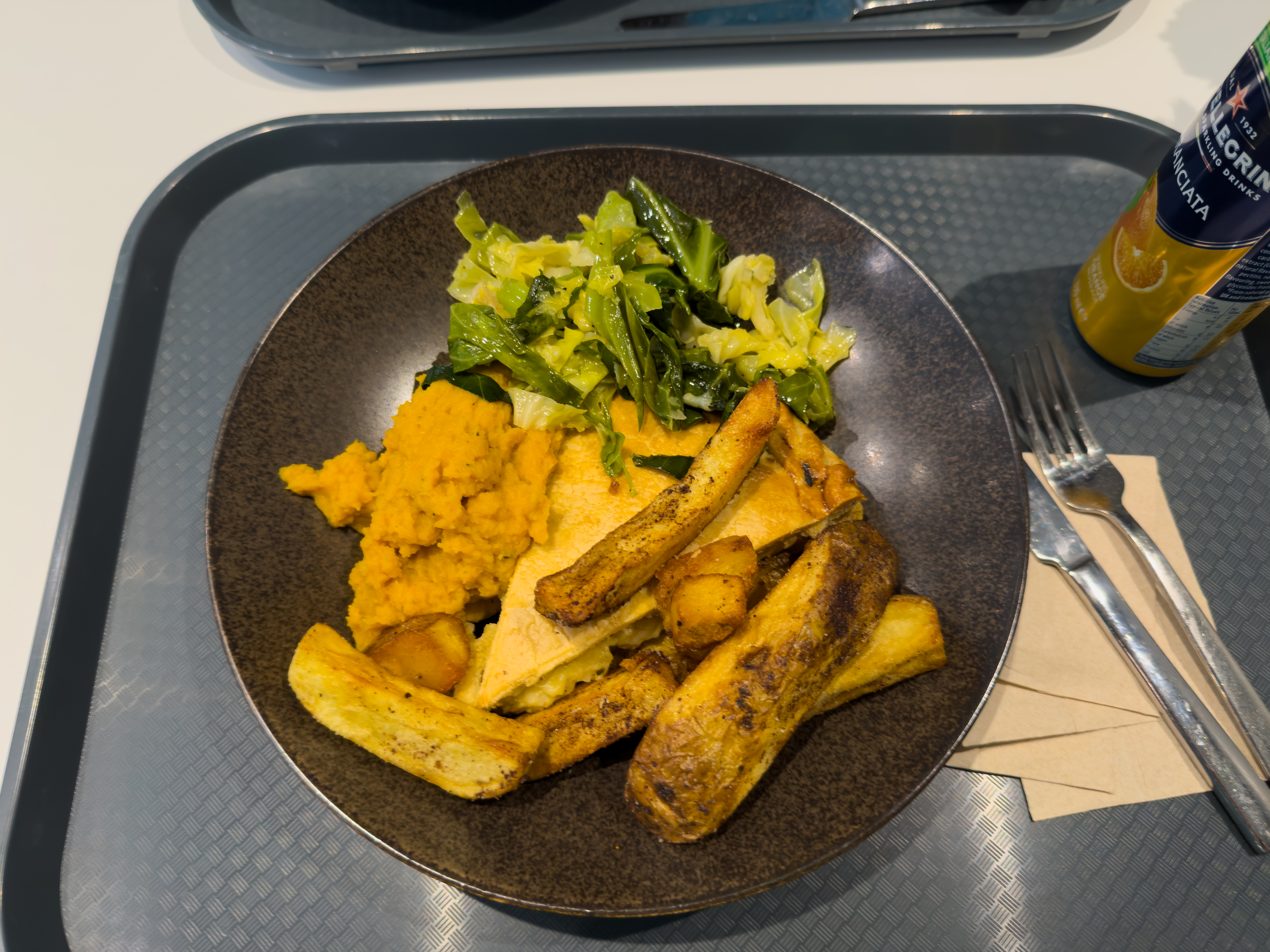
- A cheese and onion pie, as part of a meal
- Course: Main course
- Place of origin: England
- Region or state: North West
- Main ingredients: Cheese and onion

Cheese and onion pie is a savoury dish, the basis of which is an outer layer of savoury pastry filled with a mixture of cheese, onion, herbs and sometimes potato. Many recipes contain Lancashire cheese, indicating an origin in North West England.

== History ==
This was a food traditionally popular with the working classes of Northern England, due to a combination of relatively cheap ingredients which provided sustenance to workers, particularly in the mining, steel, and manufacturing industries. Today there are artisanal versions of the dish available; however, potato is often used to add bulk to cheaper mass-produced pies.

== See also ==
- List of pies, tarts and flans
