= Tàⁿ-á-mī =

Taiwanese noodle dish

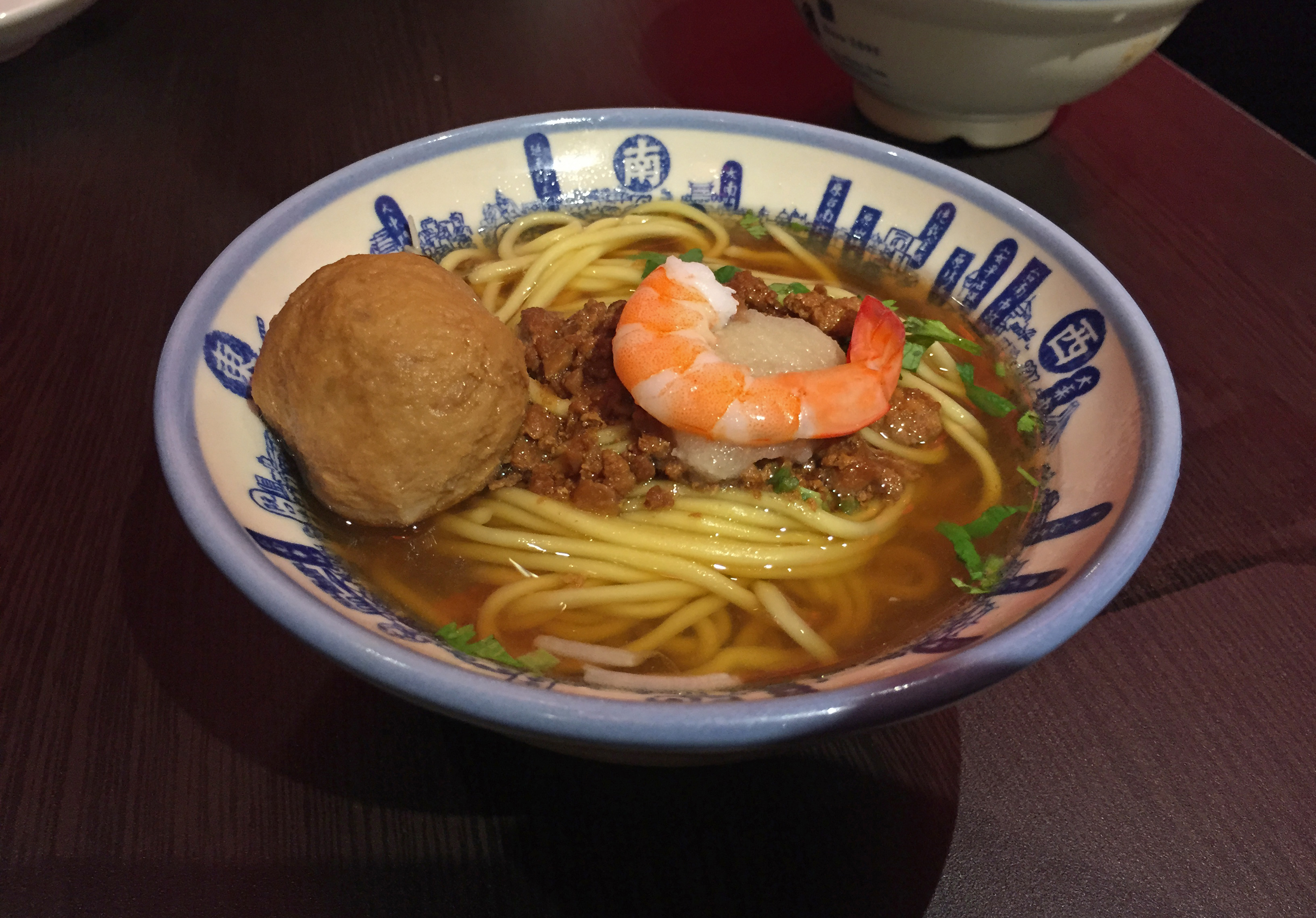
- Ta'a noodles
- Course: Main course
- Place of origin: Taiwan
- Region or state: Nationwide
- Created by: Taiwanese
- Serving temperature: Hot
- Main ingredients: Chinese wheat noodles, shrimp-flavored soup, shrimp, coriander, minced pork, garlic

Tàⁿ-á-mī (Chinese: 擔仔麵; pinyin: dànzǎimiàn; Tâi-lô: tànn-á-mī; lit. 'shoulder pole noodle'), also known as ta-a noodles or danzai noodles, are a type of snack found in Tainan, Taiwan. Also known as "slack season ta-a noodles", they originated in Tainan (in southern Taiwan) about 130 years ago. While the general recipe is well known, some of the spices and the proportions of the various ingredients (shrimp-flavored soup, shrimp, minced pork, coriander, and garlic) are closely guarded secrets by the different restaurants and stands that serve it.

== Origin ==
Ta-a noodles are said to originate in the late Qing dynasty, around 1895. During the Tomb Sweeping Festival and summer season (July to September) each year in Taiwan, there are frequent typhoons, rendering fishing too dangerous. These "slack seasons" were known to fishermen as "small months" (Chinese: 小月; Pe̍h-ōe-jī: sió-go̍eh) and the phrase "pass the small months" (度小月; tō͘-sió-go̍eh) refers to enduring the slack seasons.

Hong Yutou (洪芋頭; Âng Ō͘-thâu), a fisherman from Tainan, descended from fishermen in Zhangzhou, Fujian, began to sell noodles at age 20. At first it was to earn money during the off-seasons but eventually became his primary occupation. In the beginning, he carried his noodles on shoulder poles (擔; tàⁿ) and sold them on the street before setting up a small stall in front of the Tainan Chuisian Temple (水仙宮; Chuí-sian-kiong) with the Chinese characters 度小月擔仔麵 (tō͘-sió-go̍eh tàⁿ-á-mī) written on lanterns, hence the name "slack season ta-a noodles".

== Gallery ==
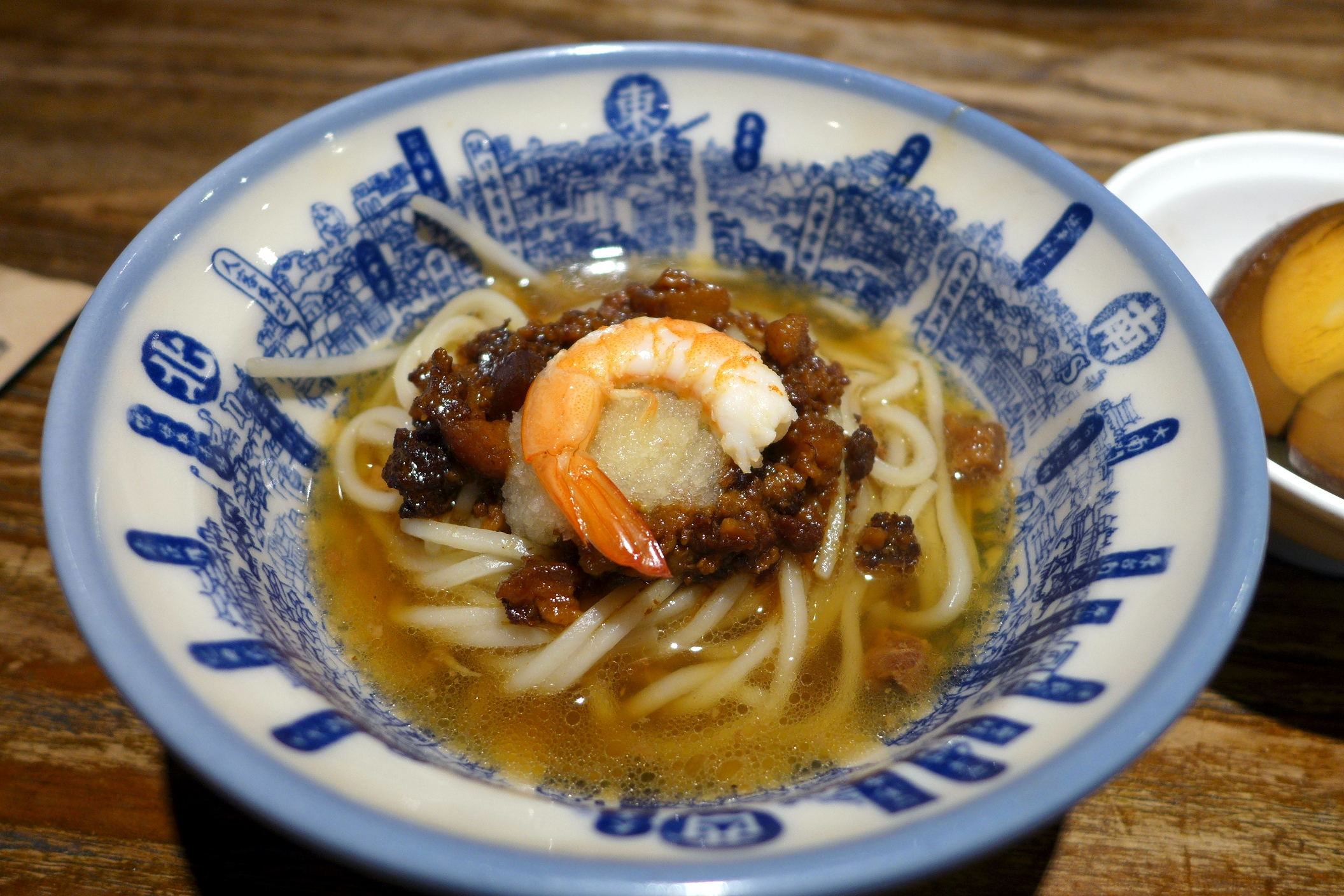

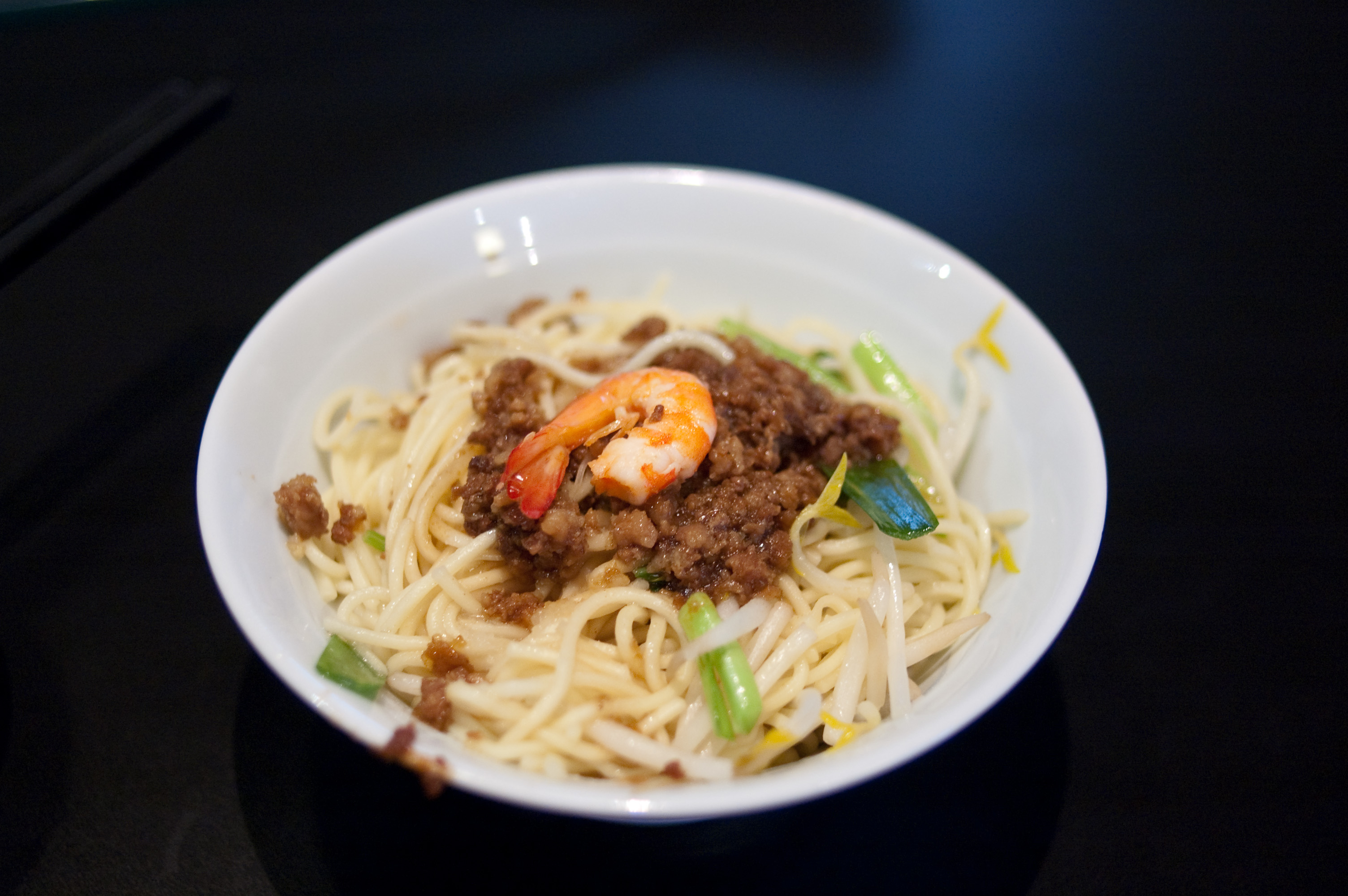

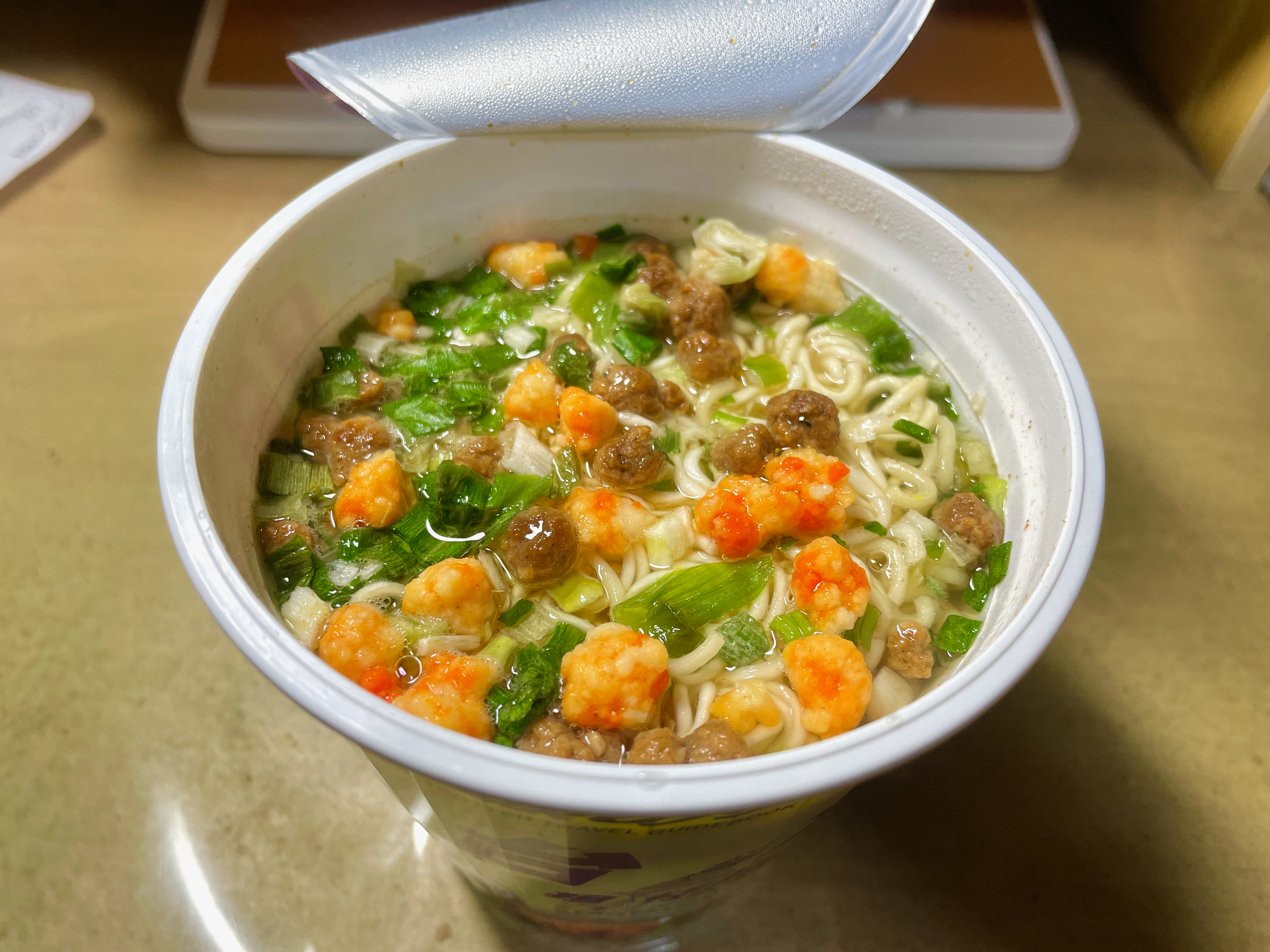
As cup noodle, made by Sapporo Ichiban

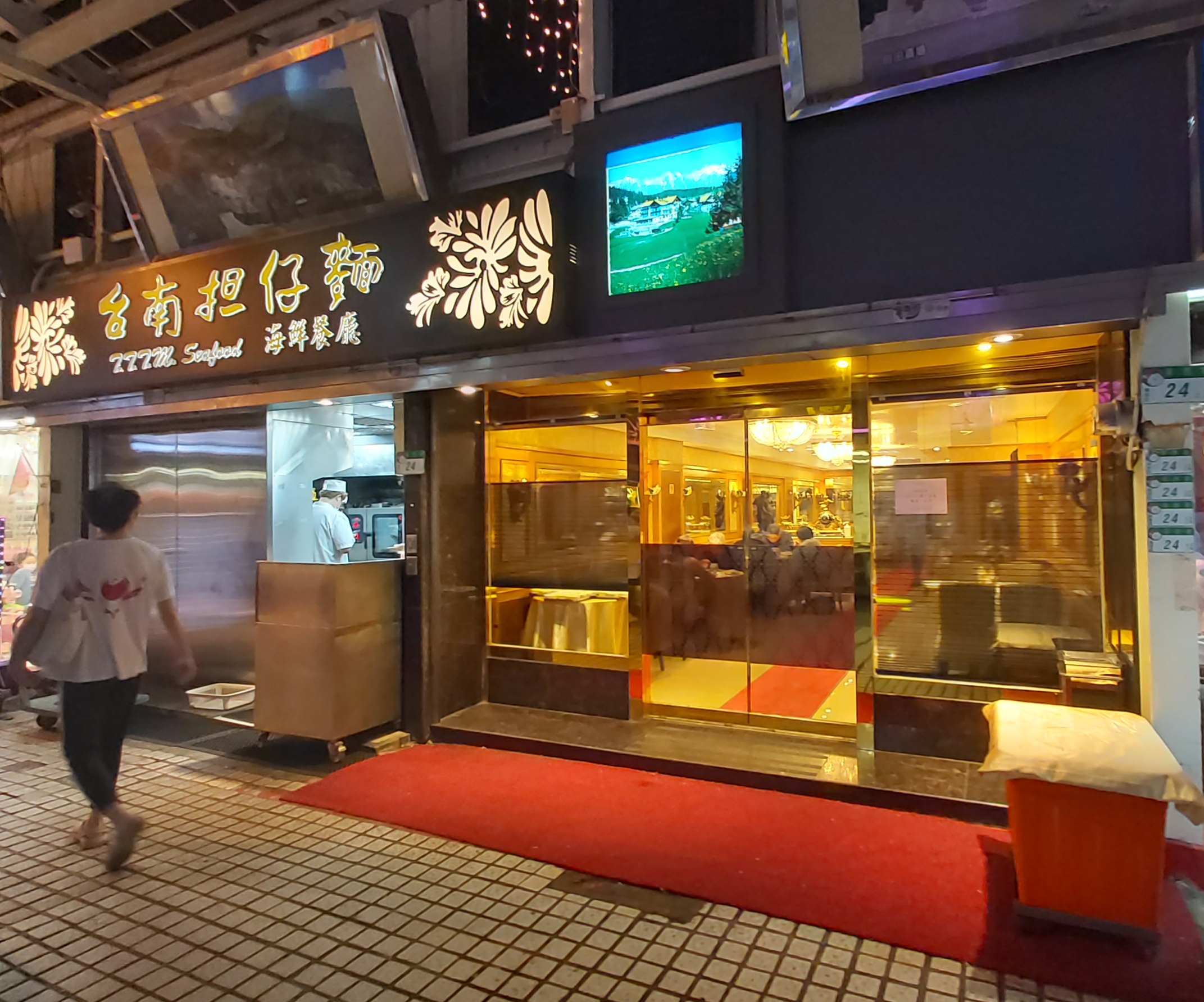
Ta'a-mi restaurant in Tainan

== See also ==
- Tshik-á-mī
- Dandan noodles, a Sichuan noodle dish of similar etymology
- Taiwanese cuisine
- List of noodle dishes
