= Bacalhau à minhota =

Portuguese salt cod dish

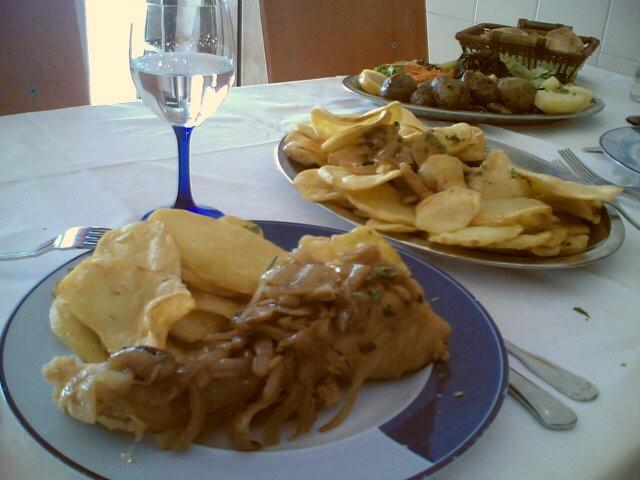
- Bacalhau à Minhota served in Vila Praia de Âncora
- Place of origin: Braga, Portugal
- Main ingredients: Bacalhau, fried potatoes, onion, olive oil, grelos and olives

Bacalhau à minhota (Portuguese pronunciation: [bɐ.kɐˈʎaw a miˈɲɔ.tɐ], meaning "salt cod in the style of minhota") is a traditional dish from the Alto Minho region in northern Portugal.

It consists of cod steaks sprinkled with paprika and fried in oil. In the same oil, thickly sliced potatoes are fried. Finally, thin slices of onion are slowly fried in olive oil and placed on top of the cod (bacalhau) before serving. The finished dish can be garnished with olives and served with grelos.

== See also ==
- Bacalhau à Narcisa
- Bacalhau à Brás
- Bacalhau à Gomes de Sá
- Bacalhau à Zé do Pipo
