= Bacalhau com natas =

Salt cod casserole

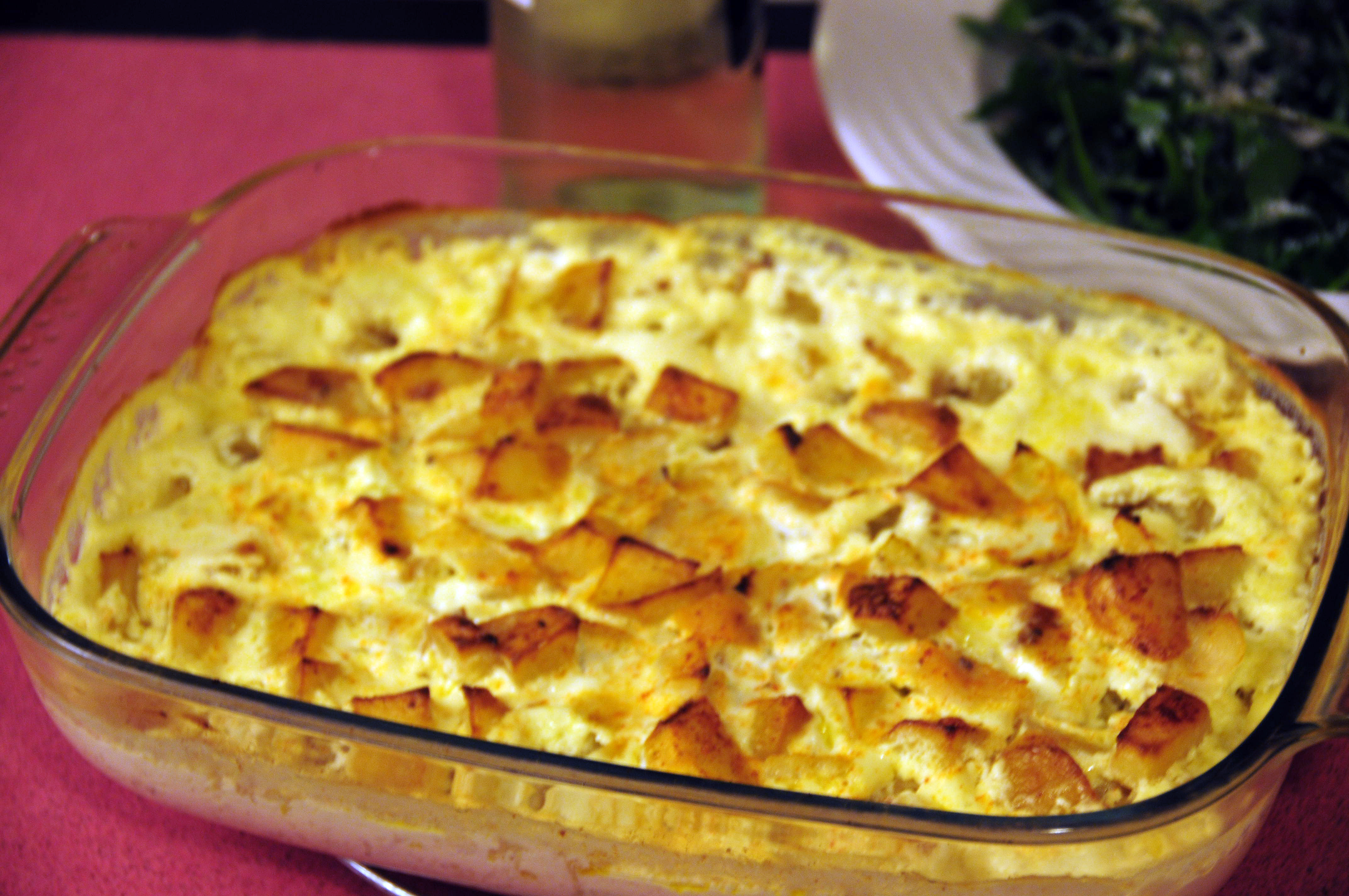
- Place of origin: Portugal
- Main ingredients: Bacalhau, onions, fried potatoes and double cream

Bacalhau com natas (Portuguese pronunciation: [bɐ.kɐˈʎaw kõ ˈna.tɐʃ], meaning "cod with double cream") is a popular way of cooking salted cod (bacalhau) in Portugal. This dish consists of baked cod in the oven layered with onions, diced fried potatoes (or leftover cooked potatoes) and double cream, usually seasoned with nutmeg and white pepper.

This is a simple dish to prepare and very popular both at home and in restaurants. Since it doesn’t require a large amount of cod, it can be a way to use leftover cod or to make a cod dish for more people.

The origin of the dish is somewhat unclear; it may have been created by the Count of Guarda (as there is a similar recipe called Bacalhau à Conde da Guarda) or developed and popularized by chef João Ribeiro in the 1930s.

== See also ==
- List of casserole dishes
- Bacalhau à Brás
- Bacalhau à Gomes de Sá
- Bacalhau à Narcisa
- Bacalhau à Zé do Pipo
- Janssons frestelse
