= Bacalhau à Narcisa (restaurant) =

Portuguese restaurant

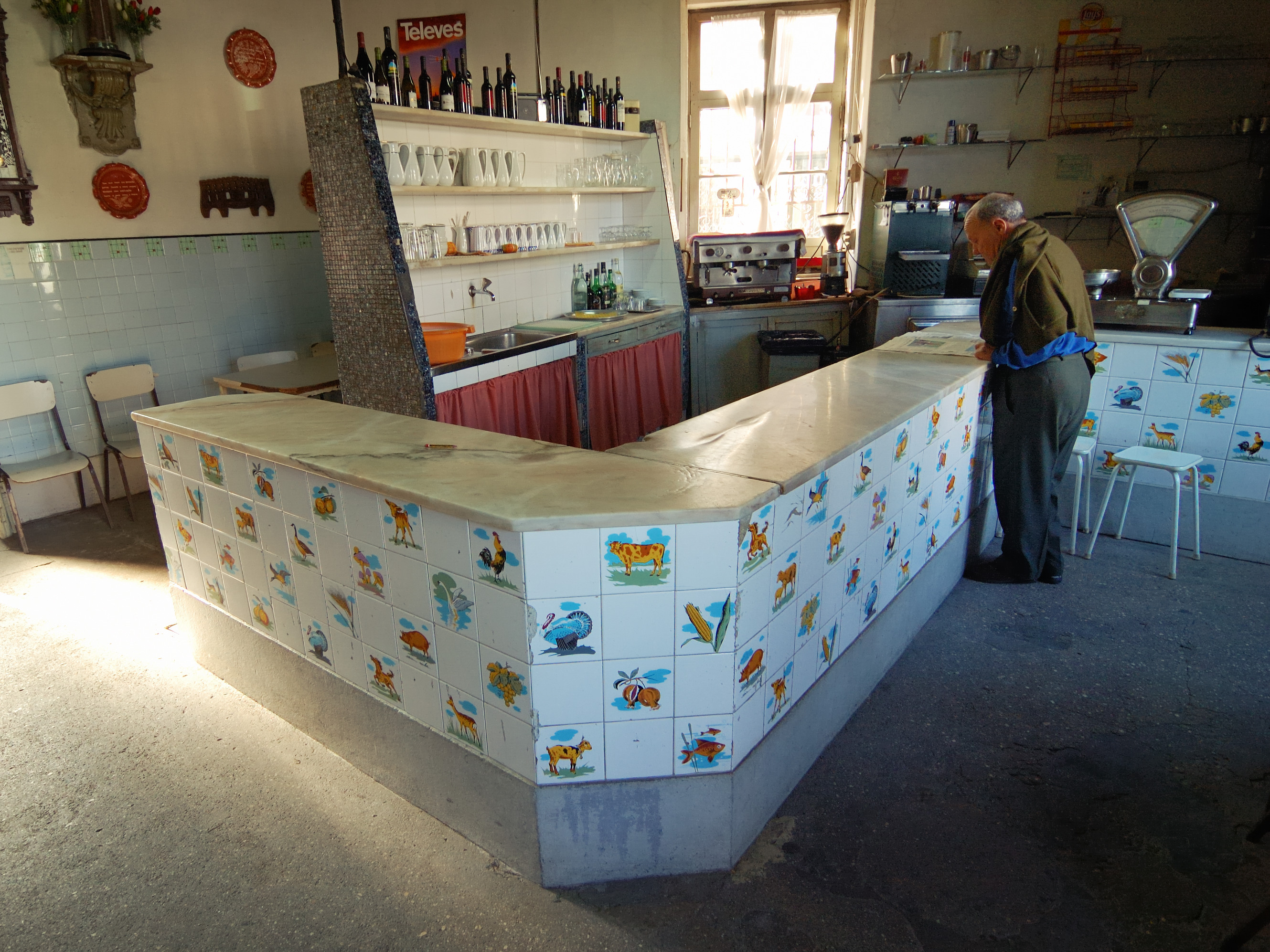

Restaurant information
- Established: 1930
- Closed: 2008
- Chef: Narcisa; Dona Eusébia (Note: Dona is a Portuguese honorific similar to “Mrs.”.)
- Food type: Portuguese food
- Location: Braga, Portugal

Bacalhau à Narcisa (Portuguese pronunciation: [bɐ.kɐˈʎaw a naɾˈsi.zɐ], meaning "salt cod in the style of Narcisa") was a traditional restaurant in the city of Braga, Portugal, founded in 1930 and closed in 2008. It became nationally known for its tavern-like atmosphere, where, for about a century, the traditional Bacalhau à Narcisa was served.

The restaurant specialized in preparing cod (bacalhau), which was fried in olive oil in a full pan, served with sliced fried potatoes and accompanied by red or white Vinho Verde. Despite the name, the recipe was created by Dona Eusébia (who died in 1972), who kept the name of the tavern that had belonged to a certain Narcisa. Due to her advanced age, Narcisa could not continue running the business and handed it over to Dona Eusébia and her husband, Félix Ferreira Valença, in the mid-1930s.

This restaurant was considered by the Lusa News Agency as "one of the most emblematic in Braga." It is said to have been visited by famous figures such as the fado singer Amália Rodrigues and the actress Beatriz Costa, due to the renown of its cod dish.

A namesake restaurant in its honor opened on June 11, 2025, on Rua de São Domingos, near the site of the original establishment at Largo de Monte de Arcos, both in the parish of São Victor, Braga.

== See also ==
- Bacalhau à Narcisa
