= Bacalhau à Brás =

Portuguese salt cod dish

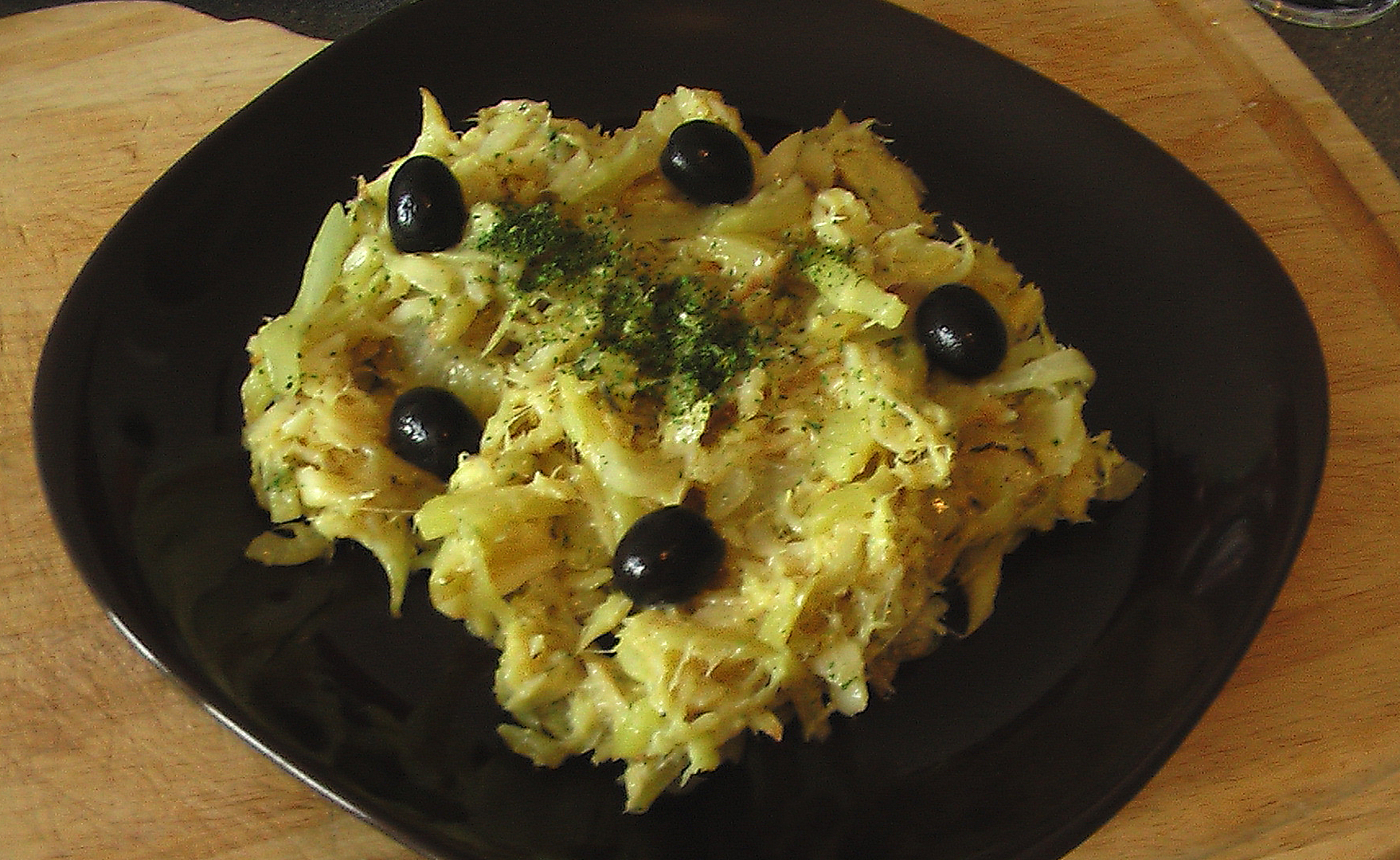
- Place of origin: Lisbon, Portugal
- Invented: 19th century?
- Main ingredients: Bacalhau, onions, fried potatoes and eggs

Bacalhau à Brás (Portuguese pronunciation: [bɐkɐˈʎaw a ˈβɾaʃ], meaning "salt cod in the style of Brás") is a Portuguese dish made from shreds of salted cod (bacalhau), onions and thinly chopped (matchstick-sized) fried potatoes, all bound with eggs. It is usually garnished with black olives and sprinkled with fresh flat-leaf parsley. The origin of the recipe is uncertain, but in its current form it is said to have originated during the second half of the 19th century in Bairro Alto, an old quarter of Lisbon, probably from older and related cod recipes with other names but similar cooking techniques. The name "Brás" (or sometimes Braz, Blaise in English) is supposedly the name of its creator.

The "à Brás" technique is often used with other ingredients, such as vegetables, chicken, and mushrooms. Dishes like frango à Brás also known as Brás de frango, which is made using chicken instead of cod, became popular as well.

It is Cristiano Ronaldo’s favorite dish.

== See also ==
- Bacalhau à Narcisa
- Bacalhau à Gomes de Sá
- Bacalhau à Zé do Pipo
- Bacalhau com natas
