= Coddies =

Deep fried snack food

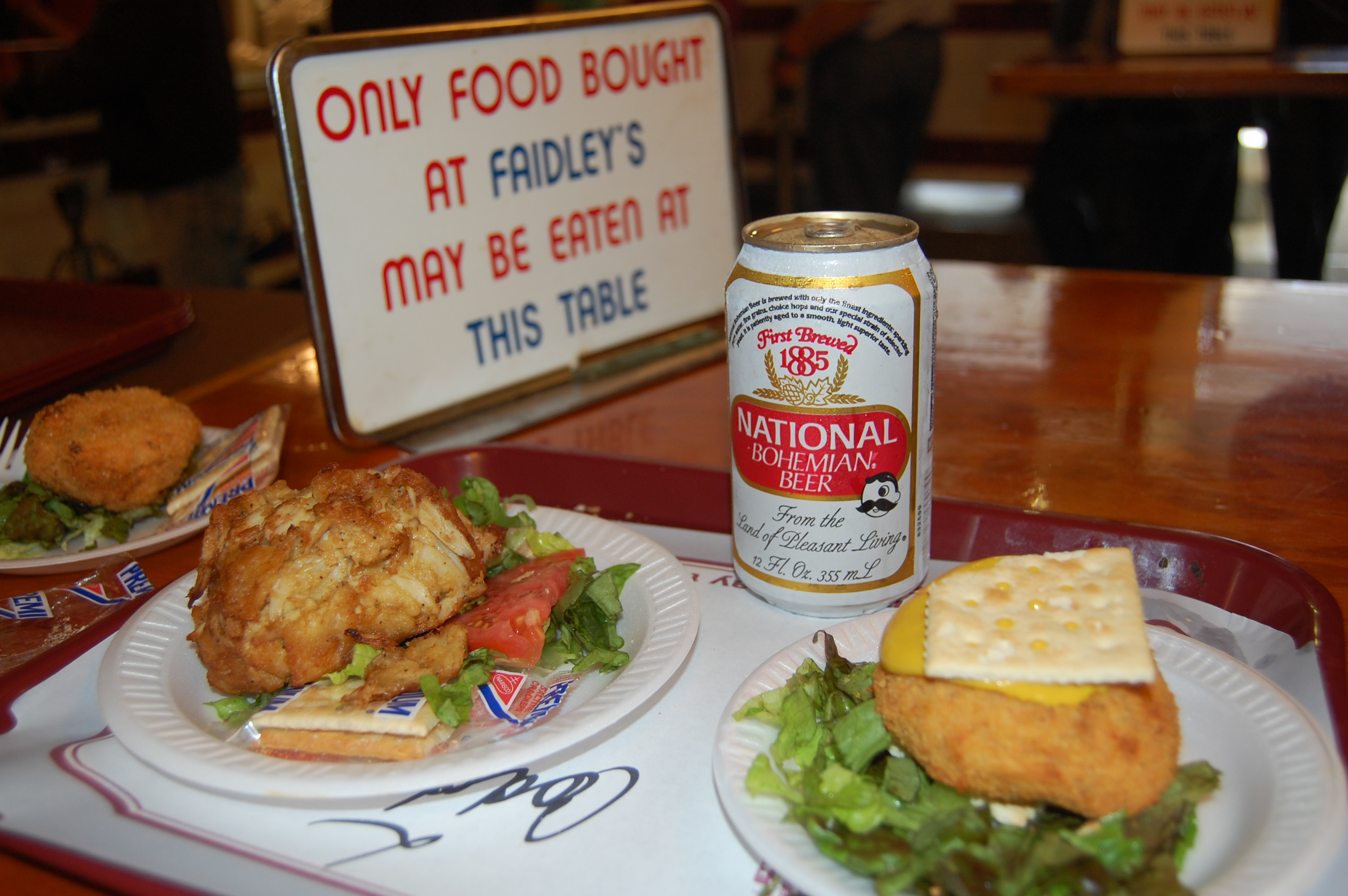

Coddies are a snack food of disputed origin which are largely popular in the mid-Atlantic region of the United States, particularly in Baltimore, Maryland. The typical recipe for coddies includes mashed potatoes, eggs, salt, pepper, onions, crushed up saltine crackers, all formed into a patty with breading and deep fried. They also may include a small amount of salted cod fish. Coddies are usually eaten sandwiched between saltines with yellow mustard. The food is somewhat of a local delicacy in Baltimore, and is commonly served in the city's delicatessens and seafood markets, including the historic Lexington Market.

Where coddies come from originally is unknown. One recipe dates back to the Czech region of Bohemia in the 1800s. Another theory traces them back to African-American slaves in the region during the same time period. However, they did not become available commercially until a Jewish merchant in Baltimore named Louis Cohen began selling them from a Bel Air market ice cream stand in 1910. The Cohen family then continued selling coddies from their own food stands until the 1970s.

Despite limited availability these days, coddies were more widely sold in the Baltimore area throughout the 20th century. Locals recount that they used to be sold everywhere from drugstores to bowling alleys, and they were usually very cheap (sold for as little as a nickel during the 1960s). In fact, due to their cheap prices, coddies have been coined with the nickname "the poor man's crab cake", in reference to another Baltimore staple.

Although they are more of a vintage snack, recipes for coddies can still be found on the Internet, and have even been featured in the Baltimore Sun. They are regarded by many Maryland locals as an important part of Baltimore's culture.

== See also ==
Bolinhos de bacalhau, also known as pastéis de bacalhau, a Portuguese codfish fritter similar to coddies.
