= Pataniscas =

Typical Portuguese dish

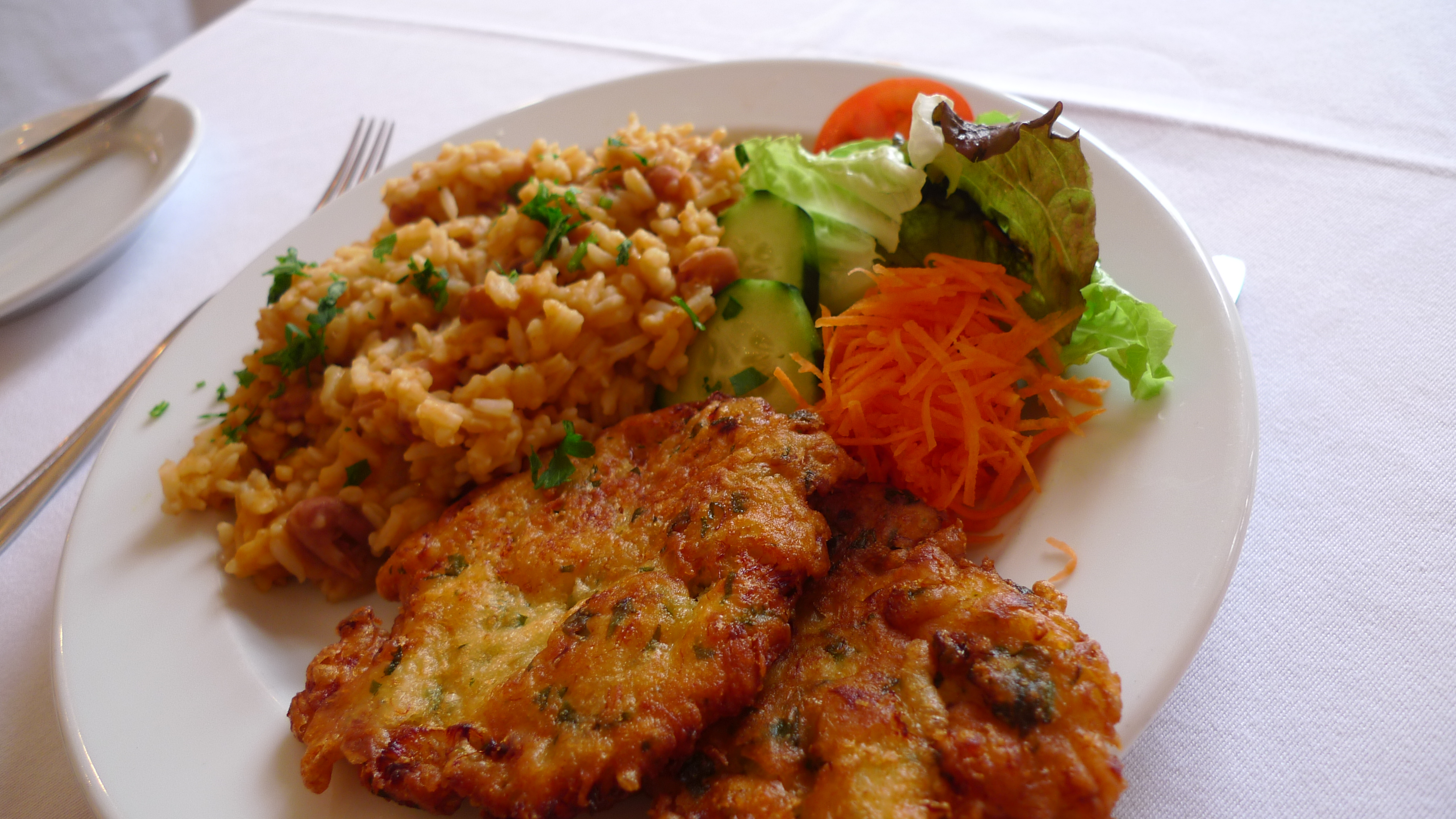
- Pataniscas served with rice and salad
- Course: Appetizer, main
- Place of origin: Portugal
- Region or state: Estremadura

A patanisca (isca in Porto) is a typical Portuguese dish. It is usually made by frying shredded bacalhau (patanisca de bacalhau) in a wheat flour, onion and egg purée, condimented with salt, parsley or pepper. Today, different recipes also include other types of fish (such as tuna), seafood or vegetarian alternatives.

Pataniscas are approximately 8–12 cm (3.1–4.7 in) in diameter, but their shape is irregular and may be flat or spherical.
