= Ephemeral Museum =

Art museum in Lisbon, Portugal

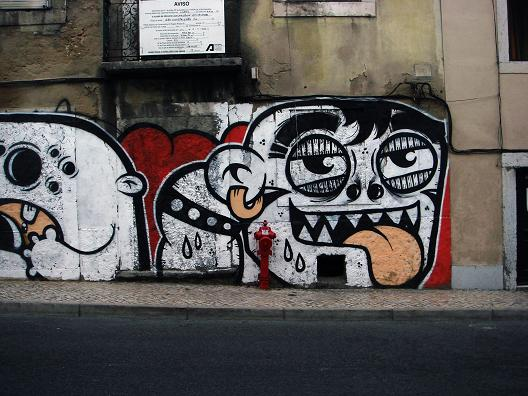

The Ephemeral Museum is an ephemeral art museum located in Bairro Alto, Lisbon, Portugal. It is supported by the Pampero Fundación and is part of the Pampero Rum campaign, developed by the Leo Burnett Lisboa advertising agency.

The concept originated from Leo Burnett's marketing plan for Pampero rum, aiming to create a platform to recognize and appreciate the work of street artists. The first location opened in Bairro Alto, Lisbon's Bohemian quarter, in July 2008. Due to its immediate success, additional locations were subsequently established in Sao Bento and Amoreiras.

The Bairro Alto site showcases the artwork of renowned international artists such as Dolk and Jef Aerosol, as well as local emerging talents like Efeito Magenta and O Colectivo Bitmap. At the São Bento and Amoreiras venues, visitors can view works by acclaimed artists including Exas, Creyz, Rote, Eko and Mito, Time, Pariz, Youth, From the Cave, Mace, and the internationally recognized Kenor.

The selection process for exhibited artworks involves a thorough evaluation of street art forms such as graffiti, stencils, and stickers. The aim is to distinguish genuine art from acts of vandalism. Each artwork is meticulously identified and cataloged, including details about the artist and the title. The Ephemeral Museum does not encourage graffiti creation or acts of vandalism typically associated with street art. Instead, the initiative seeks to provide a platform that acknowledges and displays street art as an independent and legitimate form of expression, akin to the approach taken by the Tate Modern Museum in London.
