= Dried and salted cod =

Preserved fish

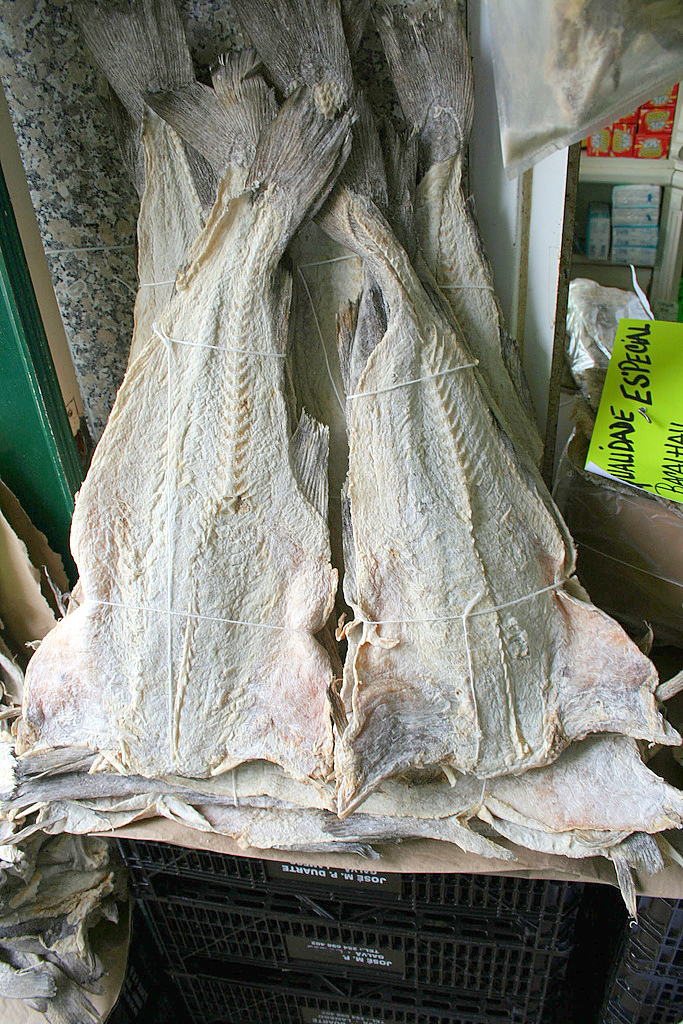
Salt-dried cod for sale in Porto, Portugal

Dried and salted cod, sometimes referred to as salt cod or saltfish or salt dolly, is cod which has been preserved by drying after salting. Cod which has been dried without the addition of salt is stockfish. Salt cod was long a major export of the North Atlantic region, and has become an ingredient of many cuisines around the Atlantic and in the Mediterranean.

Dried and salted cod has been produced for over 500 years in Newfoundland, Iceland, and the Faroe Islands. It is also produced in Norway, where it is called klippfisk, literally "cliff-fish". Traditionally, it was dried outdoors by the wind and sun, often on cliffs and other bare rock-faces. Today, klippfisk is usually dried indoors with the aid of electric heaters. But in western and northern Norway fish is still dried outdoors, mainly for export to southern Europe markets.

== History ==
Salt cod formed a vital item of international commerce between the New World and the Old, and formed one leg of the so-called triangular trade. Thus, it spread around the Atlantic and became a traditional ingredient not only in Northern European cuisine, but also in Mediterranean, West African, Caribbean, and Brazilian cuisines.

The drying of food is the world's oldest known preservation method, and dried fish has a storage life of several years. Traditionally, salt cod was dried only by the wind and the sun, hanging on wooden scaffolding or lying on clean cliffs or rocks near the seaside.

Drying preserves many nutrients, and the process of salting and drying codfish is said to make it tastier. Salting became economically feasible during the 17th century, when cheap salt from Southern Europe became available to the maritime nations of Northern Europe. The method was cheap, and the work could be done by the fisherman or his family. The resulting product was easily transported to market, and salt cod became a staple item in the diet of the populations of Catholic countries on 'meatless' Fridays and during Lent.

Newfoundland lacked the cold dry weather necessary to make stockfish and the plentiful salt required to make Portuguese-style salted fish. Instead, they developed a hybrid approach of lightly salted fish dried in a milder climate. In Norway, this was first known as "terranova fisk" (Newfoundland fish) but came to be known as klippfisk (rock fish) for the rocky coasts where it was (and still is) produced.

The British also developed a system of drying cod from the Grand Banks of Newfoundland during the summer, which was called "habardine" or "poor john".

== Names ==
In Middle English, dried and salted cod was called haberdine. Dried cod and the dishes made from it are known by many names around the world, many of them derived from the root bacal-, itself of unknown origin. Explorer John Cabot reported that it was the name used by the inhabitants of Newfoundland. Some of these are: bacalhau (salgado) (Portuguese), bacalao salado (Spanish), bacallau salgado (Galician), bakailao (Basque), bacallà salat i assecat or bacallà salat (Catalan), μπακαλιάρος, bakaliáros (Greek), Klippfisch (German), morue salée (French), baccalà (Italian), bacałà (Venetian), bakalar (Croatian), bakkeljauw (Surinamese Dutch), bakaljaw (Maltese), makayabu (Central and East Africa), Okporoko (Igbo-Nigeria) and kapakala (Finnish). Other names include ráktoguolli/goikeguolli (Sami), klipfisk (Danish) klippfisk/kabeljo (Swedish), stokvis/klipvis (Netherlandish Dutch), saltfiskur [ˈsal̥tˌfɪskʏr̥] (Icelandic), morue (French), and saltfish (Anglophone I Caribbean).

== Process ==
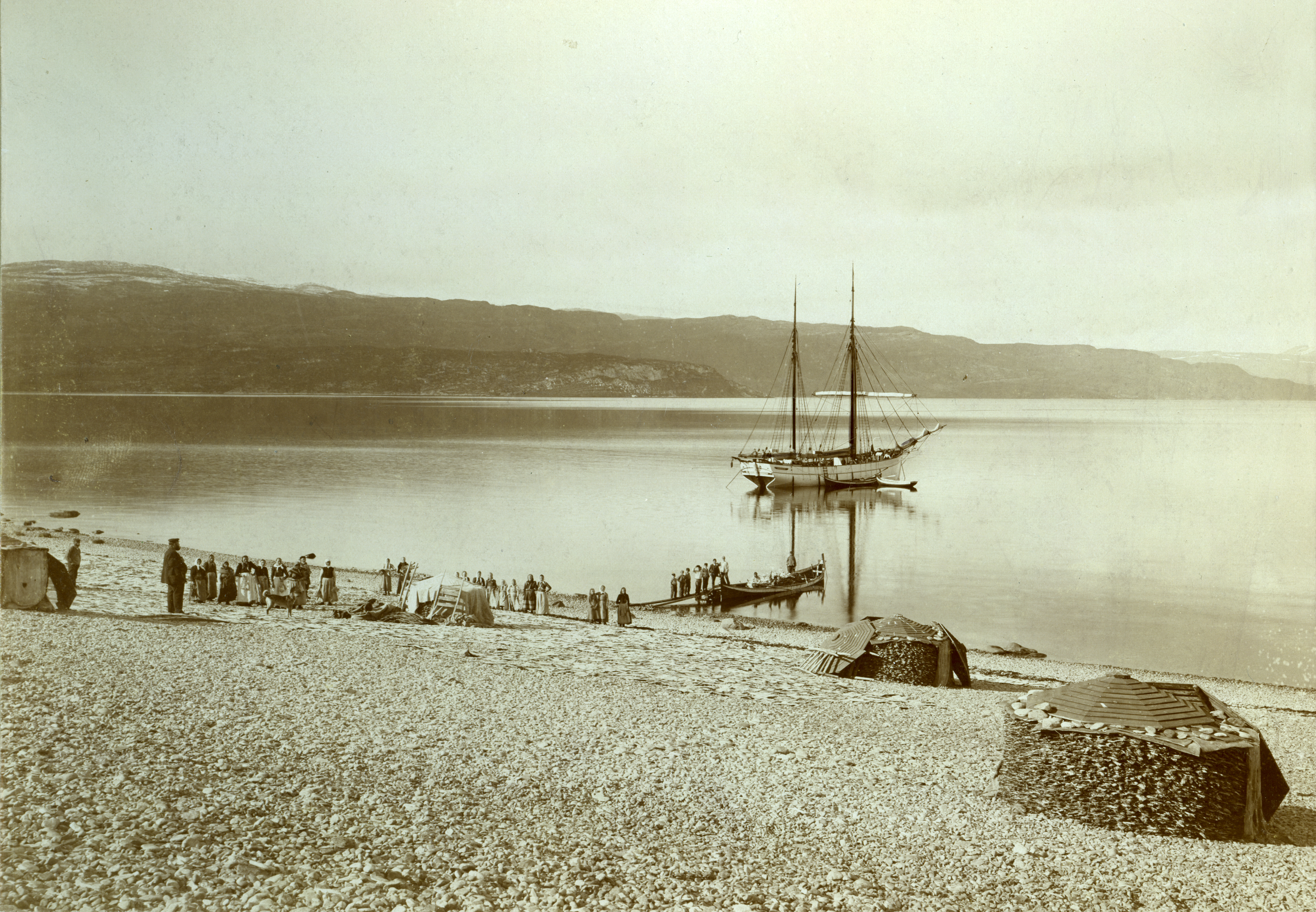
Piles of salt dry cod in Alta, Norway, 1907

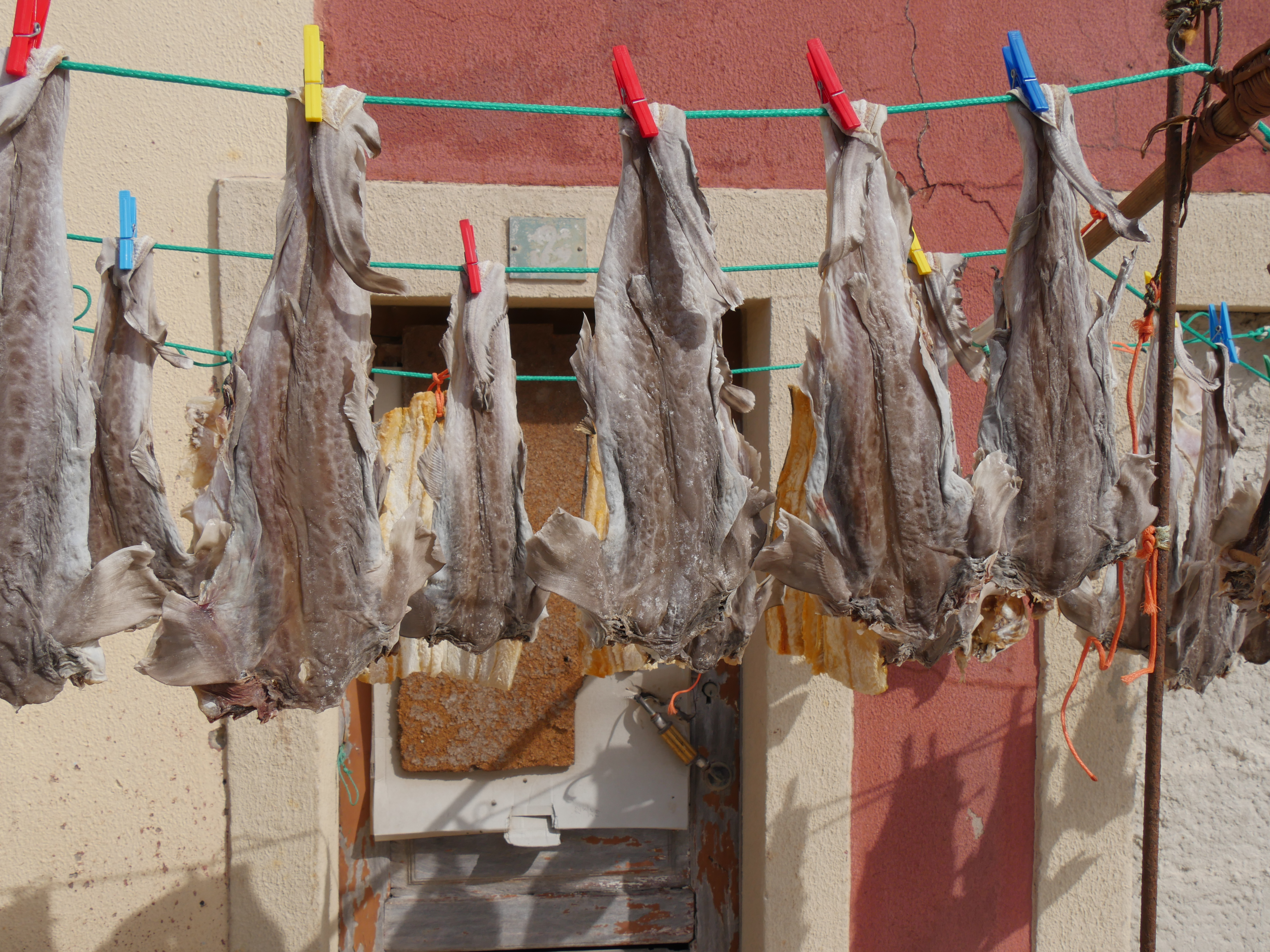
Portuguese bacalhau sundrying in Peniche, Portugal

The fish is beheaded, eviscerated and cut flat by removing the spine, often on board the boat or ship (this is feasible with whitefish, whereas it would not be with oily fish). It is then salted and dried ashore. Traditionally the fish was sun-dried on rocks or wooden frames, but modern commercial production is mainly dried indoors with electrical heating. It is sold whole or in portions, with or without bones.

=== Species of fish ===
Prior to the collapse of the Grand Banks (and other) stocks due to overfishing, salt cod was derived exclusively from Atlantic cod. Since then products sold as salt cod may be derived from other whitefish, such as pollock, haddock, blue whiting, ling and tusk. In South America, catfish of the genera Pseudoplatystoma are used to produce a salted, dried and frozen product typically sold around Lent.

=== Quality grades ===
In Norway, there used to be five different grades of salt cod. The best grade was called superior extra. Then came (in descending order) superior, imperial, universal and popular. These appellations are no longer extensively used, although some producers still make the superior products.

The best klippfisk, the superior extra, is made only from line-caught cod. The fish is always of the skrei, the cod that once a year is caught during spawning. The fish is bled while alive, before the head is cut off. It is then cleaned, filleted and salted. Fishers and connoisseurs alike place a high importance in the fact that the fish is line-caught, because if caught in a net, the fish may be dead before caught, which may result in bruising of the fillets. For the same reason it is believed to be important that the klippfisk be bled while still alive. Superior klippfisk is salted fresh, whereas the cheaper grades of klippfisk might be frozen first.

Lower grades are salted by injecting a salt-water solution into the fish, while superior grades are salted with dry salt. The superior extra is dried twice, much like cured ham. Between the two drying sessions, the fish rests and the flavour matures.

== Culinary uses ==
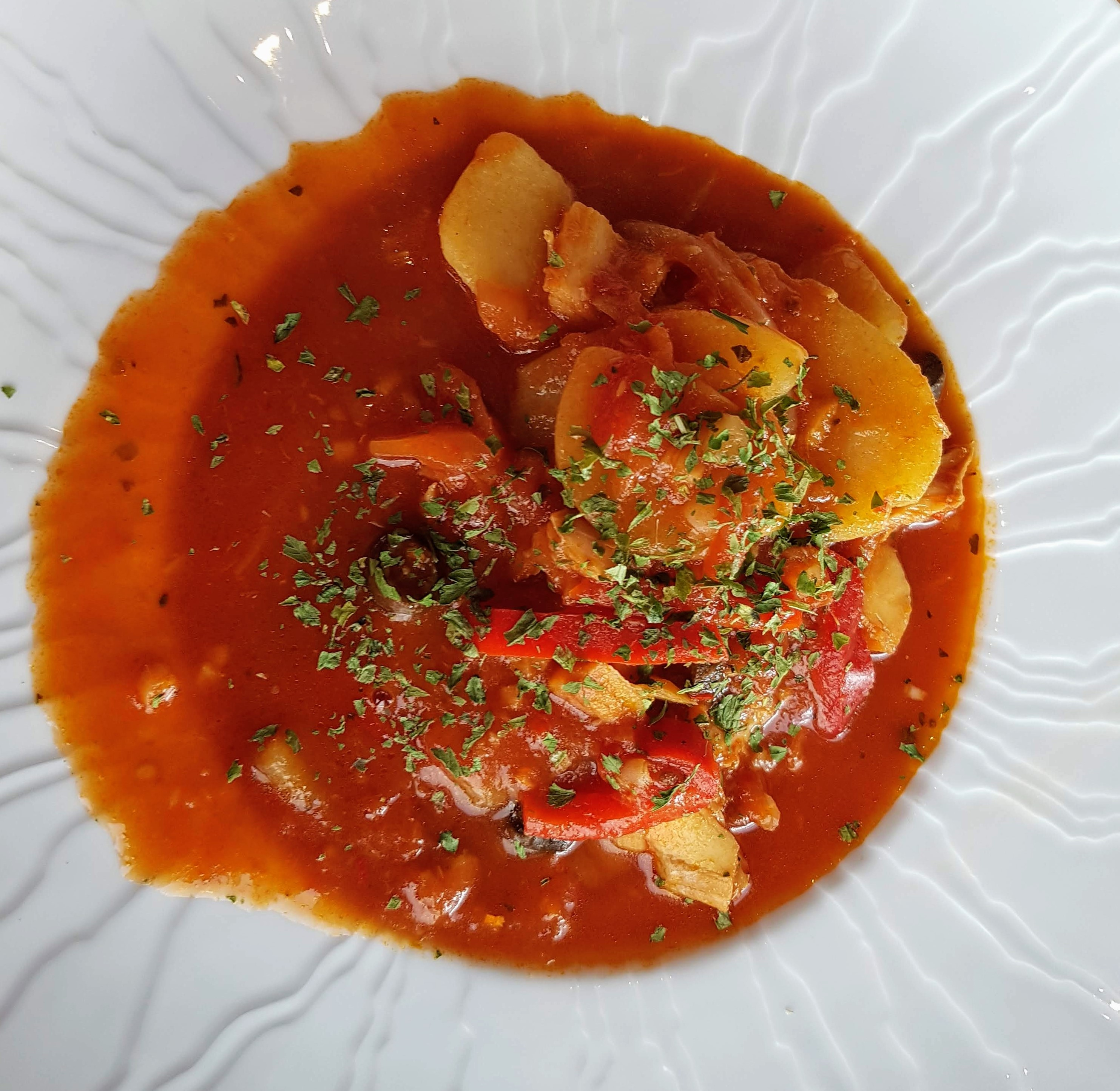
Cod bacalao served at a restaurant in Norway

Before it can be eaten, salt cod must be rehydrated and desalinated by soaking in cold water for one to three days, changing the water two to three times a day.

In Europe, the fish is prepared for the table in a wide variety of ways, most commonly with potatoes and onions in a casserole, as croquettes, or as battered, deep-fried pieces. In France, brandade de morue is a popular baked gratin dish of potatoes mashed with rehydrated salted cod, seasoned with garlic and olive oil. Some Southern France recipes skip the potatoes altogether and blend the salted cod with seasonings into a paste. many recipes are found in France, like Grand aïoli, Raïto or Gratin de morue. There is a particularly wide variety of salt cod dishes in Portuguese cuisine. In Greece, fried cod is often served with skordalia. There are also numerous, varied specialities in north-eastern Italy. In the south Italian region of Campania, dried and salted cod under the name baccalà is common enough that fish markets have specially designated areas where water is constantly run over the dried fish. It is also sold in supermarkets, already reconstituted, permitting quick domestic preparations wherein it is fried, boiled to make a salad or casserole, or simmered with flavourings.

Salt cod is part of many European celebrations of the Christmas Vigil, and the modern Italian-American Feast of the Seven Fishes.

In several islands of the West Indies, it forms the basis of the common dish saltfish. In Jamaica, the national dish is ackee and saltfish. In Bermuda, it is served with potatoes, avocado, banana and boiled egg in the traditional codfish and potato breakfast. In some regions of Mexico, it is fried with egg batter, then simmered in red sauce and served for Christmas dinner. Salted cod is very popular in Puerto Rico where it is used in many traditional dishes such as bacalaíto, buñuelos de bacalao, cod salad tossed with a variety of ingredients and anchovy caper vinaigrette (serenata de bacalao), cod stewed (bacalao a la Vizcaina) stuffed in coconut arepas, one-pot coconut rice and cod (arroz con bacalao y coco), guanime with coconut stew bacalao, and caldo santo a soup similar to sancocho made with coconut milk and cod. Lares Ice Cream Parlor in Lares, Puerto Rico is known for bacalao ice cream. In the Dominican Republic it is typically stewed in a heavy tomato sauce and oregano base or served on Lent with boiled eggs, potatoes, sliced raw red onion and bell peppers.

Salted cod made its way to Philippines via the Spanish Spanish galleon trade in the form of bacalao or bakalaw, a stew with a tomato and roasted capsicum base special to Holy Week.

In Liverpool, England, prior to the post-war slum clearances, especially around the docks, salt fish was a popular traditional Sunday morning breakfast.

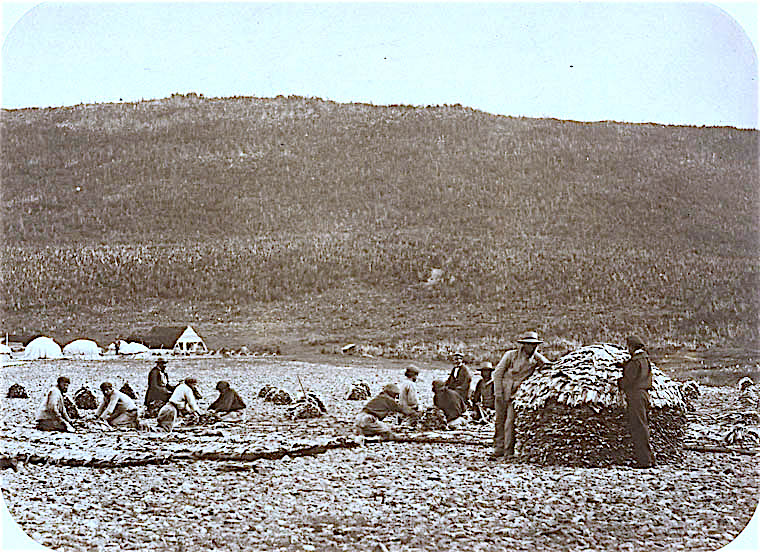
Cod preparation, French fishing station in Cape Rouge, Newfoundland, c. 1857–1859

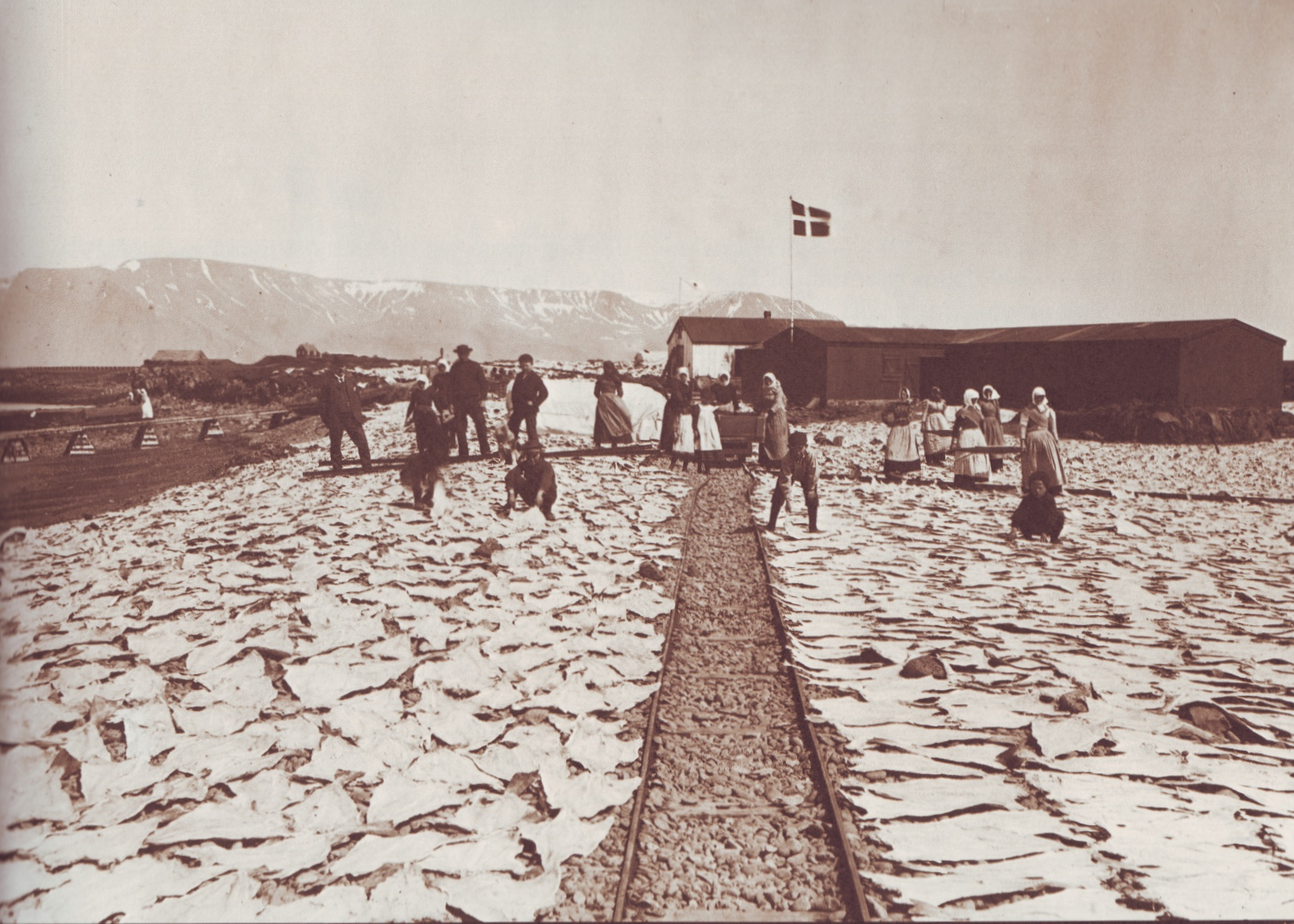
Drying of salt cod in 19th century Iceland

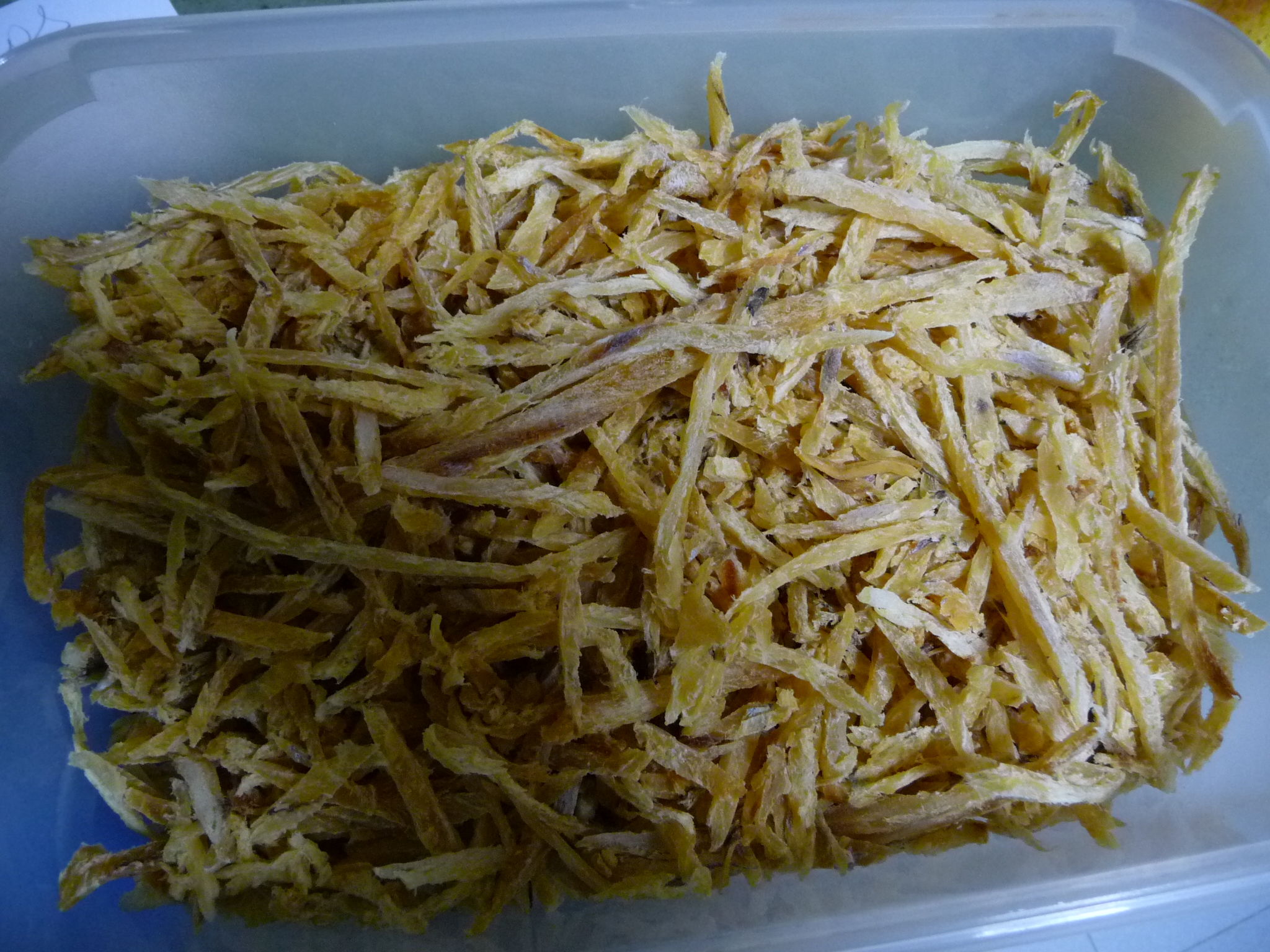
Strips of dried and salted Russian cod

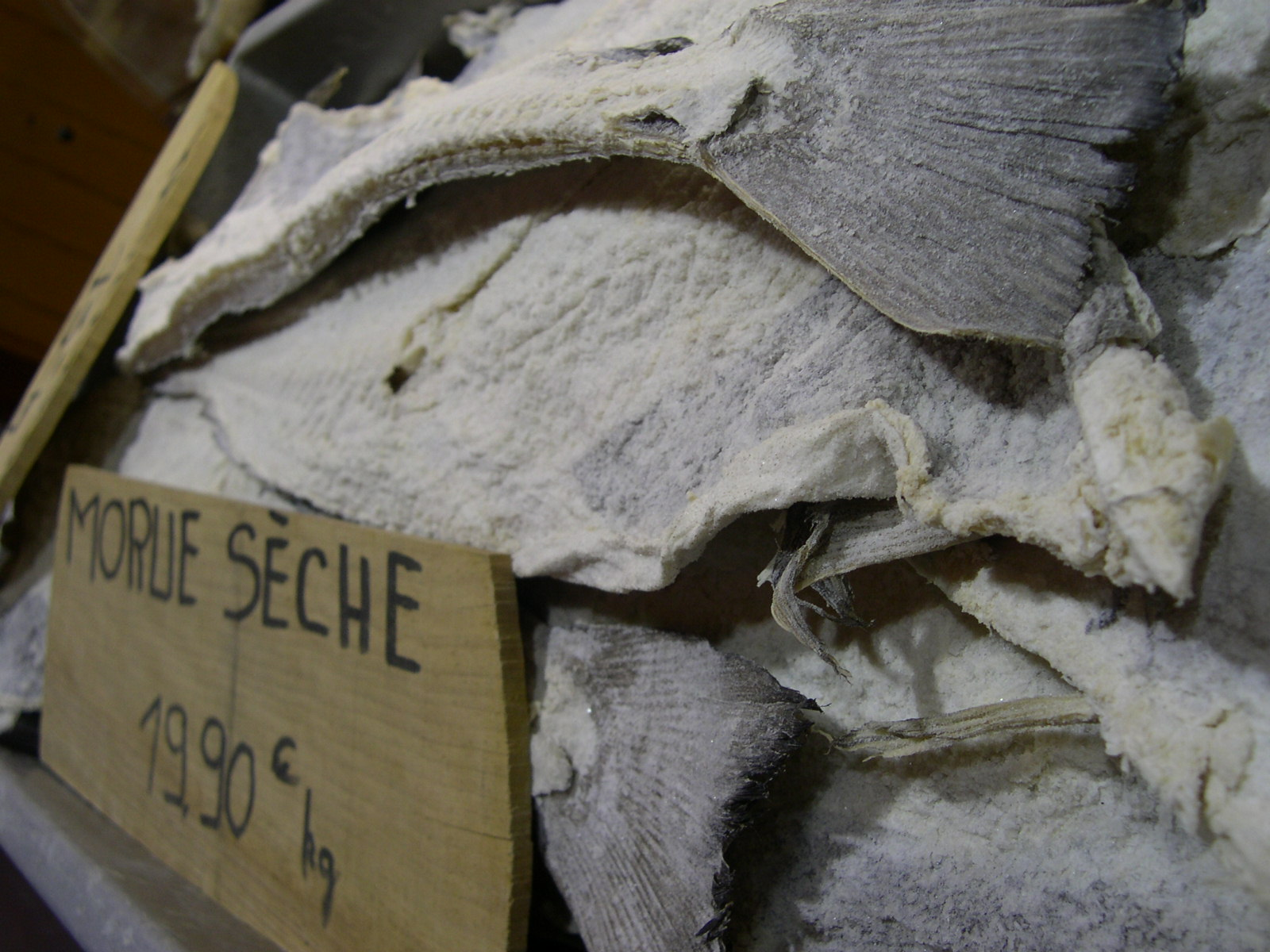
Morue for sale at a Nice market

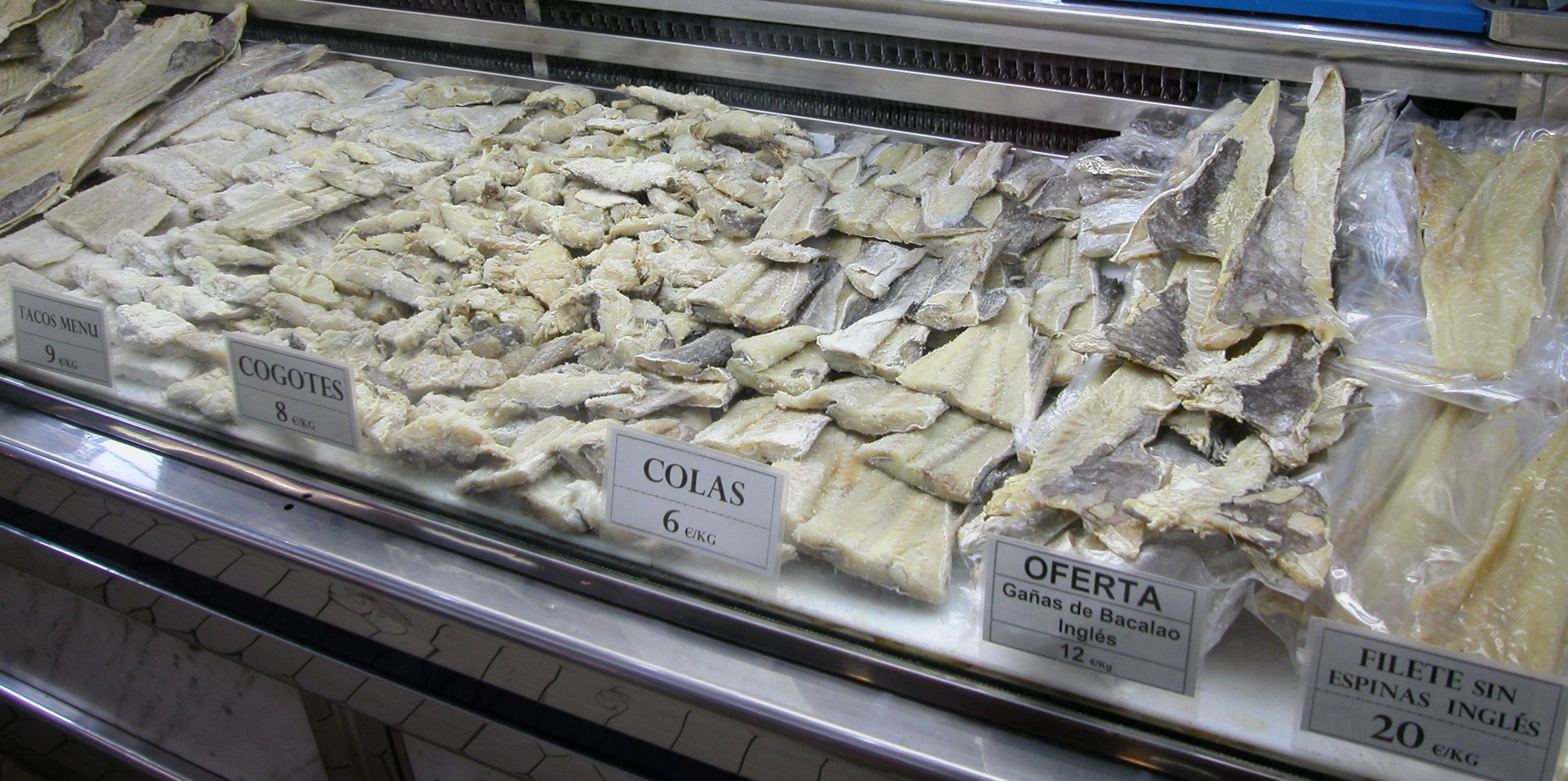
Bacalao for sale at a market in Valencia, Spain

== See also ==
- List of dried foods
- Salted fish
- Fish processing
- Bacalhau – dried and salted cod in Portuguese cuisine
- Stockfish – air-dried unsalted preserved fish
- Ackee and saltfish national dish of Jamaica
- Collapse of the Atlantic northwest cod fishery
