= Bairro Alto =

Coordinates: 38°42′44″N 9°08′42″W

- Neighborhood of Lisbon
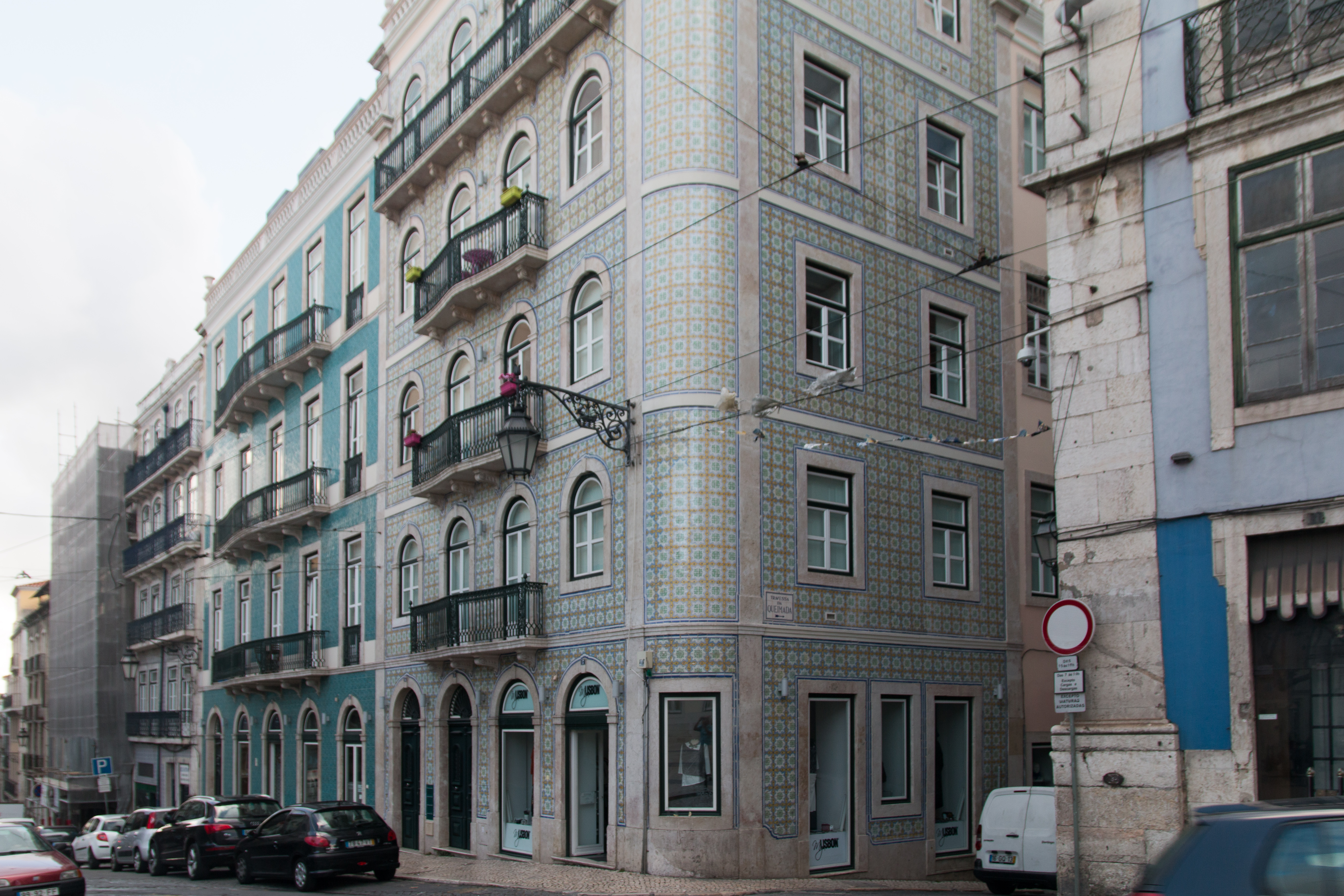
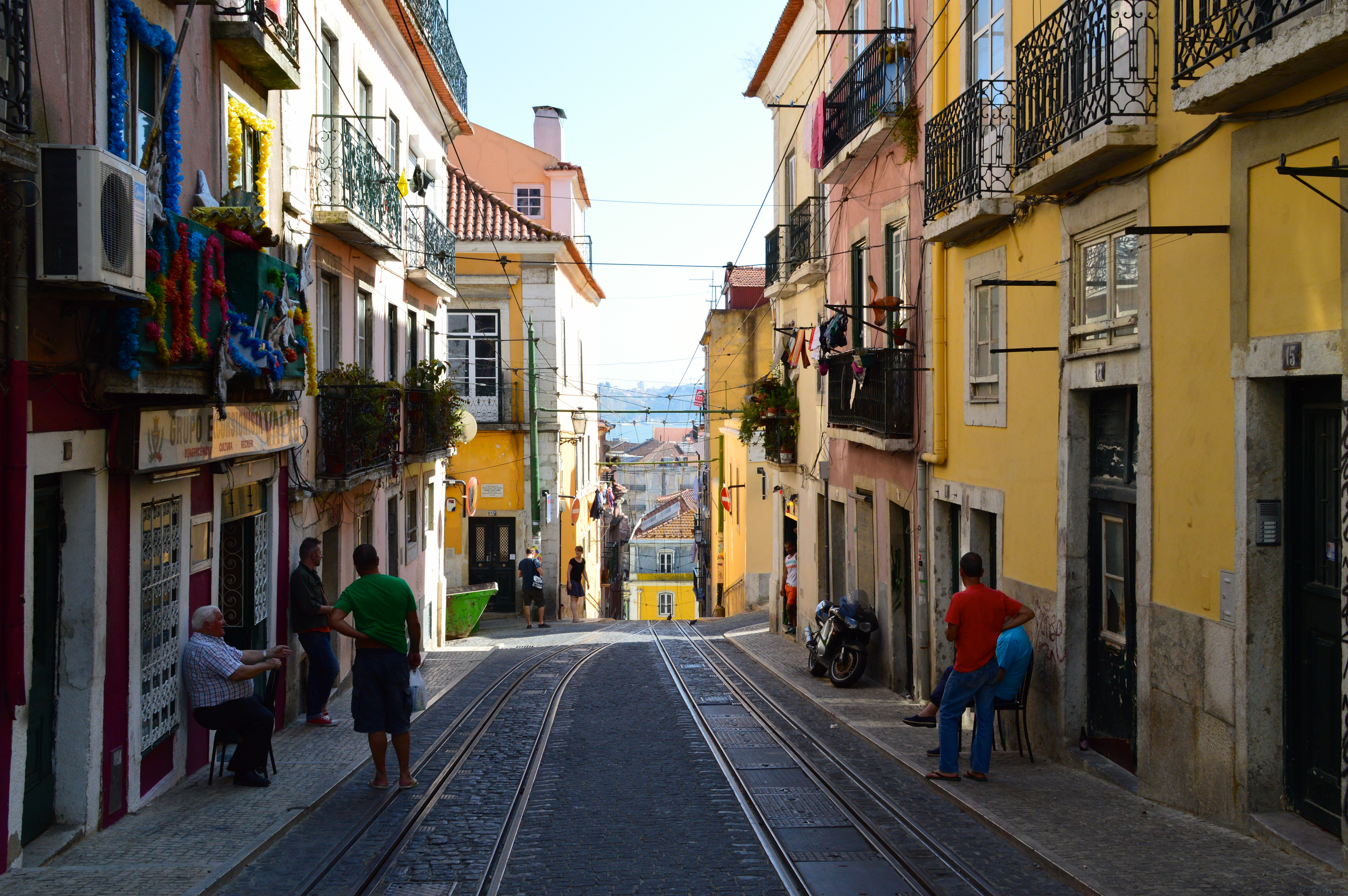
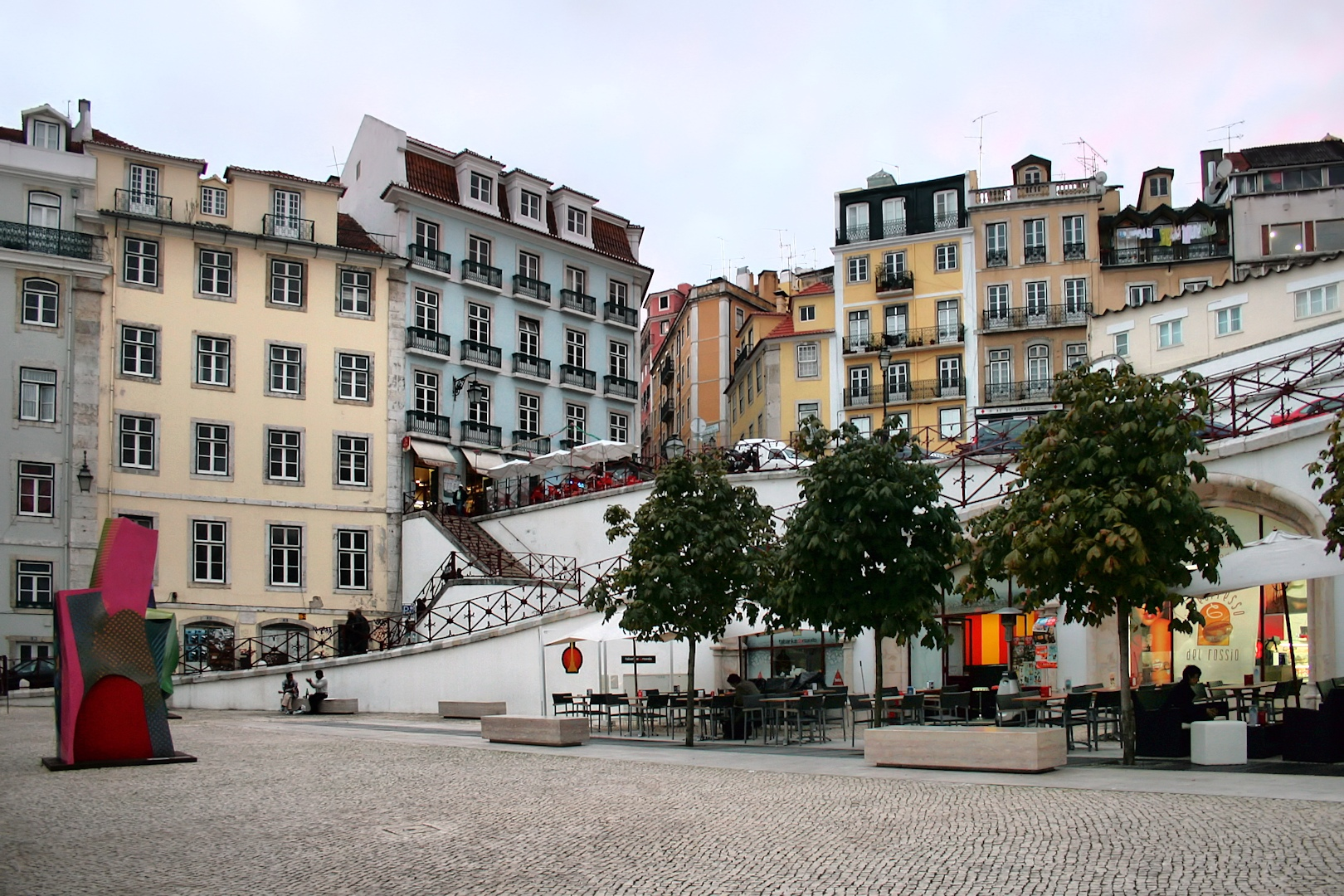
- Interactive map of Bairro Alto
- Municipality: Lisbon
- Freguesia: Misericórdia
- Foundation: 1487

Bairro Alto (Portuguese pronunciation: [ˈbajʁu ˈaltu]; literally: Upper District) is a central district of the city of Lisbon, the Portuguese capital. Unlike many of the civil parishes of Lisbon, this region can be commonly explained as a loose association of neighbourhoods, with no formal local political authority but social and historical significance to the urban community of Lisbon and of Portugal as a whole.

The bairro or "neighbourhood" resulted from urban expansion in the 16th century, forming outside the walls of the historical city, and is characterized by an almost orthogonal tract (developing from two phases of distinct urbanization).

It is a fundamental quarter of Lisbon, organized into a hierarchical scheme of roads and lanes: the roads, the structural axis, run perpendicular to the river; and the lanes, or secondary axis, cut parallel to the river. The matrix of allotments reflects the persistent use of the medieval layout; the division and multiplication of this module had its origin in the variations of the architectural typology. The space constructed is dominated by living spaces implanted in long narrow lots, three to four storeys in height, with asymmetric facades consisting of windows along the various storeys and staircases along the lateral flanks. Although less representative, the Pombaline-era buildings are common, essentially introducing modifications to the level of the façade's composition. Although there are many typological variations to the facade designs, certain elements are repeated, such as the corners, bay and sill windows, eaves and attics, securing a homogeneous urbanized front.

== History ==
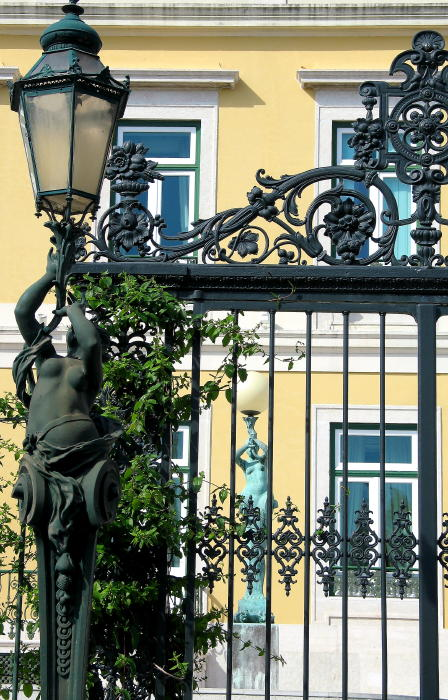
Detail from one of the entrances in the Bairro Alto

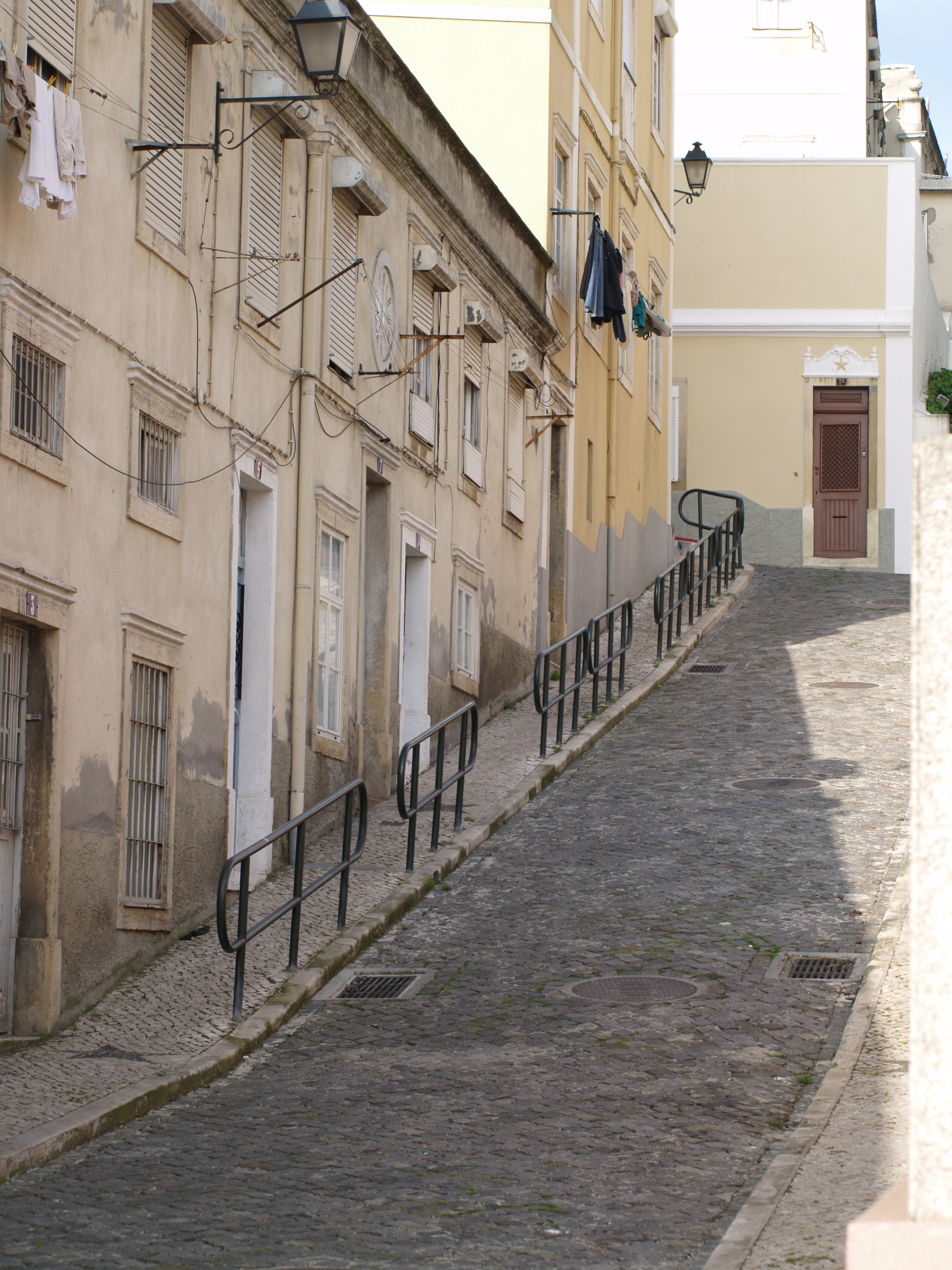
The sloping roadway of the Bairro, near the edge of the old medieval walled city

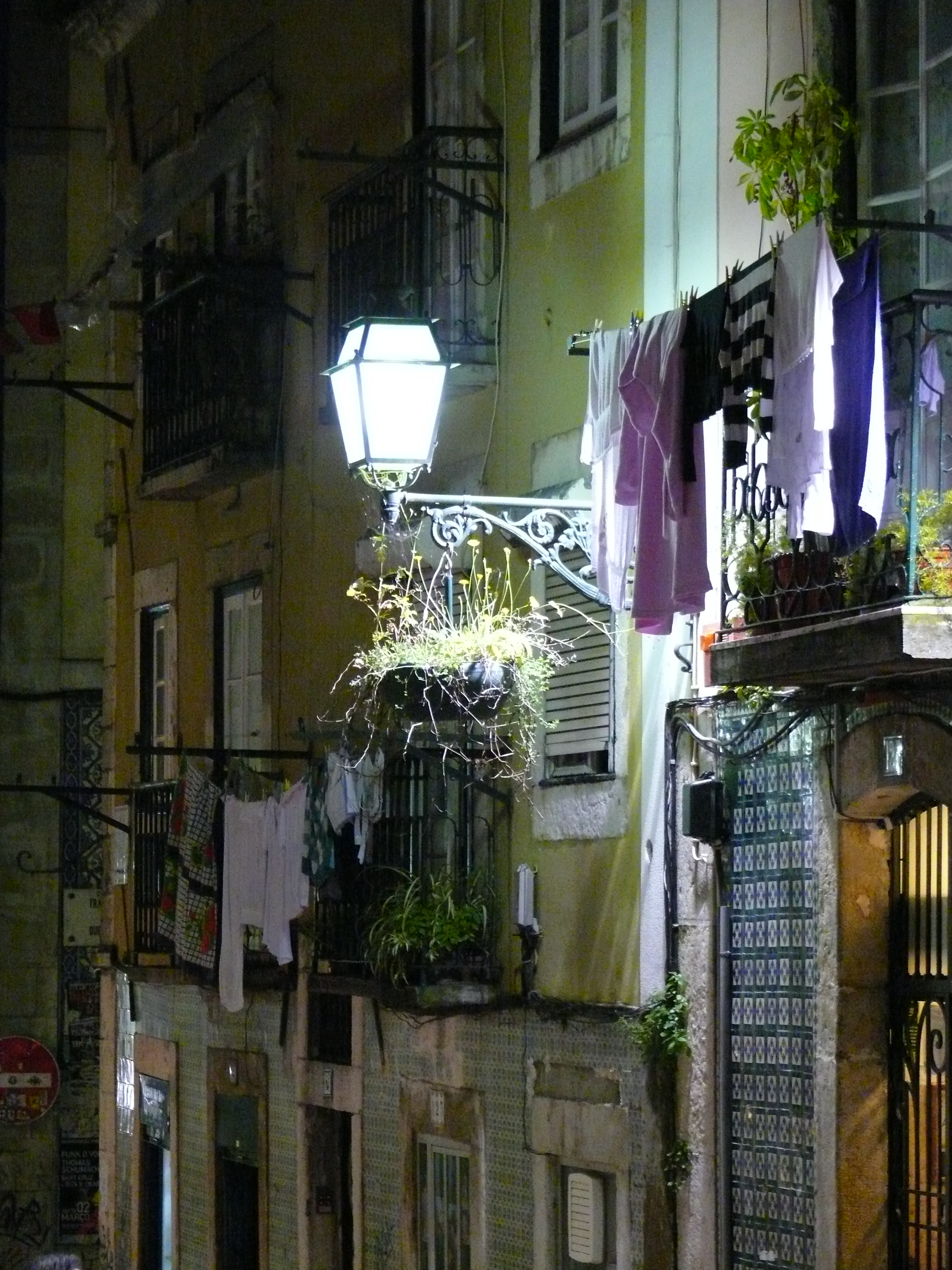
The romanticism of the Bairro, with a mixture of 19th century elements

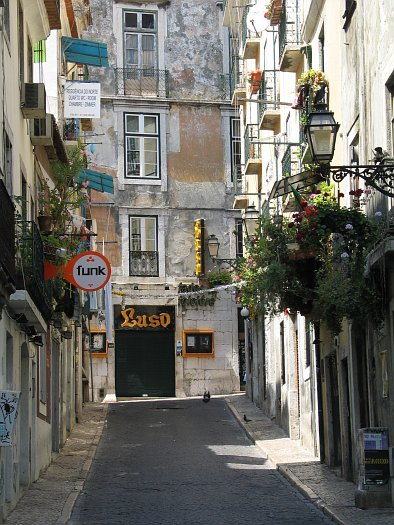
Leading to another intersection in the Bairro of three to four-storey dwellings

The Bairro Alto was born as a response to the social and economic transformation in Lisbon in the second half of the 15th century. Commercial development caused the growth in the population, and an associated expansion of construction within the medieval walled city. It was this phenomenon that resulted in the urbanization process of the Bairro Alto district, in two distinct phases.

The first phase began in 1487, after the death of Guedelha Palaçano, an influential figure in the kingdom: his widow transferred lands situated on the western limit of the city to the King's equerry, Filipe Gonçalves. The land rights for these lands were sold in 1498 to the nobleman Luís de Atouguia.

Between 1499 and 1502 various royal letters, signed by King Manuel, indicated that there was a need to demolish the balconies and verandas that occupied public spaces in the district. This was part of a package of legislative reforms issued to improve the image of the city. A similar royal charter in 1500, was issued with the objective of transforming the free lands that still existed with the old walls. These initiatives lead to the first urbanization, named Vila Nova do Olival (around 1502), situated around the old Convent of the Trinity, using a series of administrative tools and proceedings that would, later, be used in the creation of the Bairro Alto.

In 1505, the construction of the new royal palace, resulted in the move of the Court to the riverfront, and extended the city until the Cais do Sodré.

Around 1513, the first move to divide the lands of the Bairro Alto began, under the approval of Lopo Atouguia. Bartolomeu de Andrade and his wife Francisca Cordovil received permission to section-off plots for the construction of houses. The new urbanization would be designated Vila Nova de Andrade. After the establishment of a grid network of roads, the first houses began to be built, with the majority popping-up south of the Portas de Santa Catarina in 1514. The remainder of the homes also began occupying plots along Rua das Flores, Rua do Cabo, Rua do Castelo, the consecutively named Rua Primeira, Segunda and Terceira, in addition to the Rua da Barroca do Mar. By 1527, there were a total of 408 buildings in the area, totalling 1600 inhabitants.

During the 1530s, the agglomeration began to spread towards the old Estrada de Santos (now the Calçada do Combro), tracing or following to the north of this route, where it encountered Rua da Rosa, Rua da Atalaia, Rua dos Calafates (now Rua Diário de Notícias), Rua das Gáveas, Rua do Norteand Rua de São Roque.

The 1531 earthquake resulted in a need to increase the number of residential homes, speeding the growth of the Bairro.

The first Jesuits arrived in Portugal in 1540.

In 1551, the civil parishes of Mártires and Loreto included 2464 homes and 20132 inhabitants.

The second phase of urbanization in the Bairro Alto began around 1553, with the implantation of the Society of Jesus (Portuguese: Companhia de Jesus) in the civil parish of São Roque, initiating a period of polarized growth, due to their presence. At that time, the zone to the north of Estrada de Santos began being referred to as the Bairro Alto de São Roque. This new phase, growth extended from São Roque until the terrains of the Palace of the Counts of Avintes to the north, limited by the Rua de São Boaventura, Rua do Loureiro, Rua da Cruz and Rua Formosa (now Rua do Século).

In 1559, the civil parish of Santa Catarina was created. Less than a decade later, the Largo de São Roque was formed, and the beginning of the construction of new church and residences of the Society of Jesus were initiated. The enlargement of the route between the Portas de Catarina and Largo de São Roque would occur in 1569, becoming known as the Rua Larga de São Roque.

The civil parish of Encarnação was formed in 1679.

Although the Bairro was not significantly affected by the 1755 Lisbon earthquake, the Marquess of Pombal developed plans to restructure the urban fabric between the Bairro Alto and Baixa, which included standardizing the largos, squares and roads. Between 1760 and 1780, was the beginning of the renovation/remodelling of the roads Rua de São Roque, Rua de Calhariz and Rua do Século, that included the widening of the routes and construction of new buildings.

Around the 19th century, the northern limits of the Bairro, including the zone around São Pedro de Alcântara up to Príncipe Real were delimited. The area was consolidated with the construction of a group of diverse buildings and specifically rental properties. The block that existed between Rua da Rosa and the Travessa do Tijolo came to condition activity in the neighborhood, including the establishment of various newspapers, of which O Bolastill remains. In 1880, the municipal council decided to widen the Rua dos Moinhos do Vento (now the Rua de São Pedro de Alcântara), expropriating lands and buildings that restricted its expansion.

In 1881, lots pertaining to the Count of Soure in the Alto do Longo area of the Bairro were opened to the public. This zone maintained a semi-rural character, with single-storey houses and courtyards, until the alteration of Rua D. Pedro V (the old Estrada da Cotovia), when the construction of four- and five-storey homes came to eliminate these early residences.

In 1887 the Caixa Geral de Depósitos was installed in the Palace of Sobral.

=== Republic ===
The old Travessa da Estrela became known as Rua Luísa Todi in 1917.

In the middle of the 20th century (1945), the Instituto do Vinho do Porto installed itself in the Palace of Ludovice, in a project under the architect Jorge Segurado.

The creation of the Gabinete Técnico do Bairro Alto (Bairro Alto Technical Council) in 1989, and the beginning of a city council policy on urban rehabilitation and renewal. In the last decades of the 20th century, there was a significant socio-cultural dynamic in the area, as a great part of the nightlife became dependent on the restaurants and bars of the quarter. Lisbon's city council made extensive remodelling and repairs to the district, resulting in the opening of new restaurants, clubs and trendy shops. While cars were restricted in the district (except for residents and emergency vehicles), many young people began to live in the Bairro; it is generally a youth-oriented heart of the sub-culture and nightlife of Lisbon.

In 2002 some arteries in the Bairro were restricted to pedestrian traffic.

A 2004 dispatch from the President of the IPPAR, dated 11 November, determined the opening of a process to classify the district as architecturally significant.

From 1 November 2008, many of the bars in Bairro Alto were forced to close their doors at 2:00 a.m., due to noise complaints. However, after 1 August 2009, this restriction was alleviated with an extension to 3:00 a.m., which also included the increase in the number of police officers assigned to the district, to patrol the streets. Around this time, the city council approved a 1.2 million Euro investment project to improve the area's physical appearance and improve security, as well as tackling the excessive graffiti problem.

== Geography ==
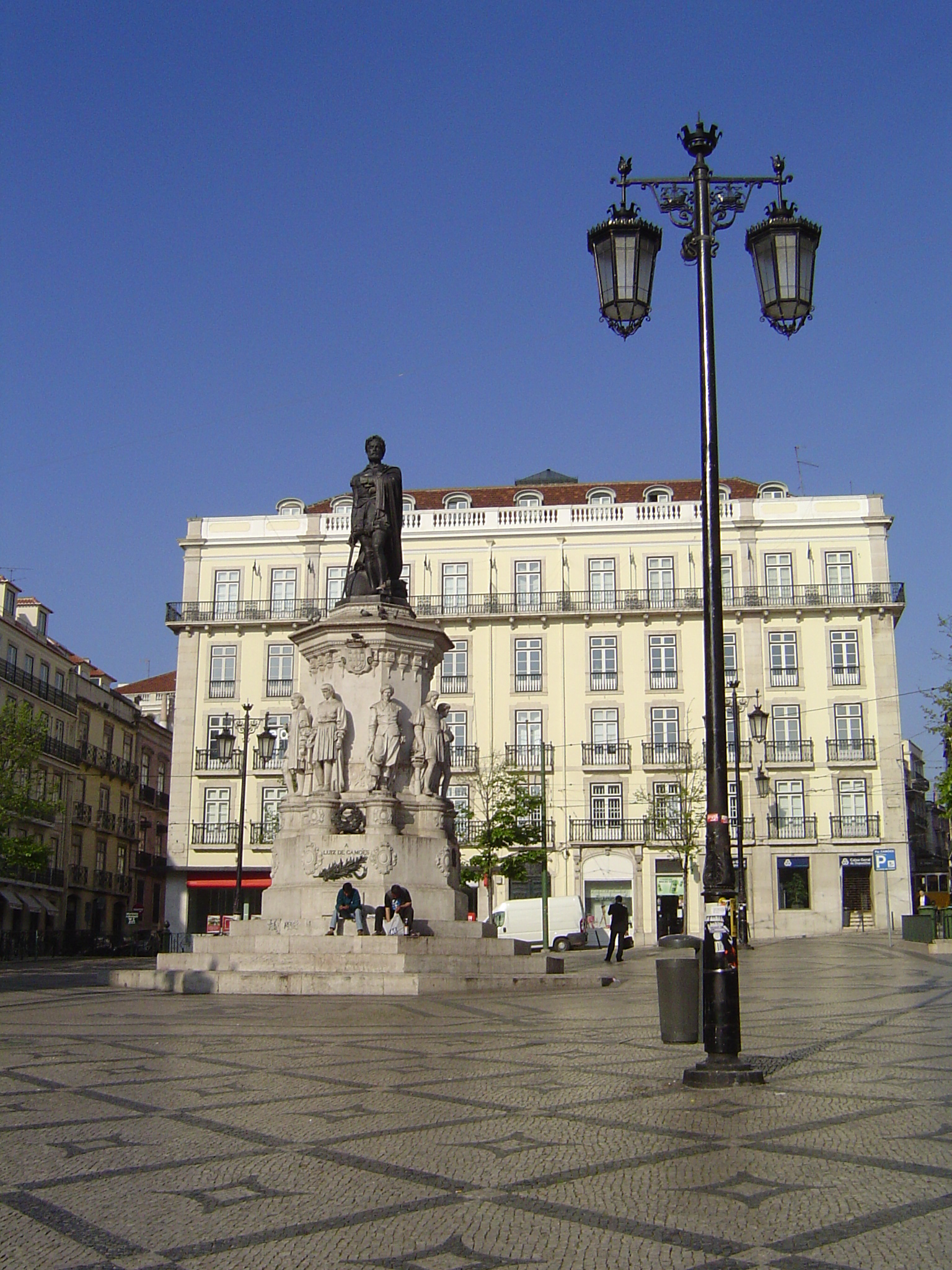
The Praça Luís de Camões near the historical gates of Santa Catarina

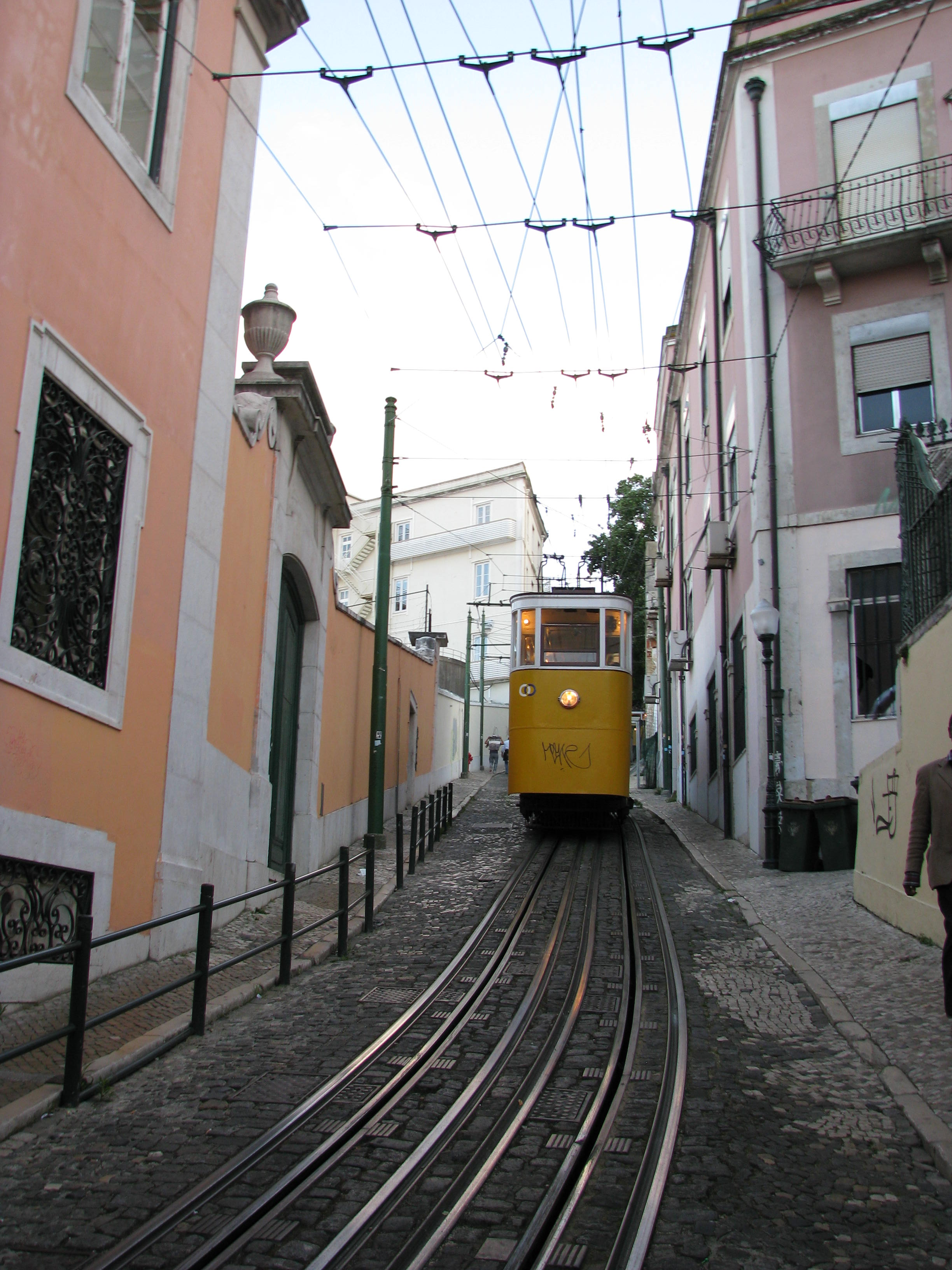
The Ascensor da Glória connecting between the Praça dos Restauradores and Avenida da Liberdade

Although central to Lisbon, it is normally identified by a different urban nucleus. Bairro Alto is characterized by orthogonal blocks, sometimes rectangular, with a proportion of two lots wide by six or eight lots in length, with many of the length dimensions accompanying the roads, while the shorter dimensions following the lanes. This spatial configuration is not fixed completely within the district. For example, north of the Travessa da Queimada, the blocks, although maintaining a rectangular form, are of different dimensions, with the laneway-side representing those of longer length. It is this model that guides the blocks where the majority of the 16th and 17th century buildings are located. In a few cases, there are also meio chão configurations, destined for those of the population with less financial resources. Further, there are rare instances in the district where one lot may encompass an entire block, such as the Palace of Andrade and the Palace Ludovice.

During the Pombaline era, there was an increase in the number of multiple lots with the standard dimensions. The large occupation rate in the 17th and 18th centuries originated in the changes to the dimensions of these blocks. Many of the buildings were expanded, both in height, in addition to size. It is this form that predominates the Bairro, which is highly dense, somber and where only the upper floors are exposed to direct sunlight.

The design of the roadways that run through the Bairro Alto, consists of a hierarchy of structural roads, oriented north to south in the direction of the Tagus River, and secondary lanes, perpendicular to the roads, running east to west. The hierarchy of these routes are homogeneous in scale, with little variation in size in roads or lanes, a characteristic that is missing from the zones adjacent to the Bairro Alto, preserving an intimacy and unique character.

== Architecture ==
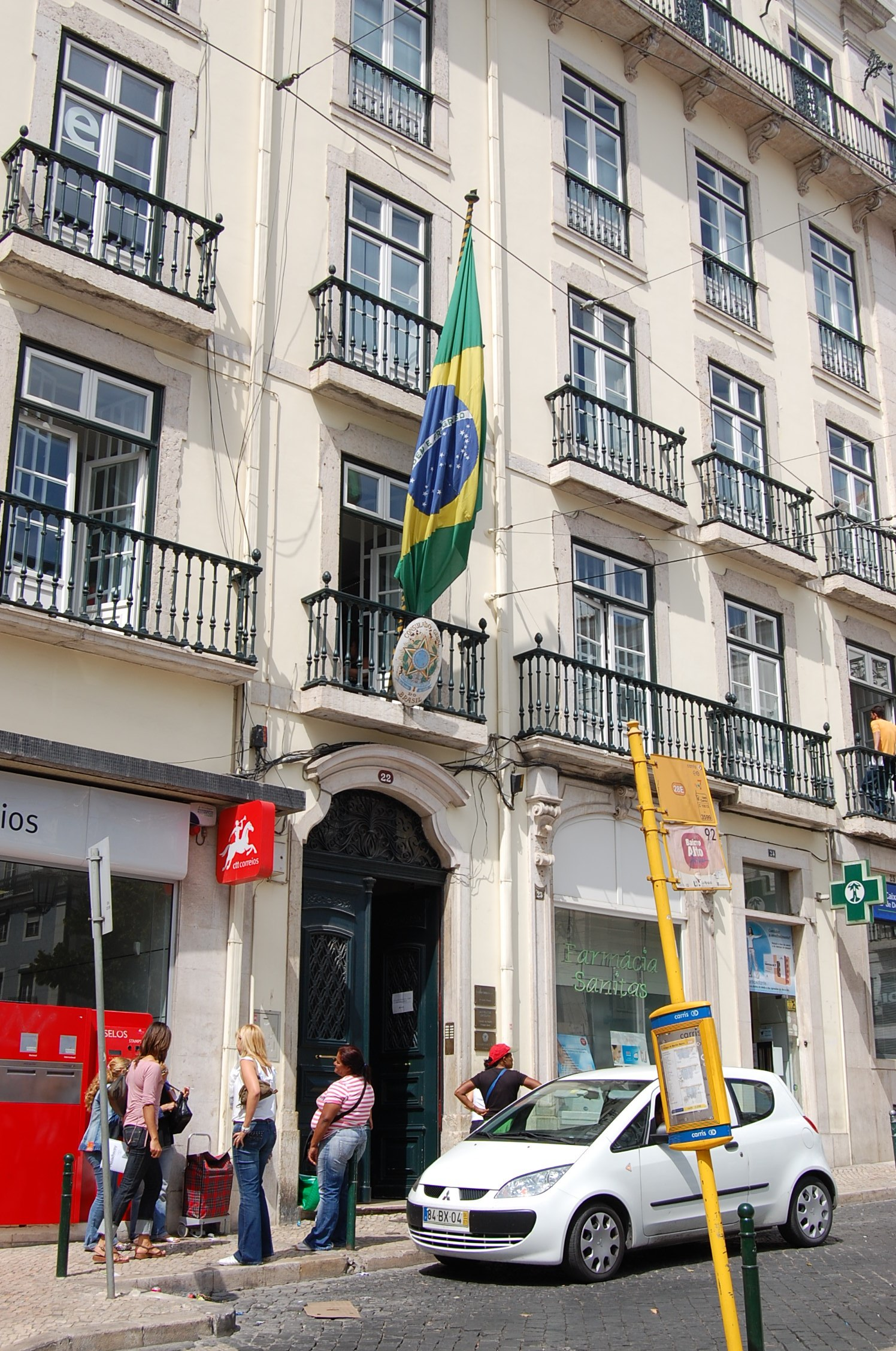
The multi-storey Pombaline-era facade of the Consulate-General of Brazil in the Bairro

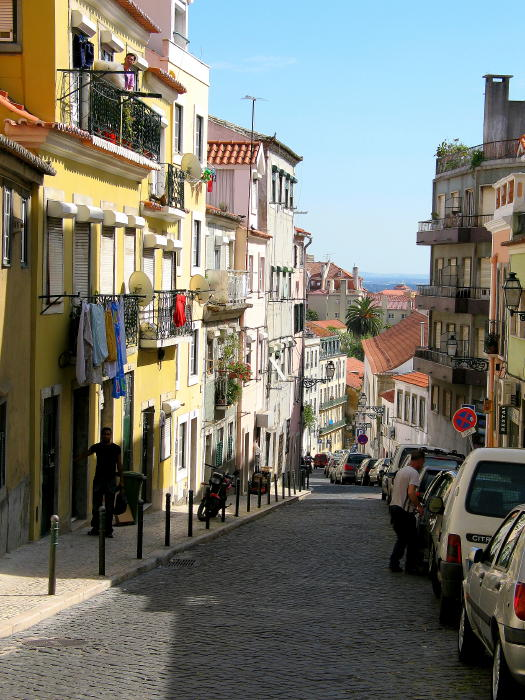
The inclined streets and 3-storey buildings in a typical street

In addition to being formed in an orthogonal layout, the construction in the Bairro Alto used new construction techniques for the time: the transition from buildings built in wood to those completed in stone masonry.

The older homes in the bairro, dating from the 16th and 17th centuries are characteristically two types: low buildings with two storeys (ground and first floor), square, asymmetric with small windows and sills; and buildings that were long and narrow, consisting of three floors with windows, balconies and aligned spans. The first type, from the rural architectural tradition, were generally substituted for the second (which allowed a higher rate of occupation), with examples surviving to this day. The second type, which are more common, are, nonetheless, infrequent (with the exception existing along the Rua da Atalaia). From the natural typological evolution, and growth in the resident population during the 17th century, each of these types served the necessities of its inhabitants, and as a result, there were alterations to the layouts and façades over time.

Although the 1755 earthquake did not result in great damage to the Bairro, there are examples of Pombaline-era frame system employed in some of these buildings. The Pombaline building of the period is characterized by a four-storey block with differentiated windows. The façade is recognized by a symmetry made possible by a central staircase, with two opposite sets, and the windows in the mansard roofs. By the beginning of the 19th century, the Pombaline style gave way to a simplification and enhancement of the Pombaline-era buildings.

While, generally, the gaioleiro-style reinforcement of the buildings is not common, many of the Pombaline buildings were redesigned in keeping with the design aesthetic of the time. The construction of palacettes in this Romanticism style, resulted from a collage of the French aesthetic influences, identified primarily in the north and east of Bairro Alto, and especially in the area of São Pedro de Alcântara, where the Palacete Laranjeiras is the best example. This was a period that emphasized the façade of the buildings, with large verandas. They present a strong characteristic of the façade, with protruding balconies, fine gratings, frame spans over worked masonry and the application of curved lines, especially in the design of courtyards and windows along street corners. At the same time, some buildings were constructed to house workers, organized into villages or in courtyards, such as the Pátio do Tijolo (literally, the Yard of Bricks). These were multi-family buildings, usually two to three storeys in height, with a high occupancy and little space.

Architectural influences from the 20th century are limited, and restricted to a few points.

== See also ==
- Ephemeral Museum, located in Bairro Alto
