= Bacalhau à Zé do Pipo =

Bacalhau casserole

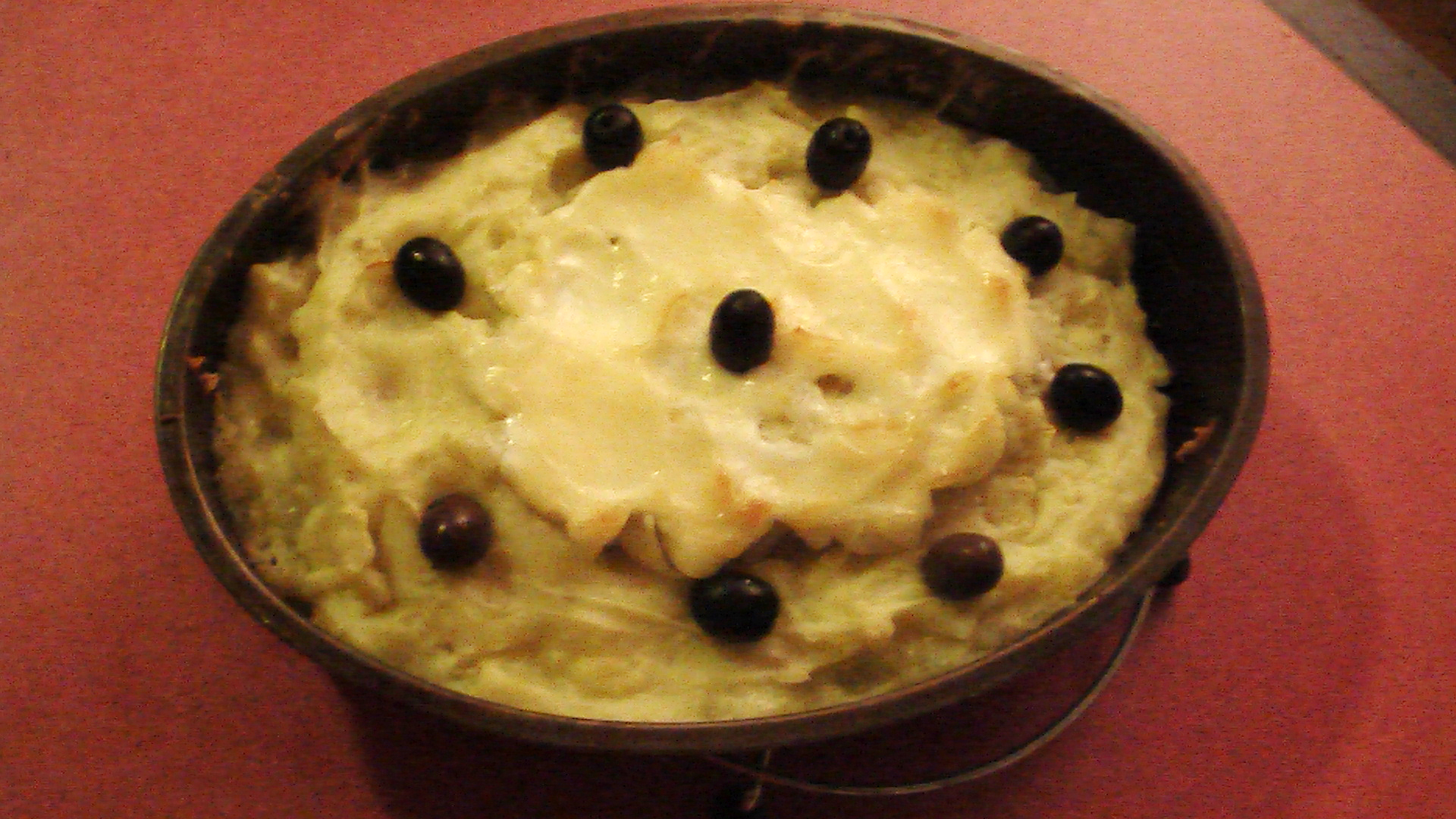
- Place of origin: Porto, Portugal
- Created by: José Valentim (Zé do Pipo)
- Invented: 1960s
- Main ingredients: Bacalhau, mayonnaise, mashed potatoes, onion, milk, olive oil, red bell pepper, bay leaf and olives

Bacalhau à Zé do Pipo (Portuguese pronunciation: [bɐ.kɐˈʎaw a zɛ du ˈpipu], meaning "Bacalhau à la Zé do Pipo") is a common codfish (bacalhau) dish in Portugal. It is an oven baked dish, consisting in layers of bacalhau (previously boiled in milk), onion (or pickles), mashed potatoes with a hint of ground nutmeg, and mayonnaise. Although mayonnaise is not traditionally used in Portuguese cuisine, in this dish it's considered typical. It is usually garnished with olives or peppers. The recipe originates from Porto, having achieved popularity in Vizela, being named after its creator, Zé do Pipo, who owned a famous restaurant in Porto during the 1960s. He won a national gastronomic contest with this main course, making many restaurants adopt it in their menus and popularizing it through the country to this day.

== See also ==
- List of casserole dishes
- Bacalhau com natas
- Bacalhau à Narcisa
- Bacalhau à Brás
- Bacalhau à Gomes de Sá
