= Bacalhau à Gomes de Sá =

Typical fish from Porto, Portugal

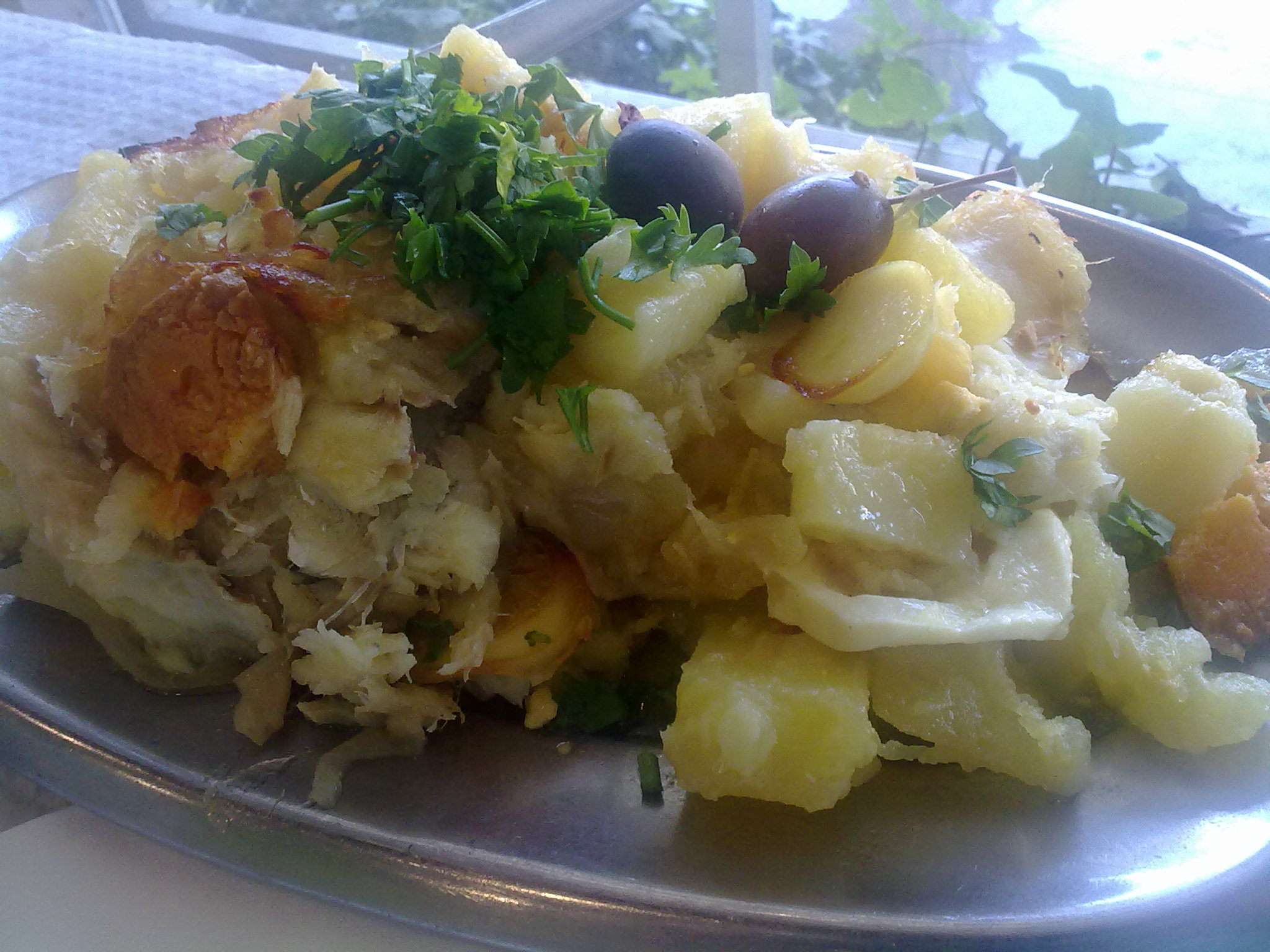
- Place of origin: Porto, Portugal
- Created by: José Luís Gomes de Sá Júnior
- Invented: 19th century
- Main ingredients: Bacalhau, potatoes, eggs, olives, olive oil, and onion

Bacalhau à Gomes de Sá (Portuguese pronunciation: [bɐ.kɐˈʎaw a ˈɡomɨʃ dɨ ˈsa], meaning "Bacalhau à la Gomes de Sá") is a common codfish (bacalhau) dish in Portugal, typical of the city of Porto.

The recipe originates from Porto and is named after its creator, José Luís Gomes de Sá Júnior (1851–1926), a native of the same city, who was a cod merchant in a warehouse on Rua do Muro dos Bacalhoeiros in the Ribeira district of Porto. He sold the recipe to his colleague and close friend João, the chef of the now-defunct Restaurante Lisbonense, located on Travessa dos Congregados in Porto. The original recipe calls for the cod to be cut into small flakes and softened in milk for about one and a half to two hours, then cooked with olive oil, garlic, and onion, and served with black olives, parsley, and boiled eggs.

It is usually served with red Vinho Verde or red Douro wine. It is simple to prepare and relatively quick to make.

Bacalhau à Gomes de Sá was one of the finalist candidates for the 7 Wonders of Portuguese Gastronomy, highlighting its great importance to Portuguese cuisine as well as its gastronomic value in Portugal.

== See also ==
- List of casserole dishes
- Bacalhau com natas
- Bacalhau à Narcisa
- Bacalhau à Brás
- Bacalhau à Zé do Pipo
