= Bacalhau à Narcisa =

Portuguese salt cod dish

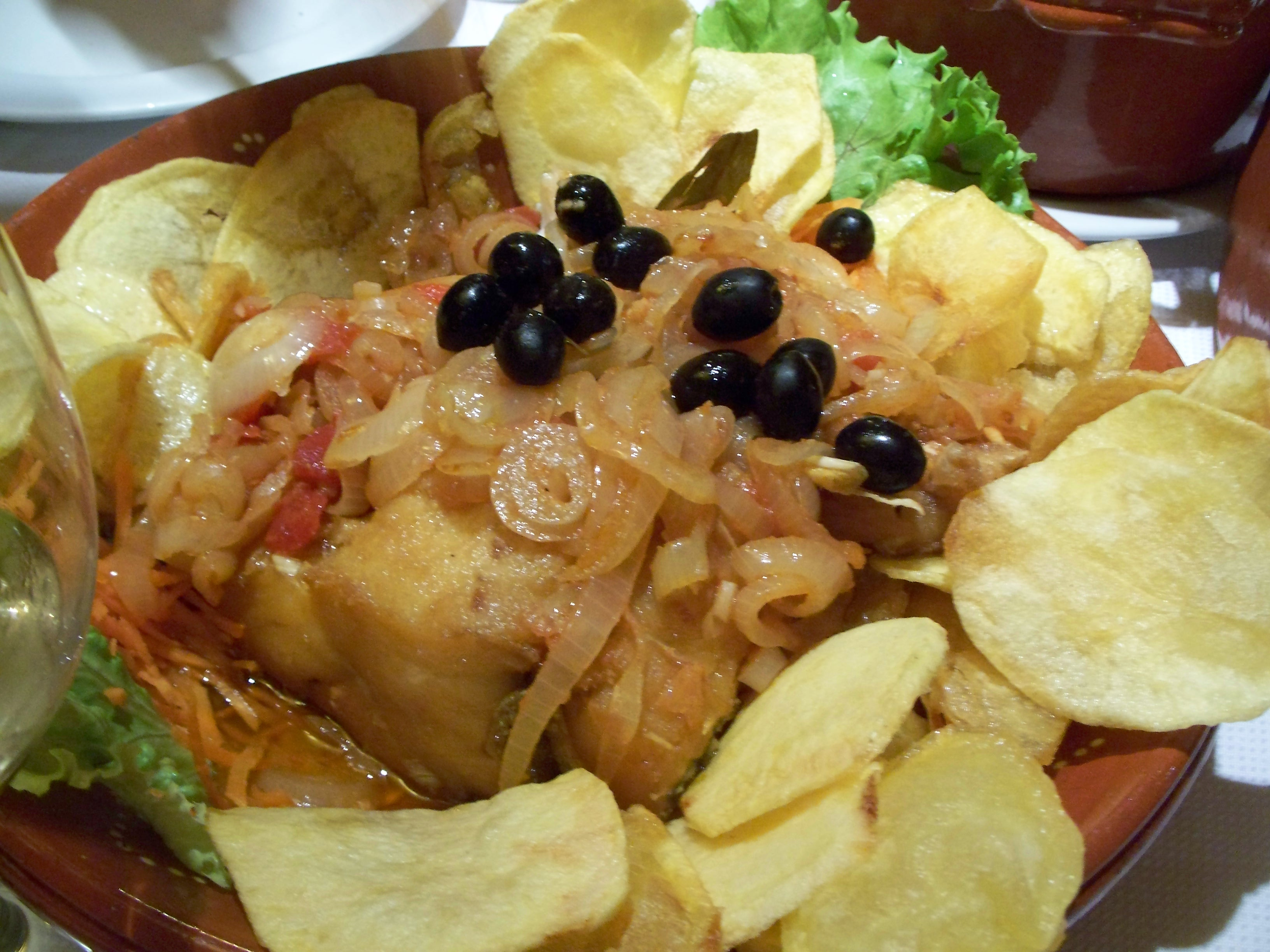
- Alternative names: Bacalhau à minhota Bacalhau à Braga
- Place of origin: Braga, Portugal
- Created by: Dona Eusébia (Note: Dona is a Portuguese honorific similar to "Mrs".)
- Invented: 1940s?
- Main ingredients: Bacalhau, fried potatoes, onion, olive oil, parsley, and olives

Bacalhau à Narcisa (Portuguese pronunciation: [bɐ.kɐˈʎaw a naɾˈsi.zɐ], meaning "salt cod in the style of Narcisa"), also known as bacalhau à minhota or bacalhau à Braga, is a traditional Portuguese cod fish (bacalhau). It consists of fried cod loins, accompanied by thinly sliced potatoes and onions that are fried in the same olive oil as the cod, together with bay leaves and cloves.

It originated in Braga, where it was served in the restaurant of the same name. It gained popularity and was eventually adopted by other restaurants, becoming one of the signature dishes of Minho cuisine.

Despite the name, the recipe was created by Dona Eusébia (who died in 1972), who kept the name of the tavern that had belonged to a certain Narcisa. Due to her advanced age, Narcisa could not continue running the business and handed it over to Dona Eusébia and her husband, Félix Ferreira Valença, in the mid-1930s.

== See also ==
- Bacalhau à Narcisa (restaurant)
- Bacalhau à minhota
- Bacalhau à Gomes de Sá
- Bacalhau à Zé do Pipo
