= Bolinhos de bacalhau =

Traditional Portuguese codfish dish

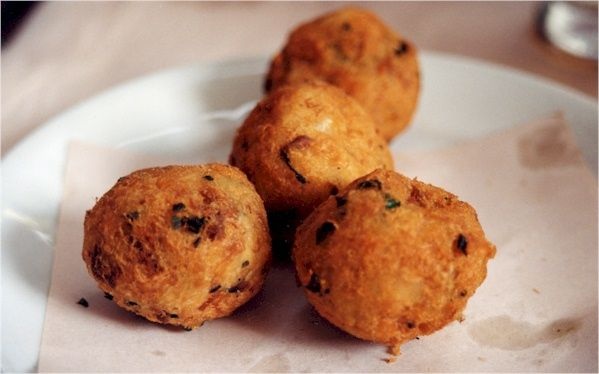
Bolinhos de bacalhau

Bolinhos de bacalhau (Portuguese: [buˈlĩɲuʒ ðɨ βɐkɐˈʎaw], lit. 'codfish cakes') or pastéis de bacalhau (Portuguese: [pɐʃˈtɛjʒ ðɨ βɐkɐˈʎaw], lit. 'codfish pastries') are a traditional Portuguese dish, typically made from a mixture of potatoes, codfish, eggs, parsley, onion and sometimes a hint of nutmeg. They are also commonly referred to as "salt cod fritters" or "salt cod croquettes". These pastries are shaped using two spoons, deep fried and served hot or cold before meals as an appetizer or as a meal itself (usually served with plain or seasoned rice, salad and olives). Ideally, they should be slightly crunchy on the outside and soft and creamy on the inside.

== See also ==
- Coddies
