= Bacalhau =

Type of Portuguese cod dish

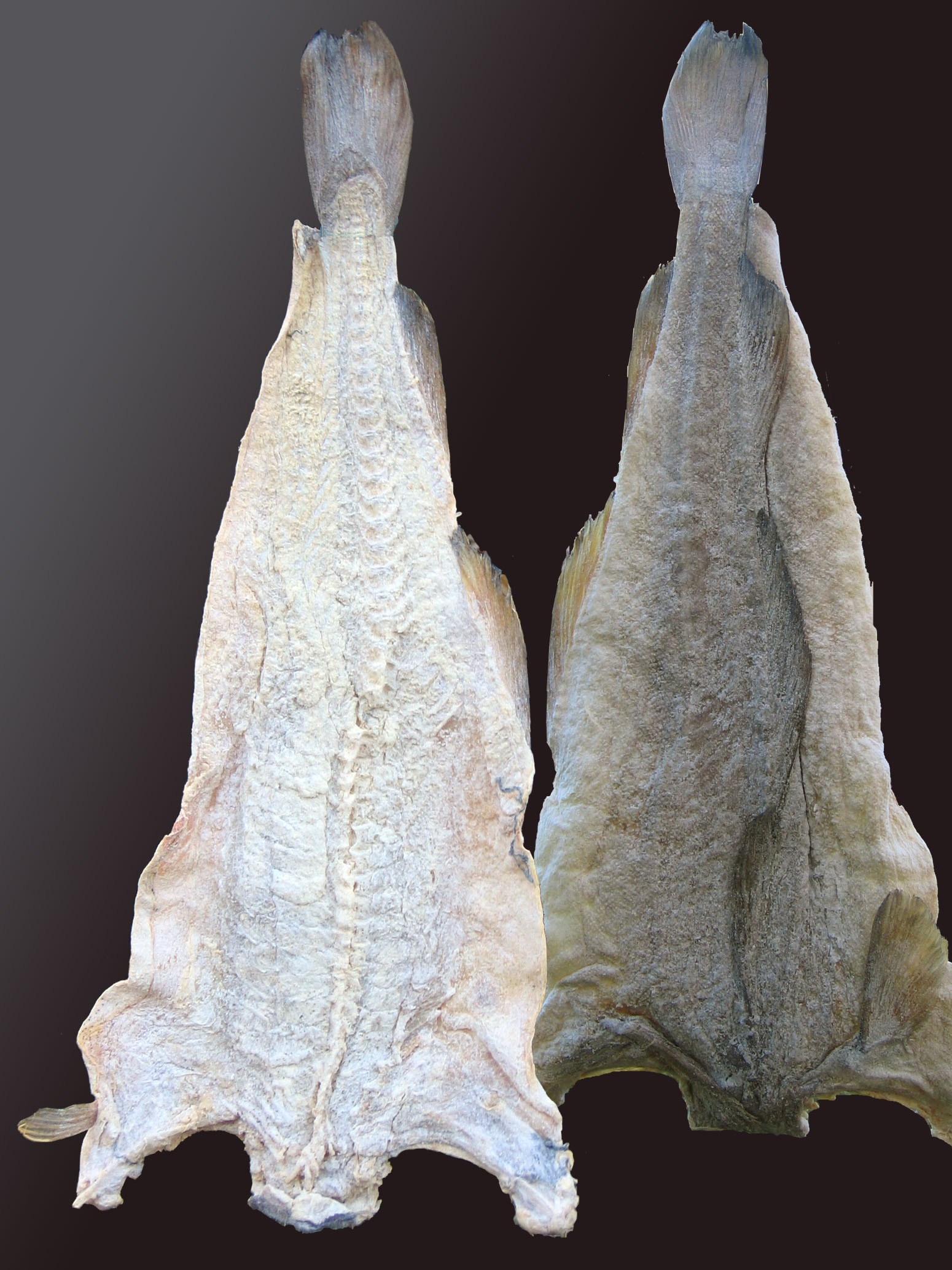
Salted and dried cod, produced in Norway

Bacalhau (Portuguese: [bɐkɐˈʎaw]) is the Portuguese word for cod and—in a culinary context—dried and salted cod. Fresh (unsalted) cod is referred to as bacalhau fresco (fresh cod).

== Portuguese and other cuisines ==
Bacalhau dishes are common in Portugal, and also in former Portuguese colonies such as Cape Verde, Guinea-Bissau, Angola, Macau, Brazil, Timor-Leste and Goa. There are said to be over 1000 recipes for salt cod in Portugal alone and it can be considered the iconic ingredient of Portuguese cuisine (it is one of the few species of fish not consumed fresh in this fish-loving country, which boasts the highest per capita fish consumption within the European Union). It is often cooked on social occasions and is the traditional Christmas Eve dinner in some parts of Portugal.

== Cuisine ==
There are numerous bacalhau recipe variations, depending on region and tradition. In Portugal, it is said there are more than 365 ways to cook bacalhau, one for every day of the year; others say there are 1,001 ways. Whatever the exact number, bacalhau is a ubiquitous ingredient in Portuguese cuisine.

Bacalhau is often served with potatoes, sweet potatoes, yams and fresh bread. More traditional flavourings include but are not limited to garlic, onion, olive oil, black pepper, white pepper, piripiri, bay leaves, parsley, coriander and allspice. Green wine (vinho verde) or mature wines (Alentejo wine, Dão wine, or Douro wine) are served alongside.

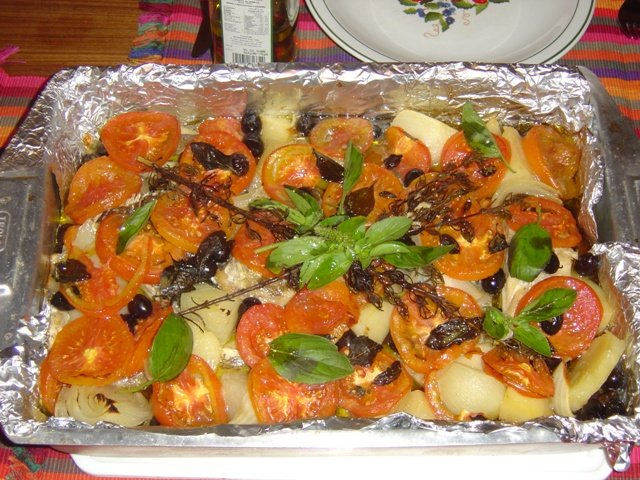
Traditional bacalhau dish

Some bacalhau dishes:

- Arroz de Bacalhau
- Açorda de Bacalhau
- Bacalhau à Gomes de Sá (some varieties: original, Porto)
- Bacalhau à Brás
- Bacalhau Assado
- Bacalhau à Zé do Pipo
- Bacalhau à Lagareiro
- Bacalhau com Broa
- Bacalhau com Castanhas
- Bacalhau com natas (bacalhau with cream)
- Bacalhau com todos
- Bacalhau Confitado em azeite
- Bacalhau Espiritual
- Bacalhau no Forno com Cebolada
- Bacalhau Suado à Lisboa
- Pasteis de Bacalhau/Bolinhos de Bacalhau
- Pataniscas de Bacalhau

== Protection in the EU and UK ==
The traditional production method for Bacalhau is protected in the EU and UK as a traditional speciality guaranteed under the name Bacalhau de Cura Tradicional Portuguesa.

== History ==
Salt cod has been produced for at least 500 years, since the time of the European discoveries of the New World. Before refrigeration, there was a need to preserve the cod; drying and salting are ancient techniques to preserve nutrients and the process changes the fish's taste. More importantly, fish low in oils and fats are more suitable for the drying and preservation process, as oils and fats prevent the salt from preserving the fish. Cod have very low levels of oils and fats in their muscle tissue, and most is located in the liver.

Portuguese, Norman, Breton, and English fisherman were the first to adopt the salt-based curing technique from Basque fishermen in Newfoundland near the cod-rich Grand Banks by the late 1500s. By the 1700s, salted cod had become a staple food for ordinary Portuguese people and by upper levels of Portuguese society. With the advancements in freezing and transportation in the 1900s, salted cod from North America declined and Iceland and Norway became the major supplier of the salted fish to Portuguese markets. During this time bacalhau was a cheap source of protein and frequently consumed. Thus, bacalhau became a staple of the Portuguese cuisine, nicknamed fiel amigo ('loyal friend'). In fact, in Portugal, cod always refers to salted, dried codfish and it is very rare to find fresh cod (bacalhau fresco) for sale.

This dish is also popular in Portugal and other Roman Catholic countries because of historical fasting rules, which forbade the eating of meat on many days (Fridays, Lent, and other festivals), and so bacalhau dishes were eaten instead. Bacalhau is also popular in Sfax where this dish is eaten with chermoula on the first day of Eid ul-Fitr .

In Portugal, bacalhau is often sold as a generic product with no brand information. Customers are free to touch, smell, and otherwise personally inspect the fish, which is very different from how fresh seafood is often sold. Stores can carry a large variety of bacalhau differing in color, size, smell, taste, and dryness. Such variation has led Portugal to define requirements as to what products can carry the label Bacalhau de Cura Tradicional Portuguesa. They are however, graded by weight which often defines what price category the bacalhau is sold under. The largest is Especial, which are large pieces of whole fish weighing more than 4 kg. Following this are Graúdo (4–2 kg), Crescido (2–1 kg), Corrente (1–0.5 kg) and Miúdo (below 500g).

== See also ==
- Dried and salted cod
- Fishing in Portugal
- List of dried foods
- Portuguese cuisine
