= Dorcas Reilly =

American chef and inventor (1926–2018)

- Born: Dorcas Lillian Bates; July 22, 1926; Woodbury, New Jersey, U.S.
- Died: October 15, 2018 (aged 92); Camden, New Jersey, U.S.
- Education: Drexel University
- Occupations: Chef; Inventor
- Spouse: Thomas H. Reilly

Dorcas Lillian Bates Reilly (July 22, 1926 – October 15, 2018) was an American chef, homemaker, and inventor. Reilly worked for several years in Campbell's Test Kitchen creating new recipes. She is best known for inventing the green bean casserole recipe. Reilly was called the "Grandmother of the Green Bean Bake."

== Biography ==
Reilly was born Dorcas Lillian Bates in Woodbury, New Jersey on July 22, 1926. She grew up in Glassboro and later in Camden. Reilly attended Camden High School, along with her future husband, Thomas H. Reilly. Dorcas Reilly went on to attend Drexel University, where she was a member of Alpha Sigma Alpha and earned a degree in home economics in 1947. She was one of the first members of her family to go to college.

Reilly started working at the Campbell's Test Kitchen in 1949. She was one of the first full time employees in the department. Reilly went on to become the supervisor in the home economics department. She also worked as a recipe developer. During her time at the test kitchen, she created hundreds of different recipes, including Campbell's tomato soup meatloaf, a tuna-noodle casserole, types of porcupine meatballs, and the Sloppy Joe "souperburger." She is best known for her creation of the green bean casserole.

In 1959, she married Thomas H. Reilly. Dorcas Reilly left the Campbell's Test Kitchen briefly to raise her children in 1961. She returned later to work as the manager of the Test Kitchen. During her time back at Campell's she was cited by the Courier-Post as an expert in "cooking and entertaining." Reilly retired in 1988. In 2002, Reilly and Campbell's donated her recipe for green bean casserole to the National Inventors Hall of Fame.

She was a member of the Order of the Eastern Star and the Daughters of the American Revolution.

Reilly died on October 15, 2018, in Camden, New Jersey from Alzheimer's disease.
