= Hotdish =

Casserole from the American Upper Midwest

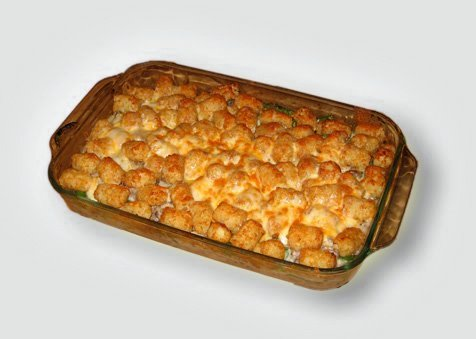
- Tater tot hotdish
- Course: Main or side dish
- Place of origin: United States
- Region or state: Upper Midwest
- Main ingredients: Starch (potatoes, pasta, etc.), cream soup (typically cream of mushroom), meat, vegetables

A hotdish (or hot dish) is a casserole that typically contains a starch, a meat, and a canned or frozen vegetable mixed with canned soup. The dish originates in the Upper Midwest region of the United States, where it remains a popular comfort food, particularly in Minnesota, South Dakota, Wisconsin, North Dakota, and Montana. Hotdish is cooked in a single baking dish, and served hot (per its name). It commonly appears at communal gatherings such as family reunions, potlucks, and church suppers.

A classic hotdish known as "tater tot hotdish" is traditionally made with ground beef topped with tater tots and flavored with thick condensed cream of mushroom soup sauce.

== History ==
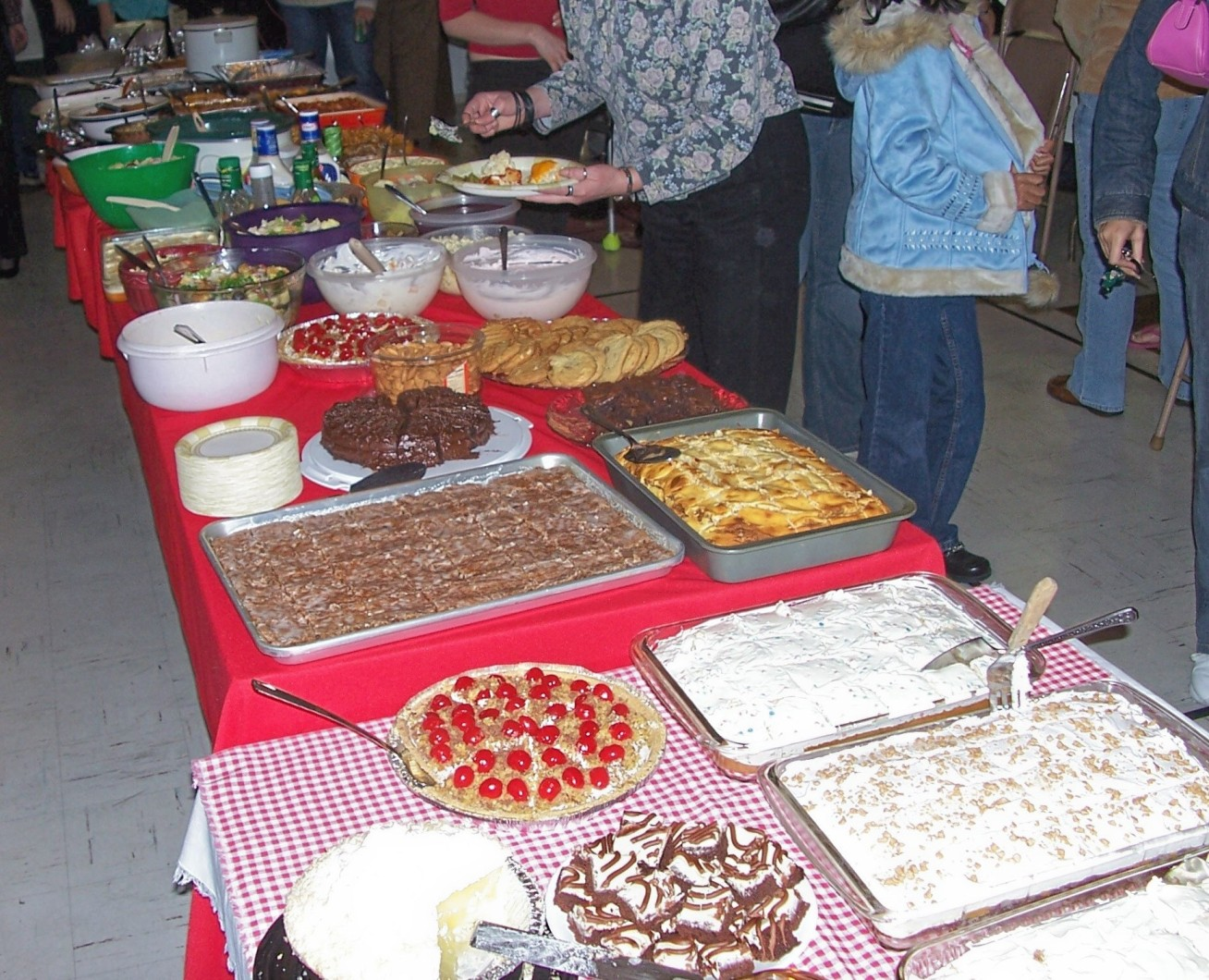
A typical covered dish dinner or potluck with desserts and bars at one end, salads, and hot dishes at the other end

The history of the hotdish goes back to when "budget-minded farm wives needed to feed their own families, as well as congregations in the basements of the first Minnesota churches."

Hotdish secured its popularity during the Great Depression, when grocery budgets required creative preparations for cheap foods, and the popularity continued into the rationing during World War II. It was likely preceded by an American dish known as "hot pot."

According to Howard Mohr, author of How to Talk Minnesotan, "A traditional main course, hotdish is cooked and served hot in a single baking dish and commonly appears at family reunions and church suppers." The most typical meat for many years has been ground beef, and cream of mushroom remains the favorite canned soup. In years past, a pasta was the most frequently used starch, but tater tots and local wild rice have become very popular as well.

In 2016, Food & Wine credited a 1930 Mankato church congregation as the first written record of a hotdish recipe. The source included neither the name of the woman that invented the recipe nor the source. Mankato resident, Joyce Nelson, 90, had a copy of the 1930 Lutheran church recipe book and it was found that the recipe was indeed included in that year's cookbook. Mrs. C. W. Anderson had submitted the recipe for a HOT DISH made with hamburger, onions, Creamette pasta, celery, a can of peas, tomato soup and tomatoes.

Hotdishes are filling, convenient, and easy to make. They are well-suited for family reunions, funerals, church suppers, and covered dish dinners or potlucks where they may be paired with potato salad, coleslaw, Jello salads, Snickers salad, and pan-baked desserts known as bars.

== Ingredients ==
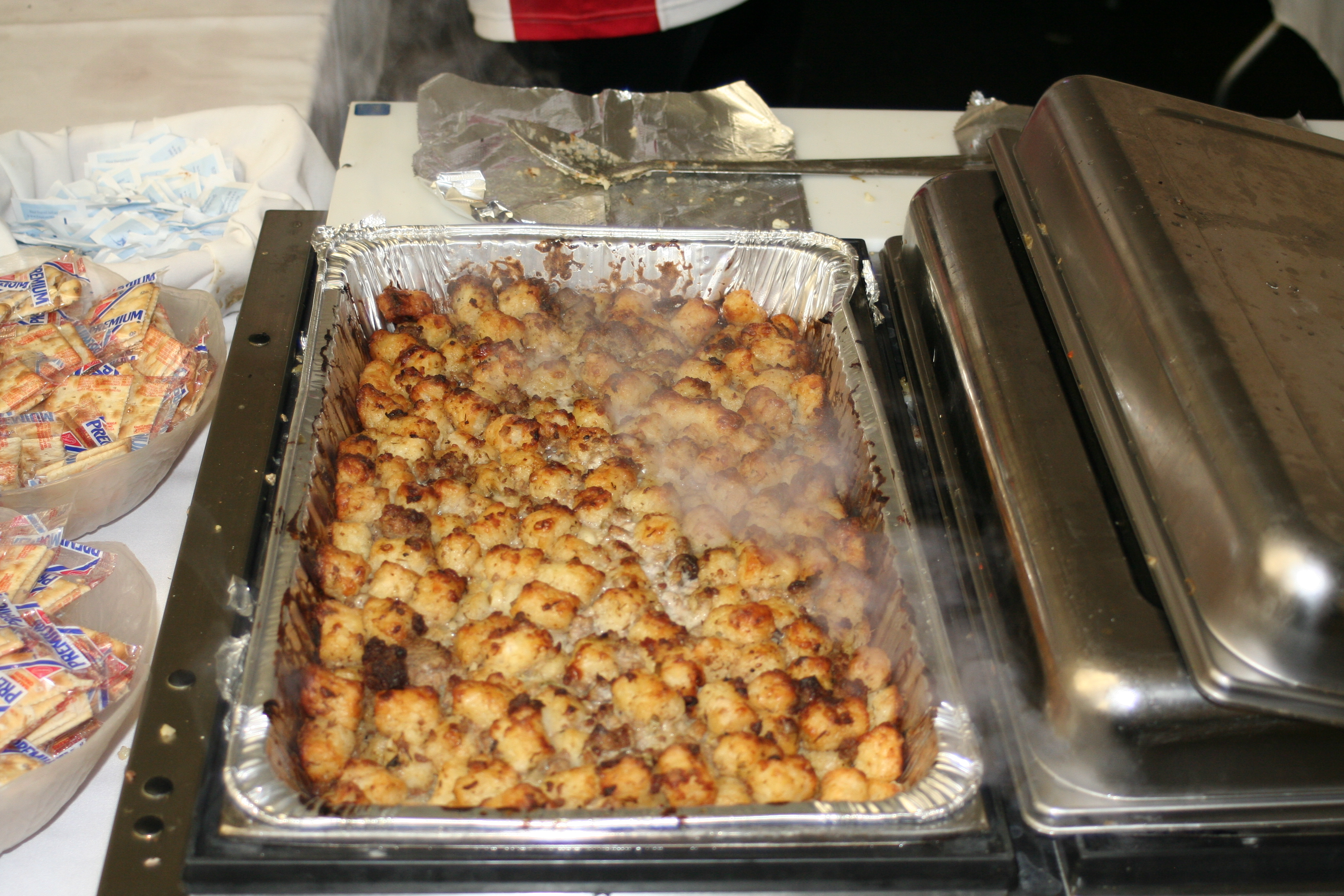
Tater tot hotdish from the Saint Paul, Minnesota Winter Carnival

Typical ingredients in hotdish are potatoes or pasta, ground beef, green beans, and corn, with canned soup added as a binder, flavoring, and sauce. Potatoes may be in the form of tater tots, hash browns, potato chips, or shoe string potatoes. The dish is usually seasoned lightly with salt and pepper, and it may be eaten with ketchup as a condiment. Another popular hotdish is the tuna hotdish, made with macaroni or egg noodles, canned tuna, peas, and mushroom soup. Also common is a dish known as goulash, though it bears no resemblance to the familiar Hungarian goulash. Minnesota goulash is usually made with ground beef, macaroni, canned tomatoes, and perhaps a can of creamed corn.

Cream of mushroom soup is so ubiquitous in hotdish that it is often referred to in such recipes as “Lutheran Binder,” referring to hotdish's position as a staple of Lutheran church cookbooks. The soup is considered a defining ingredient by some commentators.

== Minnesota congressional hot dish competition ==
After the 2010 U.S. midterm elections, then Senator Al Franken invited the members of the Minnesota congressional delegation to a friendly hotdish-making competition, to come together in celebration of the state before the beginning of the legislative session. Six out of 10 delegation members—Sens. Franken and Amy Klobuchar and Representatives Michele Bachmann, Tim Walz, Keith Ellison and Betty McCollum—participated, with Klobuchar taking first place with her "Taconite Tater Tot Hotdish" and Walz taking second with his "Chicken Mushroom Wild Rice Hotdish". The competition became an annual event entitled the Minnesota Congressional Hotdish Off with the slogan "Working together to improve the lives of Minnesotans, one hotdish at a time."

For the second competition in March 2012, Franken's "Mom's Mahnomen Madness Hotdish" tied with Chip Cravaack's "Minnesota Wild Strata Hotdish" for first place.

With 9 of the 10 members of the delegation participating in 2013, the winner was Congressman Walz's "Hermann the German Hotdish", which featured a bottle of August Schell beer, made locally in New Ulm, Minnesota. Sen. Franken has also provided a free PDF version of the 2013 Hotdish Off collection of recipes.

In 2014, all ten members participated, with Rep. Walz's "Turkey Trot Tater Tot Hotdish" winning. In 2015, again all ten participated, and Rep. McCollum's "Turkey, Sweet Potato, and Wild Rice" dish won.

=== Past winners ===
- 2011 Sen. Amy Klobuchar's Taconite Tater Tot Hot Dish
- 2012 Sen. Al Franken's Mom's Mahnomen Madness Hotdish and Rep. Chip Cravaack's Minnesota Wild Strata Hotdish (tie)
- 2013 Rep. Tim Walz's Hermann the German Hotdish
- 2014 Rep. Tim Walz's Turkey Trot Tater-Tot Hotdish
- 2015 Rep. Betty McCollum’s Turkey, Sweet Potato, and Wild Rice Hotdish
- 2016 Rep. Tim Walz’s Turkey Taco Tot Hotdish
- 2017 Rep. Collin Peterson’s Right to Bear Arms Hotdish
- 2018 Rep. Tom Emmer's Hotdish of Champions
- 2019 Rep. Betty McCollum's Hotdish A-Hmong Friends

== In popular culture ==
Hotdish frequently appeared, along with other stereotypical Minnesotan dishes such as lutefisk, in the radio program A Prairie Home Companion. Hotdish is also described in Howard Mohr’s book How to Talk Minnesotan. Hotdish is an integral element of the book Hotdish to Die For, a collection of six culinary mystery short stories in which the weapon of choice is hotdish.

Minnesota public television station KSMQ in Austin, Minnesota has produced a 2012 documentary video entitled "Minnesota Hotdish." providing a historical and humorous look at the popular church supper and family gathering staple.

Hotdish was the main meal featured in the comedy-drama film Manny & Lo.

"Hot Dish" is the name of an Anchorage-based bluegrass band. Their band name was chosen as a nod to the Midwestern roots of three of the five band members.

"Hot Dish" is the seventh track on Lizzobangers, the debut studio album of singer Lizzo. Lizzo lived in the Twin Cities at the time and started her career in the area.

Minnesota Governor Tim Walz went viral on X after posting his winning "Turkey Trot Tater-Tot Hotdish" recipe.

Food blogger and restaurateur Molly Yeh is notable for sharing many hotdish recipes and was labeled in one article a “hotdish expert”.

== See also ==
- Cassoulet
- Casserole
- Tuna casserole
- Green bean casserole
- List of casserole dishes
- Funeral potatoes
- Rappie pie
- Timballo
- Comfort food
- Cuisine of the Midwestern United States
- Kugel
- Lancashire hotpot
- Tater tots - grated potato formed into small cylinders and deep-fried
