= Tuna casserole =

American casserole dish

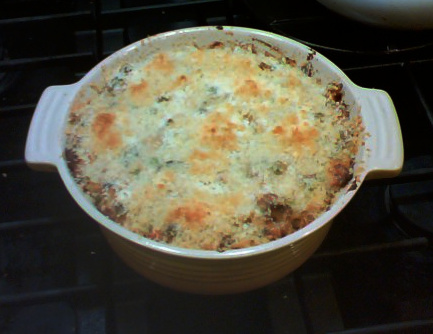
- American tuna casserole
- Place of origin: unknown
- Main ingredients: Egg noodles, tuna
- Variations: Peas

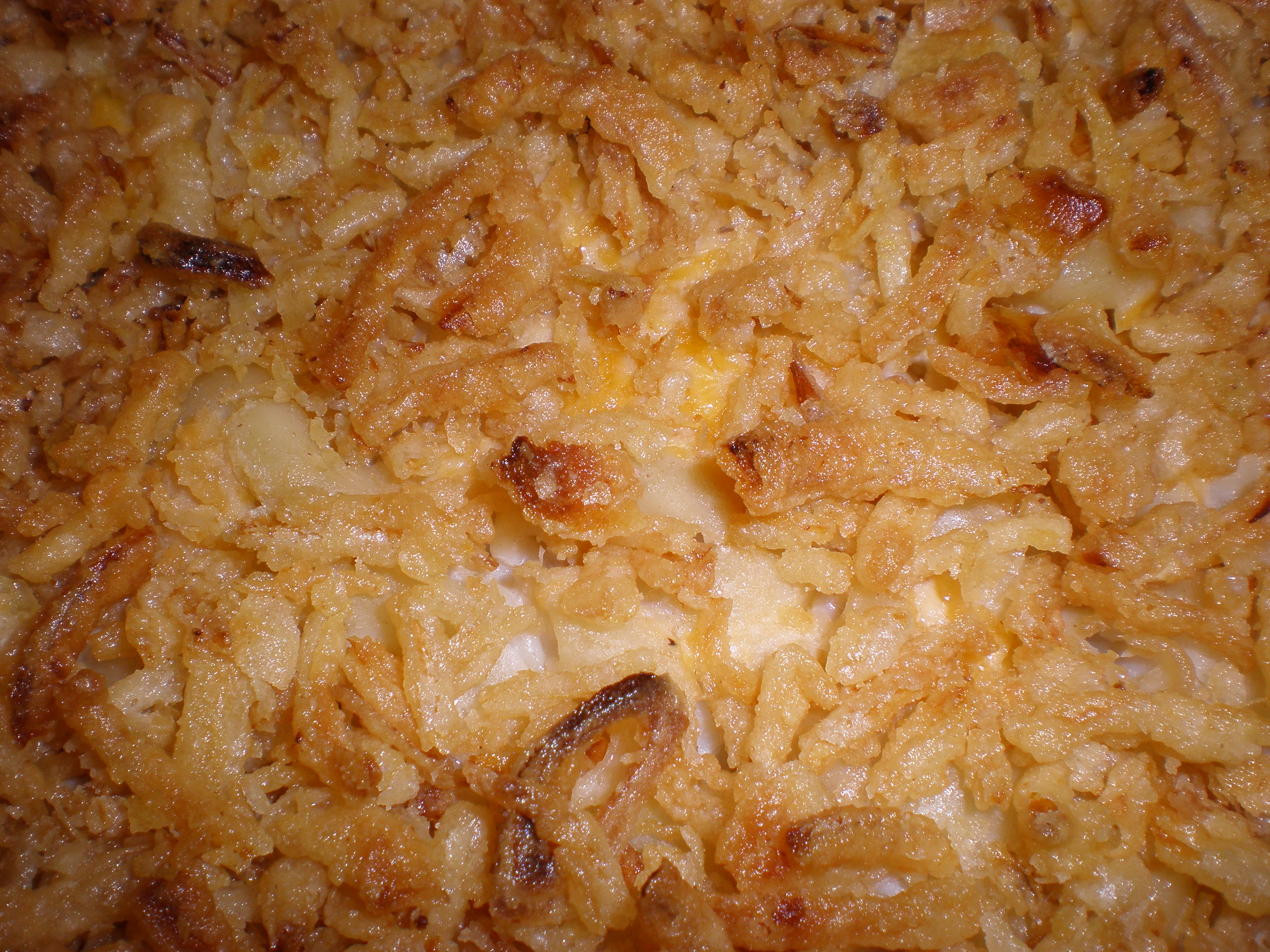
Tuna casserole closeup

Tuna casserole or tuna mornay is a casserole primarily made with pasta or rice and canned tuna. It is eaten in North America, Italy, Australia, Japan and Finland, and presumably elsewhere.

== In North America ==
In North America, egg noodles are a popular choice for the pasta. It is often made with cream of mushroom soup. Peas are sometimes added, and the dish may be topped with something crunchy, such as breadcrumbs, fried onion, potato chips or corn flakes.

Casseroles became popular in American households in the 1950s mainly because the ingredients were cheap and easy to find at the supermarket. In 1952, Campbell's published a book of recipes using canned soup which included a recipe for tuna casserole. Tuna casserole became popular to take to potlucks, especially in the Midwest, or taken to the home of someone who was sick or going through bereavement so that they would not need to cook.

== In Finland ==
In Finland the dish is called tonnikalavuoka or tonnikalapastavuoka "tuna pasta casserole". The primary ingredients are tuna and pasta, often with tomatoes and garlic included and shredded mozzarella sprinkled on top.

Tuna casserole is one of the most popular school meals in Finland.

== In Australia ==
In Australia the dish is called tuna mornay. It is called this because Mornay sauce (a type of Bechamel with grated cheese) is used as a topping. Regional variants can contain additional ingredients such as frozen peas, corn or pineapple.

== Modern adaptations ==
Some modern recipes replace white pasta or rice with whole grain or legume-based alternatives, such as whole-wheat or chickpea pasta. Lower-fat dairy products—such as skim milk, Greek yogurt, and reduced-fat cheese—are also used.

Additional vegetables, such as spinach, mushrooms, broccoli, green peas, or carrots, are commonly added. In plant-based versions, dairy ingredients may be substituted with non-dairy milk, nutritional yeast, or cashew-based sauces. Some adaptations also include legumes or eggs alongside tuna.

== See also ==
- Hotdish
- Comfort food
- Funeral potatoes
- Green bean casserole
- List of tuna dishes
- Midwestern cuisine
- Australian cuisine
- Timballo
