= Green bean =

Unripe, young fruit of cultivars of the bean

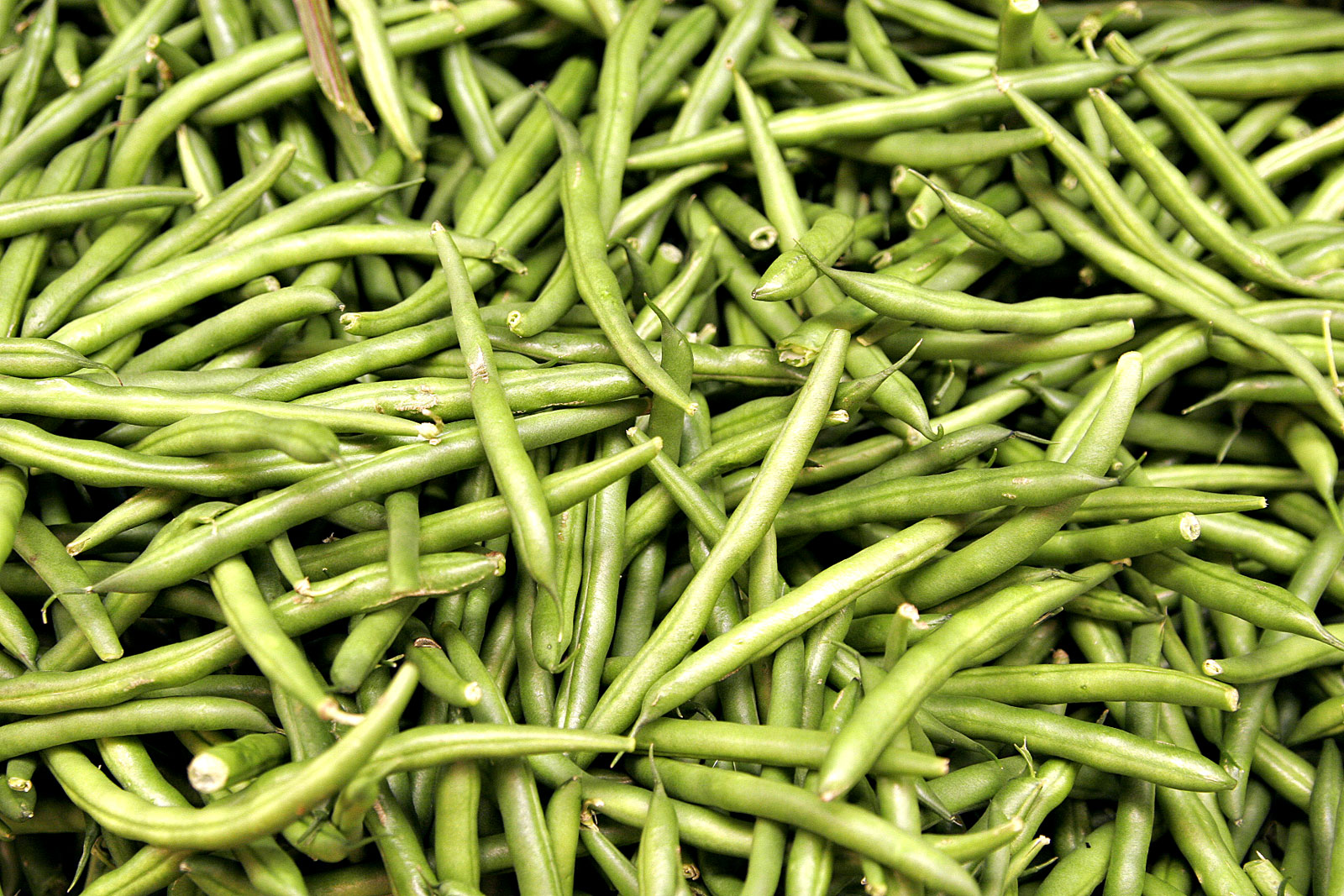
A pile of raw green beans

Green beans are young, unripe fruits of various cultivars of the common bean (Phaseolus vulgaris). Green beans are known by several common names, including French beans, string beans (although most modern varieties are "stringless"), and snap beans or simply "snaps".

Immature or young pods of the runner bean (P. coccineus), yardlong bean (Vigna unguiculata subsp. sesquipedalis), and hyacinth bean (Lablab purpureus) are used in a similar way. Green beans are distinguished from the many other bean varieties in that they are harvested and consumed with their enclosing pods before the bean seeds inside have fully matured. An analogous practice is the harvest and consumption of unripened pea pods, as is done with snow peas or sugar snap peas.

== Uses ==
As common food in many countries, green beans are sold fresh, canned, and frozen. They can be eaten steamed, boiled, stir-fried, or baked. They are commonly cooked in other dishes, such as soups, stews, and casseroles. Green beans can be pickled, similarly to cucumbers.

Some German sources advise that green beans should not be eaten raw as they contain phytohaemagglutinin, a lectin toxic to humans that is destroyed by high temperatures. Symptoms of poisoning typically appear two to three hours after consumption and can include abdominal pain, nausea, bloody diarrhea, fever and low blood pressure. However, Americans eat raw green beans, and American sources do not consider them to be dangerous.

A dish with green beans common throughout the northern US, particularly at Thanksgiving, is green bean casserole, a dish of green beans, cream of mushroom soup, and French-fried onions.

== Nutrition ==
Raw green beans
Nutritional value per 100 g (3.5 oz)
- Energy: 131 kJ (31 kcal)
- Carbohydrates: 6.97 g
- Dietary fiber: 2.7 g
- Fat: 0.22 g
- Protein: 1.83 g
Vitamins and minerals
Vitamins	Quantity %DV^{†}
Vitamin A equiv.	4% 35 μg
Thiamine (B1)	7% 0.082 mg
Riboflavin (B2)	8% 0.104 mg
Niacin (B3)	5% 0.734 mg
Pantothenic acid (B5)	5% 0.225 mg
Vitamin B6	8% 0.141 mg
Folate (B9)	8% 33 μg
Vitamin C	14% 12.2 mg
Vitamin K	12% 14.4 μg
Minerals	Quantity %DV^{†}
Calcium	3% 37 mg
Iron	6% 1.03 mg
Magnesium	6% 25 mg
Manganese	9% 0.215 mg
Phosphorus	3% 38 mg
Potassium	7% 211 mg
Zinc	2% 0.24 mg
- Other constituents: Quantity
- Water: 90 g
- Link to USDA Database entry
- ^{†}Percentages estimated using US recommendations for adults, except for potassium, which is estimated based on expert recommendation from the National Academies.

Raw green beans are 90% water, 7% carbohydrates, 2% protein, and contain negligible fat. In a 100-gram (3 1/2-ounce) reference amount, raw green beans supply 131 kilojoules (31 kilocalories) of food energy and are a moderate source (range 10–19% of the Daily Value) of vitamin C and vitamin K, with no other micronutrients in significant content.

== Domestication ==
The green bean (Phaseolus vulgaris) originated in Central and South America, where there is evidence that it has been cultivated in Mexico and Peru for thousands of years.

== Characteristics ==
The first "stringless" bean was bred in 1894 by Calvin Keeney, called the "father of the stringless bean," while working in Le Roy, New York. Most modern green bean varieties do not have strings.

=== Plant ===
Green beans are classified by growth habit into two major groups, "bush" (or "dwarf") beans and "pole" (or "climbing") beans.

Bush beans are short plants, growing to not more than 2 feet (61 cm) in height, often without requiring supports. They generally reach maturity and produce all of their fruit in a relatively short period, then cease to produce. Owing to this concentrated production and ease of mechanized harvesting, bush-type beans are those most often grown on commercial farms. Bush green beans are usually cultivars of the common bean (Phaseolus vulgaris).

Pole beans have a climbing habit and produce a twisting vine, which must be supported by "poles," trellises, or other means. Pole beans may be common beans (Phaseolus vulgaris), runner beans (Phaseolus coccineus) or yardlong beans (Vigna unguiculata subsp. sesquipedalis).

Half-runner beans have both bush and pole characteristics, and are sometimes classified separately from bush and pole varieties. Their runners can be about one to three metres (3–10 feet) long.

=== Varieties ===
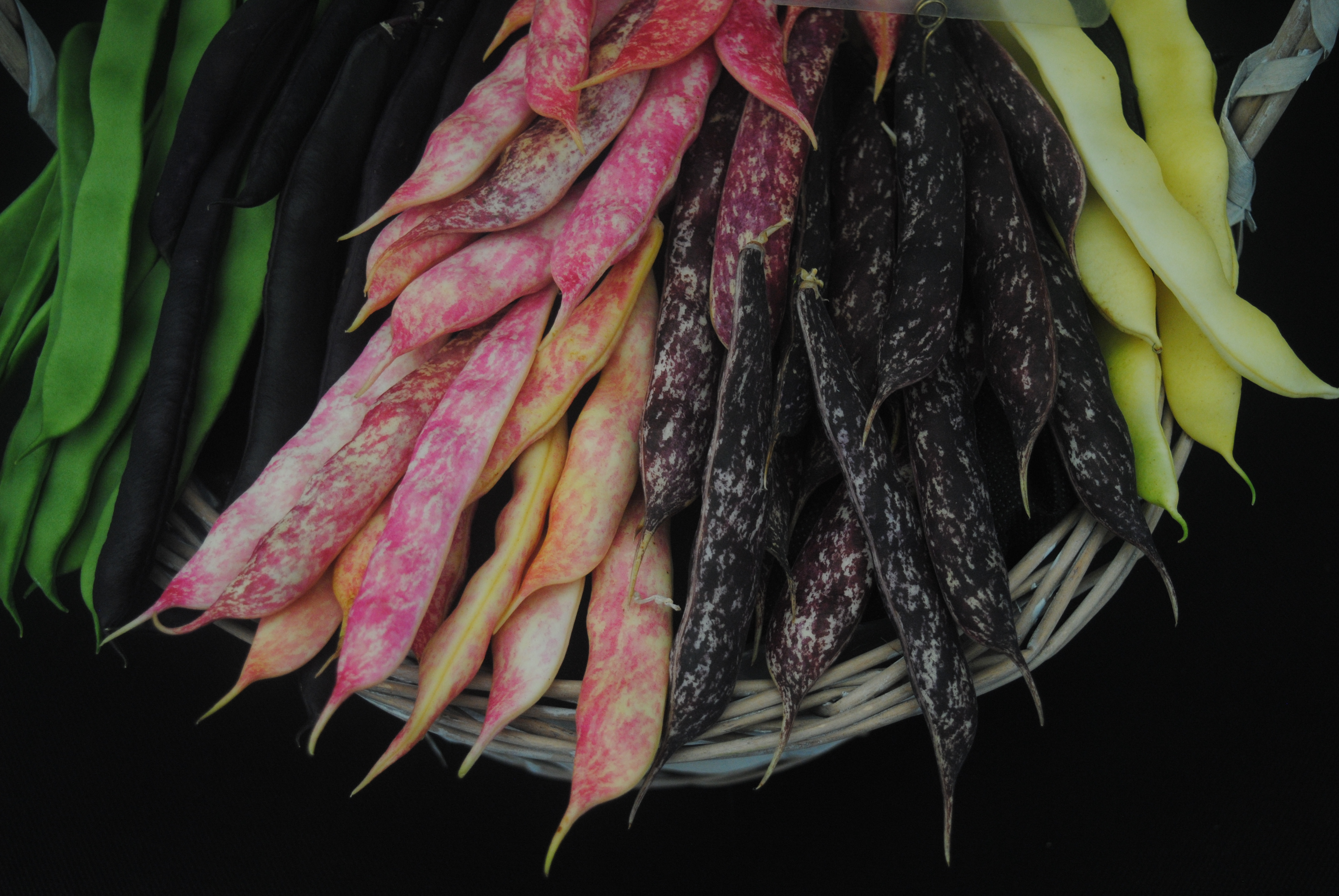
Varieties of climbing French beans, from left: 'The Hunter,' 'Cosse Violette,' 'Rob Roy,' 'Rob Splashed,' 'Kingston Gold'

Over 130 varieties (cultivars) of edible pod beans are known. Varieties specialized for use as green beans, selected for the succulence and flavor of their green pods, are the ones usually grown in the home vegetable garden, and many varieties exist. Beans with various pod colors (green, purple, red, or streaked.) are collectively known as snap beans, while green beans are exclusively green. Pod shapes range from thin and circular ("fillet" types) to wide and flat ("romano" types) and more common types in between.

The three most commonly known types of green beans belonging to the species Phaseolus vulgaris are string or snap beans, which may be round or have a flat pod; stringless or French beans, which lack a tough, fibrous string running along the length of the pod; and runner beans, which belong to a separate species, Phaseolus coccineus. Green beans may have a purple rather than green pod, which changes to green when cooked. Yellow-podded green beans are also known as wax beans. Wax bean cultivars are commonly of the bush or dwarf form.

All of the following varieties have green pods and are Phaseolus vulgaris unless otherwise specified:

==== Bush (dwarf) ====
- Blue Lake 274
- Contender
- Derby (1990 AAS winner)
- Golden Wax Improved (yellow/wax), 60 days
- Greencrop, 53 days
- Heavyweight II, 53 days
- Improved Tendergreen
- Provider
- Rocquencourt (yellow/wax), 50 days, heirloom
- Royal Burgundy (purple pod), 55 days
- Stringless Green Pod, heirloom
- Triomphe de Farcy, 48 days, heirloom

==== Pole (climbing) ====
- Algarve
- Blue Lake
- Golden Gate (yellow/wax)
- Gold Marie, 75 days, Common Mosaic virus (BCMV) resistant
- Kentucky Blue (AAS Winner)
- Kentucky Wonder, 65 days, heirloom
- Rattlesnake bean, 65 days, heirloom
- Scarlet Runner (Phaseolus coccineus)
- Trionfo Violetto (purple pod), 60 days
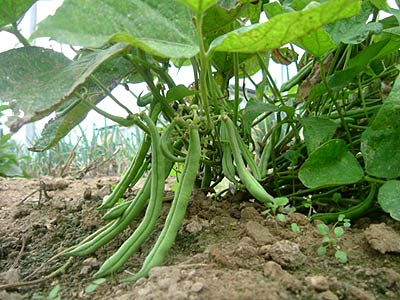
Green common beans on the plant

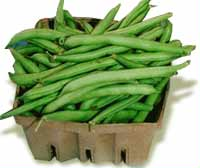
Whole raw green beans packed in a punnet for sale

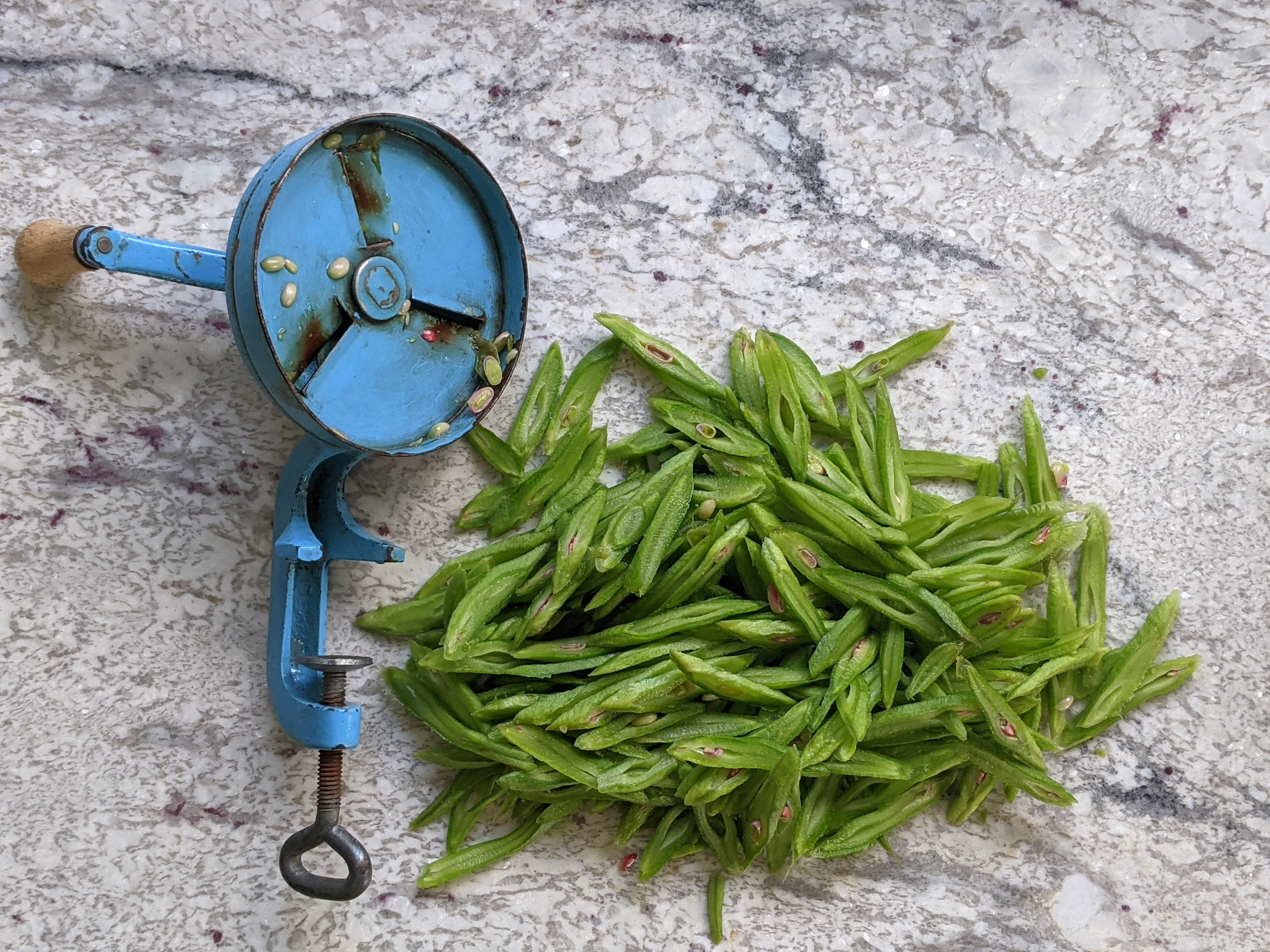
Green beans with bean slicer

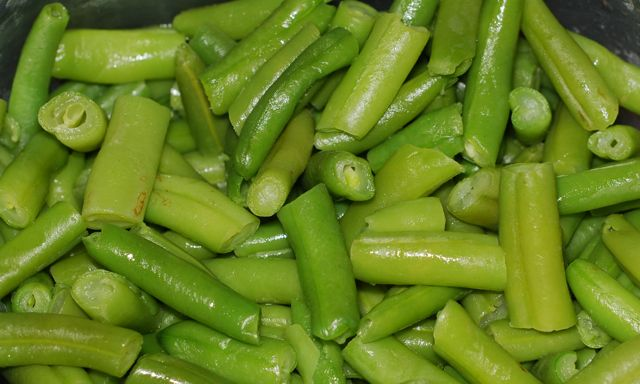
Cut and cooked green beans

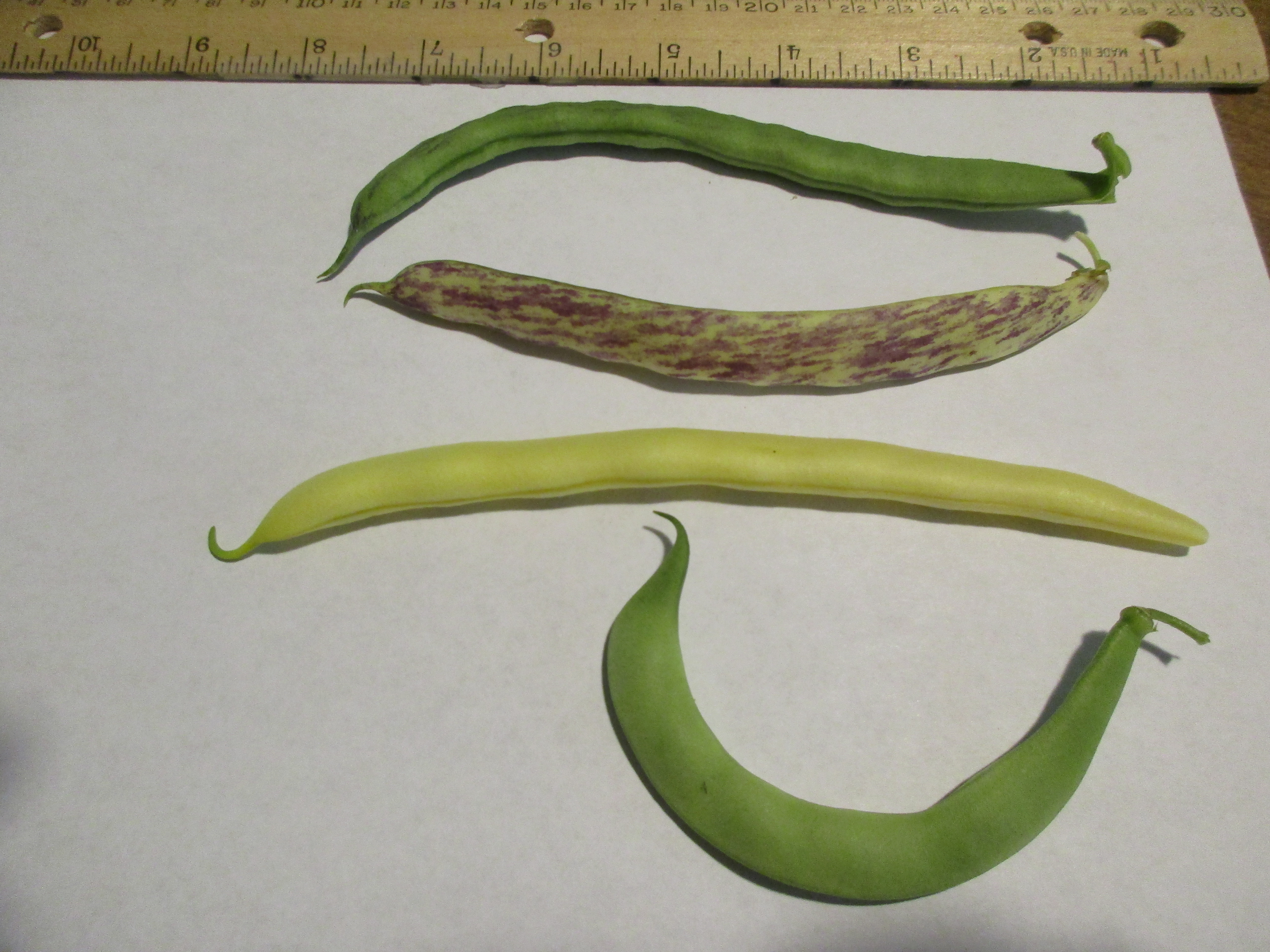
Four varieties of the common green bean

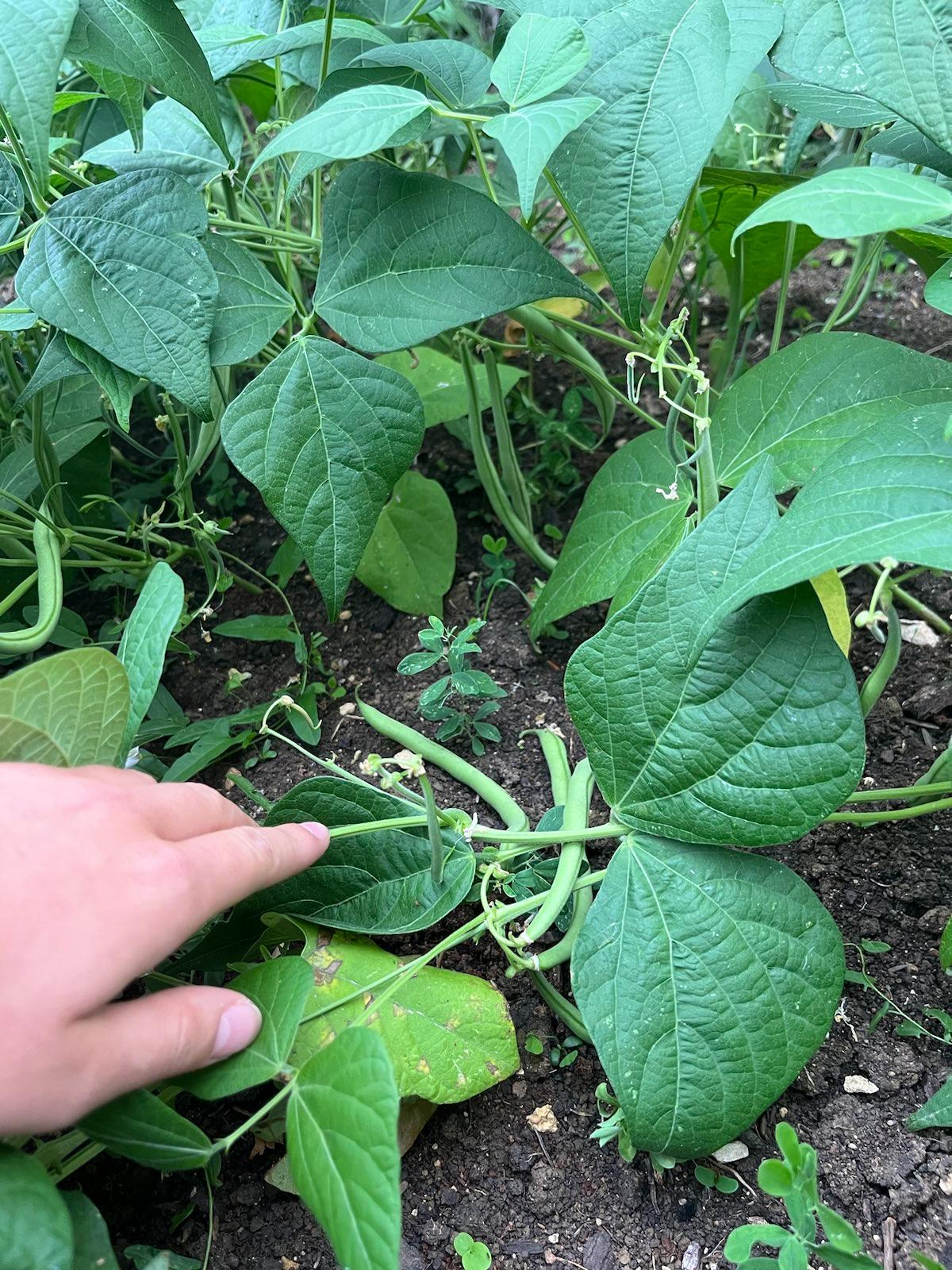
Green beans on a bush plant

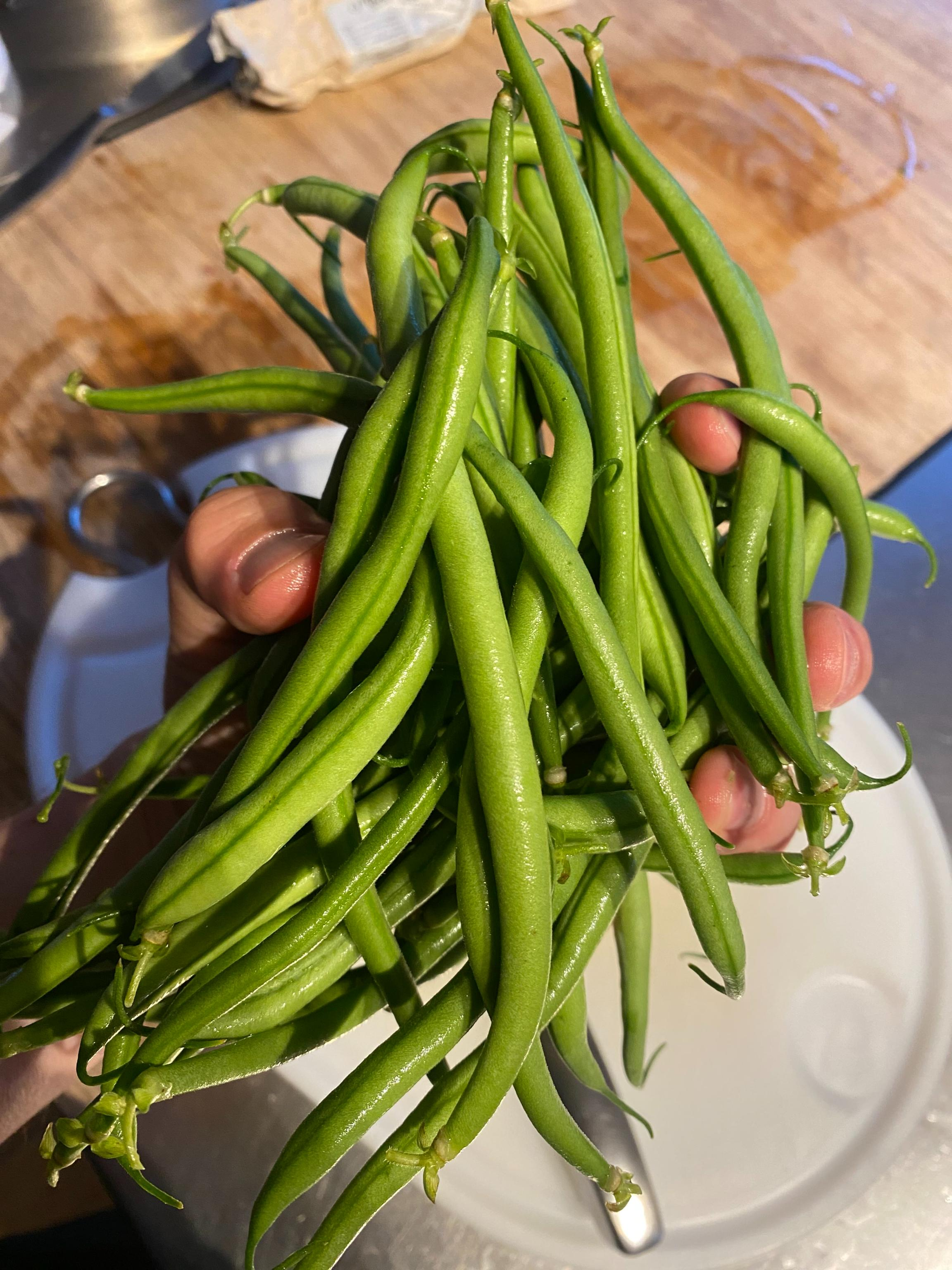
Mature green beans, freshly picked in France

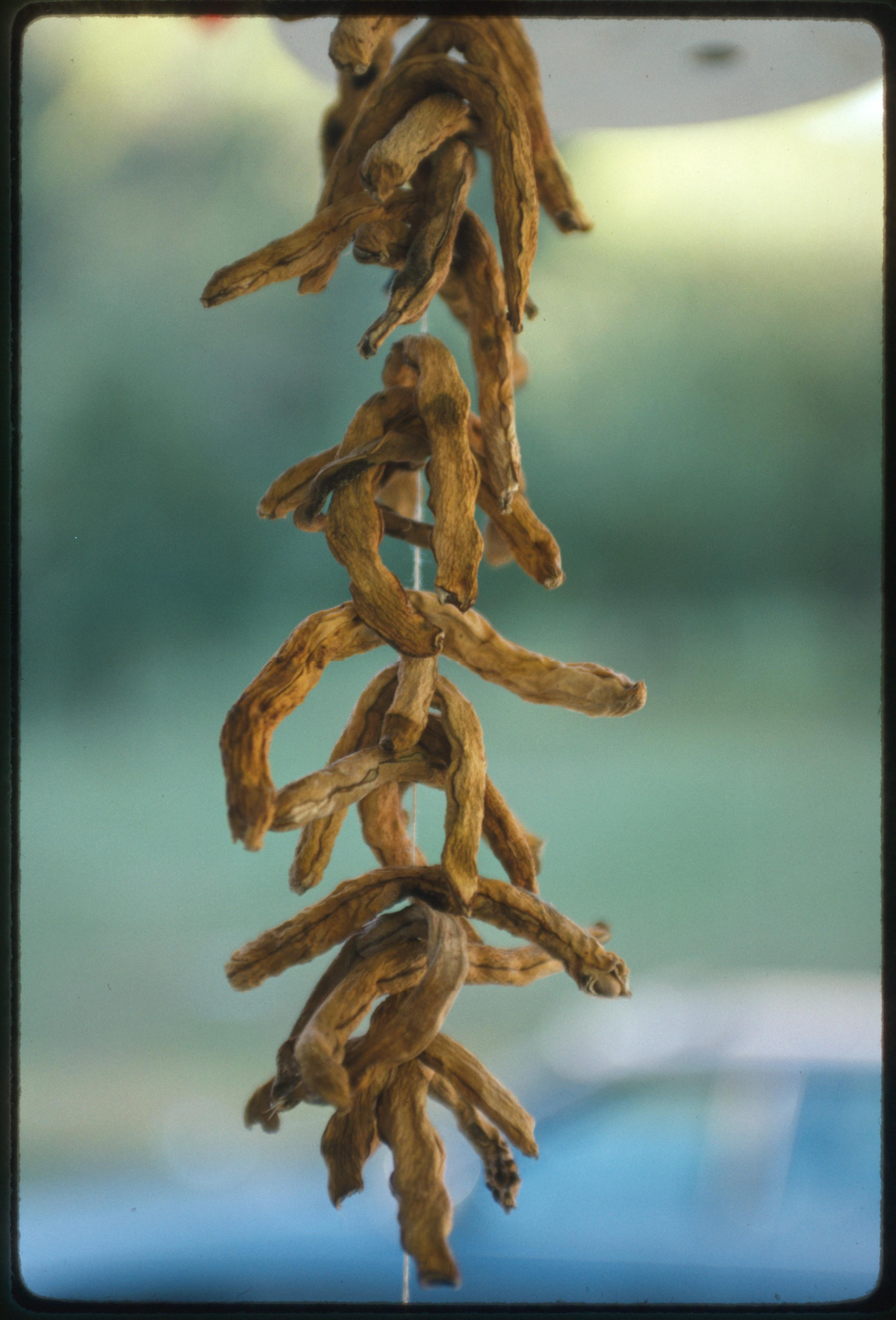
Dried green beans (known as leather britches or shucky beans)

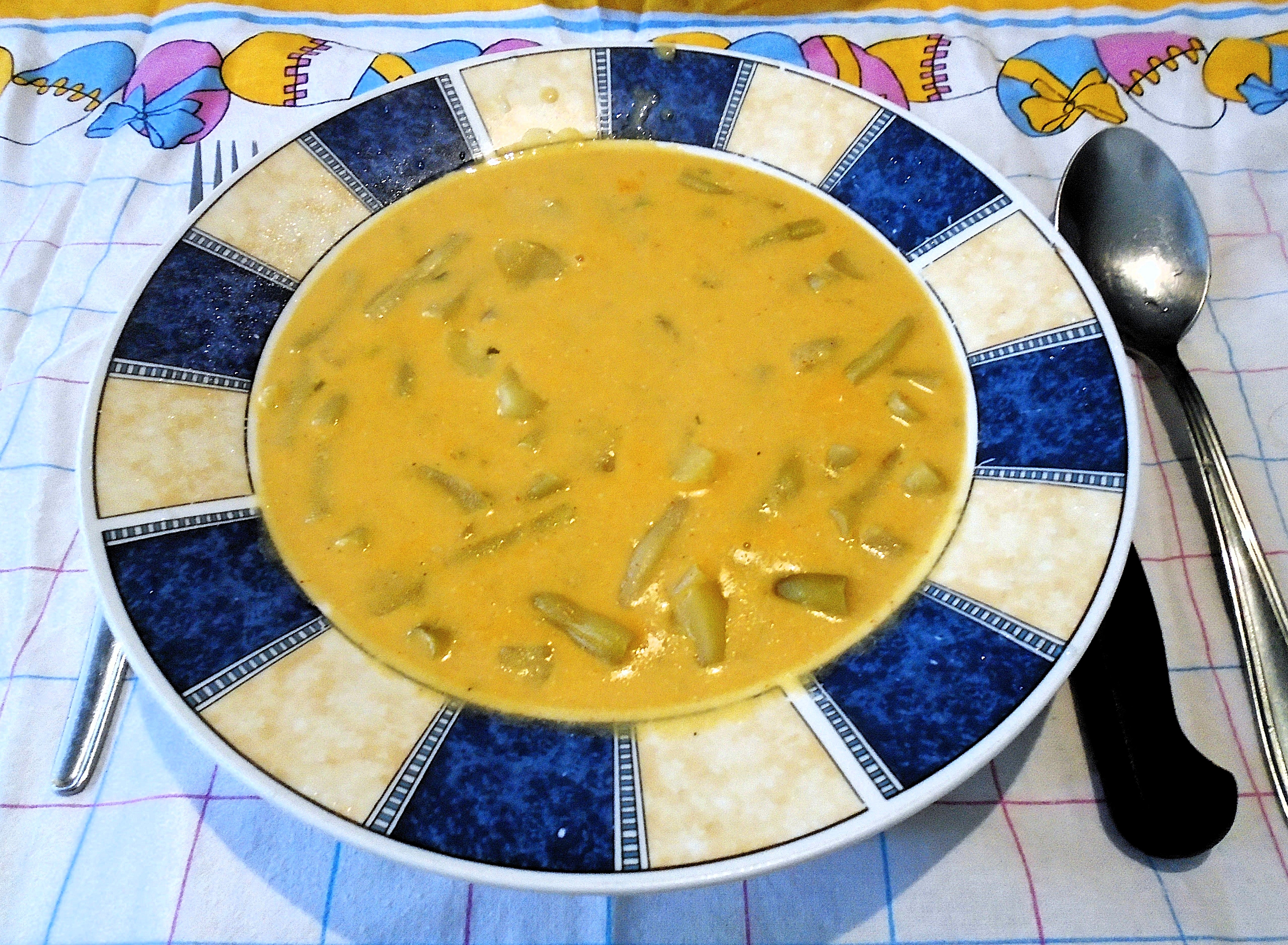
Green beans cream stew

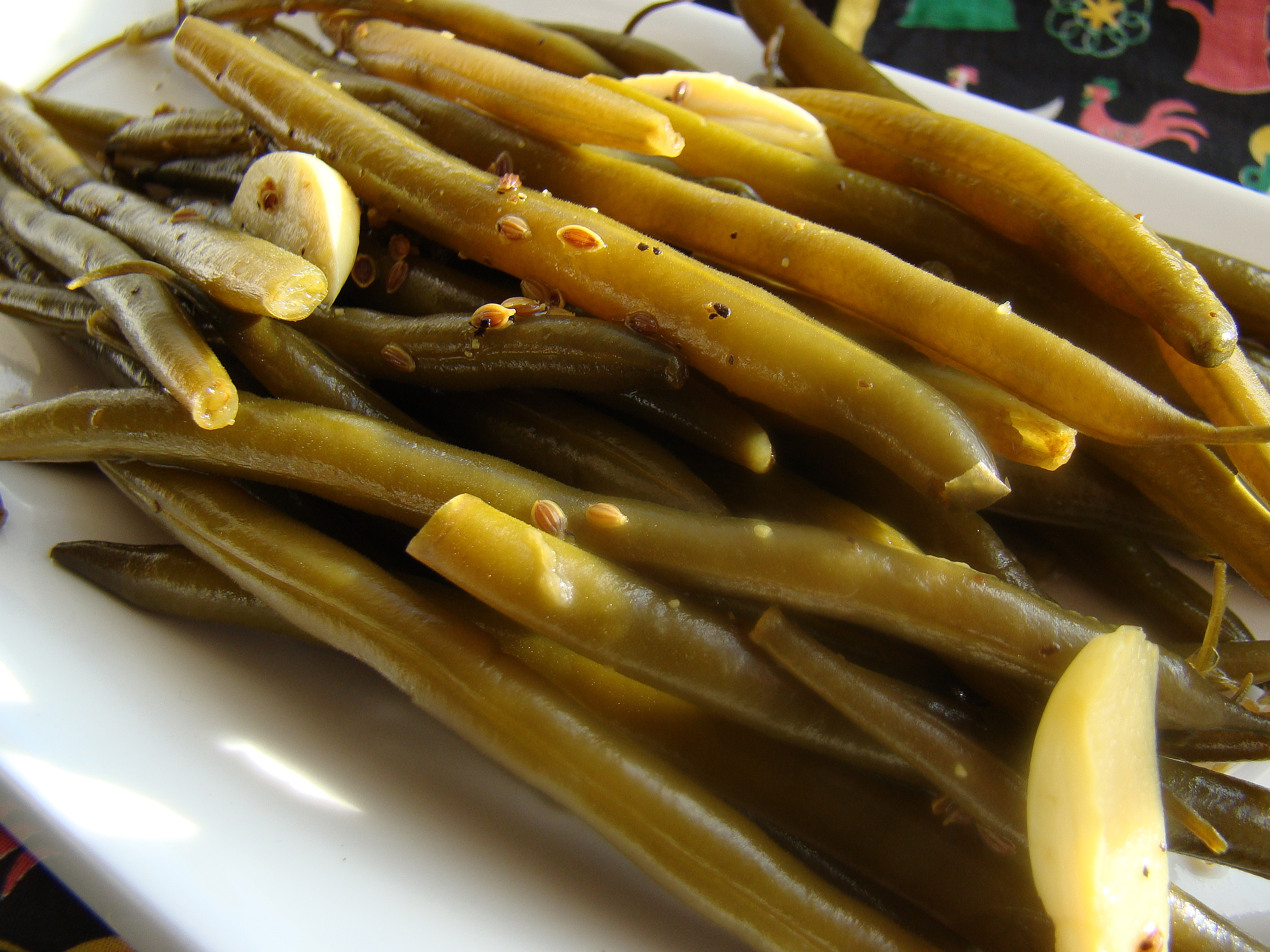
Pickled beans

== Production ==
Green beans 2024, millions of tonnes
China	18.6
India	2.9
Indonesia	0.9
Turkey	0.5
Morocco	0.2
World	25.9
Source: FAOSTAT of the United Nations

In 2024, world production of green beans was 26 million tonnes, with China accounting for 72% of the total, and India as the next largest producer (table).

Production of green beans

Green bean yield

Production of string beans

String bean yield

== See also ==
- Legume
- List of bean soups
- List of legume dishes
- Mung bean
