= How to Talk Minnesotan =

2013 book by Howard Mohr

How to Talk Minnesotan: Revised for the 21st Century
- Author: Howard Mohr
- Language: English - Dialects - Minnesota
- Published: New York, NY
- Publisher: Penguin Books
- Publication date: 2013
- Pages: 264
- ISBN: 9780143122692 3rd ed
- Dewey Decimal: 427.97760207

How to Talk Minnesotan is a book by Howard Mohr (March 20, 1939 – September 4, 2022), a former writer for A Prairie Home Companion. Published in 1987, the book provides examples of stereotypical Minnesotan speech and mannerisms. There was a musical version by Mohr and Drew Jansen (produced at Plymouth Playhouse by Troupe America, Inc.). The book was also adapted as a television special, which was produced by KTCA and first broadcast January 1, 1993.

Some of the things the book covers:

- Useful phrases such as "You bet", "That's different", and "Whatever"
- Not accepting food until the third time it's offered
- The art of waving
- Hotdishes
- Loons
- Talking about cars and starting cars in the winter
- The Minnesotan "long goodbye"

Much of the material for the book was originally performed as sketches on A Prairie Home Companion. The book also includes fictional ads for improbable businesses such as "Raw Bits Cereal", "Polka Pants", and "Walleye Phone Company".

== See also ==
- North Central American English
