= Green bean casserole =

American dish from the 1950s

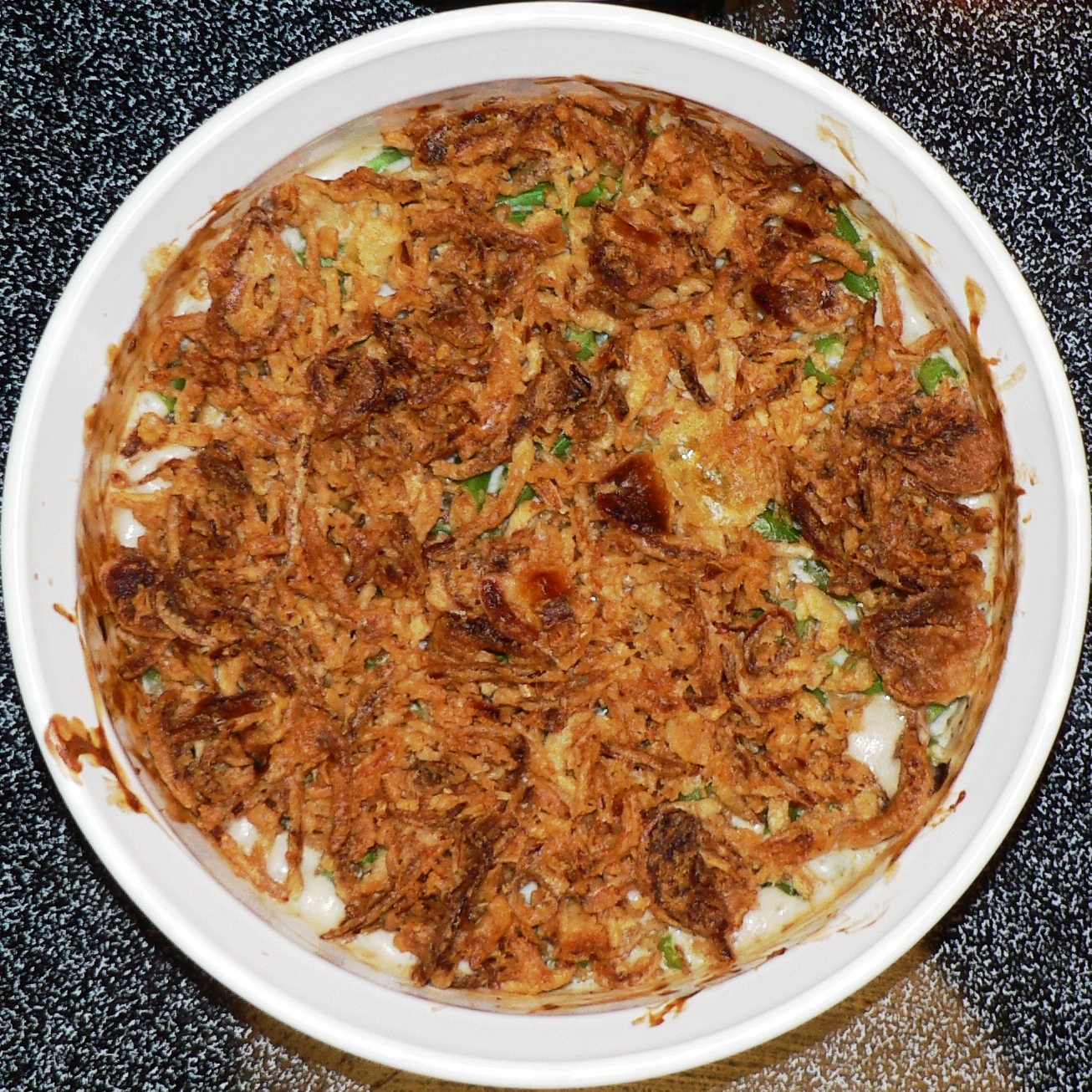
- Green bean casserole covered with fried onions
- Course: Side dish
- Place of origin: United States
- Created by: Dorcas Reilly for Campbell's Soup in 1955
- Main ingredients: Green beans, cream of mushroom soup, french fried onion

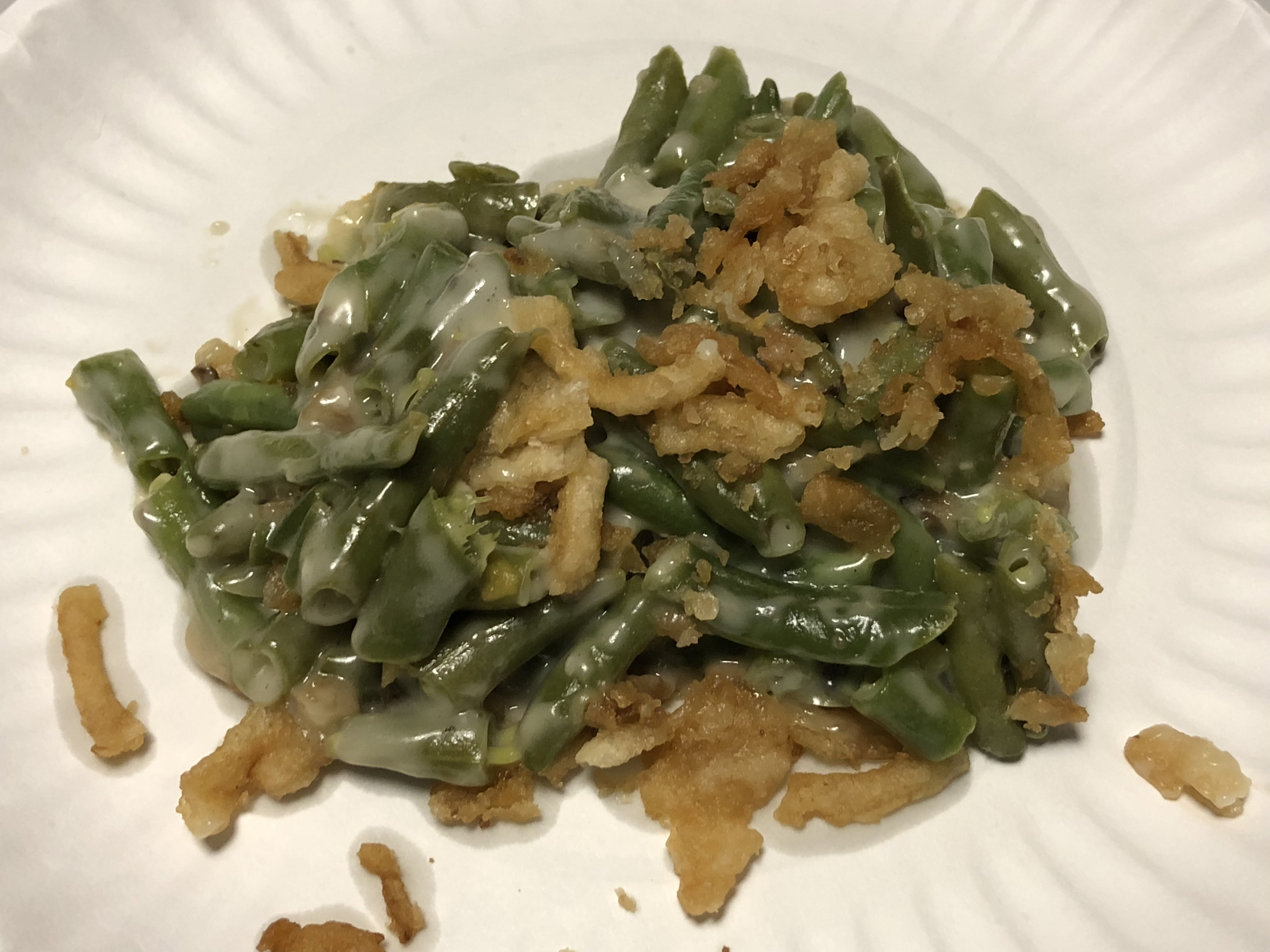
A serving of green bean casserole

Green bean casserole is an American baked dish consisting primarily of green beans, cream of mushroom soup, and crisp fried onions. It was popularized in the United States from a recipe printed on a soup can starting in the 1950s.

The casserole is a popular side dish for Thanksgiving dinners in the United States and has been described as iconic. The recipe was created in 1955 by Dorcas Reilly at Campbell's. As of 2020, Campbell's estimated it was served in 20 million Thanksgiving dinners in the United States each year and that 40% of the company's cream of mushroom soup sales go into a version of the dish.

== Background ==
Campbell's started producing cream of mushroom soup in 1934, and it was the first of the company's soups to be marketed as a sauce as well as a soup. It became so widely used as casserole filler in the hotdish recipes popular in Minnesota, where Lutheranism is common, that it was sometimes referred to as "Lutheran binder". Like other food companies, Campbell's employed recipe developers to create recipes using their products as part of their marketing strategy.

== History of the recipe ==
Dorcas Reilly (1926–2018) created the recipe in 1955 while working in the home economics department at the Campbell's Soup Company in Camden, New Jersey. The recipe was created for a feature article for the Associated Press; the requirement was for a quick and easy dish using ingredients most US households kept on hand.

It was called "Green Bean Bake" when the recipe was first printed on soup cans. Initially the dish did not test well within the company but, in part because of Reilly's persistence, eventually earned a reputation for being "the ultimate comfort food". Culinary historian Laura Shapiro called the recipe's use of the crunchy fried onion topping a "touch of genius" that gave an otherwise ordinary convenience-food side dish a bit of "glamour".

Food & Wine called it iconic, and Good Housekeeping said that "few dishes are as iconic" as the green bean casserole.

== Popularity ==
It was originally marketed as an everyday side dish but became popular for Thanksgiving dinners in the 1960s after Campbell's placed the recipe on the can's label. The recipe popularized the combination of the soup with green beans. Campbell's Soup now estimates that 40 percent of the Cream of Mushroom soup sold in the United States goes into making green bean casserole. As of 2020 Campbell's estimated it was served in 20 million Thanksgiving dinners in the US each year. Campbell's in 2020 reported their online version of the recipe is viewed 4 million times each Thanksgiving Day. According to Campbell's as of 2018, the recipe is the most popular ever developed in their kitchens.

Folklorist Lucy Long in 2007 noted that its inclusion on Thanksgiving dinner tables crosses ethnic, socioeconomic, and religious differences. She also notes it is included in most popular American cookbooks, mentioned in the media regularly, and referred to a "classic", "traditional", and "a Thanksgiving standard". She wrote that the popularity of the dish was related to its categorization as a casserole, which in the US is associated with "communal eating, sharing, and generosity" and that the green bean casserole in particular represents the familiar and also the festive.

== Ingredients ==
The current recipe, as of 2020, calls for green beans, mushroom soup, milk, soy sauce, ground black pepper, and crisp fried onions. The beans, soup, milk, and seasonings are mixed with a portion of the onions and baked, then topped with more onions and baked for another few minutes.

Multiple similar recipes were developed to "update" or "upgrade" the original recipe to use fresh beans, homemade cream sauce, and fresh mushrooms as the convenience-food based recipes of the 1950s and 1960s became less fashionable, but according to culinary historian Shapiro, the green bean casserole remains popular for Thanksgiving because of nostalgia. Other recipes have been developed, by Campbell's and others, that incorporate a variety of methods and ingredients in addition to or in replacement of those in the original. In a reversal, Cassandra Peterson included an even more ultra-processed version of the dish, swapping out the cream of mushroom soup with processed cheese product and the onions with potato chips, preferably crushed by sitting on them; she included this recipe, which she considers her favorite, in her Elvira's Cookbook from Hell.

== Creator ==
In November of 2002, Reilly, representing Campbell's, donated the original recipe card to the National Inventors Hall of Fame in Akron, Ohio. The donation was followed by a meal featuring the dish. Reilly died 15 October of 2018 at the age of 92 in her hometown of Camden, New Jersey.

== See also ==
- List of casserole dishes
- Marketing
- Creamed spinach
