= Cream of mushroom soup =

Type of soup

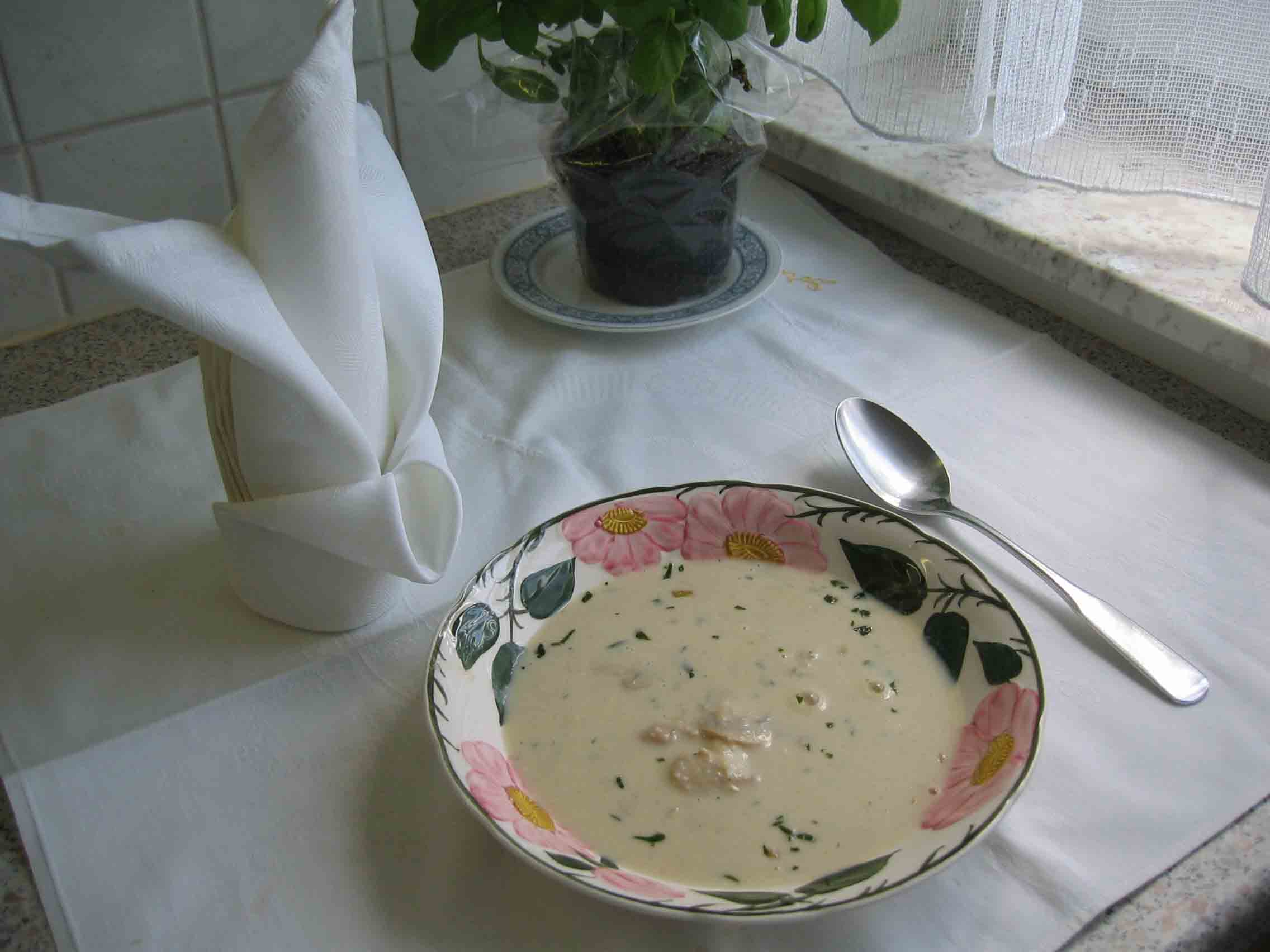
- Type: Soup
- Main ingredients: Roux, cream or milk, mushrooms or mushroom broth

Cream of mushroom soup is a simple type of soup where a basic roux is thinned with cream or milk and then mushrooms or mushroom broth are added.

In North America, it is a common canned condensed soup. Cream of mushroom soup is often used as a base ingredient in casseroles and comfort foods. This use is similar to that of a mushroom-flavored gravy.

== History ==
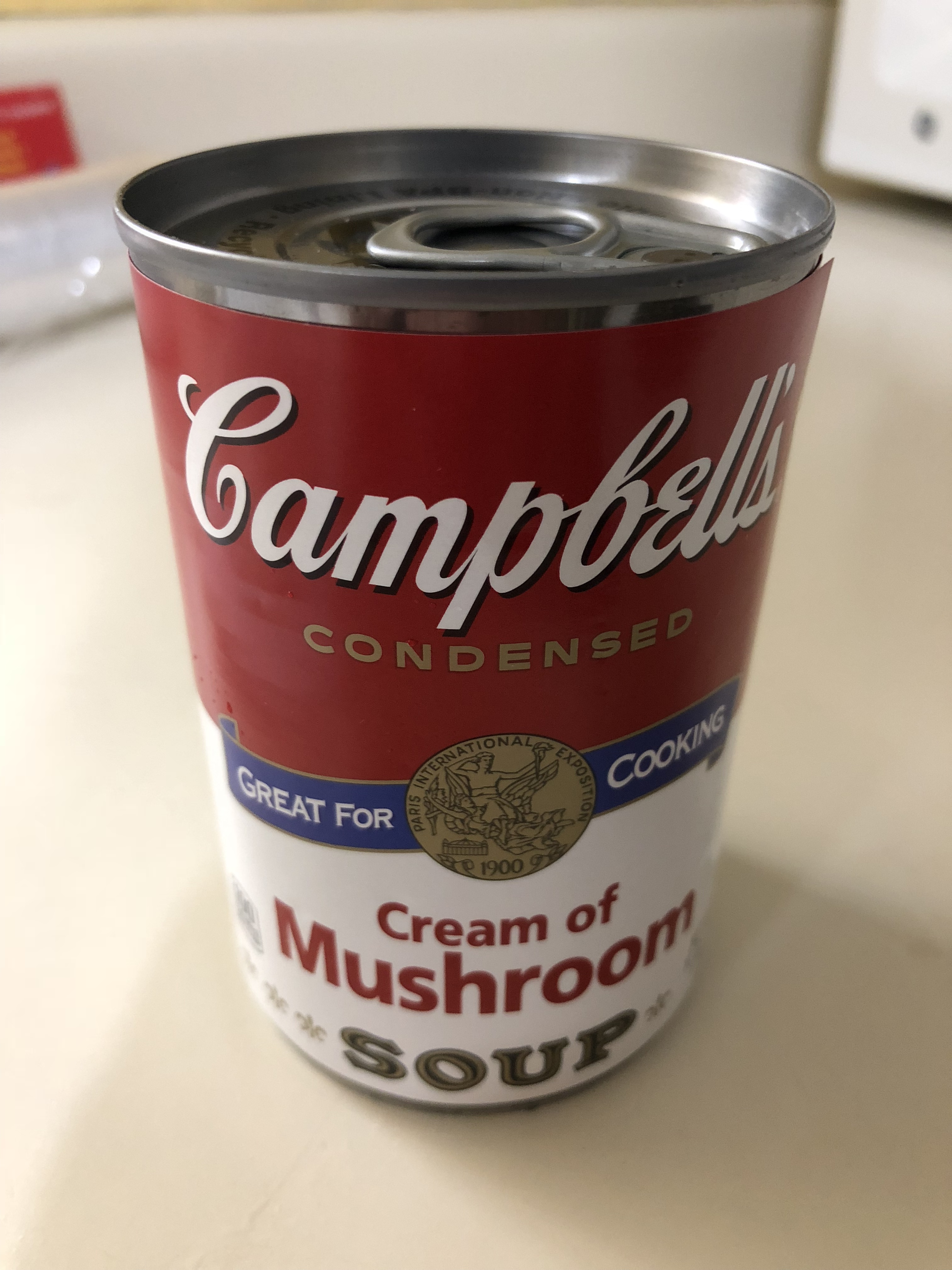
Can of Campbell's Condensed Cream of Mushroom Soup

Soups made with cream and mushrooms have been made for many hundreds of years, based on French (béchamel) cream sauces. In America, the Campbell's began producing its canned Cream of Mushroom Soup in 1934. Home cooks had already been using canned soup as a casserole or sauce base, and Campbell's started publishing its own recipes based on it in 1941.

== Regional usage ==
Canned cream of mushroom soup has been described as "America's béchamel". In Minnesota, the ingredient is often called "Lutheran binder," in reference to its thickening properties and its prominence in hotdish recipes, especially in Lutheran church cookbooks.

== See also ==
- Bisque (food)
- Clam chowder
- Green bean casserole
- List of mushroom dishes
- List of cream soups
- Oyster stew
- List of soups
- Tuna casserole
- Vegetable soup
- List of vegetable soups
- Mushroom sauce
