= Porcupine meatballs =

American rice meatballs

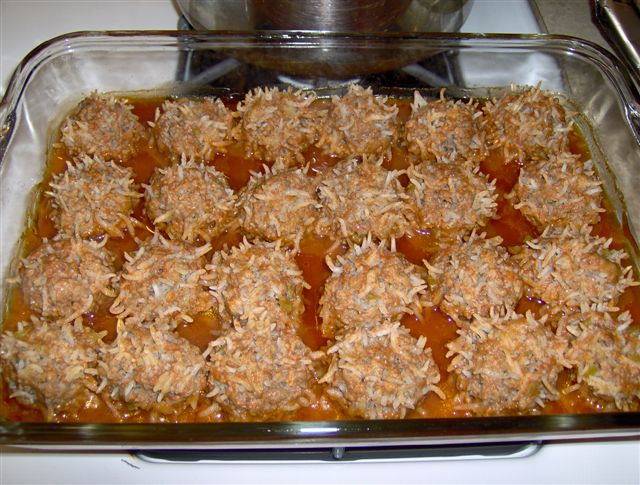
Porcupine meatballs

Porcupine meatballs are an American casserole dish of ground beef and rice meatballs cooked in tomato sauce. They were a staple during the Great Depression requiring only a few basic ingredients: ground beef, uncooked long-grain rice, onion, and canned tomato soup. The name comes from the appearance of the meatballs, which appear prickly when the rice pokes out of them as they cook, resembling a porcupine.

The dish became popular in the United States in the 1930s and 1940s during the Great Depression and World War II, when it was regarded as a low-cost and substantial meal for families attempting to maximize their limited resources. Rice, an affordable and filling ingredient, was commonly used as a binding agent in the meatballs, giving the meatballs their signature "spiky" look. Some think the dish might be an adaptation of meatball recipes prevalent in European cuisines, where rice and ground meat were often mixed together.

Porcupine meatballs can be made in the slow cooker or baked. They can be served with relish such as red cabbage or radish and mashed potatoes. Leftovers can be made into sandwiches.

The dish contains no porcupine meat.

== History ==
To make the dish the rice meatballs were pan-seared and slowly simmered in canned tomato soup. The dish continued to be popular into the 1970s. The recipe appears as "rice meat balls" in the 1918 cookbook "Conservation Recipes".

Other ingredients could be added to the meatballs like green pepper, mustard, celery, horseradish, Worcestershire sauce, ketchup, or other seasonings. The simple tomato sauce made with canned soup could be enriched with molasses and seasoned with chili powder and cumin. A later recipe from 1969 for "Porcupine meatballs paprika" replaces tomato soup with cream of mushroom, and adds other ingredients like mustard, or sour cream and paprika. "Porcupine meatballs Chinois" was a variation influenced by Chinese cooking techniques and ingredients. Served with peach sauce, the Chinois meatballs are made with ground pork, shrimp, rice and green onion, seasoned with soy sauce and sherry, and steamed instead of being cooked in sauce.
