= Christmas in Italy =

Christmas celebrations and traditions in Italy

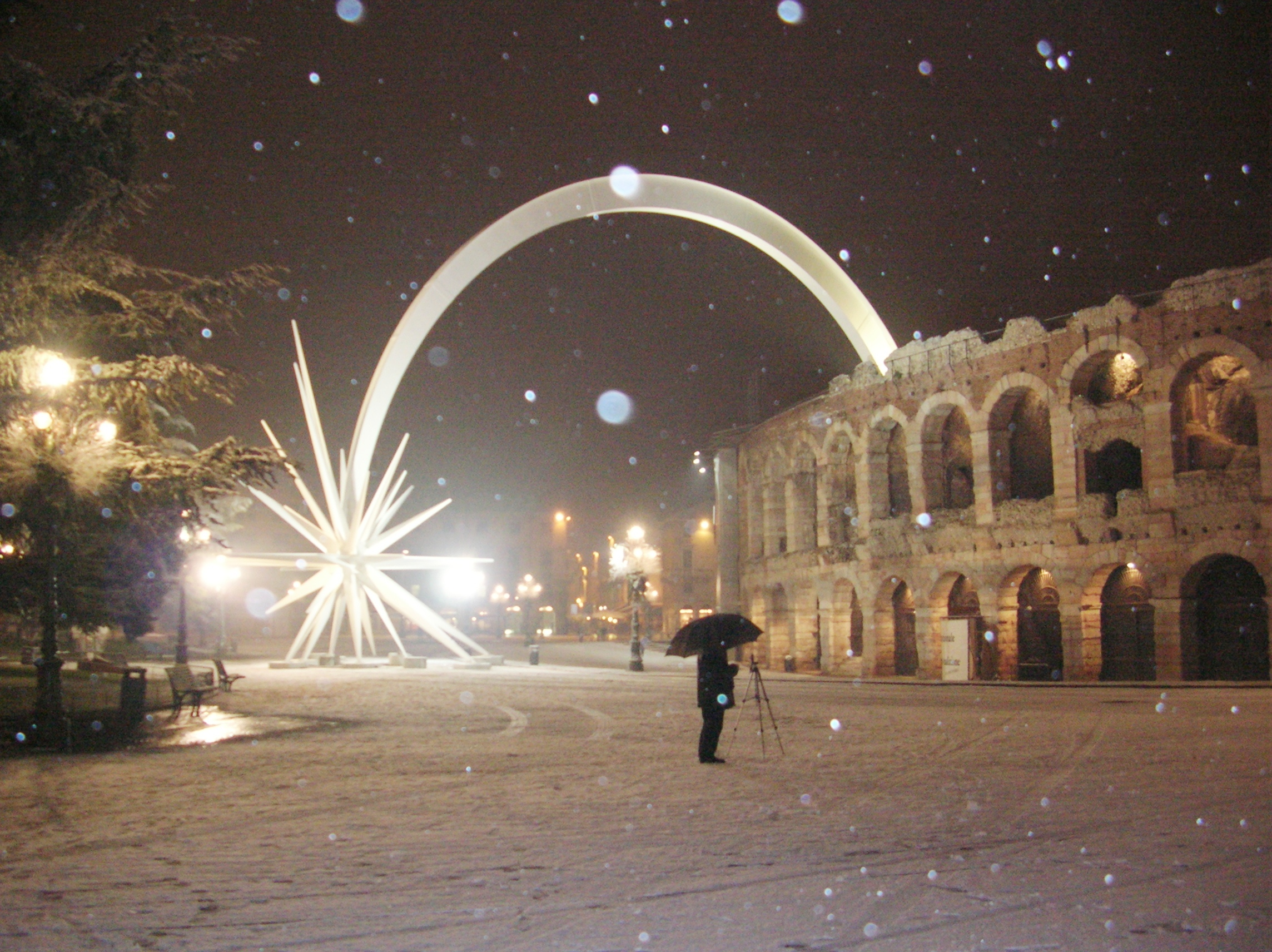
Christmas lights in Verona

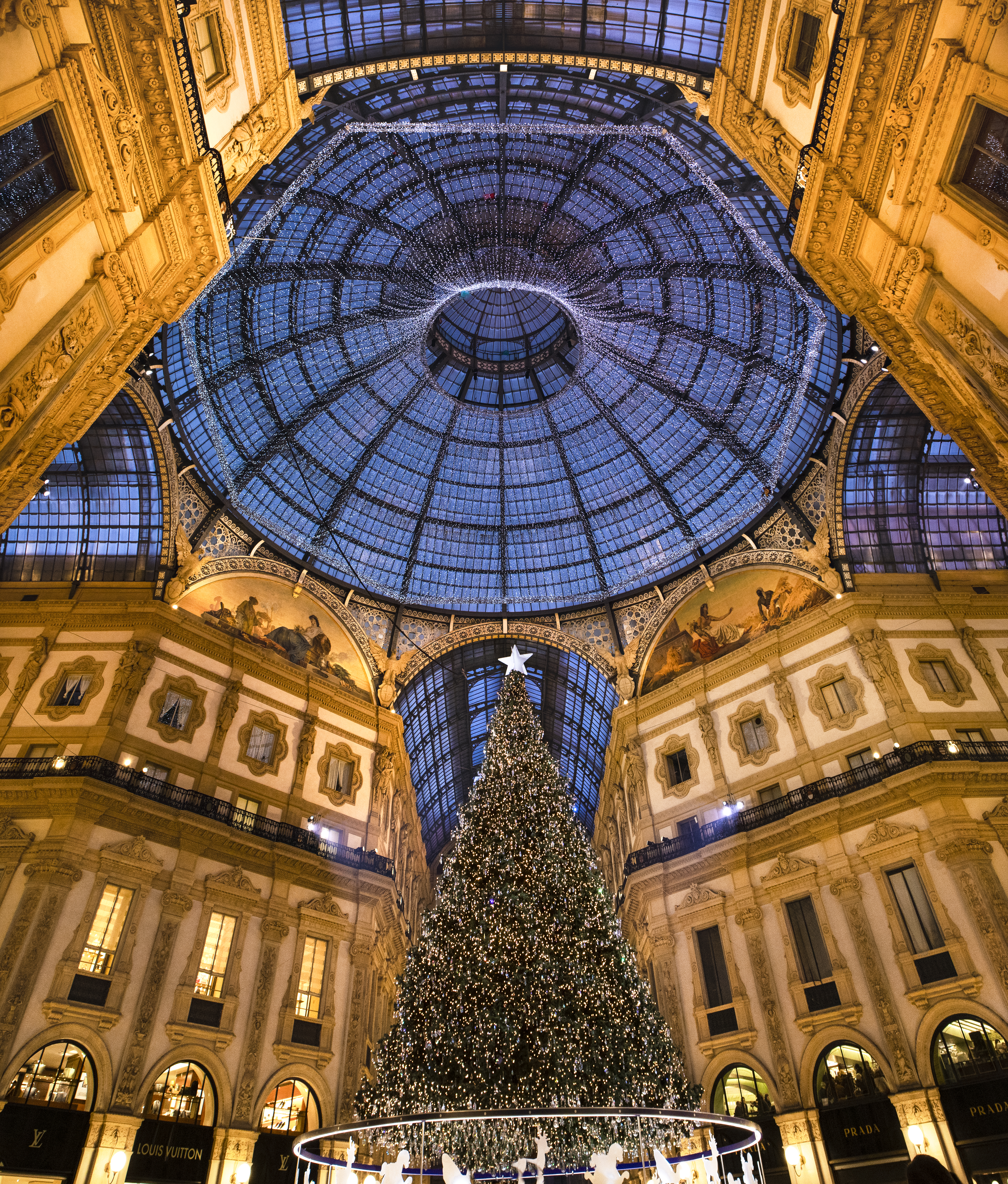
Christmas tree at Galleria Vittorio Emanuele II in Milan

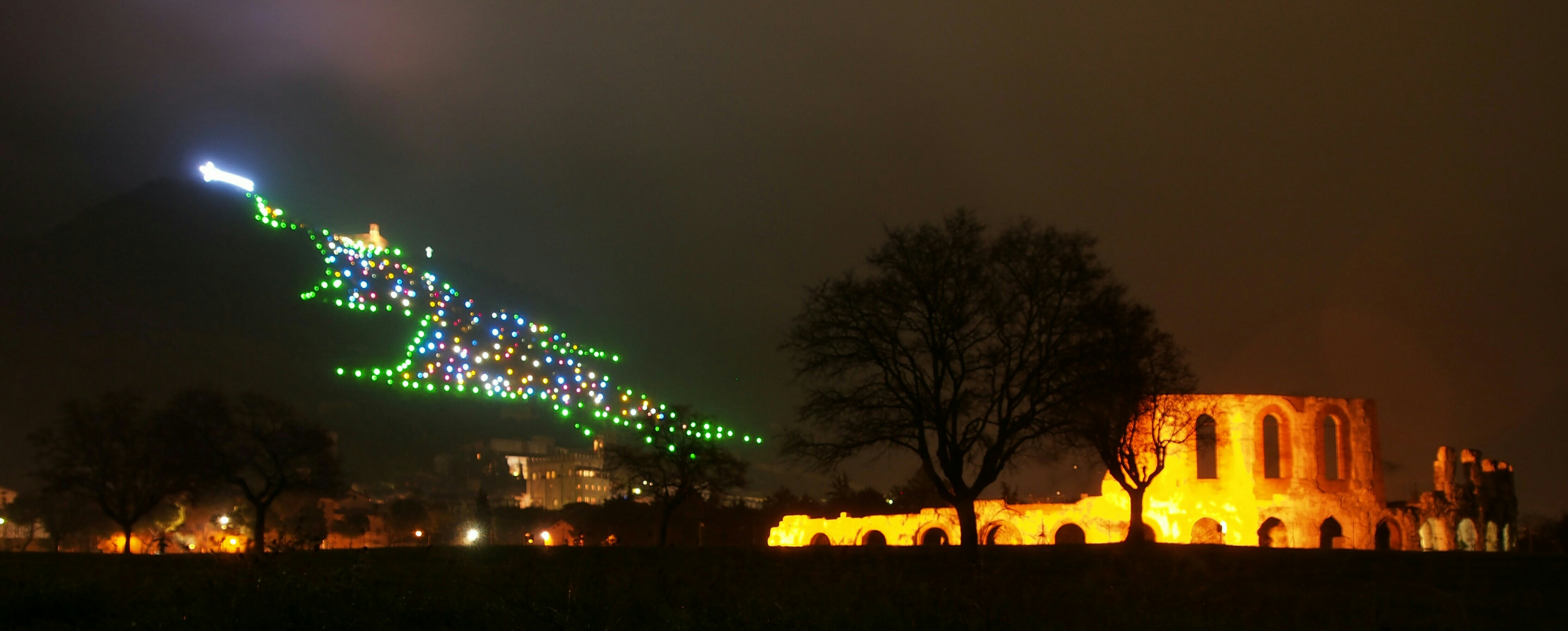
Mount Ingino Christmas Tree in Gubbio, the tallest Christmas tree in the world

Christmas in Italy (Italian: Natale, pronounced [naˈtaːle]) begins on 8 December, with the Feast of the Immaculate Conception, the day on which traditionally the Christmas tree is mounted and ends on 6 January, of the following year with the Epiphany (Italian: Epifania [epifaˈniːa]), and in some areas female puppets are burned on a pyre (called falò), to symbolize, along with the end of the Christmas period, the death of the old year and the beginning of a new one. 26 December (Saint Stephen's Day, in Italian Giorno di Santo Stefano), is also a public holiday in Italy. The Italian term Natale derives from the Latin natalis, which literally means 'birth', and the greetings in Italian are buon Natale (Merry Christmas) and felice Natale (lit. 'happy Christmas').

The tradition of the nativity scene comes from Italy. One of the earliest representation in art of the nativity was found in the early Christian Roman catacomb of Saint Valentine. The first seasonal nativity scene, which seems to have been a dramatic rather than sculptural rendition, is attributed to Saint Francis of Assisi (died 1226). Francis' 1223 nativity scene in Greccio is commemorated on the calendars of the Catholic, Lutheran and Anglican liturgical calendars, and its creation is described by Saint Bonaventure in his Life of Saint Francis of Assisi c. 1260. Nativity scenes were popularised by Saint Francis of Assisi from 1223, quickly spreading across Europe. It seems that the first Christmas tree in Italy was erected at the Quirinal Palace at the behest of Queen Margherita, towards the end of the 19th century. Mount Ingino Christmas Tree in Gubbio is the tallest Christmas tree in the world. In Italy, the oldest Christmas market is considered to be that of Bologna, held for the first time in the 18th century and linked to the feast of Saint Lucy. Typical bearers of gifts from the Christmas period in Italy are Saint Lucy (December 13), Christ Child, Babbo Natale (the name given to Santa Claus), and, on Epiphany, the Befana.

According to tradition, the Christmas Eve dinner must not contain meat. A popular Christmas Day dish in Naples and in southern Italy is eel or capitone, which is a female eel. A traditional Christmas Day dish from northern Italy is capon (gelded chicken). Abbacchio is more common in central Italy. The Christmas Day dinner traditionally consists by typical Italian Christmas dishes, such as agnolini, cappelletti, agnolotti pavesi, panettone, pandoro, torrone, panforte, struffoli, mustacciuoli, bisciola, cavallucci, veneziana, pizzelle, zelten, or others, depending on the regional cuisine. Christmas on 25 December is celebrated with a family lunch, also consisting of different types of pasta and meat dishes, cheese and local sweets.

== History ==
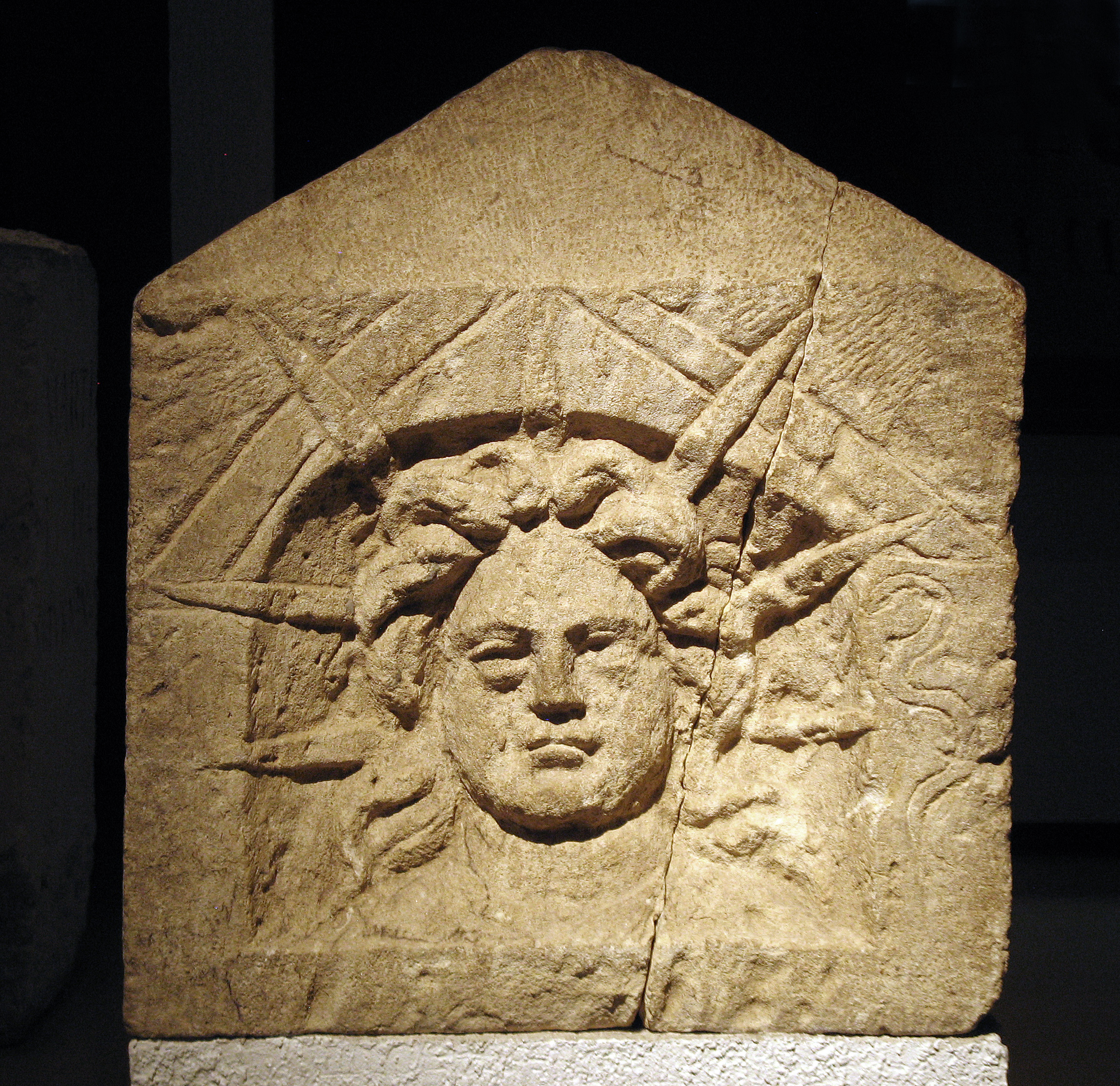
A relief of Sol Invictus from Roman Lugdunum, 2nd–3rd century CE

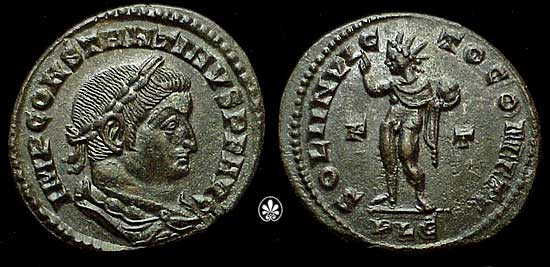
Coin of Emperor Constantine I depicting Sol Invictus with the legend SOLI INVICTO COMITI, c. 315

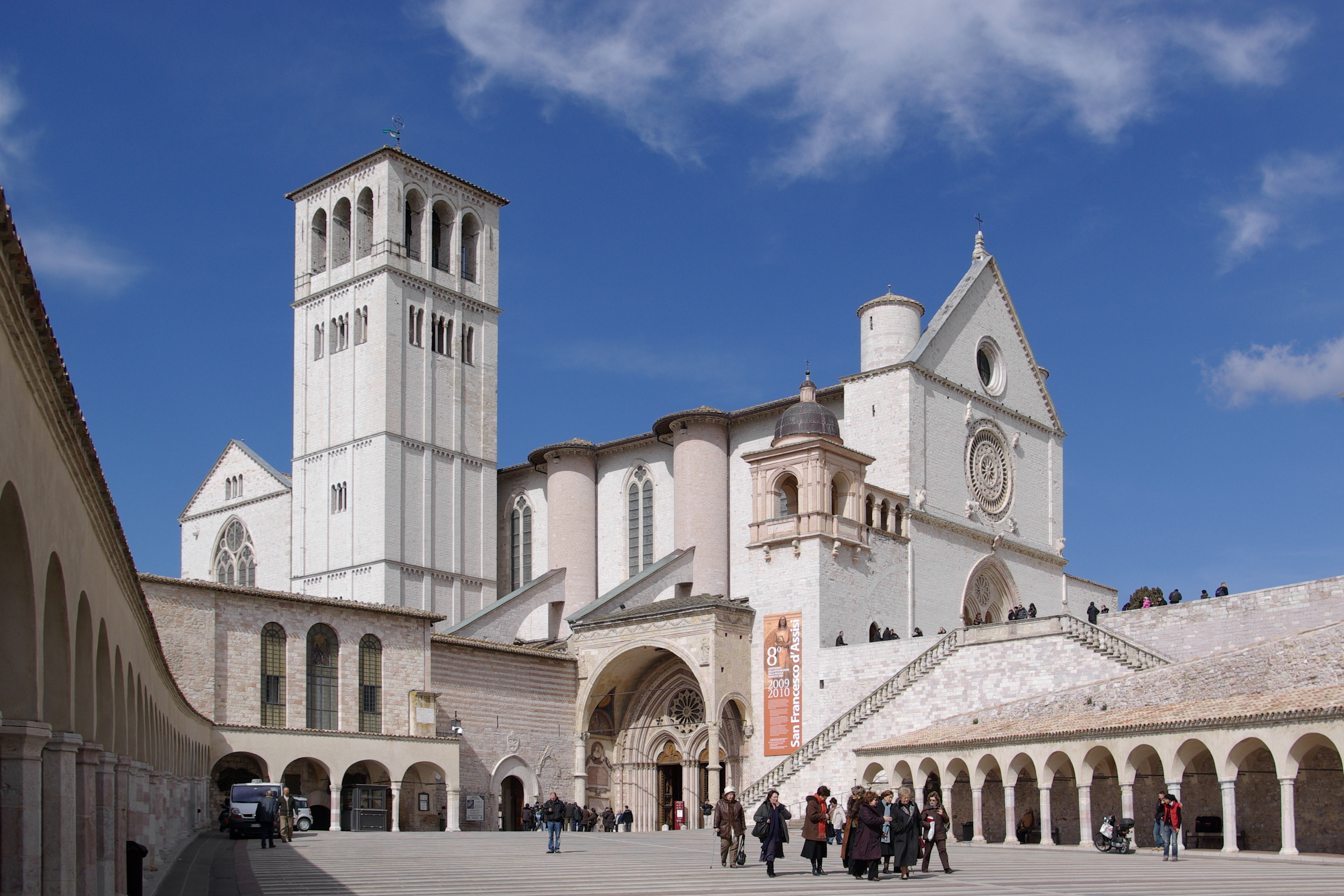
Catholic Basilica of Saint Francis of Assisi. Saint Francis is one of the patron saints of Italy.

Christianity spread to Italy early, and by the 4th century, Christmas was first celebrated as the birth of Jesus Christ. The Catholic Church established December 25th as the official date for Christmas, aligning it with the Roman festival of Sol Invictus (the birthday of the "Unconquered Sun"), which was celebrated around the same time. This helped to ease the conversion of pagan customs into Christian celebrations.

Sol Invictus, "Invincible Sun" or "Unconquered Sun", was the official sun god of the late Roman Empire and a later version of the god Sol. The emperor Aurelian revived his cult in 274 AD and promoted Sol Invictus as the chief god of the empire. From Aurelian onward, Sol Invictus often appeared on imperial coinage, usually shown wearing a sun crown and driving a horse-drawn chariot through the sky. His prominence lasted until the emperor Constantine I legalized Christianity and restricted paganism. (Note: "Up to the conversion of Constantine the Great, the cult of Deus Sol Invictus received the full support of the emperors: the many coins showing the sun god that these emperors struck provide official evidence of this." and "the custom of representing Deus Sol Invictus on coins came to an end in AD 323".) The last known inscription referring to Sol Invictus dates to AD 387, (Note: "Corpus Inscriptionum Latinarum CIL VI, 1778 dates from 387 AD") although there were enough devotees in the 5th century that the Christian theologian Augustine found it necessary to preach against them. (Note: Augustine, Sermones, XII; also in Ennaratio in Psalmum XXV; Ennaratio II, 3.)

In recent years, the scholarly community has become divided on Sol between traditionalists and a growing group of revisionists. In the traditional view, Sol Invictus was the second of two different sun gods in Rome. The first of these, Sol Indiges, or Sol, was believed to be an early Roman god of minor importance whose cult had petered out by the 1st century AD. Sol Invictus, on the other hand, was believed to be a Syrian sun god whose cult was first promoted in Rome under Elagabalus, without success. Some fifty years later, in 274 AD, Aurelian established the cult of Sol Invictus as an official religion. There has never been consensus on which Syrian sun god he might have been: some scholars opted for the sky god of Emesa, Elagabal, while others preferred Malakbel of Palmyra. In the revisionist view, there was only one cult of Sol in Rome, continuous from the monarchy to the end of antiquity. There were at least three temples of Sol in Rome, all active during the Empire and all dating from the earlier Republic.

Before the unification of Italy, a large part of the Italian peninsula was part of the Papal States. After the unification in 1860, due to French aid, the Pope maintained control over Rome and Lazio. This ended on 20 September 1870, shortly after the defeat of Napoleon III. The Kingdom of Italy moved its capital to Rome and the Catholic Church lost any remaining temporal power.

The defeat of the Pope by the Kingdom of Italy gave rise to a long period of antagonism between ecclesiastical and Italian powers. This resulted in the Catholic Church suggesting its believers not to take part in the affairs of the country and the consequent secularisation of Italian politics. The Kingdom of Italy and the Catholic Church managed to reapproach under Fascist Italy with the stipulation of the Lateran Treaty. Among other things, the treaty allowed for the foundation of the Vatican City, a microstate over which the Holy See has full jurisdiction. The Lateran Treaty survived the fall of Fascism and the establishment of the Republic and was significantly amended in 1984.

One of Italy's most iconic Christmas traditions is the presepe or nativity scene. The custom is attributed to St. Francis of Assisi, who, in 1223, created the first living nativity scene in Greccio to help bring the Christmas story to life for the people. Over time, the presepe became a beloved tradition, with families and towns creating intricate displays of the nativity. Naples is particularly famous for its elaborate presepi (plural of presepe), which often include a wide array of figures and even scenes of daily life from 18th-century Naples.

== Generality ==
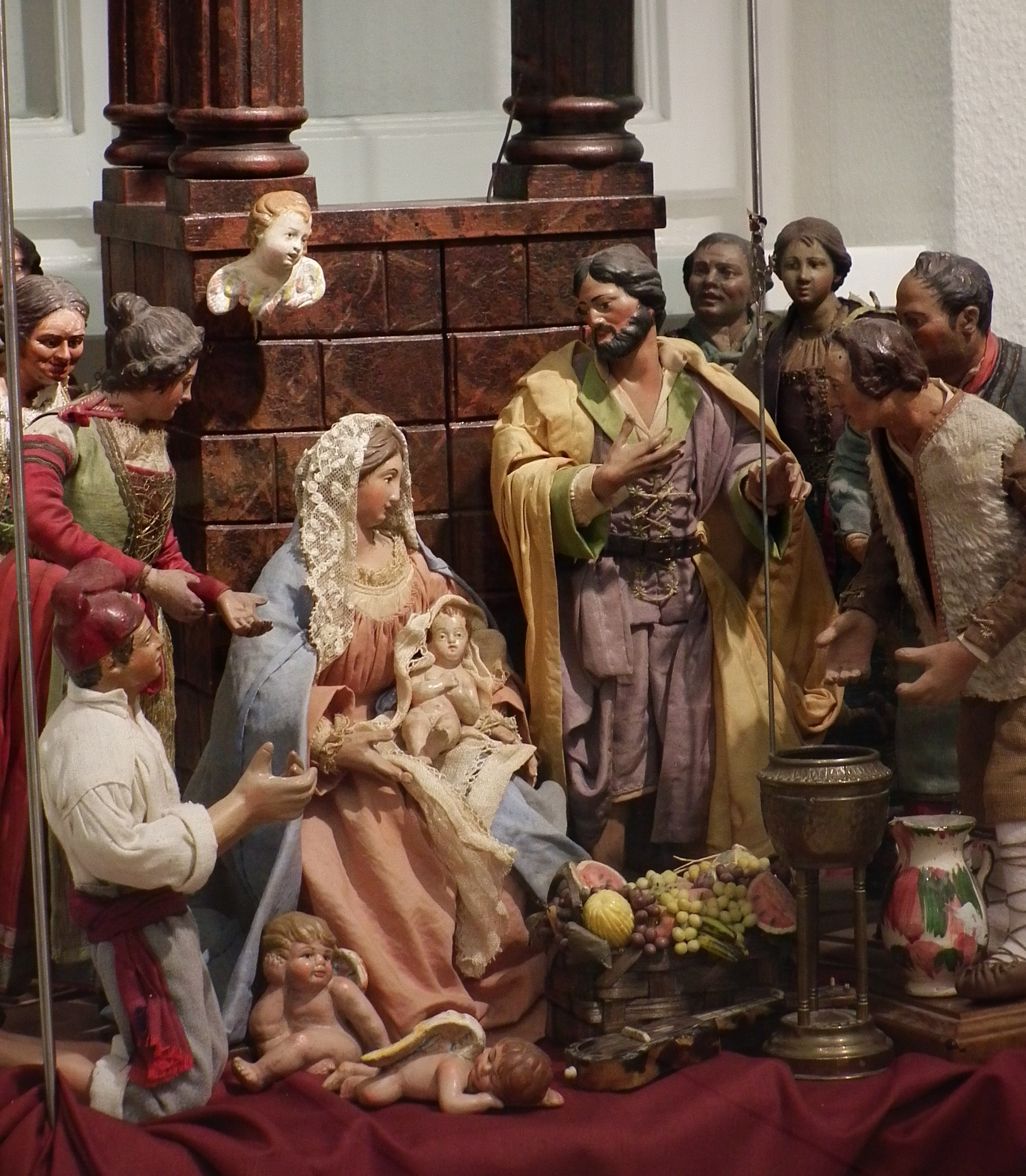
Neapolitan nativity scene in Naples

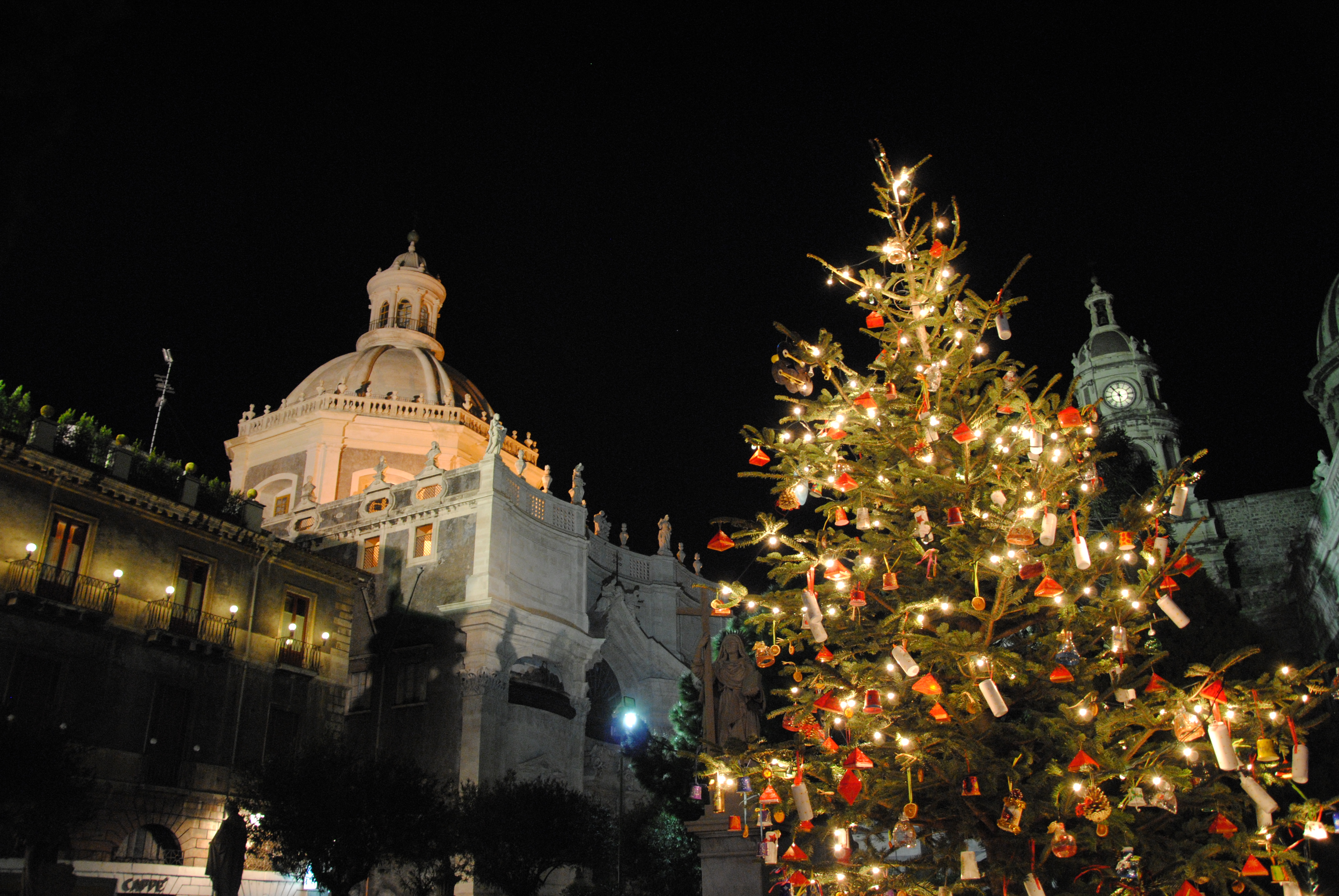
Christmas tree in Catania

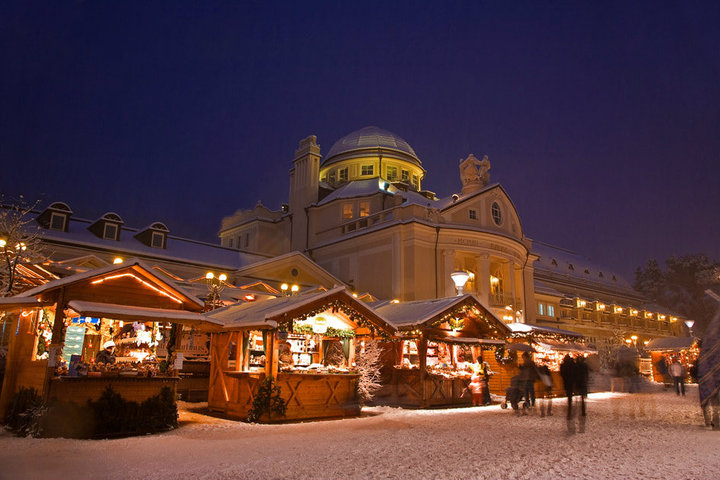
Christmas market in Merano

The Feast of the Immaculate Conception (Italian: Festa dell'Immacolata Concezione) on 8 December is a national holiday in Italy. Christmas decorations, including the presepe (nativity scene), as well as the Christmas tree, are usually put up on this day. 26 December (Saint Stephen's Day, in Italian Giorno di Santo Stefano), is also a public holiday in Italy. Festivities extend to the end of the year and then to the Epiphany on 6 January.

In Italy, Saint Stephen's Day became a public holiday in 1947, where previously it was a normal working day; the Catholic Church also celebrates it as a religious holiday, even if not as a precept, as it is in Germany and other German-speaking countries. The reason for the public holiday in Italy, not required by the Catholic Church despite the fame of the saint, is to be found in the intention of prolonging the Christmas holiday, creating two consecutive public holidays, which also happens in the case of Easter Monday, a non-religious holiday. Before 1947, the two days were working days, with banks and offices open.

Traditions regarding the exchanging of gifts vary from region to region, as this may take place either on Christmas Eve or on Christmas Day. Presents for children are left underneath the Christmas tree either by Santa Claus (called Babbo Natale) or, according to older traditions, by Baby Jesus himself. In some regions children receive gifts earlier (at St. Lucy's Day) or later (on Epiphany). On 6 January (Epiphany, in Italian Epifania) decorations are usually taken down, and in some areas female puppets are burned on a pyre (called falò), to symbolize, along with the end of the Christmas period, the death of the old year and the beginning of a new one.

Christmas is celebrated in Italy in a similar fashion to other Western European countries, with a strong emphasis given to the Christian meaning of the holiday and its celebration by the Catholic Church, also reinforced by the still widespread tradition of setting up the presepe, a tradition initiated by Saint Francis of Assisi. It is quite common to attend Midnight Mass on Christmas Eve and practice the old custom of abstinence from meat on the day (but not fasting, which is observed by the Eastern Orthodox Church).

The Christmas Day dinner traditionally consists of typical Italian Christmas dishes, such as agnolini, cappelletti, agnolotti pavesi, capon, lamb, eel, panettone, pandoro, torrone, panforte, struffoli, mustacciuoli, bisciola, cavallucci, veneziana, pizzelle, zelten, or others, depending on the regional cuisine. Christmas on 25 December is celebrated with a family lunch, also consisting of different types of pasta and meat dishes, cheese and local sweets.

== Religious celebrations ==
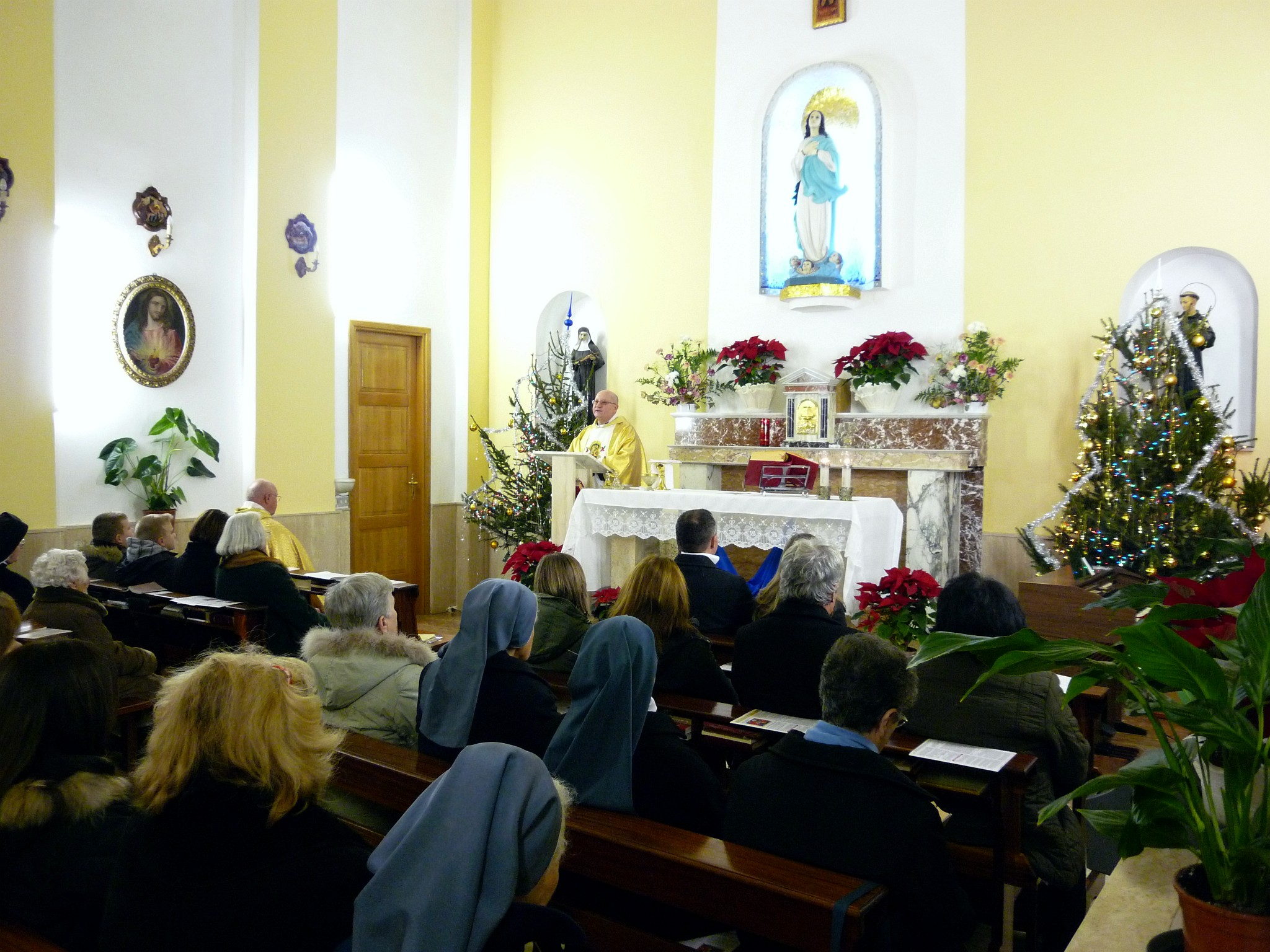
Midnight Mass in the Franciscan convent of Santa Severa

Starting from 16 December and until Christmas Eve, the Christmas novena is recited in the Catholic Church.

On 24 December, Christmas Eve, the Christmas night mass, also called Midnight Mass, is celebrated. On the night of 31 December, New Year's Eve, in the evening mass of the Solemnity of Mary, Mother of God, the Te Deum is typically sung as a sign of gratification for the past year.

== Saint Stephen's Day ==
In Italy, Saint Stephen's Day became a public holiday in 1947, where previously it was a normal working day; the Catholic Church also celebrates it as a religious holiday, even if not as a precept, as it is in Germany and other German-speaking countries. The reason for the public holiday in Italy, not required by the Catholic Church despite the fame of the saint, is to be found in the intention of prolonging the Christmas holiday, creating two consecutive public holidays, which also happens in the case of Easter Monday, a non-religious holiday, but which only wants to lengthen Easter. Before 1947 the two days were working days, with banks and offices open.

== Popular traditions ==
=== Nativity scene ===
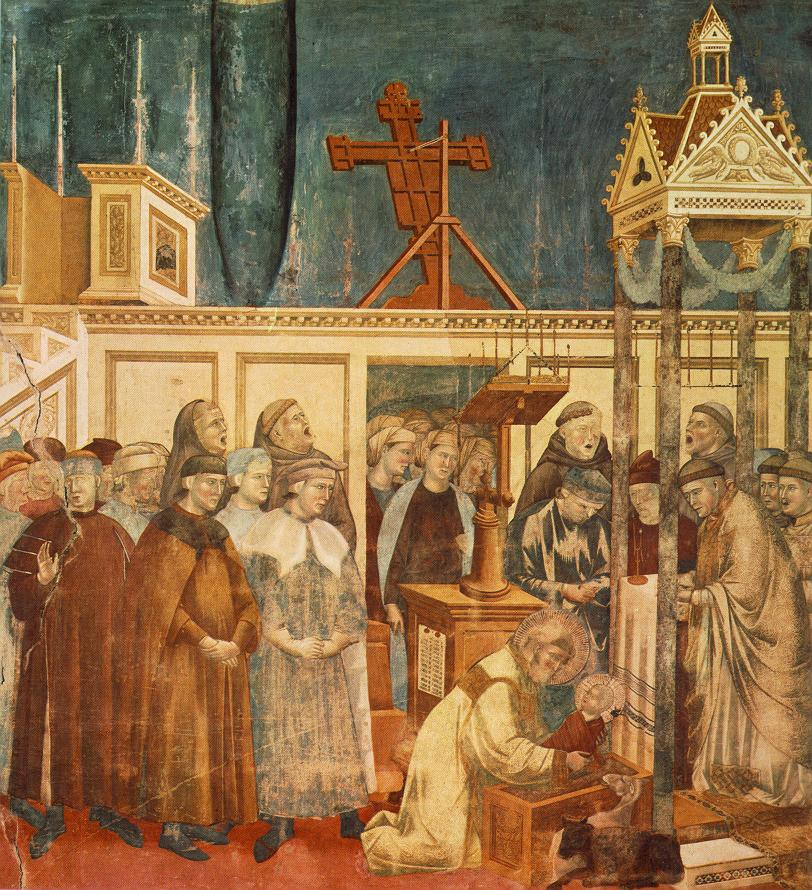
St. Francis at Greccio by Giotto, 1295

The tradition of the nativity scene (presepe) comes from Italy. One of the earliest representation in art of the nativity was found in the early Christian Roman catacomb of Saint Valentine. It dates to about AD 380. Another, of similar date, is beneath the pulpit in Sant'Ambrogio, Milan.

The first seasonal nativity scene, which seems to have been a dramatic rather than sculptural rendition, is attributed to Saint Francis of Assisi. Francis' 1223 nativity scene in Greccio is commemorated on the calendars of the Catholic, Lutheran and Anglican liturgical calendars, and its creation is described by Saint Bonaventure in his Life of Saint Francis of Assisi c. 1260. Nativity scenes were popularised by Saint Francis of Assisi from 1223, quickly spreading across Europe. In Italy, regional crib traditions then spread, such as that of the Bolognese crib, the Genoese crib and the Neapolitan crib.

In southern Italy, living nativity scenes (presepe vivente) are extremely popular. They may be elaborate affairs, featuring not only the classic nativity scene but also a mock rural 19th-century village, complete with artisans in traditional costumes working at their trades. These attract many visitors and have been televised on RAI, the national public broadcasting company of Italy. In 2010, the old city of Matera, Basilicata, hosted the world's largest living nativity scene of the time, which was performed in the historic center, Sassi.

=== Yule log ===
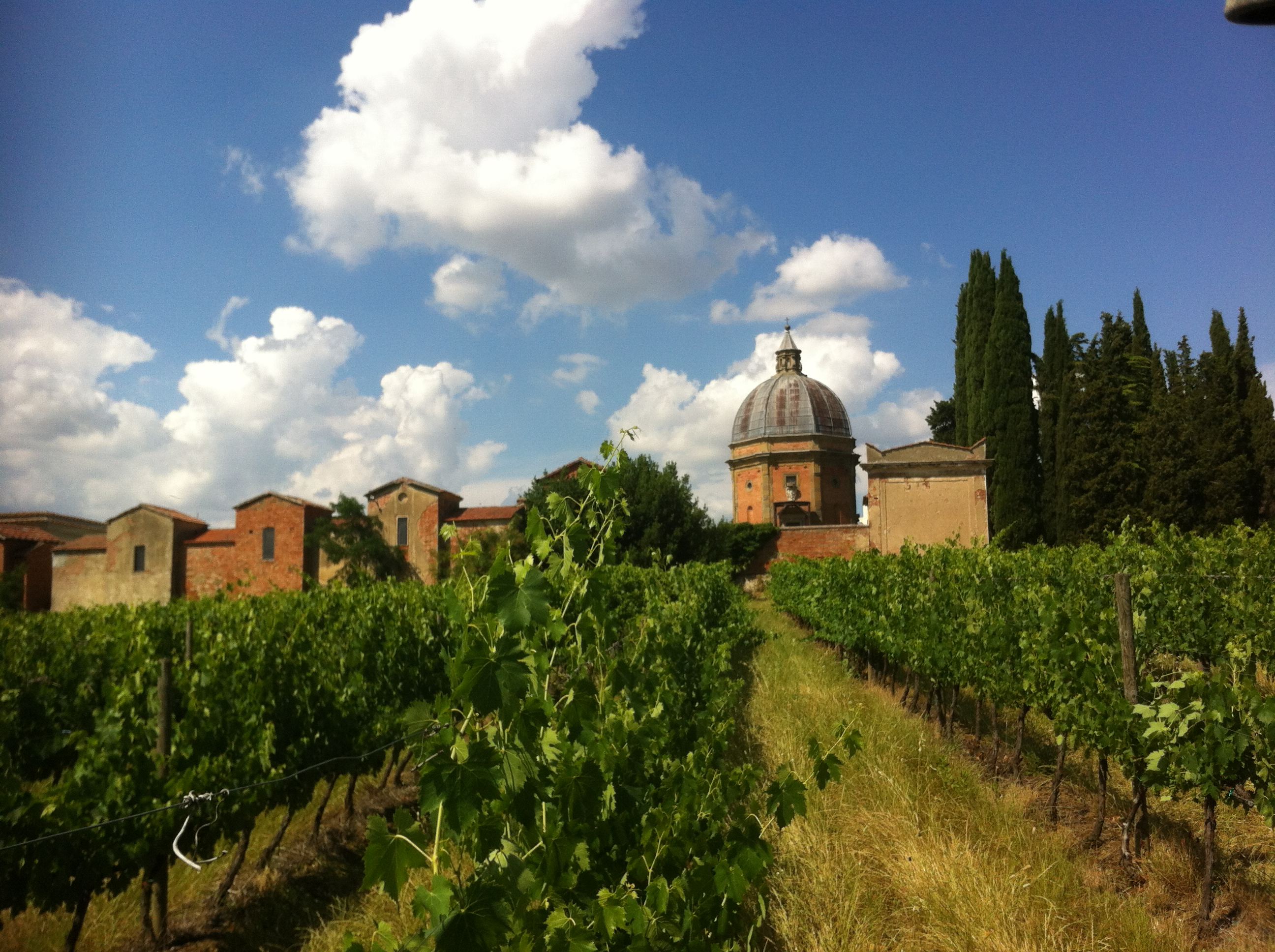
Valdichiana, Tuscany, where it was customary to sing a prayer during the cerimonia del ceppo ('log ceremony'). Later, blindfolded children (later rewarded with sweets and other gifts), had to hit the log, while the rest of the family sang a particular song, called "Ave Maria del Ceppo".

The tradition of the Yule log, once widespread, has been attested in Italy since the 11th century. A detailed description of this tradition is given in a book printed in Milan in the 14th century. The Yule log appears with different names depending on the region: in Tuscany it is known as ciocco, while in Lombardy it is known as zocco. In Valdichiana, Tuscany, it was customary for children, blindfolded, to hit the block with pincers, while the rest of the family sang a particular song, called "Ave Maria del Ceppo". That tradition was once deeply rooted in Italy is demonstrated by the fact that Christmas in Tuscany was called the "feast of the log".

=== Christmas tree ===
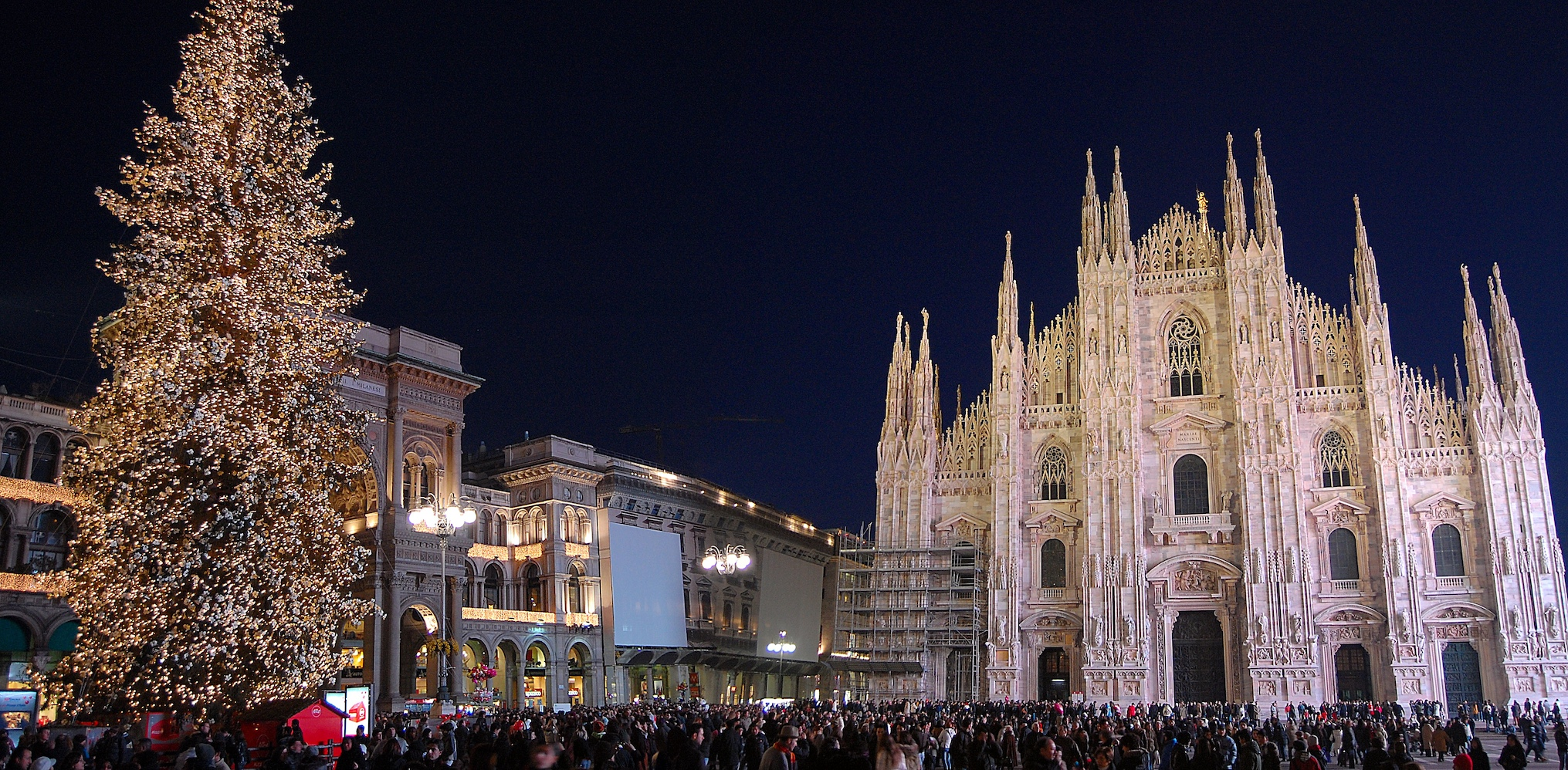
Christmas tree in Milan, in front of the Milan Cathedral

The tradition of the Christmas tree, of Germanic origin, was also widely adopted in Italy during the 20th century. It seems that the first Christmas tree in Italy was erected at the Quirinal Palace at the behest of Queen Margherita, towards the end of the 19th century.

During Fascism this custom was frowned upon and opposed (being considered an imitation of a foreign tradition), preferring the typically Italian nativity scene. In 1991, the Gubbio Christmas Tree, 650 meters high and decorated with over 700 lights, entered the Guinness Book of Records as the tallest Christmas tree in the world.

=== Christmas markets ===
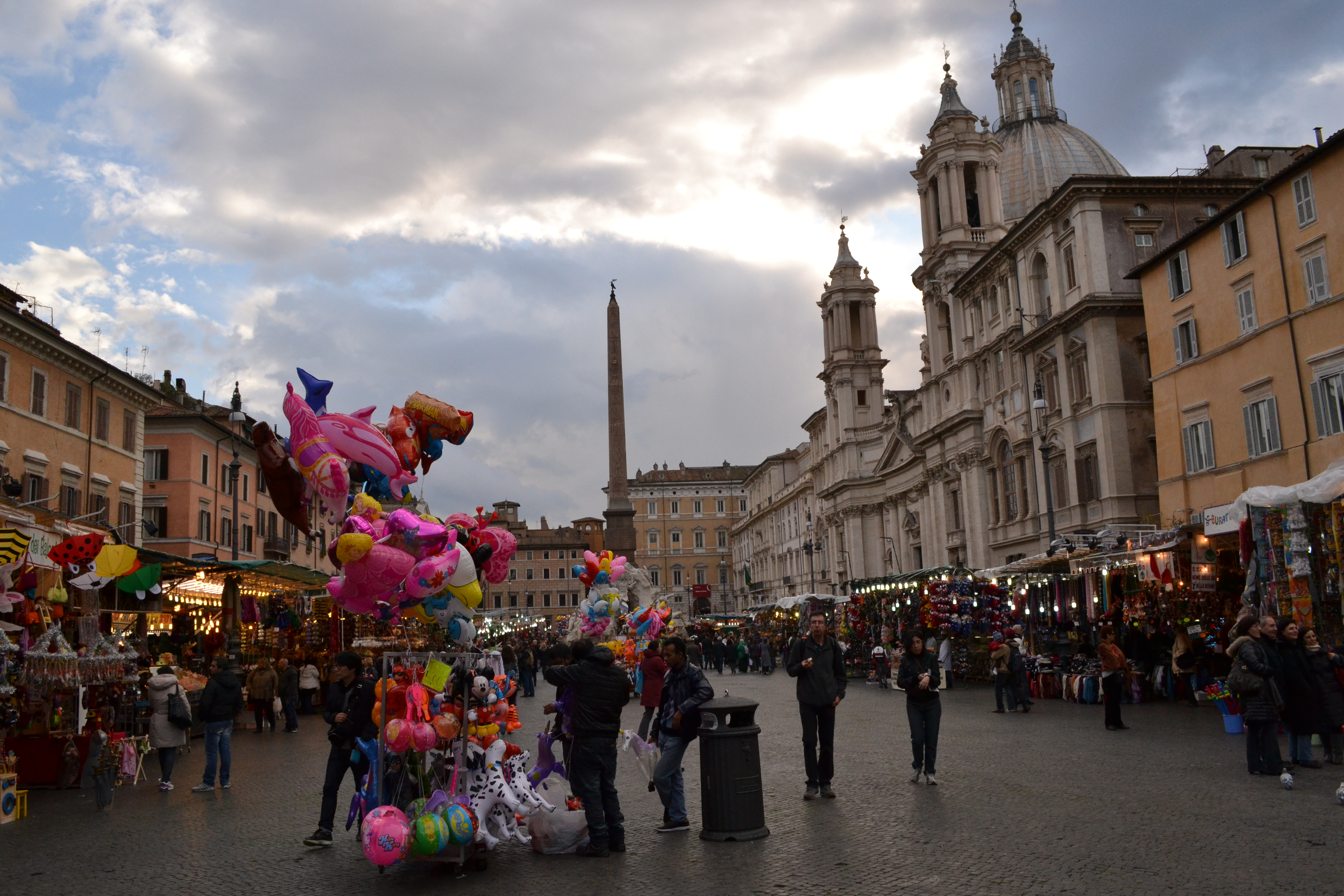
Christmas market at Piazza Navona in Rome

In Italy, Catholic religious fairs in Bologna, held for the first time in the 18th century and linked to the feast of Saint Lucy. The tradition of the markets has however spread in Italy predominantly especially since the 1990s of the 20th century, with the birth of the first modern markets: among these, the first ever was that of Bolzano, born in 1991, which was followed by others in the area of Alto Adige, in particular in Merano, Bressanone, Vipiteno and Brunico. The Trento Christmas market, established in 1993, is renowned in Trentino. In Naples, where the tradition of the Neapolitan nativity scene has been famous for centuries, the exhibition of the nativity scenes made in the city's artisan shops is held every year in via San Gregorio Armeno. Noteworthy are the Christmas markets at Piazza Navona in Rome, in Verona, in Gubbio, in Alberobello, in Aosta, in Turin, in Asti, in Arezzo, in Florence, in Trieste, in Livigno, in Santa Maria Maggiore, Arco and in Cison di Valmarino.

=== Zampognari ===
Zampognari in Molise during the Christmas period

Typically Italian tradition is instead that of the zampognari (sing.: zampognaro), or men dressed as shepherds and equipped with zampogna, a double chantered bagpipes, who come down from the mountains, playing Christmas music. This tradition, dating back to the 19th century, is particularly widespread in the south of the country.

A description of the Abruzzese zampognari is provided by Héctor Berlioz in 1832.

=== Bearers of gifts ===
Typical bearers of gifts from the Christmas period in Italy are Saint Lucy (13 December), Christ Child, Babbo Natale (the name given to Santa Claus), and, on Epiphany, the Befana.

==== Saint Lucy ====
Traditional bearer of gifts in some areas of northern Italy, such as Verona, Lodi, Cremona, Pavia, Brescia, Bergamo and Piacenza is Saint Lucy on the night between 12 and 13 December.

In Syracuse, Sicily, the local celebration of the same name lasts from 13 to 20 December. According to the Italian tradition, Saint Lucy shows up on her donkey and the children must leave a cup of tea for the saint and a plate of flour for the animal.

==== Christ Child ====
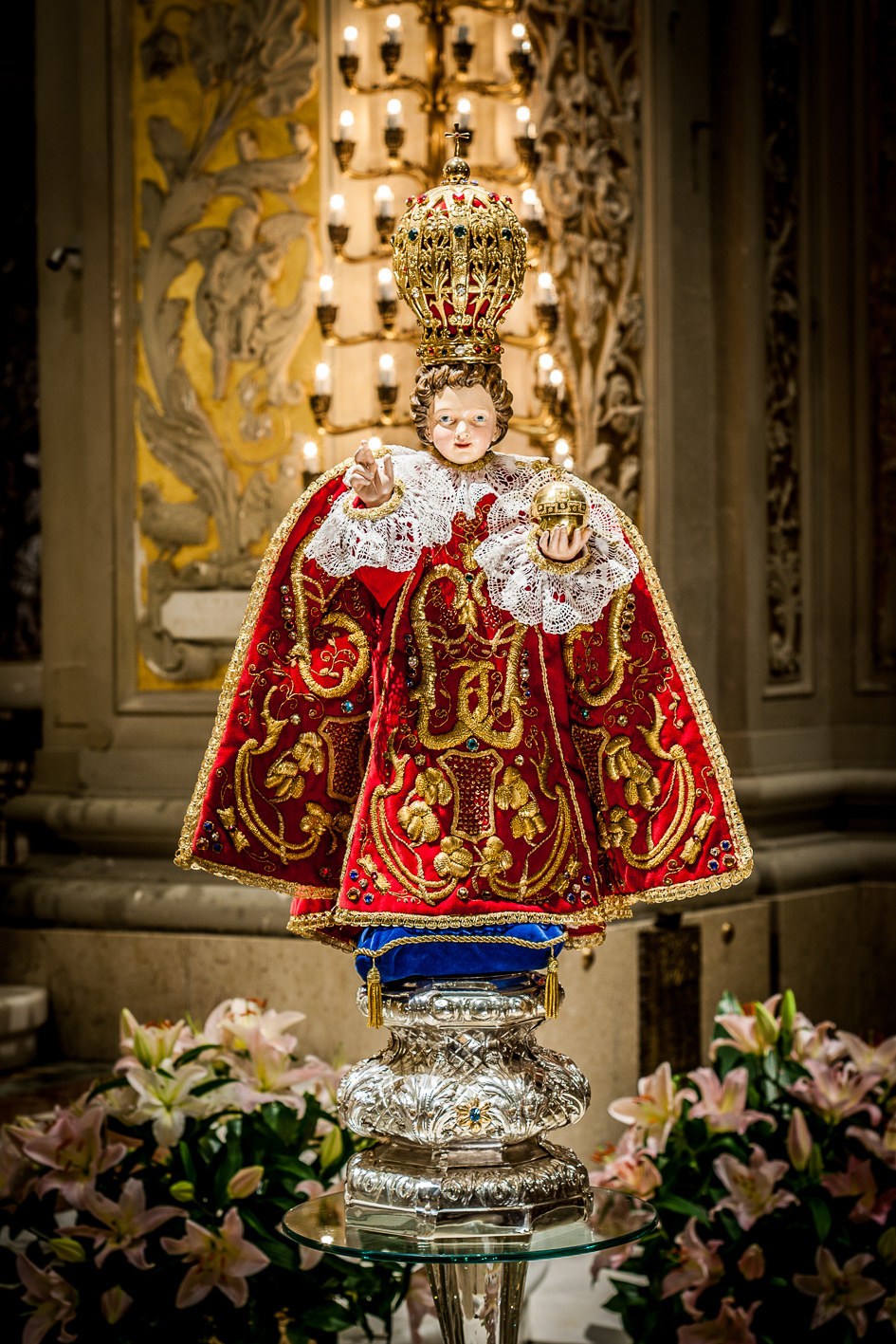
Bambino Gesù di Arenzano

The Christ Child (Italian: Bambino Gesù, Gesù Bambino or Santo Bambino), also known as Divine Infant, Baby Jesus, Infant Jesus, the Divine Child, Child Jesus and the Holy Child, refers to Jesus Christ from his nativity until age 12. The four canonical gospels, accepted by most Christians today, lack any narration of the years between Jesus' infancy and the Finding in the Temple when he was 12.

In Italy, until the 20th century, before the tradition of letters addressed to Santa Claus spread throughout the country, it was customary in many families to have children write letters addressed to Christ Child, compositions expressing good intentions for the new year and requests for welcome gifts for Christmas Day.

Several historically significant images of the Christ Child have been crowned by the pope, namely the Bambino Gesù di Arenzano and the Santo Bambino of Aracoeli (both in Italy), the Infant Jesus of Prague (Czech Republic), and the Santo Niño de Cebú (Philippines). In the 17th century, French Carmelites promoted veneration of the "Little King of Beaune". In the late 19th century, a devotion to the "Holy Child of Remedy" developed in Madrid, Spain.

==== Befana ====
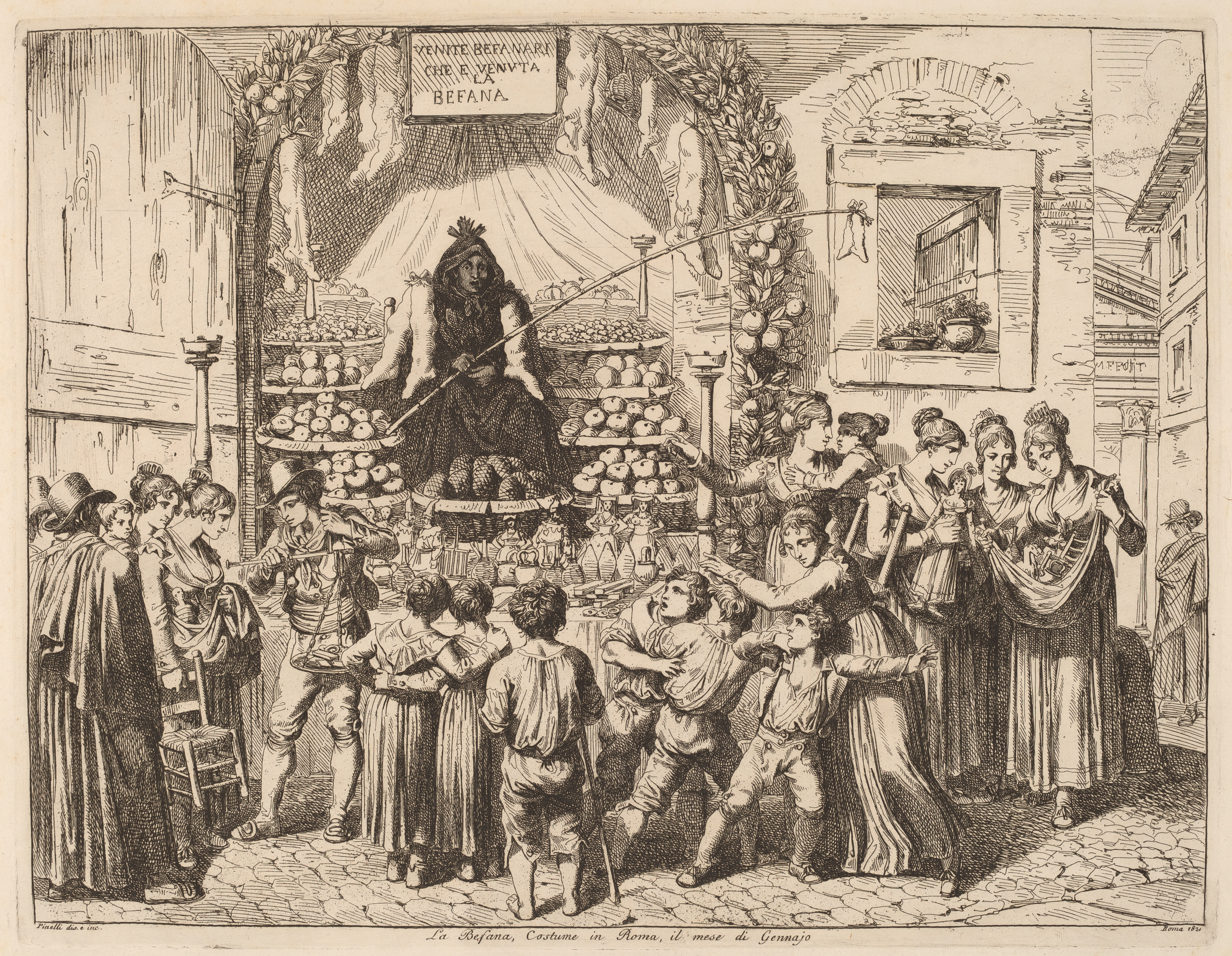
La Befana by Bartolomeo Pinelli (1821)

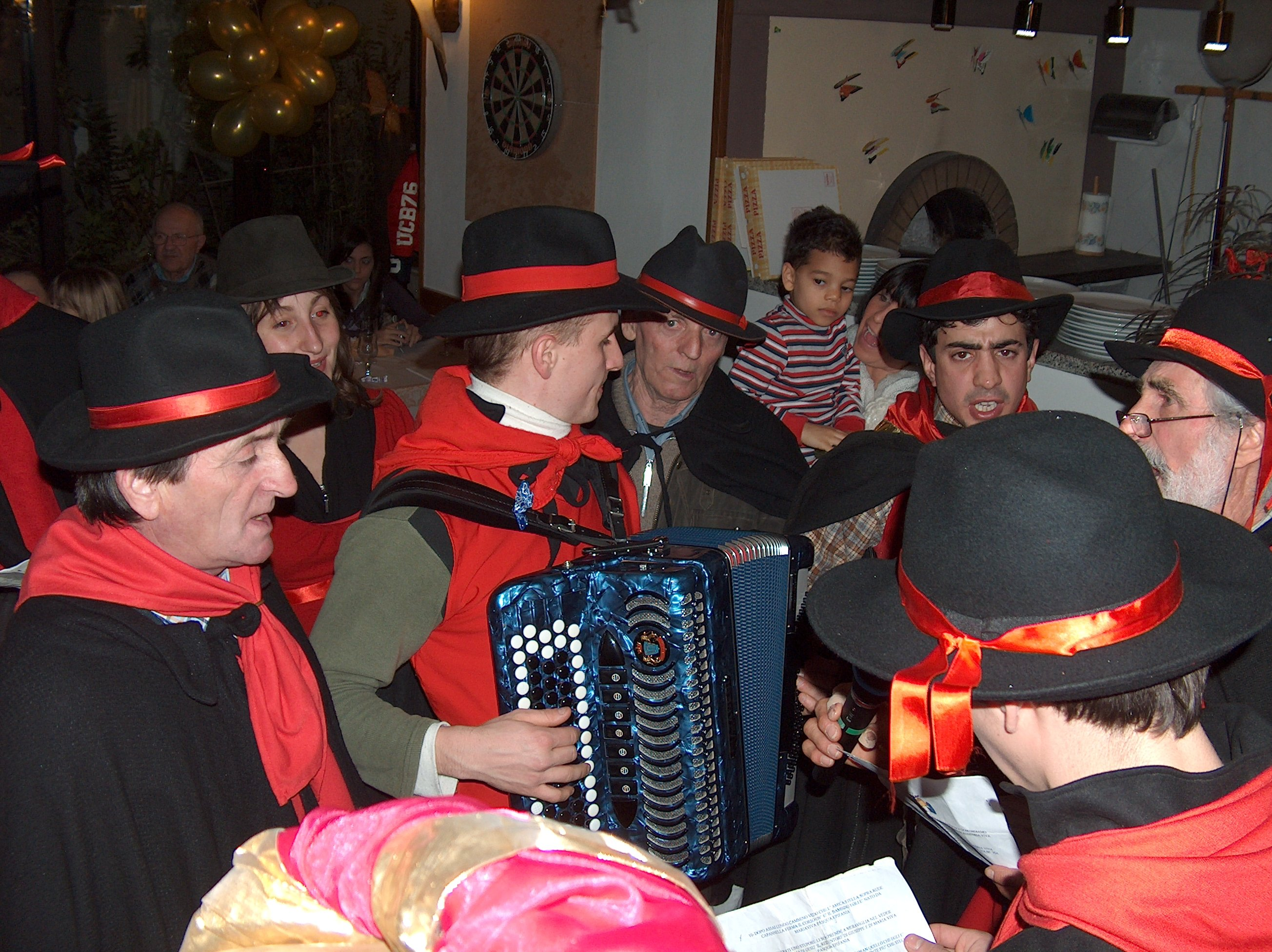
Befana feast in Santa Sofia, Emilia–Romagna

A typical figure of Italian Christmas folklore is the Befana, depicted as an old witch on a broom, who appears as a bearer of gifts on 6 January, the day of the Epiphany. According to tradition, this figure brings gifts (usually sweets inside of a sock) to good children and coal to bad children.

The Befana, whose name is an altered form of the word Epifania, is a figure that can be connected to others that are also found in other cultures, such as the German Frau Berchta and the Russian Babuška.

A famous nursery rhyme is dedicated to the figure of the Befana:

La Befana vien di Notte
con le scarpe tutte rotte
il cappello alla romana
viva viva la Befana
The Befana comes at night
with her shoes all broken
the Roman hat
long live the Befana

— La Befana vien di Notte

In 1938, under fascism, the so-called "Fascist Befana" was introduced during the Christmas holidays, a demonstration for charitable purposes.

=== Strenna ===
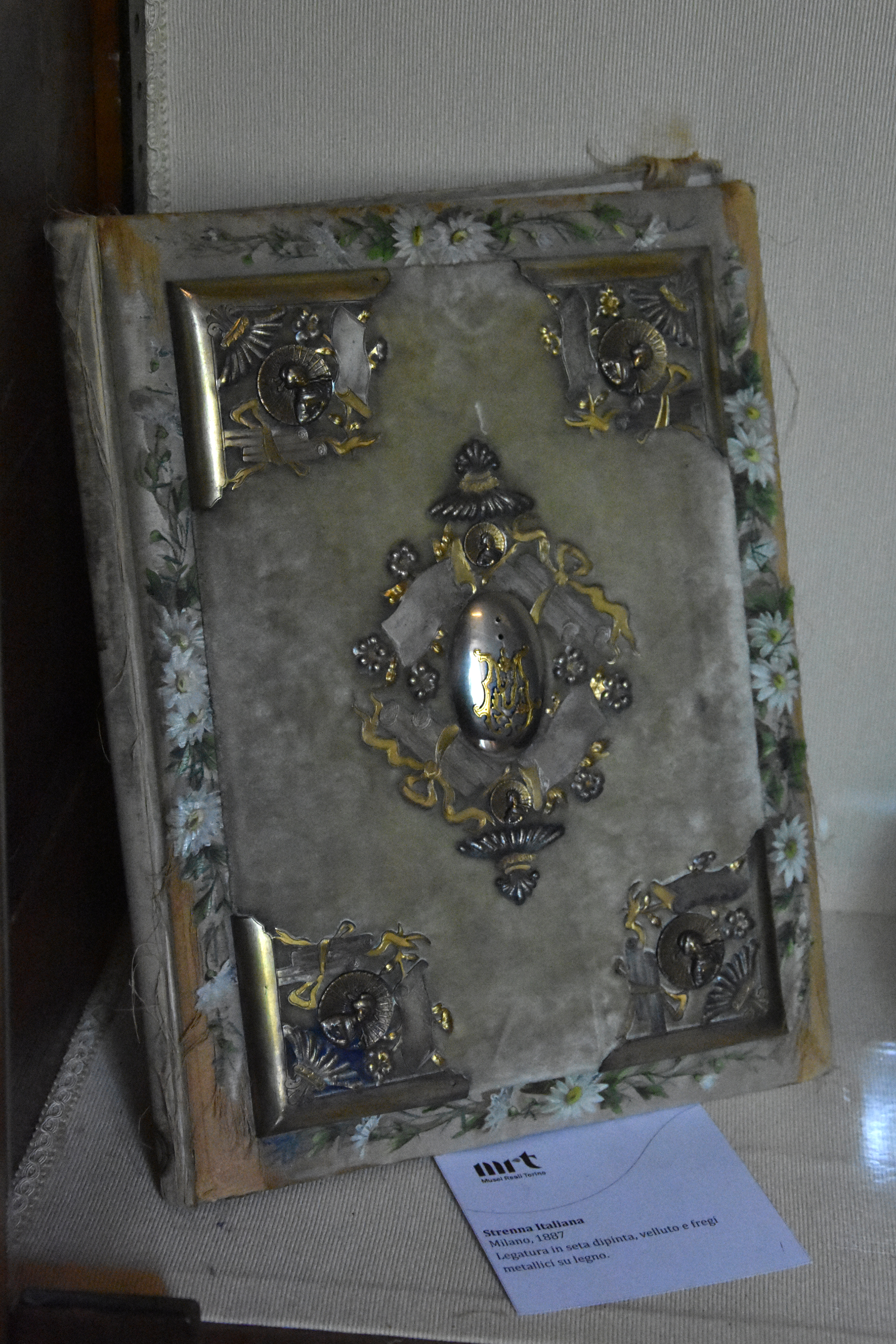
Italian gift produced in Milan in 1887 and preserved in the Royal Library of Turin

Strenna or Strenna di Natale is a gift that is usual to make or receive in Italy at Christmas time. This custom comes from the tradition of ancient Rome which involved the exchange of gifts of good wishes during the Saturnalia, a series of festivities that took place each year between 17 and 23 December, in honor of the god Saturn and preceding the day of the Natalis Solis Invicti. The term derives from the Latin Strena, word probably of Sabine origin, with the meaning 'gift of good luck'.

According to Varro, the use was adopted as early as the first foundation of the city, set up by Titus Tatius who first caught, as good augur for the new year, the twig of a plant (arbor felix) located in the woods sacred to the goddess Strenia; from this derived the term strenae for the gifts of various types, including coins, to be exchanged in the feast of Saturnalia.

In the publishing field, in the 19th century, strenna was also a collection of poems in prose and poetry that was placed for sale in the New Year. This use nowadays has diminished, but not ceased. From this custom come the definitions strenne editoriali or libro strenna. for publications placed on the market during the first week of December, having as main purpose to serve as a traditional gift for the Christmas festivities.

=== Oh bej! Oh bej! ===
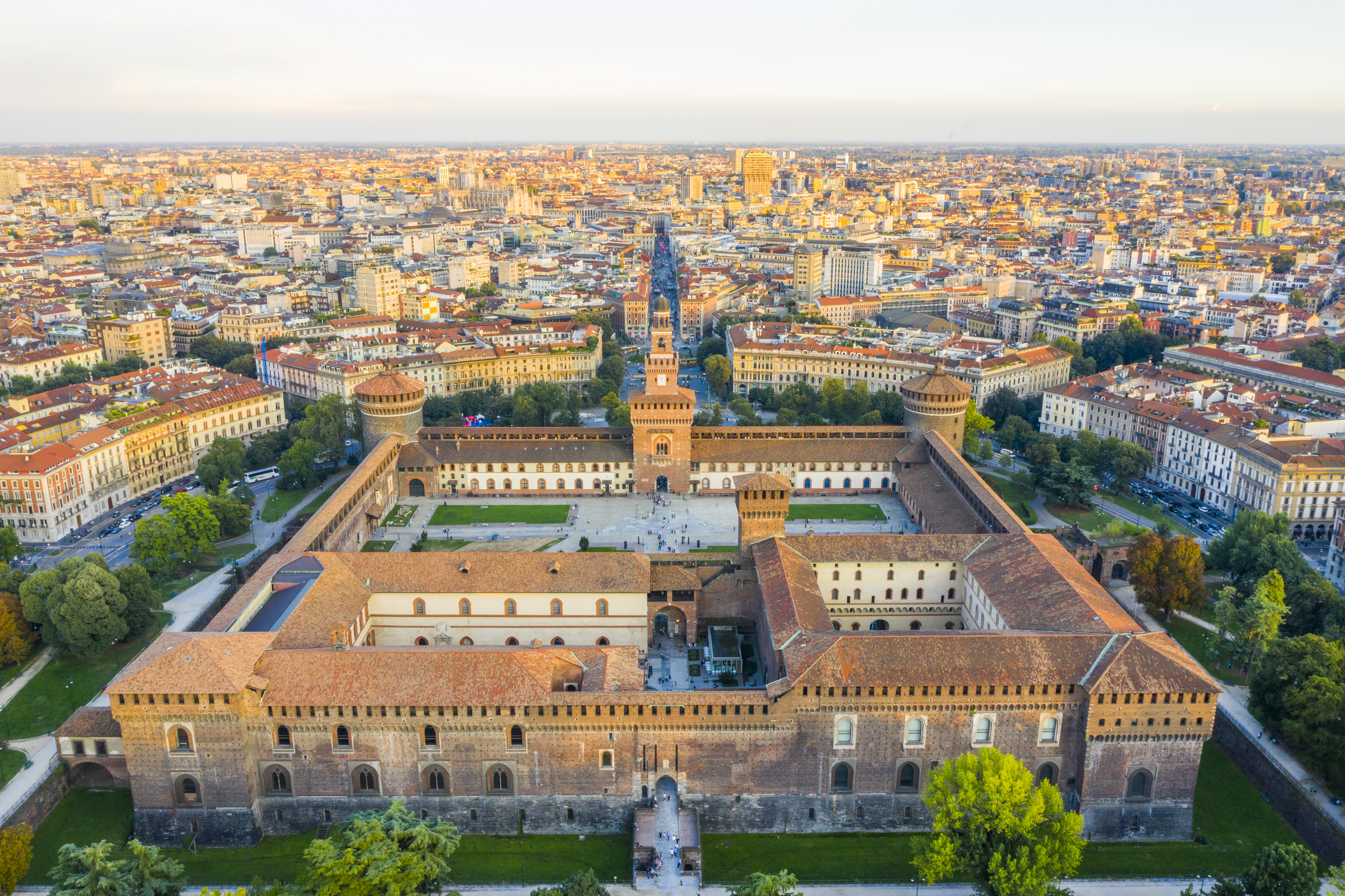
Sforza Castle (Castello Sforzesco) in Milan

Oh bej! Oh bej! (pronounced [u ˈbɛj u ˈbɛj] or [ɔ ˈbɛj ɔ ˈbɛj]; in Milanese: 'oh so nice! oh so nice!') is the most important and traditional Christmas fair in Milan. It is held from 7 December (day of the patron saint of Milan, Ambrose) until the following Sunday. The fair is also informally known as the Fiera di Sant'Ambrogio ('Saint Ambrose Fair').

The Oh bej! Oh bej! fair has been held in different areas of Milan; until 1886, it was located in Piazza Mercanti (in the surroundings of the Duomo); from 1886 to 2006, it was held by the Basilica di Sant'Ambrogio; in 2006, it was relocated again, to the area of the Sforza Castle.

The most typical goods that are sold at Oh bej! Oh bej! are sweets and Christmas or winter delicacies, handcrafts such as Christmas decorations, toys, antiques, souvenirs, bric-a-brac, and more. The fair is usually very crowded; this is partly because, as Saint Ambrose Day is immediately followed by the Immaculate Conception Day (an Italian national holiday), and potentially be followed by a weekend, Milanese usually have several free days in the fair's days.

While celebrations devoted to Ambrose, in Milan, date back to the late 13th century, the actual Oh bej! Oh bej! fair is said to have been established in 1510, on the occasion of Giannetto Castiglione, delegate of Pope Pius IV, visiting Milan on 7 December.

=== Confeugo ===
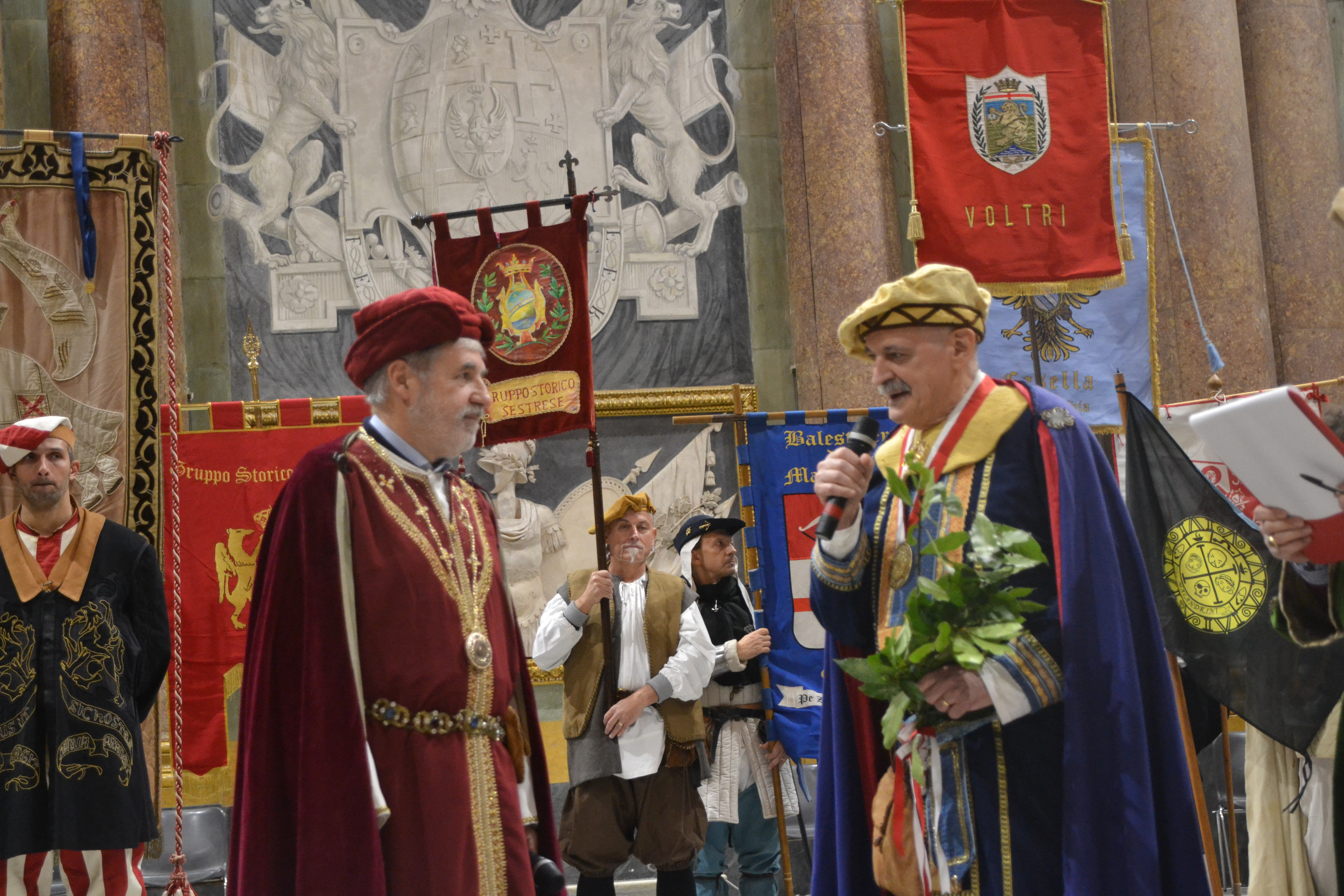
Confeugo in Genoa, 2019

The Confeugo is an ancient cultural event in Liguria, traditionally celebrated on Christmas Eve or a couple of days before Christmas. It is a historical event linked to the Republic of Genoa and is still commemorated today mainly in Genoa and Savona, but also in other Ligurian Municipalities that were once the seat of podesterie and capitaneati.

As some historical sources testify, this tradition was born in Genoa in the early years of the 14th century, although most probably this historical event dates back to older times.

=== Ndocciata ===
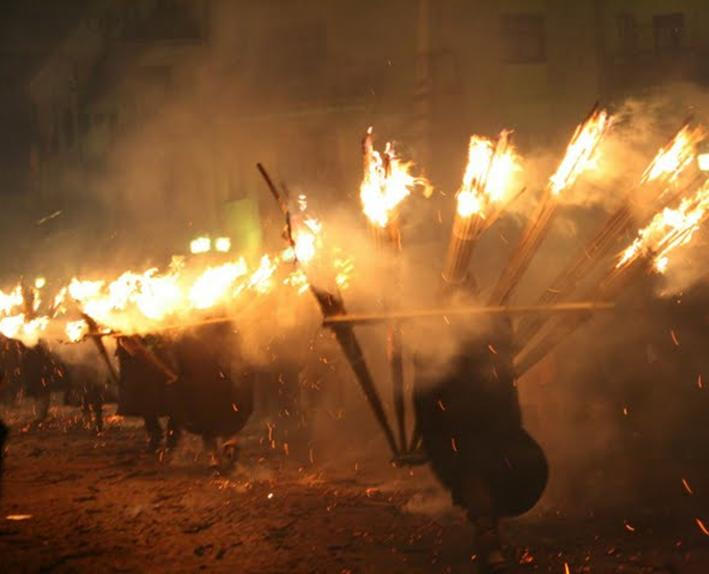
The Ndocciata torchlight parade

Ndocciata is an ancient Christmas festival celebrated in Molise, southern Italy, specifically in the comune (municipality) of Agnone. On the evening of 24 December the "Ndocciata" of Agnone is a parade of a great number of "'ndocce" (torches), structures with a typical fanwise shape, made of silver fir pinewood pallets. They may be only one torch or, more often, with multiple torches up to 20 fires. Four metres high, torches are transported by different carriers dressed in traditional costumes. The big bell of St. Anthony's Church is rung, and groups from the cities' districts (Capammonde and Capabballe, Colle Sente, Guastra, Onofrio, San Quirico) consisting of hundreds of carriers of all ages, light their torches to set off along the main streets which thus becomes what locals call a "river of fire". There is a choral participation and bagpipers along the roads of the village, and groups compete in order to have the biggest and the most beautiful torch. The procession ends with a bonfire called "Bonfire of Brotherhood" at Plebiscite Square where a nativity scene is displayed.

=== Badalisc ===
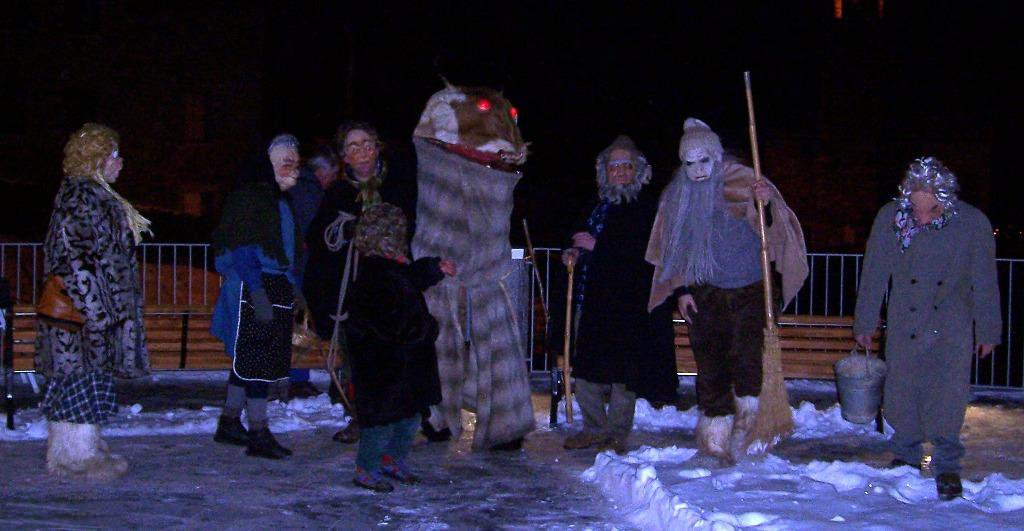
The capture of the Badalisc

The Badalisc (also Badalisk) is a mythical creature of the Val Camonica, Italy, in the southern central Alps. The Badalisc is represented today as a creature with a big head covered with a goat skin, two small horns, a huge mouth and glowing eyes. According to legend the Badalisc lives in the woods around the village of Andrista (commune of Cevo) and is supposed to annoy the community. Each year it is captured during the period of Epiphany (5 and 6 January) and led on a rope into the village by musicians and masked characters, including il giovane ('the young man'), il vecchio ('the old man'), la vecchia ('the old woman') and la signorina ('the young woman'), who is "bait" for the animal's lust. There are also some old witches, who beat drums, and bearded shepherds, and a hunchback (un torvo gobetto) who has a "rustic duel" with the animal. Traditionally only men take part, although some are dressed as women. In medieval times women were prohibited from participating in the exhibition, or even to see or hear the Badalisc's Speech; if they did so they would be denied Holy Communion the following day.

In the village square (formerly in a stable) the Badalisc's speech (la 'ntifunada) is read, in which the mythological animal gossips about the community. The Badalisc itself is a dumb creature, so the speech, nowadays written in rhyme, is read by an "interpreter". Once improvised, now written in advance, the speech reveals all the supposed sins and scheming of the community. During the speech the hunchback bangs his stick rhythmically at intervals. The speech is followed by singing, dancing and feasting. In the evening the community eats the "Badalisc polenta" (a commercial version of this traditional food was launched in 2010). Until recently, village children would beg from house to house during the Badalisc celebrations for cornmeal to make the polenta; a Badalisc salami was also specially made for them. The badalisc has a place of honour at the feasts.

== Tourism ==
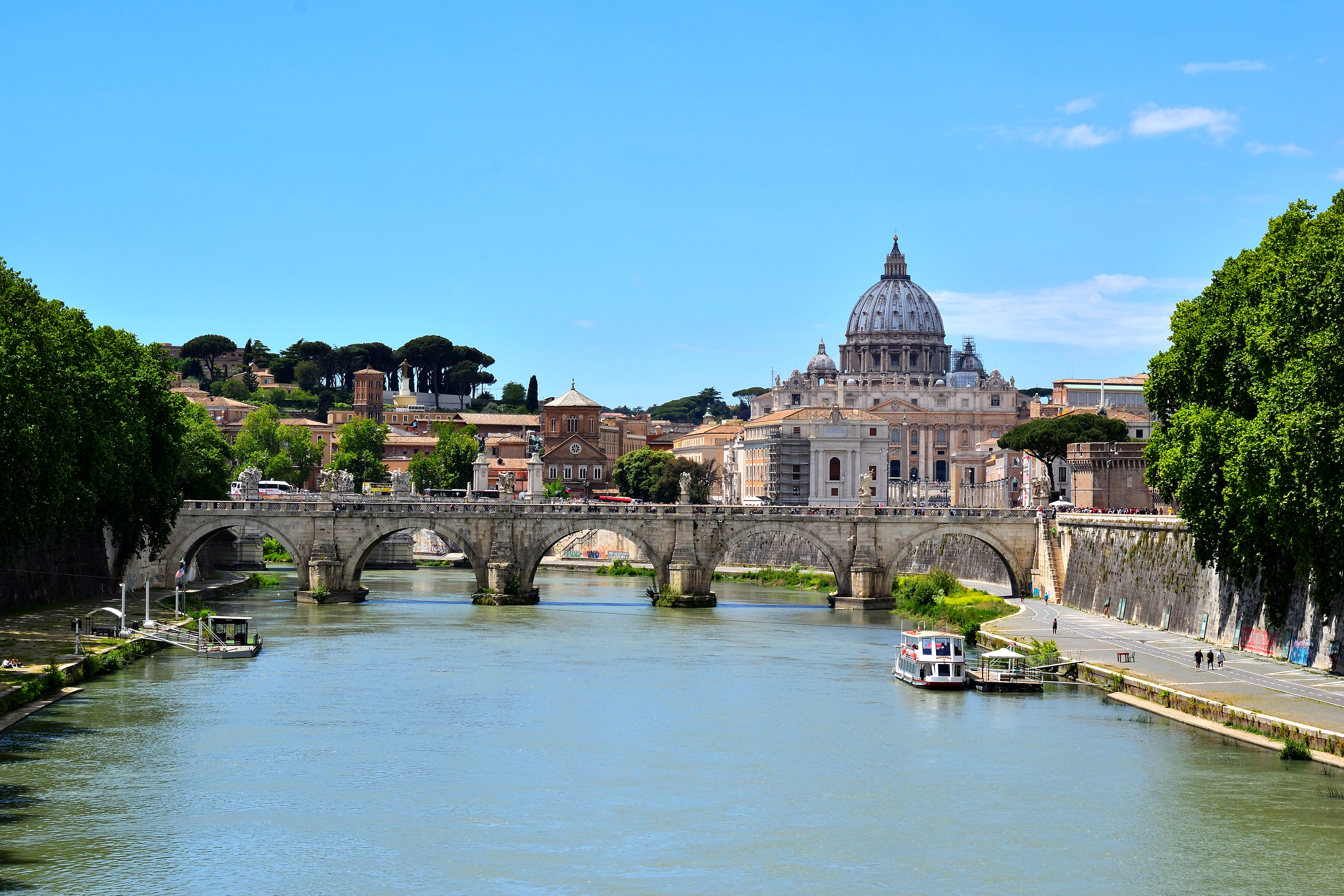
St. Peter's Basilica, viewed from the Tiber, the Vatican Hill in the back and Castel Sant'Angelo to the right, Rome (both the basilica and the hill are part of the sovereign state of Vatican City, the Holy See of the Catholic Church).

The peaks of tourist flows in Italy are recorded in winter, due to the Christmas and New Year's Day holidays, in spring, due to the Easter holidays, and in summer, due to the favourable climate.

Italy is among the countries most visited in the world by tourists during the Christmas holidays. The attraction factors are the not too harsh climate, the cultural offer of the cities including museums, exhibitions and party initiatives, the rich gastronomy as well as the more affordable prices compared to other countries.

Italy is the second European country most visited by European tourists during the Christmas holidays behind Spain and ahead of Portugal, France and the United Kingdom. The Italian cities most visited by international tourists during the Christmas holidays are, in order, Milan, Rome, Naples, Catania, Palermo and Cagliari. Milan, in particular, is the favourite destination by European tourists for Germans, British and Portuguese tourists and the second for French, Spaniards and Dutch tourists.

== Gastronomy ==
=== Tortellini ===
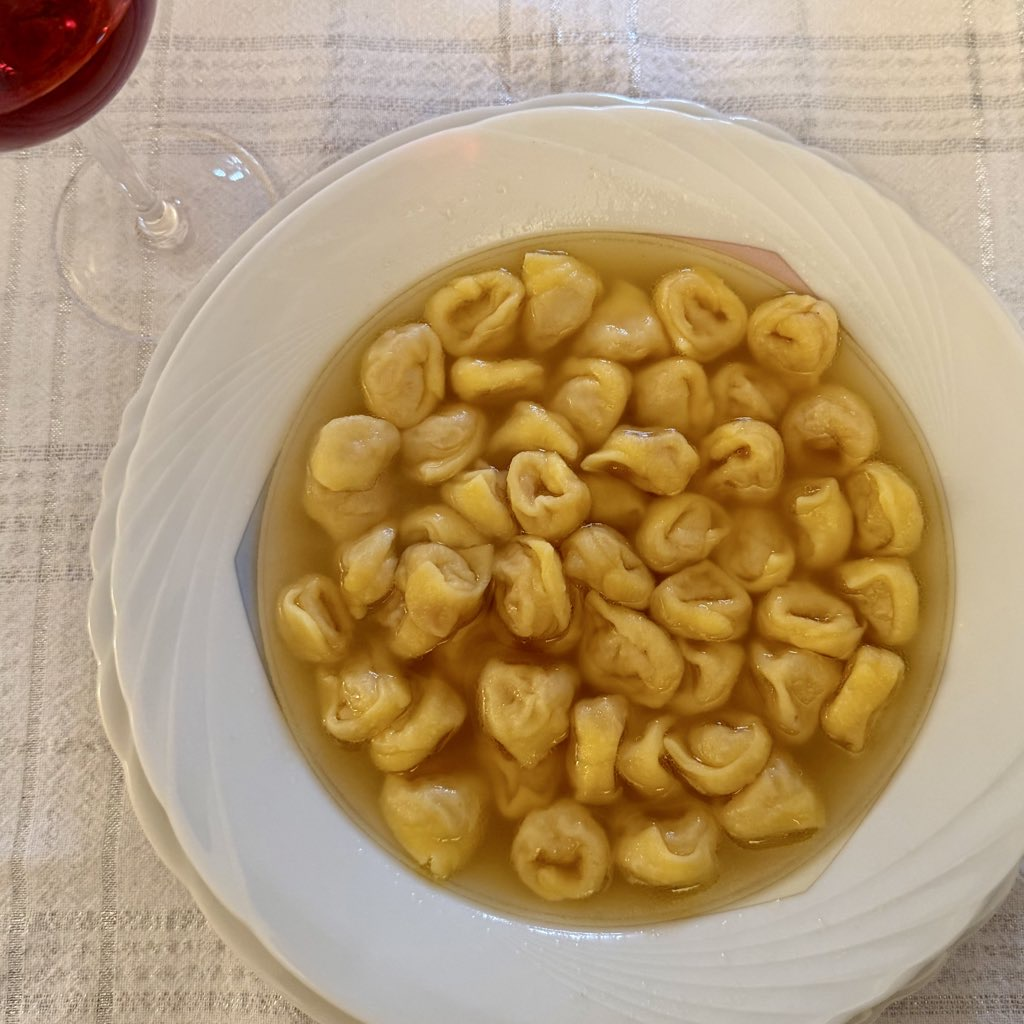
Tortellini

Tortellini is a type of stuffed pasta typical of the Italian cities of Bologna and Modena, in the Emilia-Romagna region. Traditionally it is stuffed with a mix of meat (pork loin, prosciutto, mortadella), Parmesan cheese, egg, and nutmeg and served in capon broth (in brodo di cappone). The etymology of tortellini is the diminutive form of tortello, itself a diminutive of torta (lit. 'cake' or 'pie').

The recipe for a dish called tortelletti appears in 1570 from Bartolomeo Scappi. Vincenzo Tanara's writings in the mid-17th century may be responsible for the pasta's renaming to tortellini. In the 1800s, legends sprang up to explain the recipe's origins, offering a compromise. Castelfranco Emilia, located between Bologna and Modena, is featured in one legend, in which Venus stays at an inn. Overcome by her beauty, the innkeeper spies on her through a keyhole, through which he can only see her navel. He is inspired to create a pasta in this shape. This legend would be at the origin of the term ombelico di Venere (lit. 'Venus' navel'), occasionally used to describe tortellini.

Tortellini are especially associated with Christmas and other winter holidays, traditionally served as a festive first course during family celebrations.

=== Agnolini ===
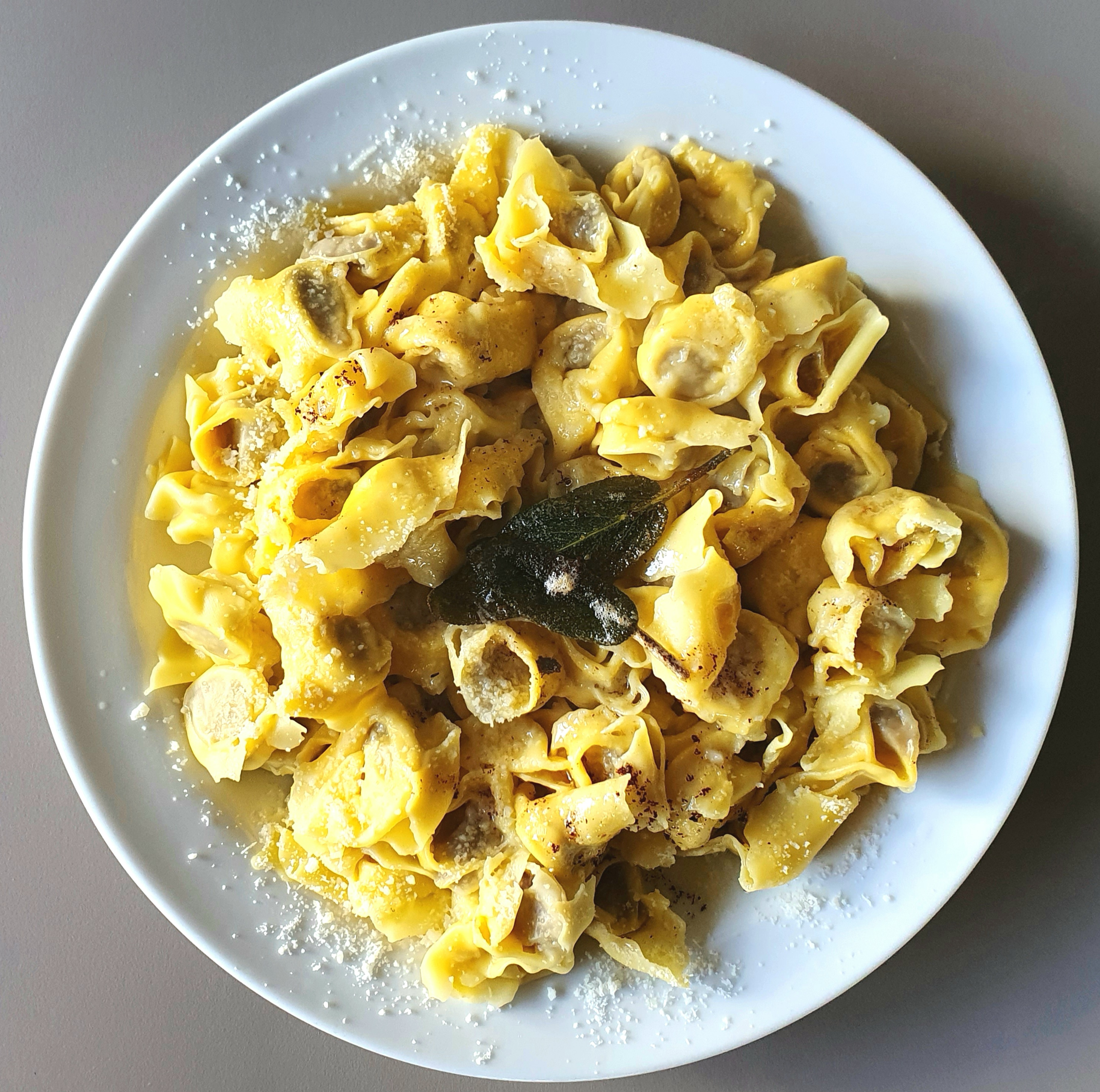
Agnolini

Agnolini is a type of egg-based stuffed pasta originating from the province of Mantua (in the Mantuan dialect it is commonly called "agnulìn" or "agnulì"), oftentimes eaten in soup or broth. Agnolini's recipe was first published in L'arte di ben cucinare (1662) by Bartolomeo Stefani, a cook at the court of the Gonzaga family.

Agnolini is the main ingredient of soups of the Mantuan cuisine, usually consumed during holidays and important occasions. According to Mantuan tradition, during Christmas Eve chicken broth with the agnolini alongside other traditional Mantuan dishes such as the agnolini's soup sorbir d'agnoli, with abundant addition of Parmesan cheese are consumed. Sorbir, to which red wine is added, generally Lambrusco, represents the opening to the Christmas lunch.

=== Cappelletti ===
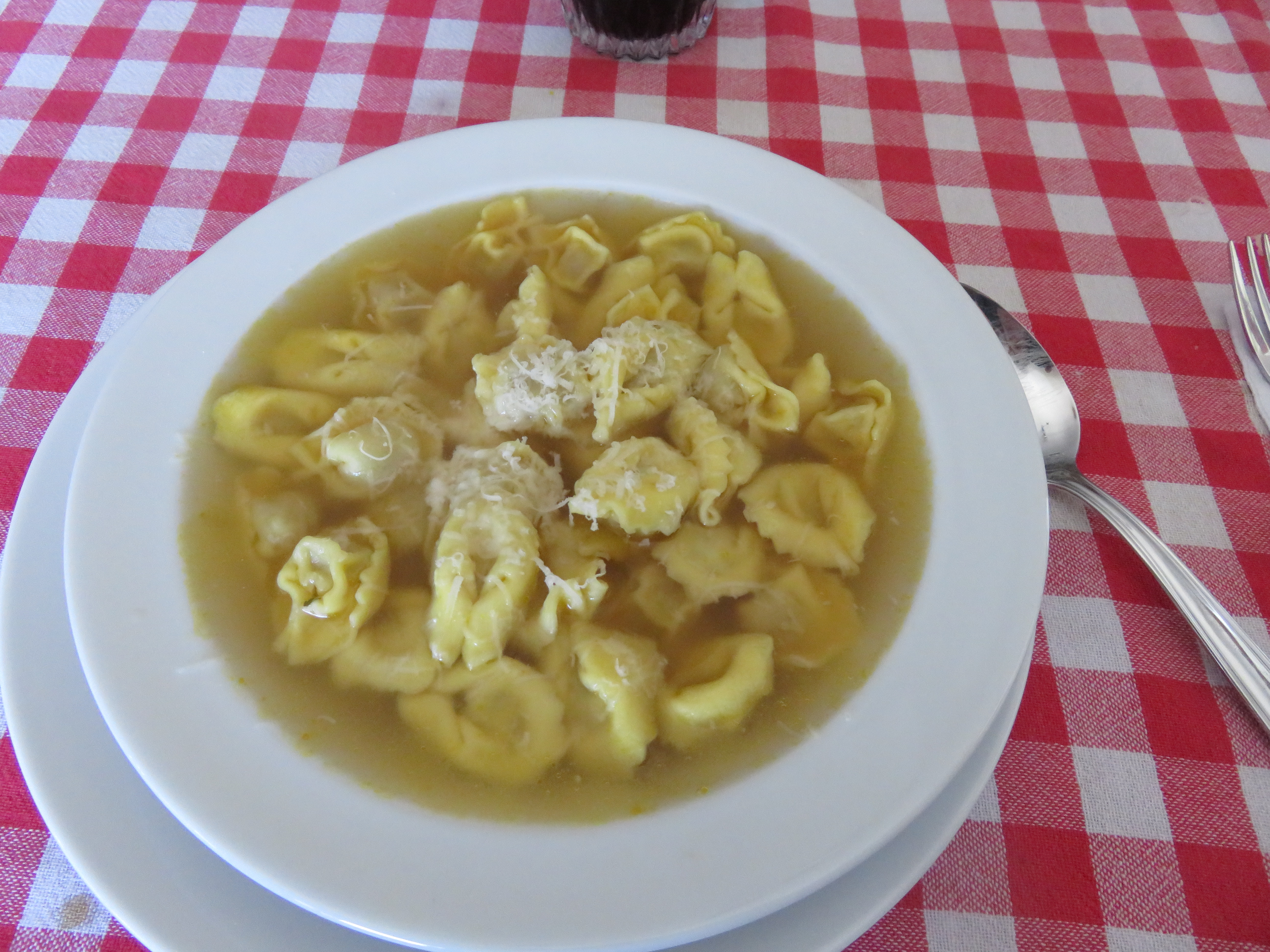
Cappelletti

Cappelletti (Italian: [kappelˈletti]) are ring-shaped Italian stuffed pasta so called for the characteristic shape that resembles a hat (cappello in Italian). Compared to tortellini, they have a different shape, larger size, thicker dough and different filling. The origins of the recipe, very widespread on a territorial basis, are ancient, traditionally and historically linked to Emilia-Romagna and Marche. From these areas it then spread over the centuries, becoming a typical dish in various cities. Some recent sources specifically indicate the area in the Cesena-Ferrara-Reggio Emilia triangle as the place of origin; others report the Marche as a land where cappelletti are of ancient tradition.

Cappelletti are also traditional in Reggio Emilia and Parma, especially during the Christmas holidays. The Reggiano type is shaped like a small hat or similar to a ring (different from the anolini or cappelletti from Parma, with a similar filling). Pellegrino Artusi, a native of Forlimpopoli, in his Science in the kitchen and the art of eating well, reports recipe no. 7: Romagna-style cappelletti, with ricotta-based filling (or ricotta and raviggiolo), capon breast or pork loin, to be cooked in capon broth. In Umbria, cappelletti in capon broth are also considered the typical dish on New Year's Day. Unlike Romagna, where the filling is made with cheeses, the Umbrian recipe also includes mixed meat such as veal, turkey or chicken and pork loin.

=== Agnolotti pavesi ===
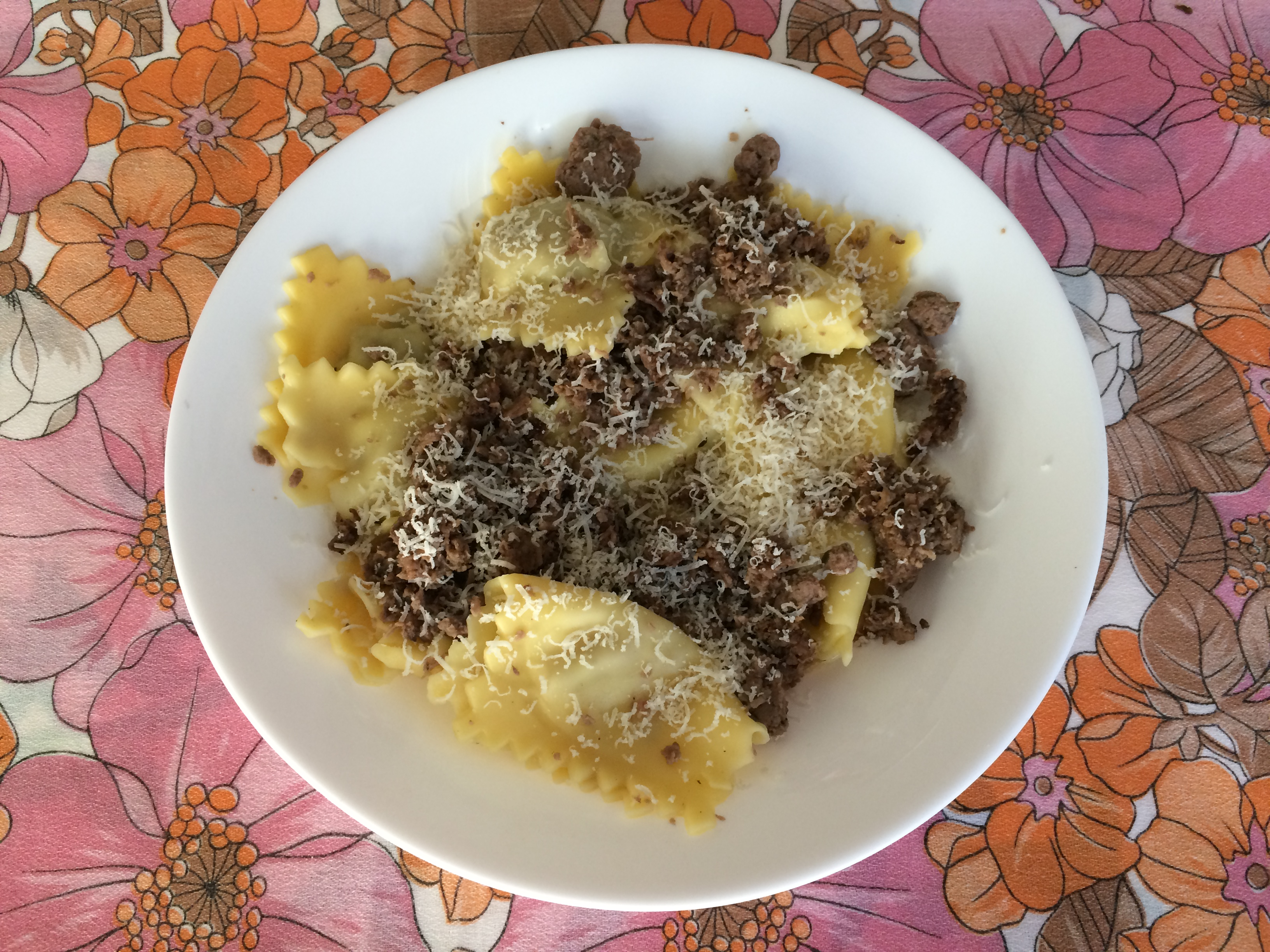
A plate of dry agnolotti pavesi, with a Pavese stew-based sauce

Agnolotti pavesi is a type of egg-based stuffed pasta of the Lombard cuisine served hot or warm, typical of the Oltrepò Pavese, an area of the province of Pavia, in the Italian region of Lombardy. Agnolotti pavesi can be served dry, with a sauce based on Pavese stew, or in goose broth.

The filling of the agnolotti pavesi is based on Pavese stew. The recipe for this stuffed egg-based pasta is characterized by influences from Piedmontese and Piacentino cuisine, characteristics of areas that border the Oltrepò Pavese. The shape of the pasta was based on the Piedmontese agnolotti, and the filling of Pavese stew is based on stracotto alla piacentina, which is the filling for Piacentino anolini. Piedmontese agnolotti, in particular, differ from the agnolotti pavesi due to the filling, which is instead based on roast meat. Agnolotti pavesi is a typical dish of the Christmas tradition, and are consumed during celebrations and important occasions.

=== Capon ===
In northern Italy, capon is eaten as a meat dish served on Christmas Day. This tradition dates back to the Middle Ages, when capon broth was consumed during the Christmas holidays, which were also linked to the celebrations of the winter solstice. In particular, in Milan, around Christmas, four capons were raised, a deep-rooted tradition also reported in Alessandro Manzoni's The Betrothed, generally ranked among the masterpieces of world literature. The four capons for the Christmas holidays in Milan were eaten, respectively, on the feast of St. Ambrose (patron saint of Milan), on Christmas, on New Year's Eve and on the Epiphany.

The typical Christmas recipe for this dish is stuffed capon. For the filling, minced veal or sausage, stale bread and milk are used, all flavored with pepper, nutmeg, rosemary, garlic, sage and parsley. Traditionally, capon is then served at the table garnished with pomegranate seeds, which is one of the oldest symbols linked to fertility and well-being.

=== Abbacchio ===
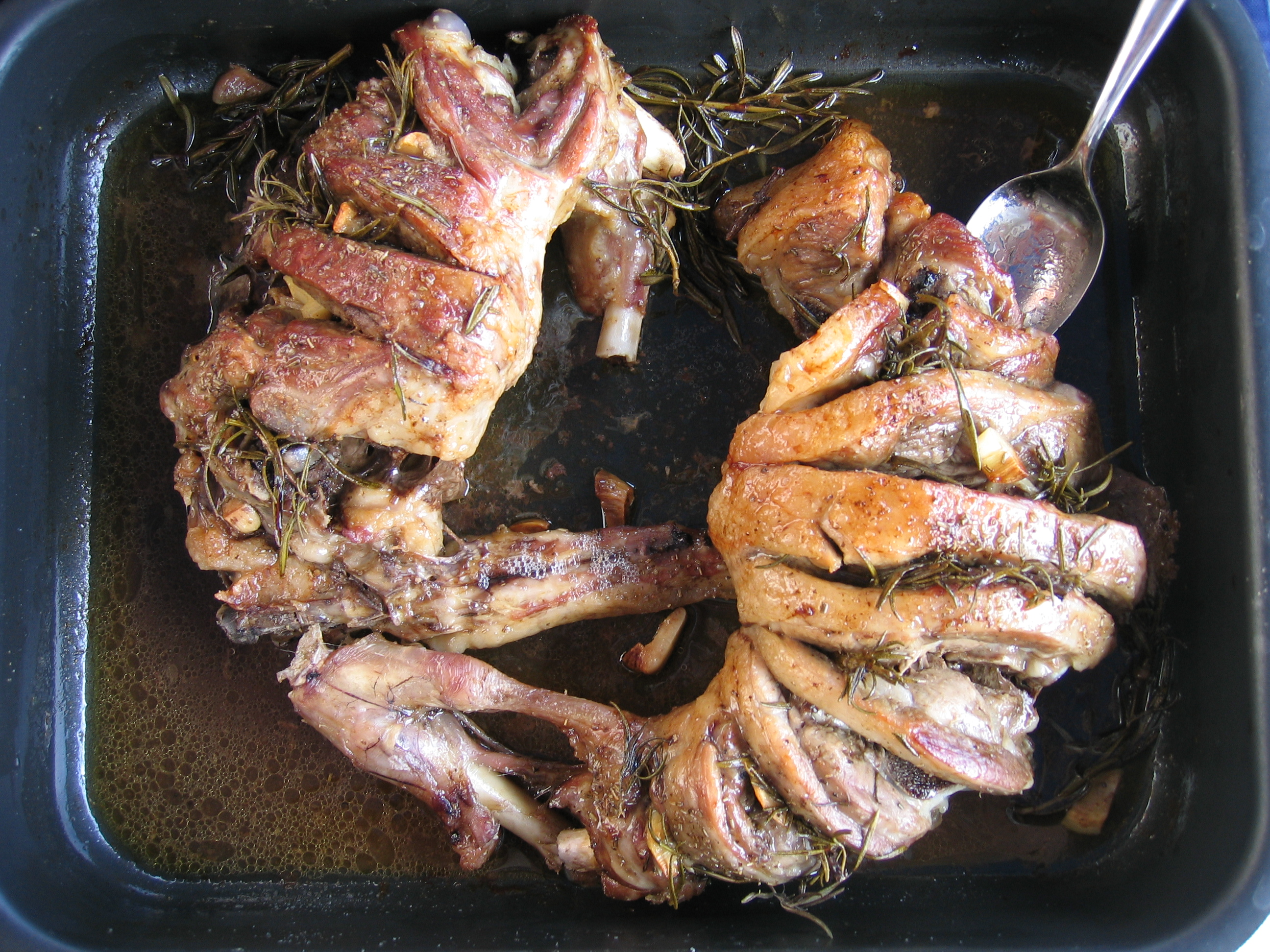
Abbacchio, an Italian preparation of lamb

Abbacchio is an Italian preparation of lamb typical of the Roman cuisine. In central Italy, the consumption of abbacchio is common as a Christmas dish, particularly in Rome. In Rome abbacchio is also an Easter food.

In Romanesco dialect, the offspring of the sheep who is still suckling or recently weaned is called "abbacchio", while the offspring of the sheep almost a year old who has already been shorn twice is called "agnello" (lit. 'lamb'). This distinction exists only in the Romanesco dialect. Abbacchio is a product protected by the European Union with the PGI mark.

The classic Christmas recipe for this dish involves cooking the lamb in a pan, adding chopped sage and garlic and then wine mixed with vinegar. Other recipes include lamb cooked in the oven, fried or grilled.

=== Capitone ===
In southern Italy, especially in Naples, at Christmas Eve dinner, the female eel, which is called "capitone" (from the Latin caput, meaning 'head') is eaten. The female eel is characterized by its head size, which is larger than that of the male eel. It can be found in both freshwater and saltwater, since the eel usually travels up rivers from the sea. The tradition of eating female eel during the Christmas holiday season dates back to ancient times.

In fact, due to its shape, the eel recalls a serpent, a biblical symbol of Evil, and consuming it in a religious festival corresponds to a symbolic act of good omen, which links the birth of Christ with the elimination of Evil. According to tradition, the eel to be consumed on Christmas Eve must be purchased alive the previous day, a period in which fishmongers put live female eels in large tanks. In this way, the eel maintains its freshness. After the eel is killed, it is cut into pieces, rubbed with lemon juice and salt, and left to sit for a few hours. It is now ready to cook. Here, the most common preparation is frying, although some families cook the eel slowly in a tomato sauce, often flavoured with garlic and oregano.

=== Panettone ===
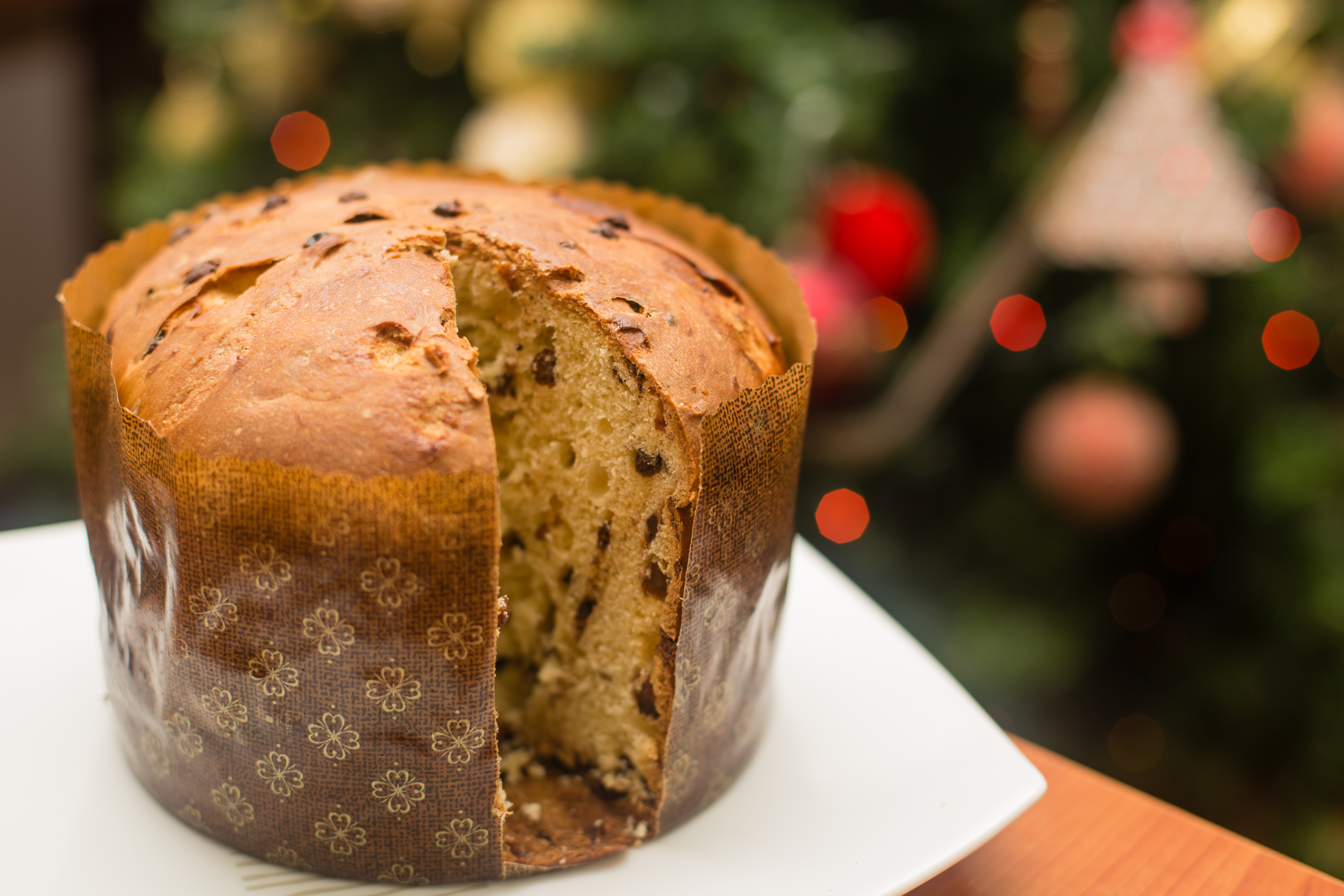
Panettone

Panettone is an Italian type of sweet bread and fruitcake, originally from Milan, usually prepared and enjoyed for Christmas and New Year in Western, Southern, and Southeastern Europe, as well as in South America, Eritrea, Australia, the United States and Canada. The oldest and most certain attestation of the panettone is found in a register of expenses of the Borromeo college of Pavia in 1599.

The origins of this dessert probably date back to the 12th century. The name panettone perhaps derives from pan del Ton, referring to one of the legends about the origins of this dessert, which was allegedly created by a scullery boy named Toni in the service of Duke Ludovico. This Christmas cake was particularly appreciated by the writer Alessandro Manzoni and by the composer Giuseppe Verdi.

Efforts are underway to obtain protected designation of origin and denominazione di origine controllata status for this product, but these have not yet been successful. Former Italian Agriculture Minister Paolo De Castro was known to be looking at ways to protect genuine Italian cakes from growing competition in South America, and exploring whether action could be taken at the World Trade Organization.

=== Pandoro ===
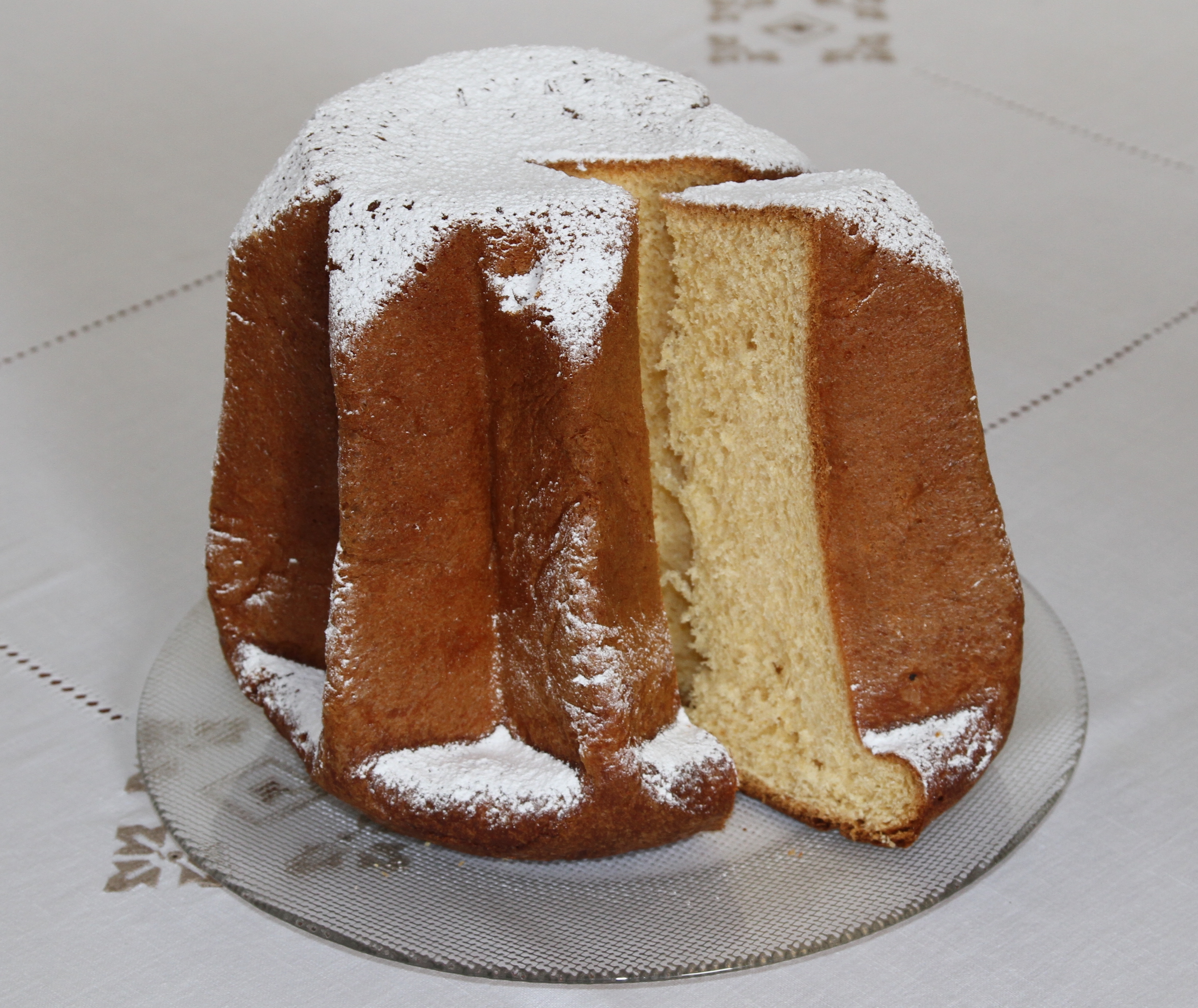
Pandoro

Another typical Italian Christmas cake spread throughout the territory is pandoro, a sweet originally from Verona, created in 1884 by Domenico Melegatti. The name of this cake derives from pan de oro, in memory of a conical-shaped cake, which at the time of the Republic of Venice was covered with pure gold leaves. Pandoro is today the most consumed Italian Christmas dessert together with panettone.

His recipe was the result of a reworking of the levà, a dessert with granulated sugar and almonds originally from Verona, to which Domenico Melegatti removed the covering and added butter and eggs to the dough. The dessert was so successful that several local imitators attempted to recreate it; the Veronese entrepreneur put a thousand lire up for grabs (which at the time corresponded to a small fortune) to anyone who managed to match his recipe. Despite this, no one managed to obtain the prize. The first citation of a dessert clearly identified as pandoro dates to the 18th century.

=== Torrone ===
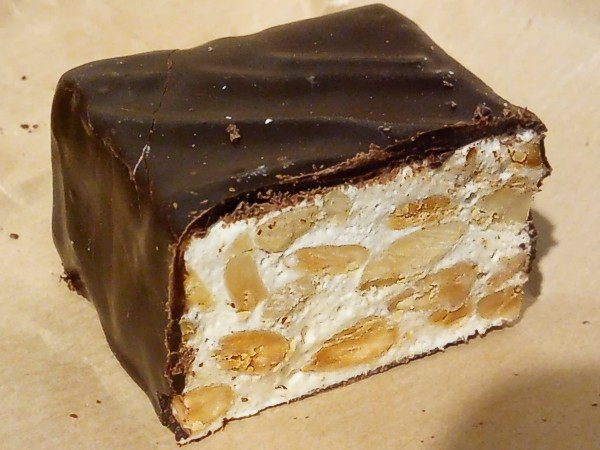
Camerino torrone

Originally from northern Italy, but widespread throughout the country, is torrone. According to tradition, the nougat originated from a dessert served in Cremona, Lombardy, on 25 October 1441 on the occasion of the wedding between Francesco Sforza and Bianca Maria Visconti. Traditional versions from Cremona range widely in texture (morbido, soft and chewy, to duro, hard and brittle) and in flavor (with various citrus flavorings, vanilla, etc., added to the nougat) and may contain whole hazelnuts, almonds and pistachios or only have nut meal added to the nougat. Some commercial versions are dipped in chocolate. The popular recipes have varied with time and differ from one region to the next. Torrone di Benevento from Benevento, Campania, sometimes goes by the historic name Cupedia, which signifies the crumbly version made with hazelnuts. The softer version is made with almonds. Torrone di Benevento is considered to be the oldest of its type since it predates Roman times and was widely known in the territories of Samnium. Although originally resembling sticky paste, it now differs only marginally from the varieties of torrone di Cremona. Abruzzo, Sicily and Sardinia also have local versions that may be slightly distinct from the two main denominations from Lombardy and Campania.

- Torrone di mandorle (usually eaten around Christmas): blocks of chopped almonds in a brittle mass of honey and sugar.
- Torrone di Bagnara Calabra is a well-known torrone given the designation IGP. The recipe, which dates from at least 1700, includes orange blossom honey (from Calabria), almonds (from Sicily), egg whites, sugar, cocoa, and essential oil. There are two variations. "Martiniana" is dusted in confectioners sugar; "Torrefatto" is dusted in cocoa powder.

=== Struffoli ===
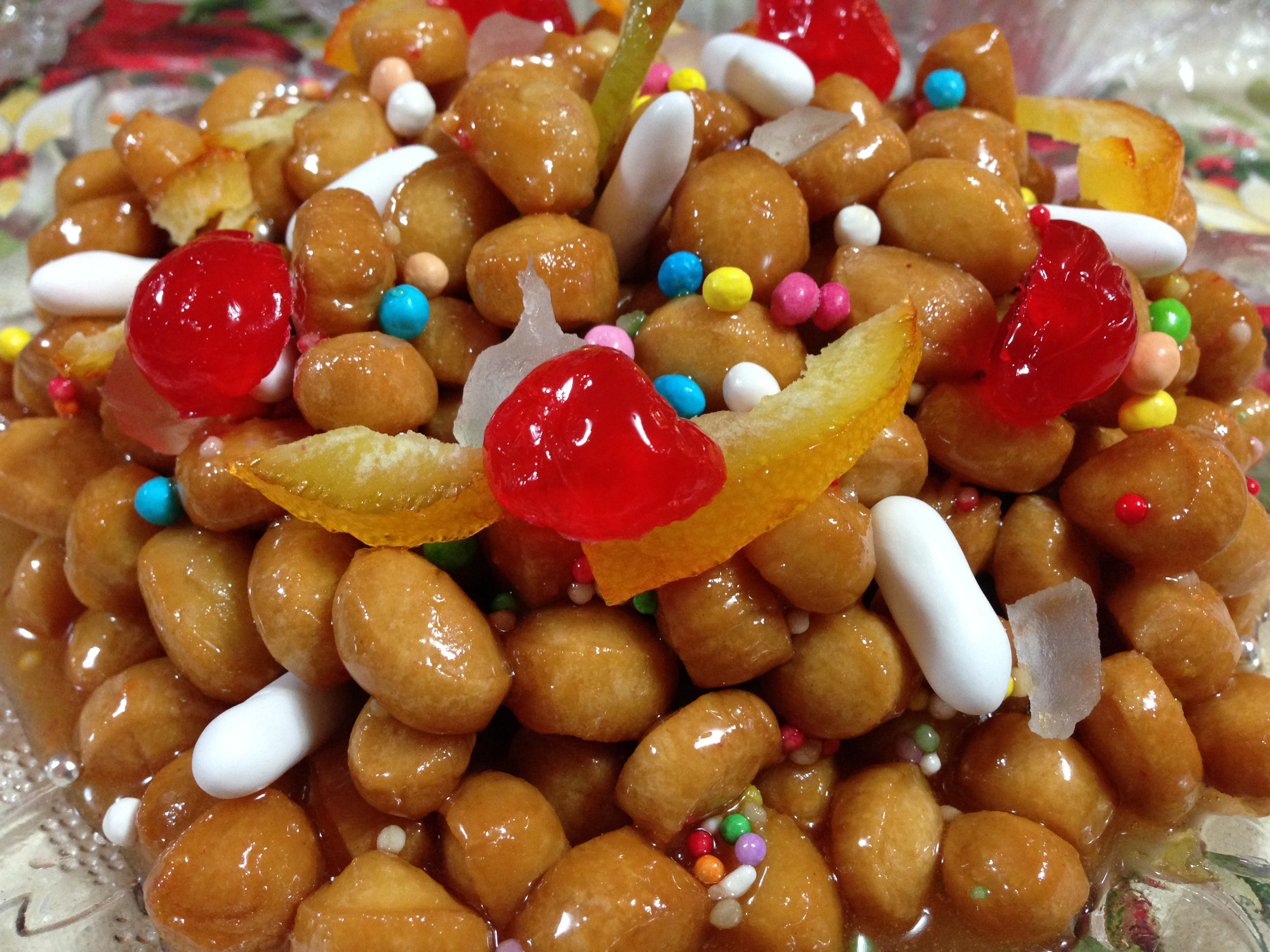
Struffoli

From southern Italy, especially Naples, but widespread throughout, are struffoli, a type of deep-fried dough. Known as early as the 17th century, the name may derive from the Greek strongoulos, which means 'round'. A similar dish is described by Archestratus, a Greek poet from Gela, Sicily. It was called enkris (Greek: ἐγκρίς)—a dough-ball fried in olive oil, which he details in his Gastronomy; a work now lost, but partially preserved in the Deipnosophistae of Athenaeus, which mentions enkris 13 times, in various inflected forms.

=== Panforte ===
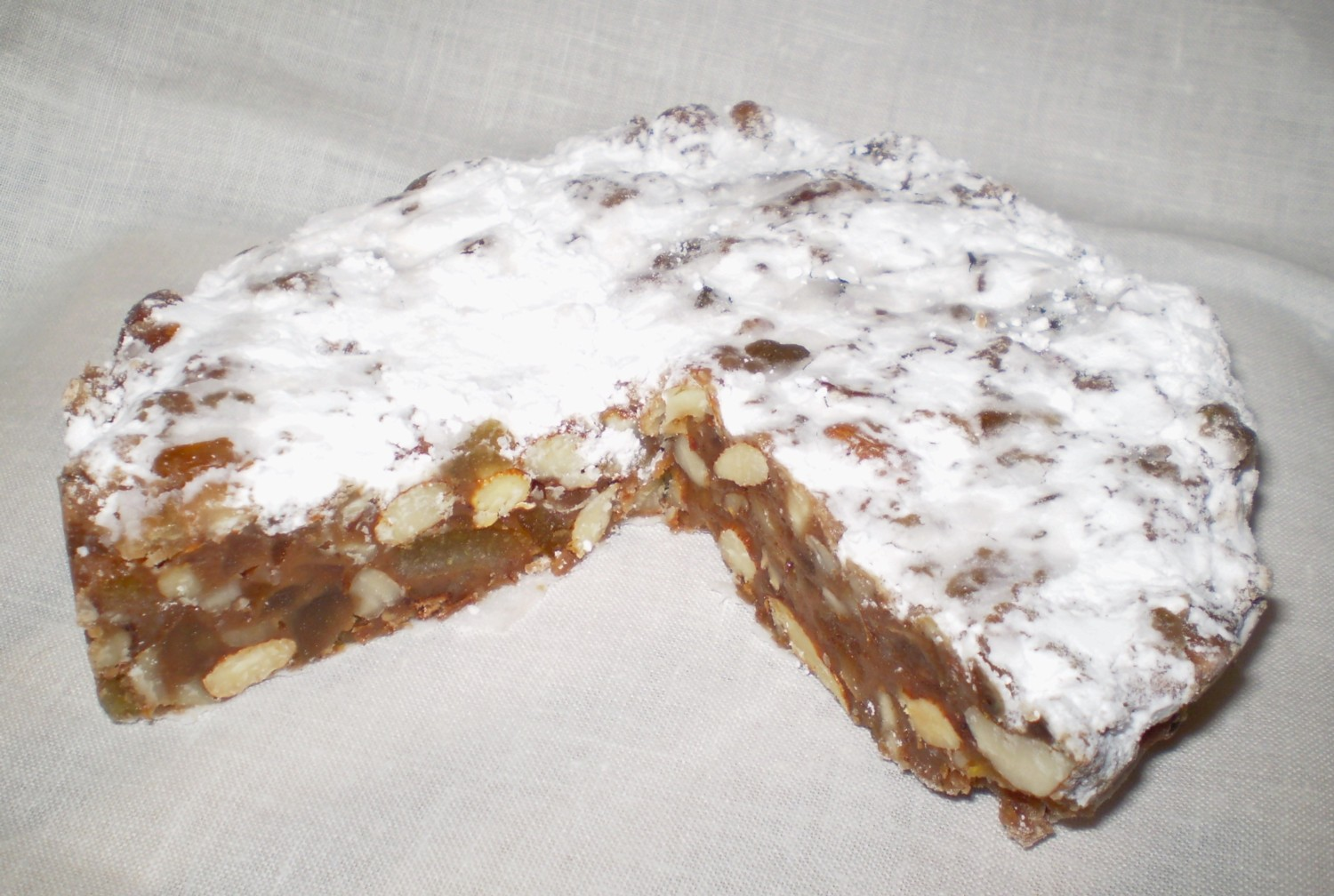
Panforte

Panforte is a traditional chewy Italian dessert containing fruits and nuts. It is similar to a florentine but much thicker, or a somewhat like a lebkuchen. Known throughout Italy, it is a Christmas tradition associated most especially with the province of Siena. Panforte dates back at least to the 13th century, in the Italian region of Tuscany. Documents from 1205, conserved in the State Archive of Siena, attest that bread flavored with pepper and honey (panes melati et pepati) was paid to the local monks and nuns of the monastery of Montecellesi (modern Monte Celso, near Fontebecci) as a tax or tithe which was due on 7 February that year.

Literally, panforte means 'strong bread', derived from the Latin fortis, which refers to the spicy flavour. Originally the Sienese called it "panpepato" ('peppered bread'), due to the strong pepper used. The original dessert was composed of wheat flour, honey, spices, dried figs, jam, pine nuts and was flavored with pepper.

Currently there are many shops in Italy that produce panforte, each recipe being their own guarded interpretation of the original confection and packaged in distinctive wrapping. Usually a small wedge is served with coffee or a dessert wine after a meal, although some enjoy it with their coffee at breakfast.

In Siena—which is regarded by many, if not most inhabitants of that city, as the panforte capital of Italy—it is sometimes said that panforte should properly contain 17 different ingredients, 17 being the number of Contrade within the city walls.

=== Bisciola ===
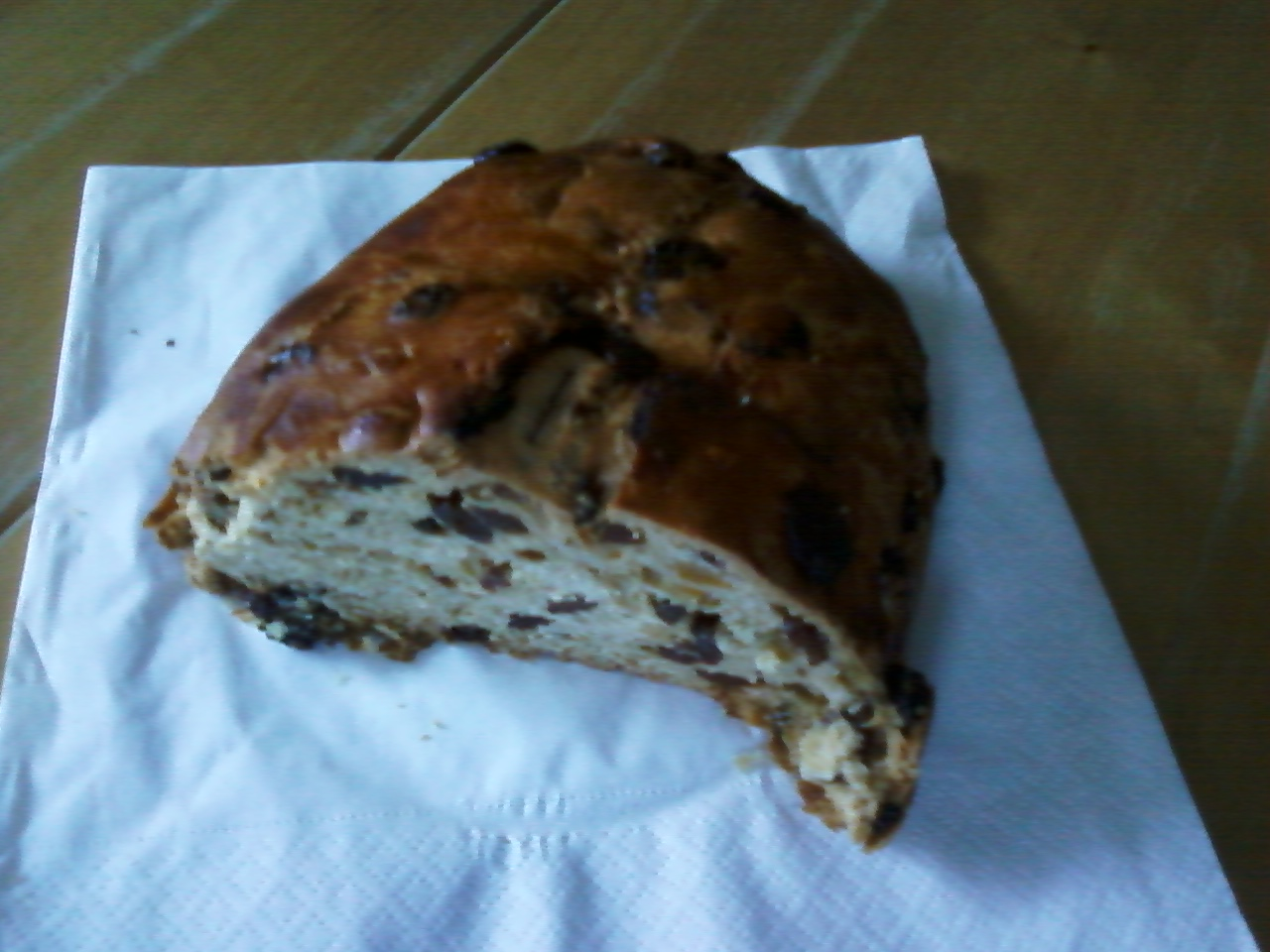
Bisciola

Bisciola is an artisanal Italian sweet leavened bread originating from the Valtellina valley of Lombardy. It is typically prepared for Christmas during which time it is an essential component of Christmas festivities. It is also known as panettone valtellinese, besciola, and pan di fich, the latter a name in the local dialect literally translating as fig bread.

The term bisciola probably derives from the Latin buccella (lit. 'morsel'). A legend states that in 1797, Napoleon was passing through the region and ordered his cook to prepare a sweet using local ingredients. The cook obtained buckwheat flour, butter, dried figs, grapes, honey, and nuts, and created what came to be known as bisciola. According to La Cucina Italiana, Napoleon was never in Valtellina. Since bisciola was traditionally a peasant food, its original recipe was never recorded and is likely an "ancient cake recipe".

=== Cavallucci ===
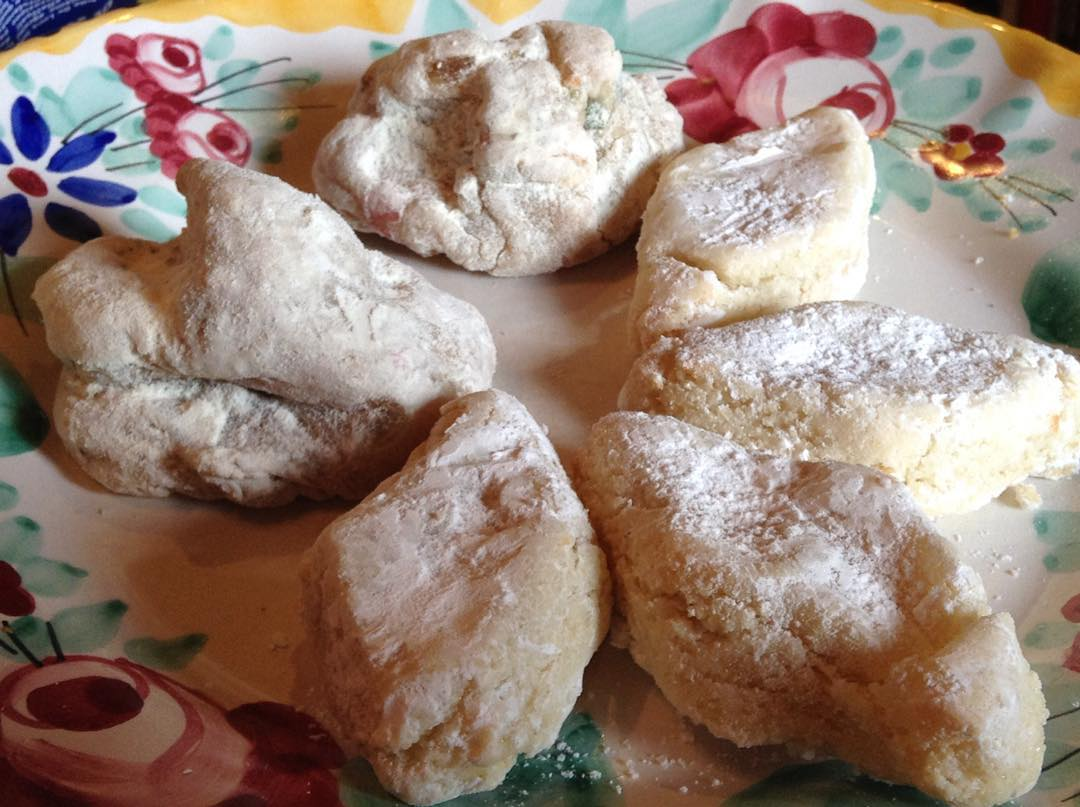
Cavallucci

Cavallucci is a rich Italian Christmas pastry prepared with anise, walnuts, candied fruits, coriander, and flour. They are Sienese in origin, and the name translates approximately to 'little horses'. The chewy biscuits traditionally use Tuscan millefiori honey as an essential ingredient in the dough. The cookies were originally imprinted with the image of a horse (cavalli is the Italian term for horses). The cookies sold today are a gentrified version of a pastry which is traceable to the reign of Lorenzo the Magnificent (1449–1492), when they were called biriquocoli.

Many hypotheses are associated with the origin of its name. According to the most popular version of the story, cavallucci were served to travelers on horseback as a source of nourishment for long trips. Along a similar vein, another speculation is that postal workers who delivered mail over long distances ate the cookies on a regular basis. Additionally surmised is that these sweets were the usual snack of servants who worked in horse stables of rich Italian aristocrats in Siena, a city which gained its fame for horse racing.

=== Veneziana ===
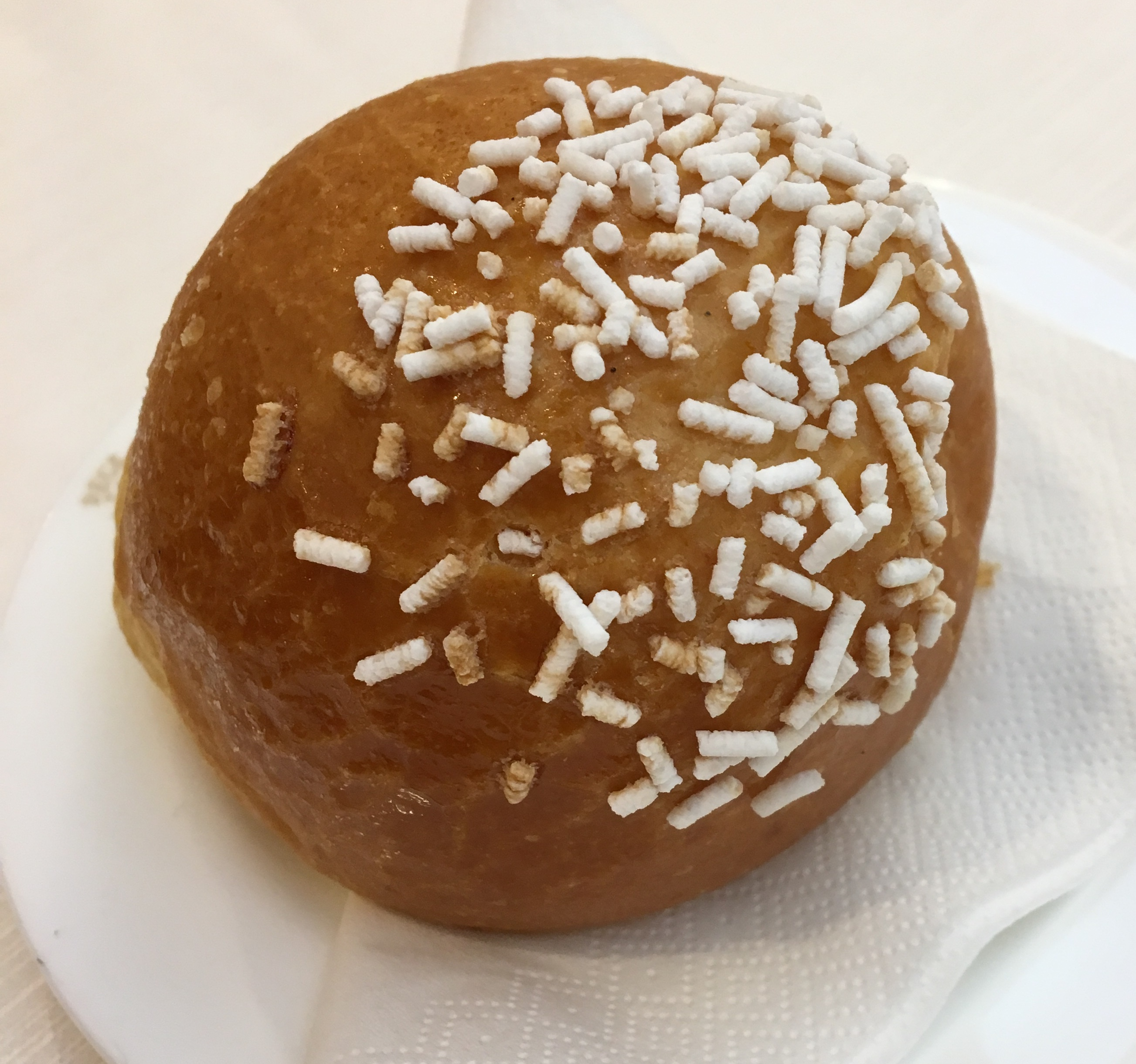
Veneziana

Veneziana is a sweet of the Lombard cuisine covered with sugar grains or almond icing. It is served in two versions: the bigger one is consumed during Christmas, like panettone; the smaller one is eaten as breakfast, along with cappuccino, like croissants. Veneziana is butter and flour-based and uses sourdough as leavening; the smaller version is usually plain, sometimes filled with custard, while the bigger version contains candied orange.

The history of veneziana is very similar to the history of panettone, which was created around 15th century. This sweet was once eaten during celebrations such as weddings and Christmas, while since the end of World War II is considered a breakfast food. Buondì, a popular snack in Italy, is the industrial version of veneziana.

=== Pizzelle ===
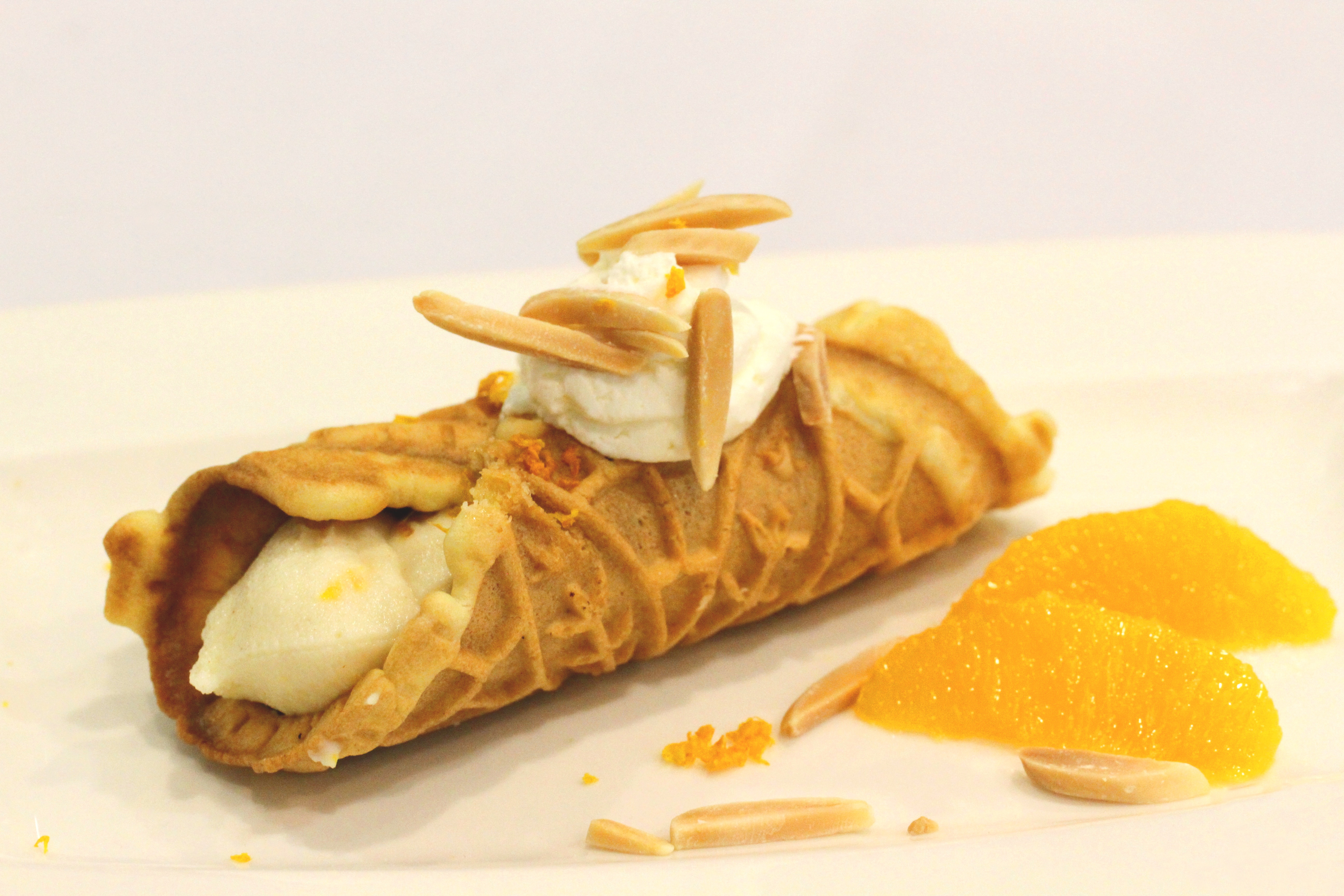
Pizzelle shaped into a cannoli and filled with an orange-almond creme

Pizzelle (sing.: pizzella) are traditional Italian waffle cookies made from flour, eggs, sugar, butter or vegetable oil, and flavoring (usually anise or anisette, less commonly vanilla or lemon zest). Pizzelle can be hard and crisp or soft and chewy depending on the ingredients and method of preparation. It can be molded into various shapes, including in the tubular shape of cannoli.

Pizzelle were originally made in Ortona, in the Abruzzo region of southern Italy. Many other cultures have developed a pizzelle-type cookie as part of their culture (for example, the Norwegian Krumkake). It is known to be one of the oldest cookies and is likely to have developed from the ancient Roman crustulum.

Pizzelle are also known as ferratelle or nevole in some parts of Abruzzo. Pizzelle are known as ferratelle in the Lazio region of Italy. In Molise they may be called ferratelle, cancelle or pizzelle.

Pizzelle are popular during Christmas and Easter. They are often found at Italian weddings, alongside other traditional pastries such as cannoli and traditional Italian cookies.

It is also common to sandwich two pizzelle with cannoli cream (ricotta blended with sugar) or hazelnut spread. Pizzelle, while still warm, can also be rolled into a tubular shape using a wooden dowel to create cannoli shells.

=== Mustacciuoli ===
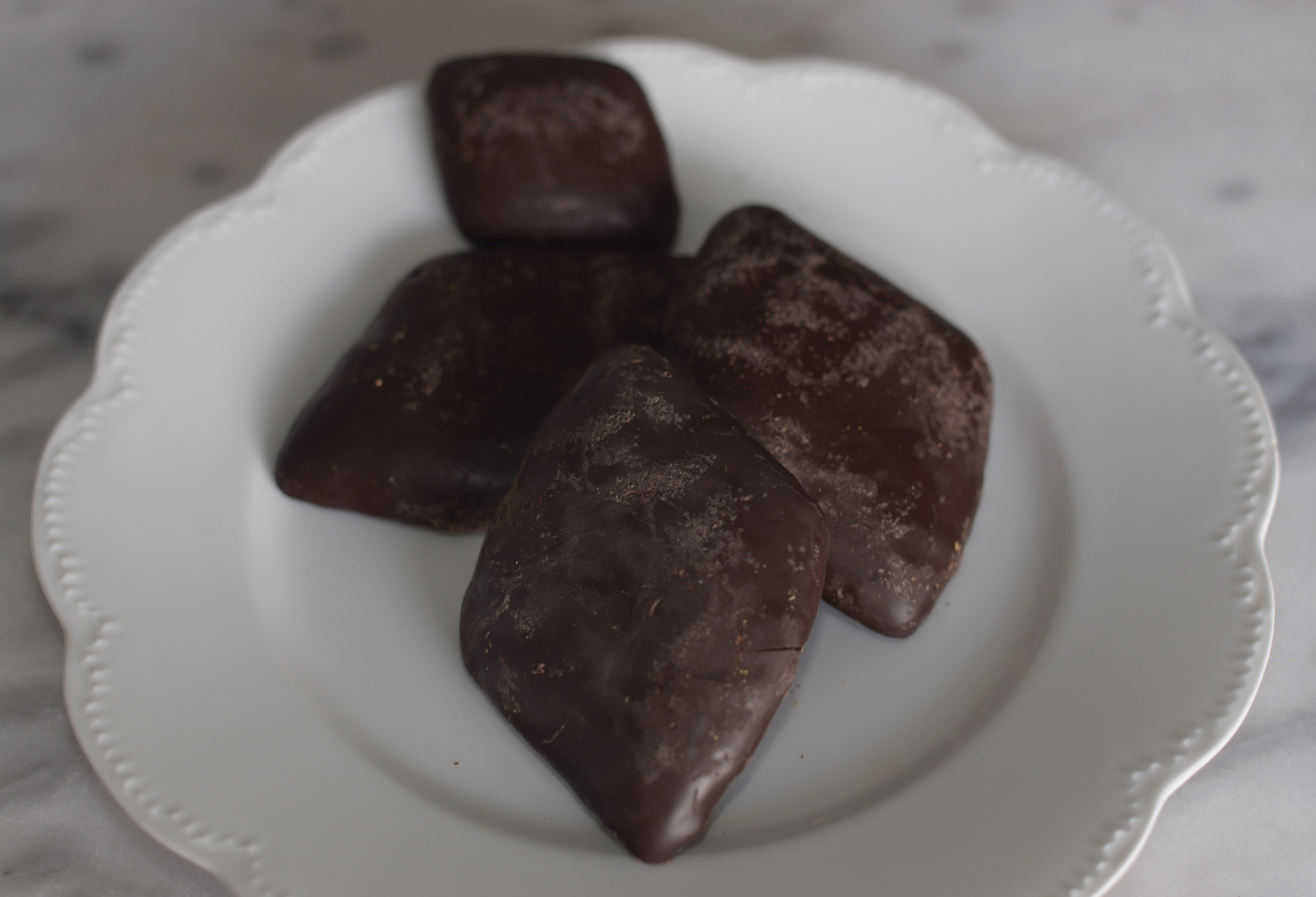
Mustacciuoli

Mustacciuoli (also known as mustaccioli or mostaccioli) is a traditional pastry from Naples, usually served at Christmas time. Mustaccioli takes the form of a parallelogram, and consist of a soft, spiced, cake-like interior, covered in chocolate. In recent years, they are many variations of mostaccioli sold in Naples, where the chocolate glaze may be replaced by a white chocolate frosting or icing sugar and candied fruit.

Mustacciolis are often sold alongside other Neapolitan sweets including Roccocò, raffiuoli, susamielli, and struffoli at Christmas time. Neapolitan mostacciolis were mentioned by Bartolomeo Scappi, personal cook of Pope Pius V as part of his pranzo alli XVIII di ottobre (18 October lunch).

=== Zelten ===
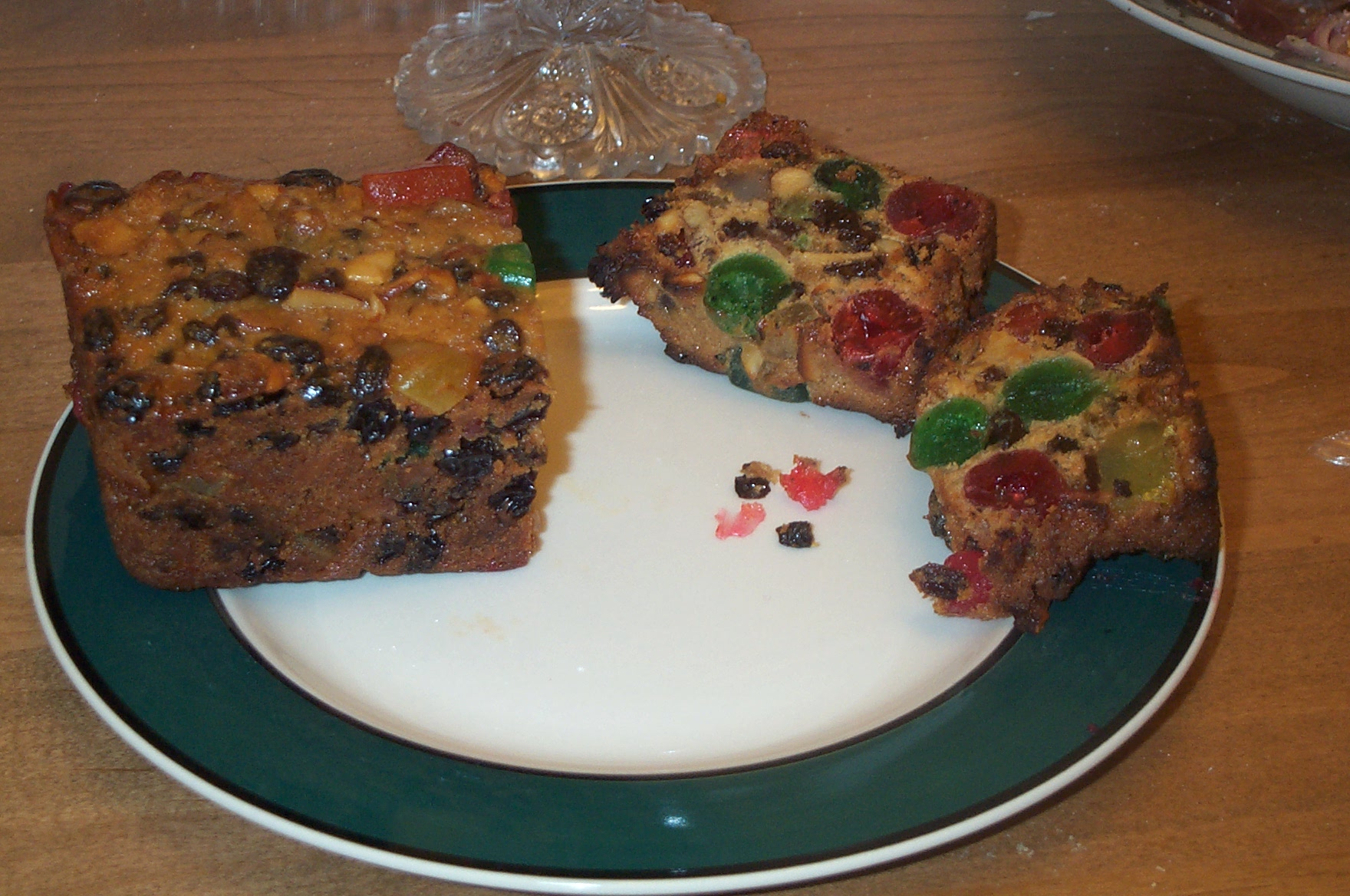
Zelten

Zelten is a traditional Italian fruitcake from South Tyrol prepared during Christmas. It is prepared using rye flour, wheat flour, dried and candied fruits, orange zest and various spices. The name derives from the word selten, a word in the nearby dialect meaning 'seldom', since it is usually only prepared once a year.

=== Mandorlato ===
Mandorlato is a dessert produced in the Cologna Veneta area, typical of the Christmas holidays, produced with four ingredients: honey, sugar, egg white and almonds. The exact date of the invention of this dessert is not known, although it is credible that mandorlato was already known and appreciated at the time of the Republic of Venice, which seems to have spread the name to Ottoman Greece. Cologna Veneta (from 1406 to 1797) was considered an integral part of the Venetian possessions. A first reference to mandorlato is contained in Lodovico Dolce's text in 1540.

== Cinepanettoni ==
The cinepanettoni (sing.: cinepanettone) are a series of farcical comedy films, one or two of which are scheduled for release annually in Italy during the Christmas period. The films were originally produced by Aurelio De Laurentiis' Filmauro studio. Despite their critical reception, by 2002, the films had grossed 700 billion lire ($350 million). Starting in 1983 with Vacanze di Natale ('Christmas Holidays') by Carlo Vanzina, some farcical or comic movie were released every year around Christmas time in Italy, and were known as cinepanettoni, a Portmanteau of Italian: cine for cinema, and panettone is a type of sweet bread traditionally eaten at Christmas.

These films are usually focused on the holidays of stereotypical Italians: bungling, wealthy and presumptuous members of the middle class who visit famous, glamorous or exotic places. Films were set for example in the Netherlands (Merry Christmas, 2001), Egypt (Christmas in Egypt – Natale sul Nilo, 2002), India (Christmas in India – Natale in India, 2003), America (Christmas in Miami, 2005, or Christmas in New York, 2006), Cortina d'Ampezzo (Christmas holidays in Cortina – Vacanze di Natale a Cortina, 2011). Directors included Carlo Vanzina, Enrico Oldoini, and Neri Parenti. Many of the screenplays are not related to Christmas, other than those set in Italy.

== New Year's Eve ==
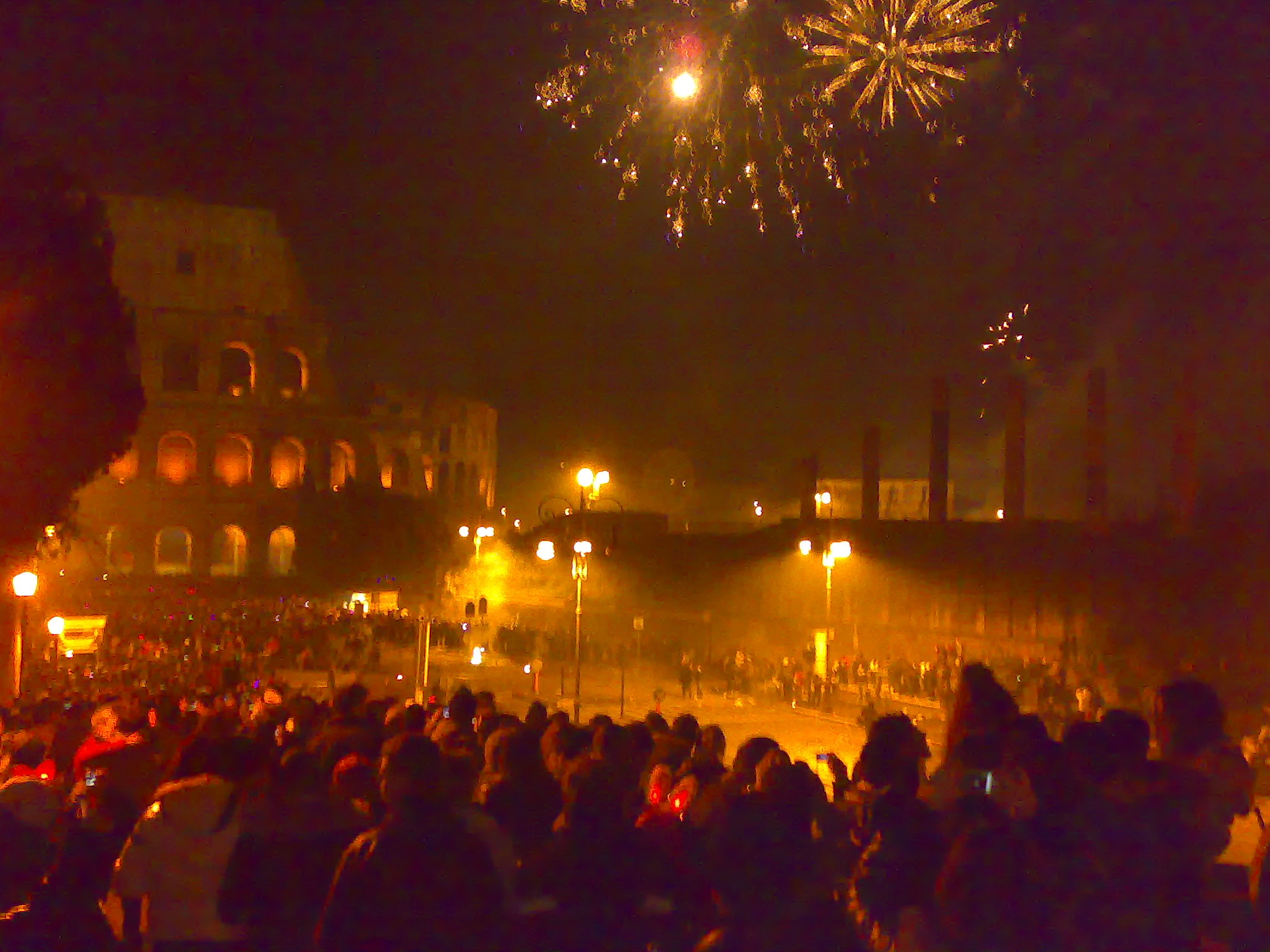
New Year's Eve fireworks in Rome in 2012

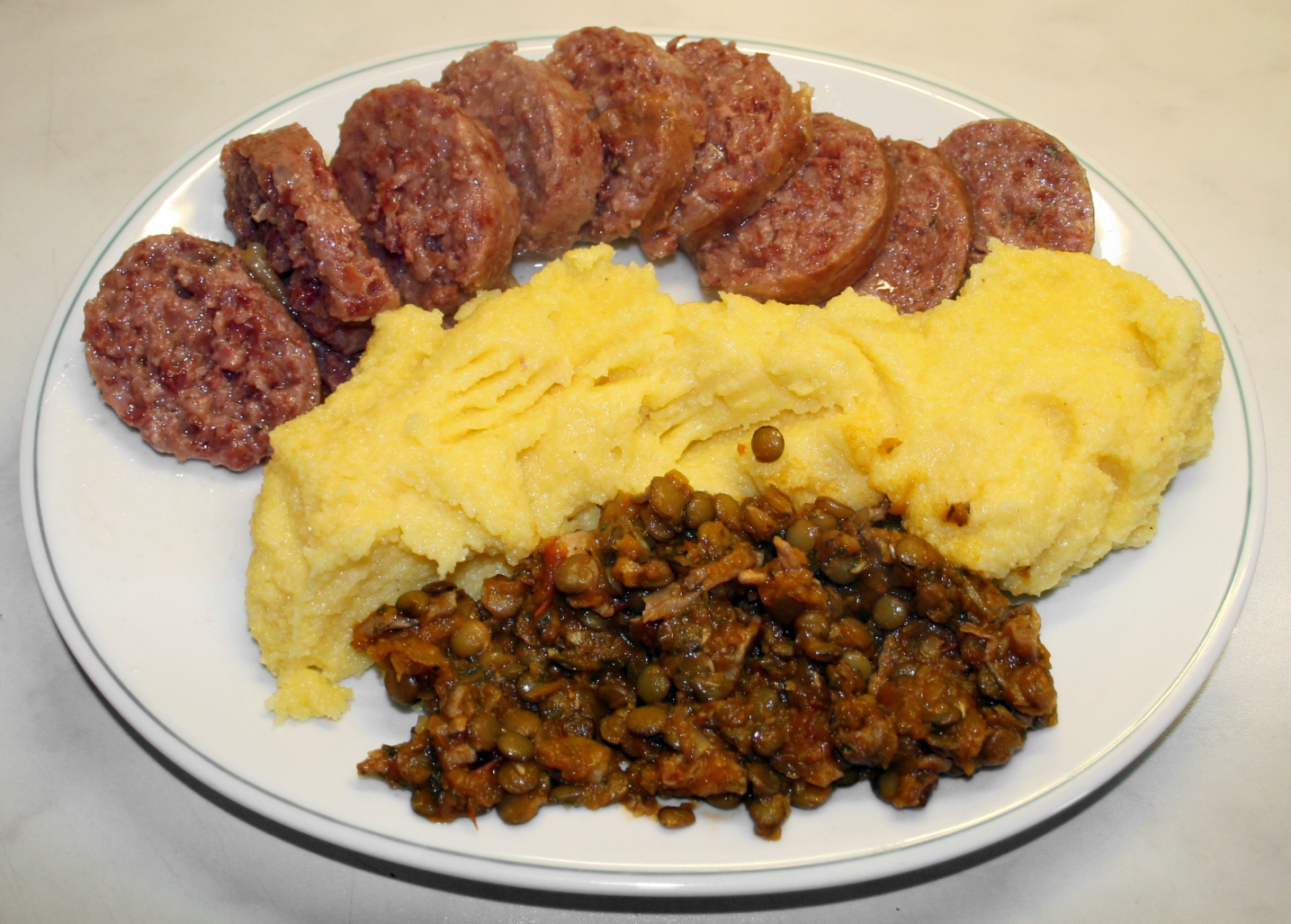
Cotechino, polenta and lentils

In Italy, New Year's Eve (Italian: Vigilia di Capodanno or Notte di San Silvestro) is celebrated by the observation of traditional rituals, such as wearing red underwear. An ancient tradition in southern regions which is rarely followed today was disposing of old or unused items by dropping them from the window.

Dinner is traditionally eaten with relatives and friends. It often includes zampone or cotechino (a meal made with pig's trotters or entrails), lentils and (in northern Italy) polenta. At 20:30, the President of Italy's address to the nation, produced by RAI, the state broadcaster, is broadcast countrywide on radio and TV networks.

Rarely followed today is the tradition that consist in eating lentil stew when the bell tolls midnight, one spoonful per bell. This is supposed to bring good fortune; the round lentils represent coins.

Usually the evening is spent with family or friends in a square (where concerts or various parties are organised) but also at home. Generally, starting from 10 seconds before midnight, it is customary to count down until reaching zero, thus wishing a happy new year, toasting with spumante and watching or lighting fireworks, shooting firecrackers or guns loaded with blanks.

On television, Rai 1 broadcasts a special to welcome the New Year at 21:00 called L'anno che verrà hosted by Amadeus with musical guests, surprises and many more.

== Christmas albums by Italian artists ==
- Buon Natale: The Christmas Album by Il Volo (2013)
- Laura Xmas by Laura Pausini (2016)
- My Christmas by Andrea Bocelli (2009)

== Filmography ==
- It's Never Too Late (1953) by Filippo Walter Ratti
- A Pistol for Ringo (1965) by Duccio Tessari
- The Christmas That Almost Wasn't (1966) by Rossano Brazzi
- Last Stop on the Night Train (1975) by Aldo Lado
- Vacanze di Natale (1983) by Carlo Vanzina
- Christmas Present (1986) by Pupi Avati
- Merry Christmas... Happy New Year (1989) by Luigi Comencini
- Vacanze di Natale '90 (1990) by Enrico Oldoini
- Vacanze di Natale '91 (1991) by Enrico Oldoini
- Vacanze di Natale '95 (1995) by Neri Parenti
- How the Toys Saved Christmas (1996) by Gianni Rodari
- We Free Kings (1996) by Sergio Citti
- Kisses and Hugs (1999) by Paolo Virzì
- Merry Christmas (2000) by Lucho Bender
- Merry Christmas (2001) by Neri Parenti
- 8 Women (2002) by François Ozon
- Christmas on the Nile (2002) by Neri Parenti
- Natale in India (2003) by Neri Parenti
- Opopomoz (2003) by Enzo D'Alò
- Christmas in Love (2004) by Neri Parenti
- Natale a Miami (2005) by Neri Parenti
- Natale a New York (2006) by Neri Parenti
- Natale in crociera (2007) by Neri Parenti
- Natale a Rio (2008) by Neri Parenti
- Natale a Beverly Hills (2009) by Neri Parenti
- Natale in Sudafrica (2010) by Neri Parenti
- The Santa Claus Gang (2010) by Paolo Genovese
- Vacanze di Natale a Cortina (2011) by Neri Parenti
- The Worst Christmas of My Life (2012) by Alessandro Genovesi
- Guess Who's Coming for Christmas? (2013) by Fausto Brizzi
- Un Natale stupefacente (2014) by Volfango De Biasi
- Natale col Boss (2015) by Volfango De Biasi
- Vacanze ai Caraibi (2015) by Neri Parenti
- Natale a Londra – Dio salvi la regina (2016) by Volfango De Biasi
- Natale da chef (2017) by Neri Parenti
- Natale a cinque stelle (2018) by Marco Risi
- The Legend of the Christmas Witch (2018) by Michele Soavi
- Once Upon a Time... in Bethlehem (2019) by Ficarra e Picone
- In vacanza su Marte (2020) by Neri Parenti
- When Mom Is Away... With the Family (2020) by Alessandro Genovesi
- 7 Women and a Murder (2021) by Alessandro Genovesi
- The Price of Family (2022) by Giovanni Bognetti

== See also ==
Media related to Christmas in Italy at Wikimedia Commons

- Befana
- Mount Ingino Christmas Tree
- Neapolitan nativity scene
- Public holidays in Italy
- Easter in Italy
