= Lombard cuisine =

Cuisine of the Lombardy region

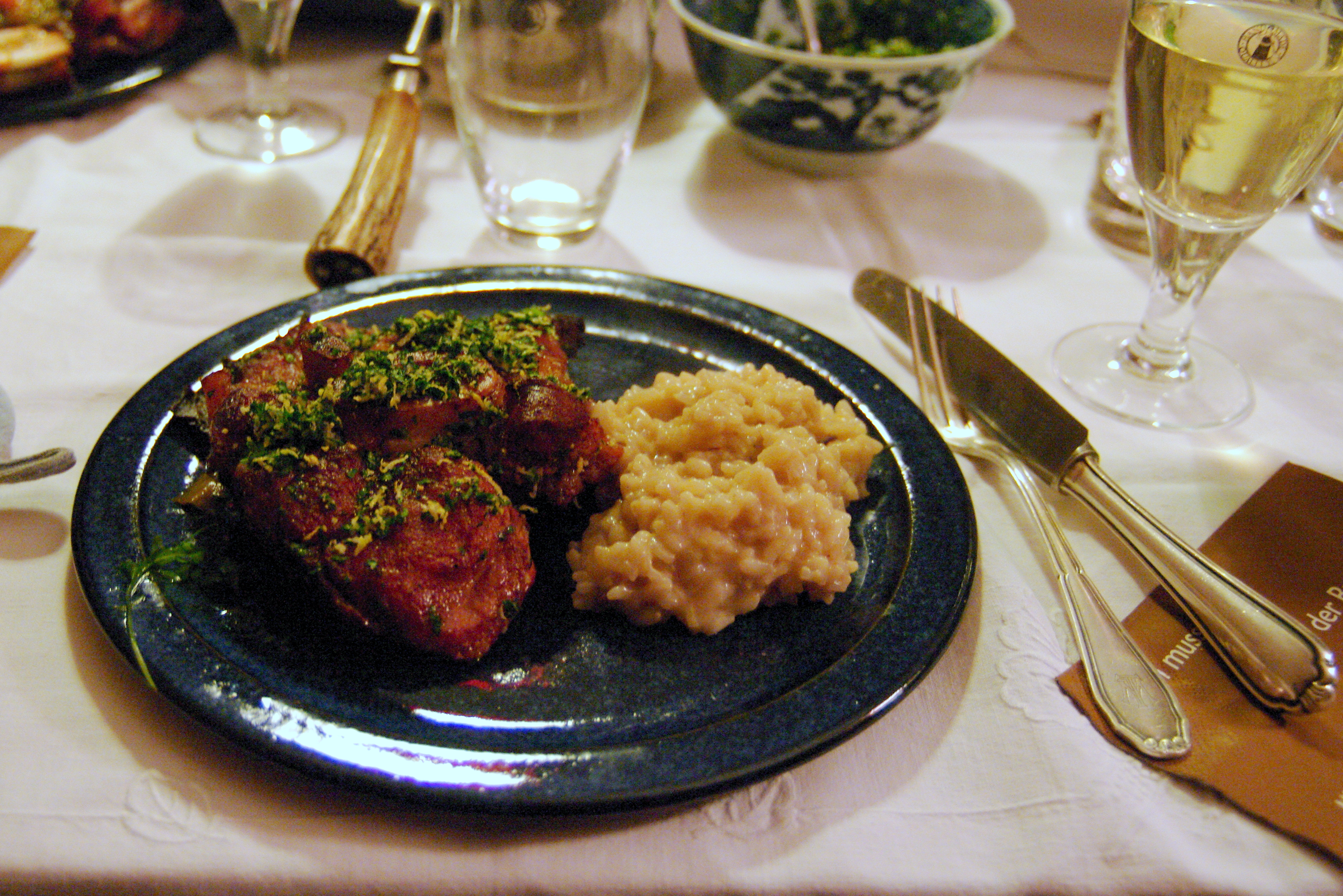
Ossobuco with risotto alla milanese

Lombard cuisine consists of the cooking traditions and practices of the Lombardy region. The historical events of its provinces and of the diversity of its territories resulted in a varied culinary tradition. First courses in Lombard cuisine range from risottos to soups and stuffed pasta (in broth or not), and a large choice of second-course meat or fish dishes, due to the many lakes and rivers of Lombardy.

The cuisine of the various Lombardy provinces have the following traits in common: prevalence of rice and stuffed pasta over dry pasta, both butter and olive oil for cooking, dishes cooked for a long time, as well as the widespread use of pork, milk and dairy products, and egg-based preparations, as well as the consumption of polenta, common to the whole of northern Italy.

== Overview ==
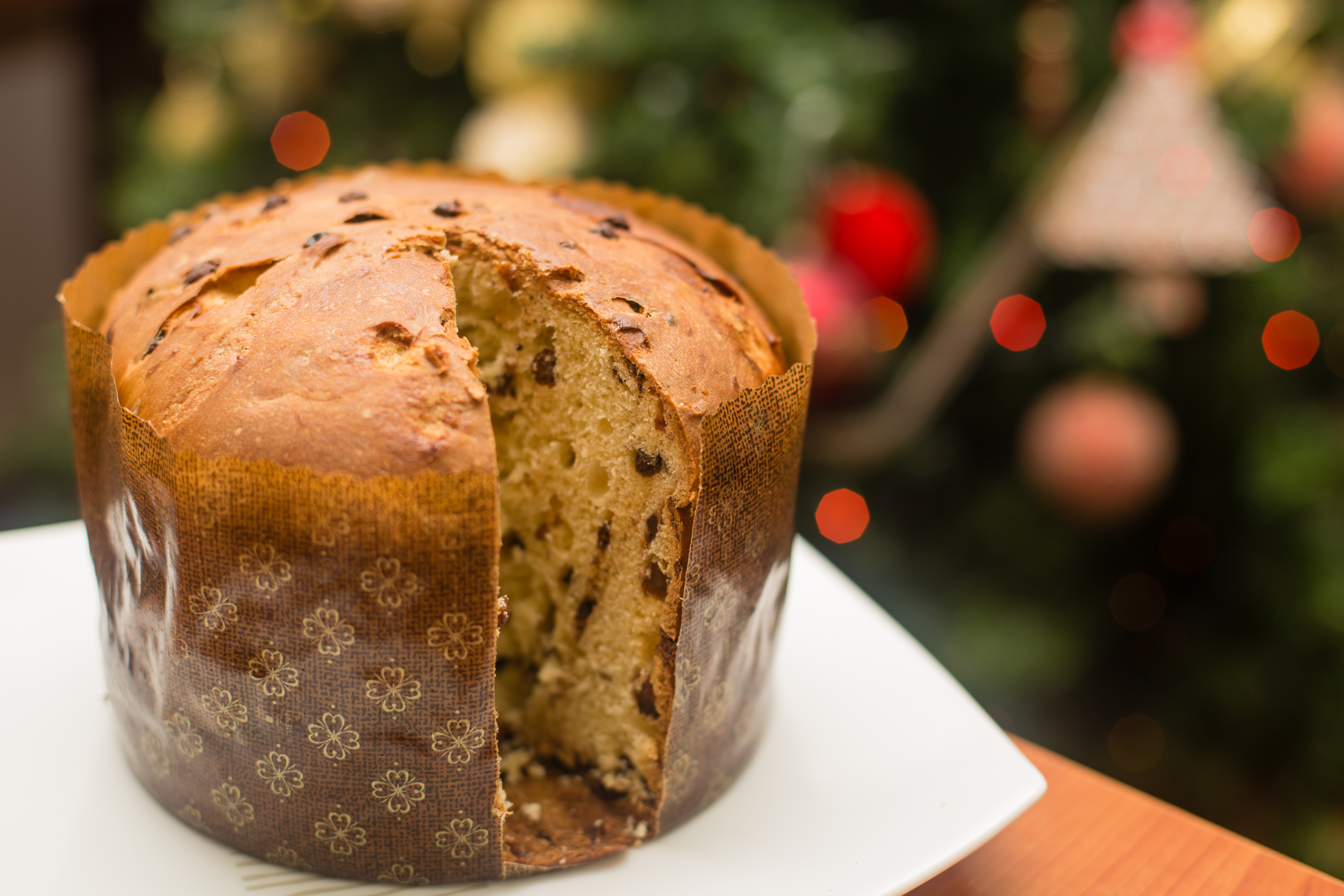
Panettone, an Lombard type of fruitcake, is enjoyed at Christmas and New Year in Western, Southern, and Southeastern Europe, as well as in South America, Eritrea, Australia, the United States and Canada..

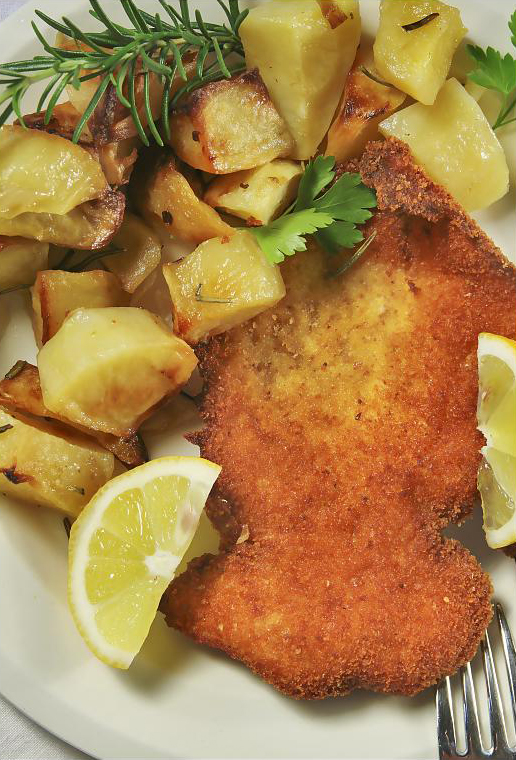
Cotoletta alla milanese

Due to the different historical events of its provinces and the variety of its territory, Lombard cuisine has a very varied culinary tradition. First courses in Lombard cuisine range from risotto, to soups and stuffed pasta, in broth or not. Main courses offer a variegated choice of meat or fish dishes of the tradition of the many lakes and rivers of Lombardy.

In general, the cuisine of the various provinces of Lombardy can be united by the prevalence of rice and stuffed pasta over dry pasta, butter instead of olive oil for cooking, prolonged cooking, the widespread use of pork, milk and derivatives, egg-based preparations, and the consumption of polenta that is common to all of northern Italy.

Rice dishes are very popular in this region, often found in soups as well as risotto. The best-known version is risotto alla milanese, flavoured with saffron. Due to its characteristic yellow colour, it is often called risotto giallo. The dish is sometimes served with ossobuco (cross-cut veal shanks braised with vegetables, white wine and broth).

Other regional specialties include cotoletta alla milanese (a fried breaded cutlet of veal similar to Wiener schnitzel, but cooked "bone-in"), cassoeula (a typically winter dish prepared with cabbage and pork), mostarda (rich condiment made with candied fruit and a mustard flavoured syrup), Valtellina's bresaola (air-dried salted beef), pizzoccheri (a flat ribbon pasta made with 80% buckwheat flour and 20% wheat flour cooked along with greens, cubed potatoes, and layered with pieces of Valtellina Casera cheese), agnolotti pavesi (a type of ravioli with Pavese stew filling), casoncelli (a type of stuffed pasta, usually garnished with melted butter and sage, typical of Bergamo) and tortelli di zucca (a type of ravioli with pumpkin filling, usually garnished with melted butter and sage or tomato).

Common in the whole Insubria area are bruscitti, originating from Alto Milanese, which consist in a braised meat dish cut very thin and cooked in wine and fennel seeds, historically obtained by stripping leftover meat. Regional cheeses include Grana Padano, Gorgonzola, crescenza, robiola, and Taleggio (the plains of central and southern Lombardy allow intensive cattle farming). Polenta is common across the region. Regional desserts include the famous panettone (soft sweet bread with raisins and candied citron and orange chunks).

== History ==
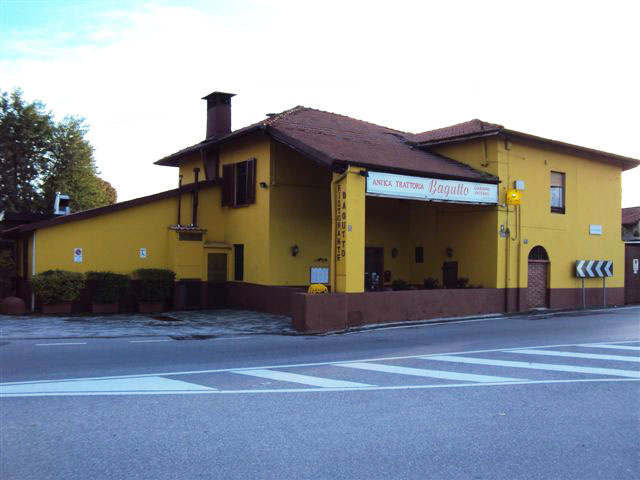
The Antica trattoria Bagutto in Milan, the oldest restaurant in Italy and the second in Europe

Lombard cooking has ancient historical roots dating back to the settlement of Celts in the Po Valley. The most ancient Lombardy dish is cuz, whose preparation has Celtic origins: it is a second course based on lamb that is common in Val Camonica.

Later on, the elaboration and methods of Lombardy's cooking were influenced by the dominations that followed one another during the centuries: from the ancient Romans to the Duchy of Milan and the Duchy of Mantua, that is the Austrians, the Spanish and the French, as well as the dominion of the Republic of Venice in the areas of Bergamo and Brescia. Milan is home to the oldest restaurant in Italy and the second in Europe, the Antica trattoria Bagutto, which has existed since at least 1284.

== Characteristics ==
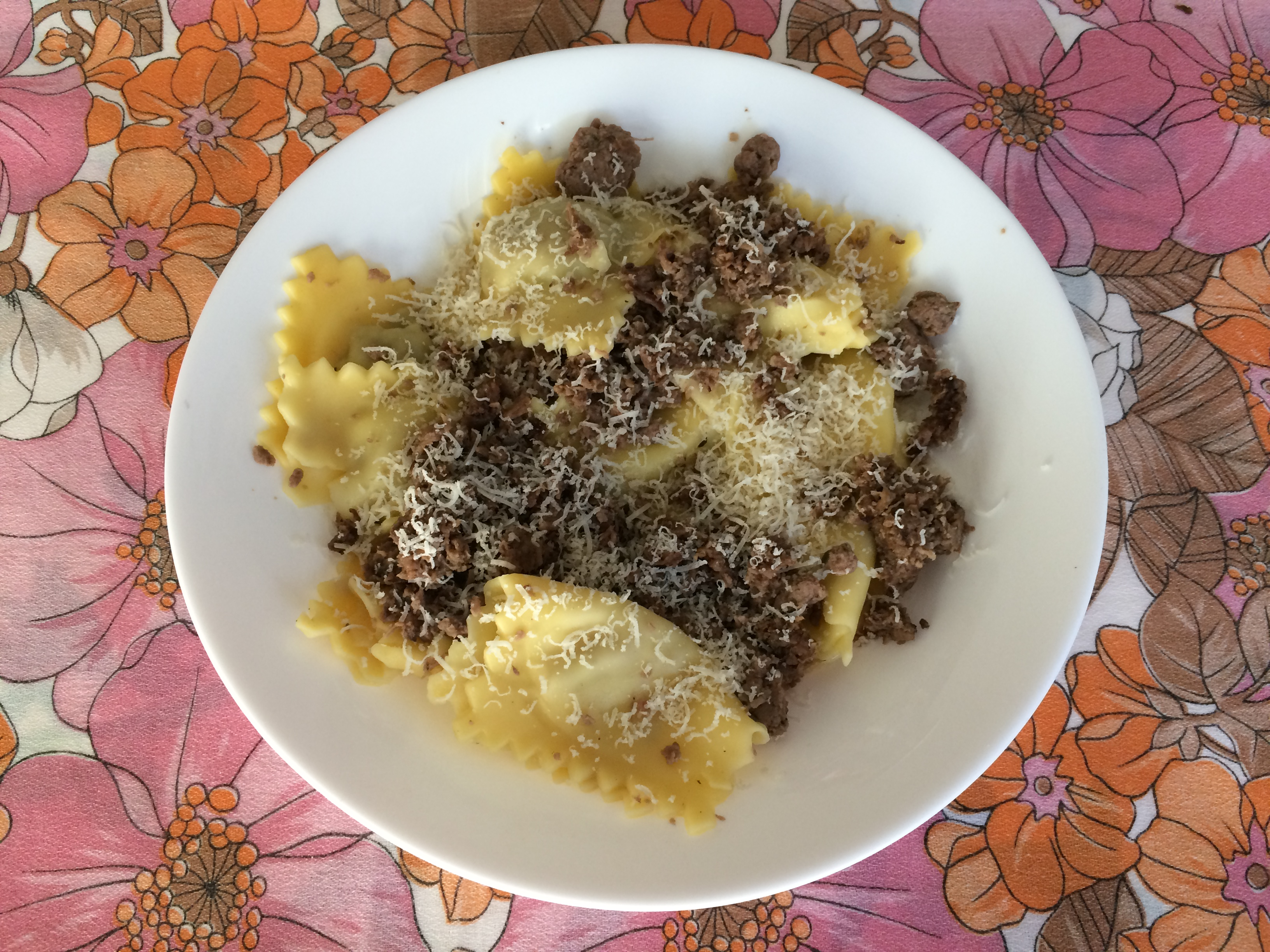
A dish of dry agnolotti pavesi, a type of stuffed pasta, with a Pavese stew-based sauce

Due to the great territorial and historical variety of Lombardy, it is very difficult to identify a unified Lombard cuisine: it makes more sense to identify a continuum of provincial cuisines having similar elements throughout the region.

Perhaps the most peculiar characteristic is the prevalence of filled pasta over dry pasta, but above all rice: from the latter it is possible to make both traditional poor man's rice soups and rice with meat or vegetables, up to the most elaborate and refined risottos. Related to the cooking of risotto, but not only, is the use of butter, and sometimes lard, in sautéing and frying instead of oil: the use of butter for cooking food is part of the high regional diffusion of milk and dairy products, Lombardy is the largest producer of milk in Italy with about 40% of the national production, and one of the regions with a greater variety of cheeses. The common Lombard panorama is completed by the use of recipes based on eggs (omelettes and similar preparations), pork and polenta, shared with the rest of the Po Valley.

From the point of view of preparation, preponderant, although not exclusive, are the recipes with prolonged cooking and low heat, such as braised, stewed and boiled meat, historically derived from the abundance of firewood in the territory and the consequent cooking on the grill.

A first approximate subdivision of Lombardy's cooking can be done from a territorial point of view: in the low Po Valley, in the areas where rice is cultivated, risottos will be more common together with vegetables widely cultivated in the plain, whereas as one gets closer to alpine areas will be more common dishes based on game or pasture animals, as well as side dishes based on potatoes and cabbage. Gastronomic islands are constituted by the lakes, where there are risottos and stews based on freshwater fish and olive cultivation is practiced: there are two olive oils with protected designation of origin (PDO), Garda and Laghi Lombardi.

A second classification can be done by taking into account the history of the single provinces and their geographical borders: as it is logical to expect, the eastern Lombard cuisine will have some traits in common with the Venetian one, the western one with the Piedmontese one based on braised meat and stews, the southern one with the Emilian one where preparations based on stuffed pastas predominate, whereas the cuisine of Valtellina will have some traits in common with the Alpine cuisine with a wide use of game, salami and cheese as base or condiment for main courses.

== Typical dishes ==
=== Antipasti ===
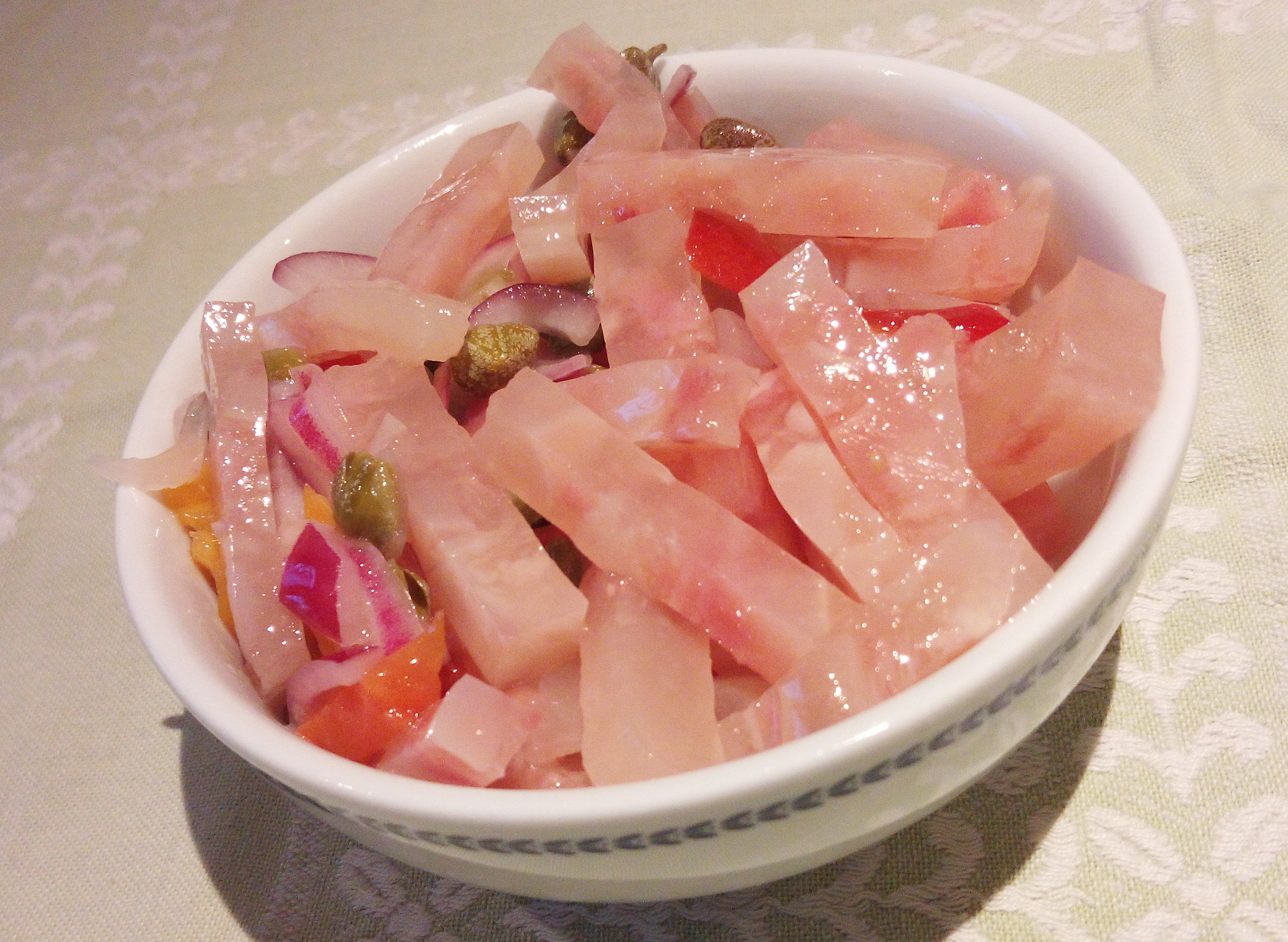
Nervetti in insalata milanesi

The most common appetizers on Lombard tables are based on cured meats and cheeses, widely spread in the region; however, they are often consumed as second courses or as the conclusion of a meal, accompanied or not by polenta or fried polenta.

Appetizers include sciatt valtellinesi, crispy buckwheat pancakes filled with cheese which is melted during cooking in butter, nervetti in insalata milanesi, prepared with calf feet, beans and onions, and margottini alla bergamasca, semolina cakes bound with egg, branzi and meat broth.

Among the pâtés are Milanese-style veal liver pâté, goose pâté from Lomellina and chub pâté from the Brescia area. A popular appetizer was once trifoliated snails, widely available in the wooded and agricultural territory.

=== Primi piatti ===
==== Primi piatti of rice ====
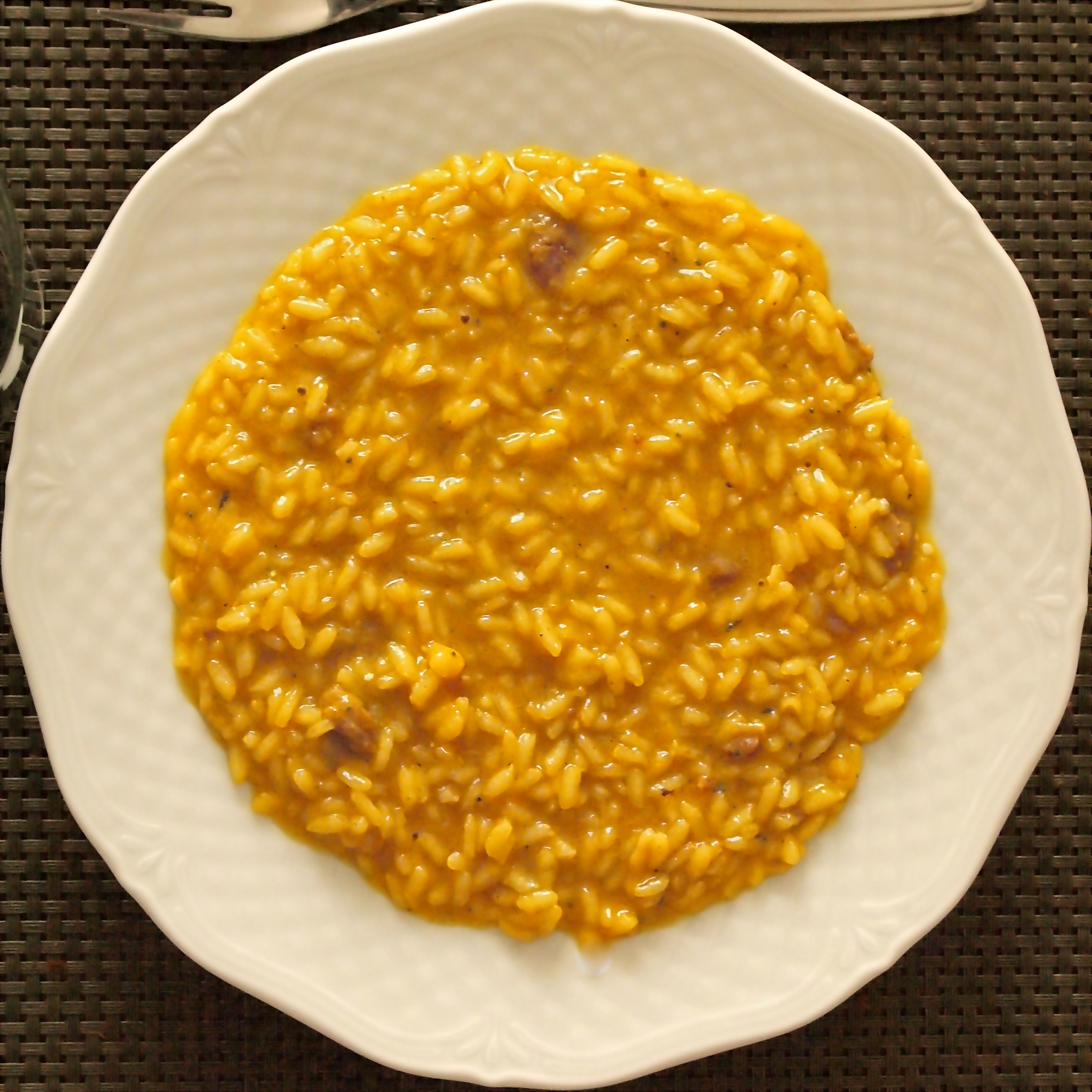
Risotto alla milanese

Rice is a common element to all the local cuisines of Lombardy, and represents the base of first courses from Valtellina to Mantovano: Lombardy is responsible for 42% of the whole Italian rice production. The "basic" rice preparation common to the whole region is rice in cagnone, rice boiled in salted water and seasoned with butter in which garlic and sage have been sautéed, and finally sprinkled with Grana cheese. It can also be served with asparagus or pumpkin. Besides this there are also soups prepared with rice, combined with typical vegetables of the whole region, such as cabbage, turnip, peas and coratella. The main dish of the region is risotto, rice toasted and then cooked with hot broth: common in the whole Lombardy territory is risotto with mushrooms, and with sausage.

Traditionally local, although known well outside the region, are risotto alla milanese, which owes its characteristic yellow color to saffron; its "simplified" version alla monzese without saffron and with luganega instead of beef marrow; and risotto alla pilota, typical of the Mantua area. In addition to meat and vegetable risottos, in the vicinity of the lakes fish risottos are common, such as risotto with perch from Lake Como and risotto with tench from Lake Garda.

==== Stuffed pasta ====
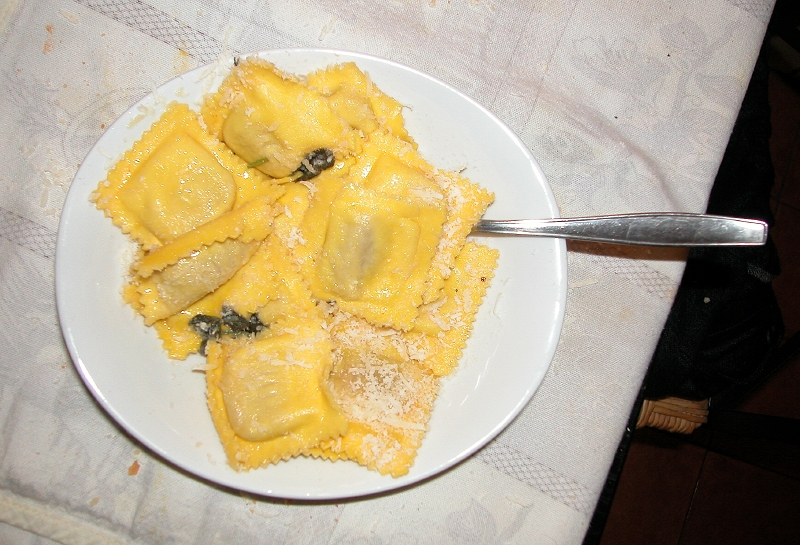
Pumpkin tortelli

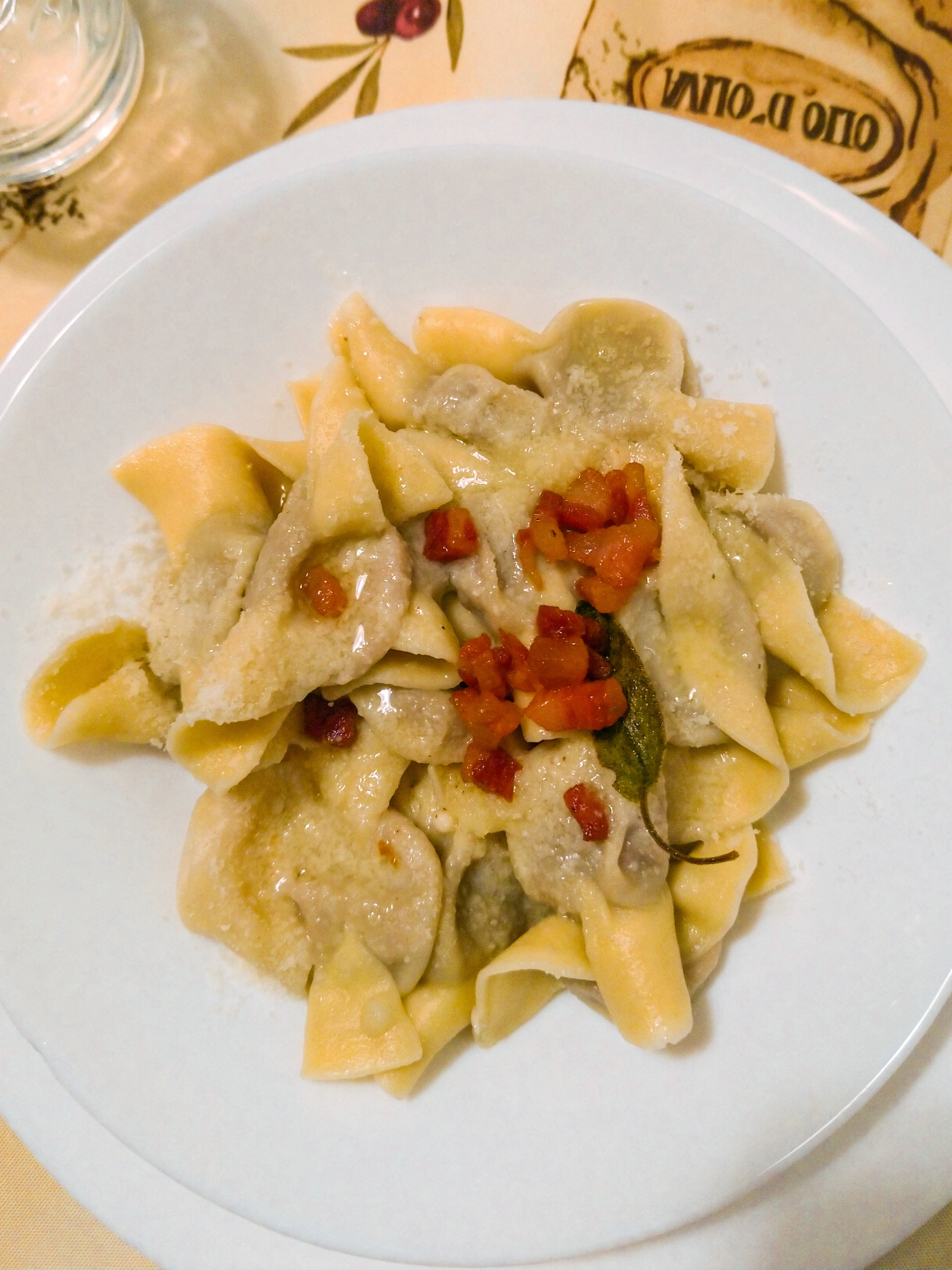
Casoncelli

A common stuffed pasta dish of the whole region are the so-called ravioli di magro, ravioli with a generic stuffing made of egg yolk, ricotta cheese and herbs which vary from area to area. Among the most common variants there are spinach and hop tops, whereas in the past, in times of economic hardship, ravioli were also filled with wild herbs, such as dandelion, nettles and borage.

Typical of the eastern provinces are casoncelli (casonsei), stuffed pasta of various shapes (half-moon shaped in Bergamo, square or "candy-like" in Brescia) stuffed with meat, Grana cheese and aromatic herbs and eaten with a sprinkling of butter and cheese, marubini in broth from the province of Cremona, square shaped and stuffed with braised meat, mixture of salami, Grana Padano cheese and nutmeg. In the province of Mantua are tortelli di zucca ('pumpkin tortelli'), to which is added apple mostarda and amaretto, and finally the very particular tortelli cremaschi, prepared with a filling of amaretti, raisins, mint, candied citron, mostaccini and lemon peel, as well as classic ingredients such as breadcrumbs and nutmeg. Belonging to the province of Pavia, in particular to Oltrepò Pavese are agnolotti pavesi.

==== Other types of pasta ====
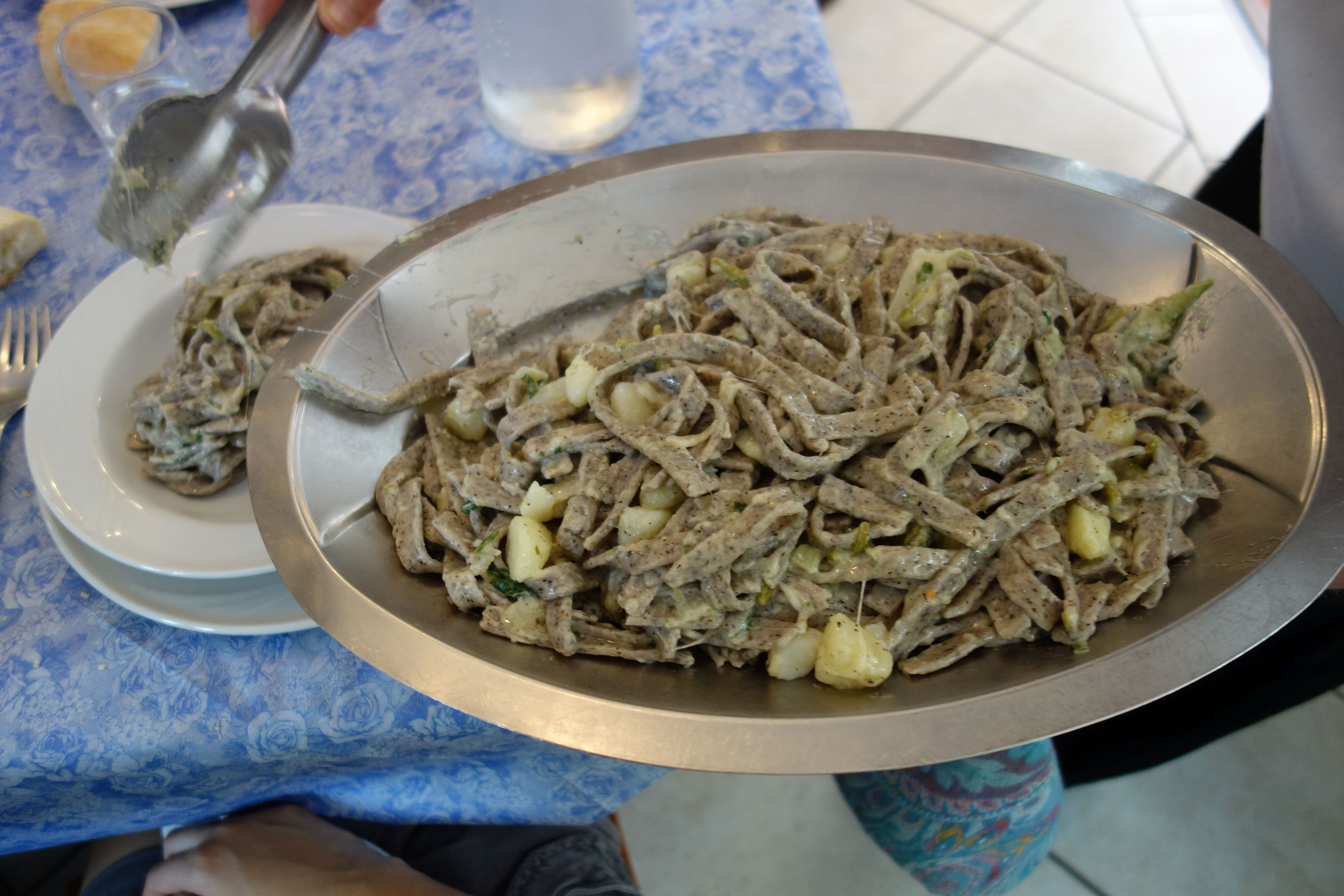
Pizzoccheri

Among the most famous examples of dry pasta are pizzoccheri della Valtellina, thick tagliatelle made of buckwheat flour and seasoned with potatoes, savoy cabbage and melted cheese, bigoli con sardelle, bigoli boiled and then browned in the cooking juices of sardines typical of the Mantua area, or bardele coi marai, or borage tagliatelle generally seasoned with butter typical of the Garda area of Brescia. Among the dishes similar to gnocchi can be mentioned, besides pumpkin gnocchi and pizzoccheri from Valchiavenna, small potato gnocchi with butter and melted cheese, strangolapreti from Bergamo, made of a dough made of stale bread, eggs, milk and herbs.

==== Soups ====
A renowned soup based on Lombardy's agricultural products is minestrone alla milanese, obtained by boiling the main vegetables growing in the region and flavored with lard and pork rinds. Other dishes of the poor tradition are the zuppa alla pavese, a soup made with broth, stale bread, eggs and grated cheese, and the pancotto, stale bread soaked in water, cooked in a pot together with butter and with the addition of meat, cooked in the whole region: a sort of "summation" of the two dishes is constituted by the minestra mariconda bresciana, obtained by adding to the previous ingredients also some cow's milk. In Brianza can also be found urgiada, a soup of barley with bacon, leeks and beans.

=== Secondi ===
Dishes of the Lombardy region are mainly based on meat, even though there are many examples of fish dishes spread near lakes and big rivers such as Po or Ticino.

==== Meat-based ====
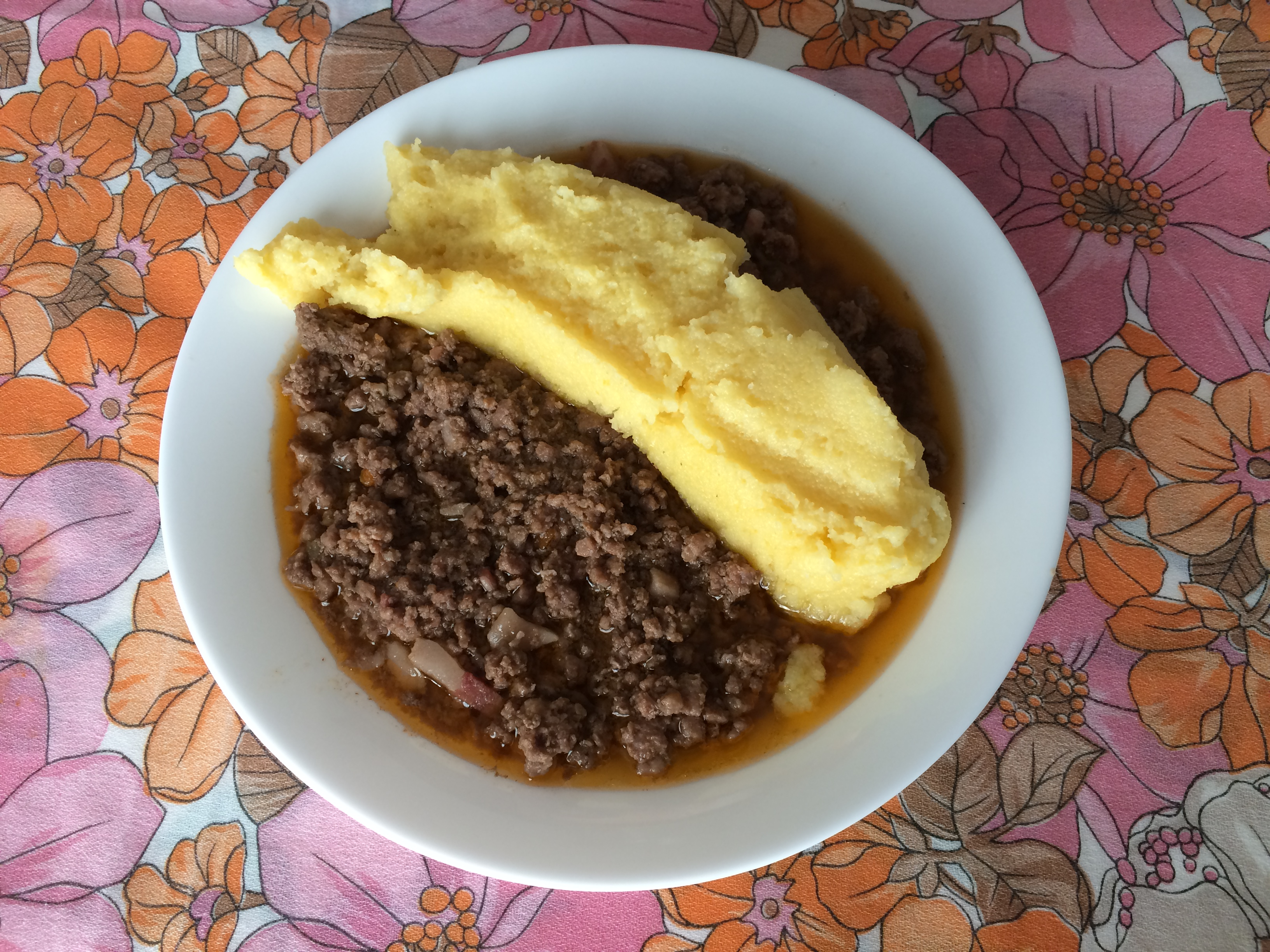
Bruscitti served with polenta

Widespread throughout the territory is sausage, especially pork sausage, in all its variants such as mutton sausage from Valcamonica and strinù. Another popular dish is bollito misto (mixed boiled meats), according to the province, prepared with different cuts of meat, accompanied by Cremonese or Mantuan mostarda: cotechino is also widely consumed throughout the territory and is sometimes served together with bollito misto. The most famous variant of the territory is the gran bollito cremonese, in which are added to the classic boiled meat cuts, calf's head, calf's tongue and pot salami, accompanied by the classic boiled sauces.

From Milan but common in the whole western part of Lombardy are cassoeula, a sort of stew with ribs, luganega and cabbage, to which can be added other parts of the pig such as rind and pig's foot according to the area, and rosticciata (rustisciada), a dish made of sausage and pork shoulder with onions. Always common in the whole Insubria area are bruscitti, originating from Alto Milanese, which consist in a braised meat dish cut very thin and cooked in wine and fennel seeds, historically obtained by stripping leftover meat. Typical of Milanese cooking is instead ossobuco.

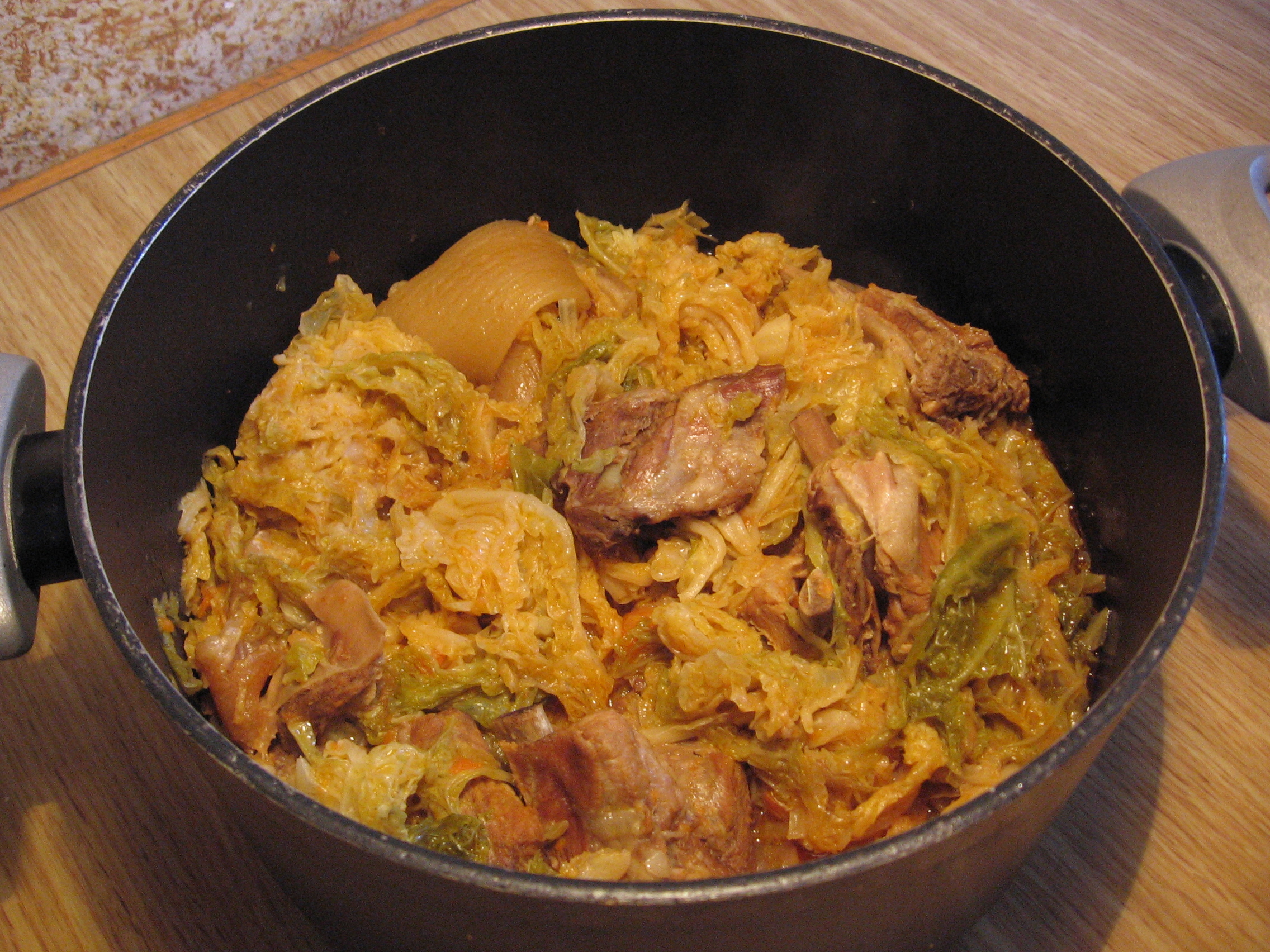
A crockpot of cassoeula. It is a typical dish of the popular tradition, main dish of many Lombard sagre.

In the area of Bergamo and Brescia is known the dish of polenta e osei, where birds such as thrushes or larks are browned in butter or on the spit and served together with polenta, to which is added the pork alla bresciana. In the province of Mantua, beef stew and donkey stew are common: in general, stews are quite common in the lowlands, as in the case of Pavia-style stew.

In the Alpine, cuisine of Valtellina can be mentioned pork ribs al lavècc, where marinated pork ribs are cooked for hours with wine in lavècc, particular pots made of soapstone, and pork alla pioda, where different cuts of pork are cooked on the pioda, a stone slab on which are also cooked vegetables such as potatoes and eggplants. Widespread in the whole alpine territory, between Lecco, Bergamo, Sondrio and Brescia, are stews and ragouts of Alpine fauna such as roe deer, deer and hares, often accompanied by polenta.

Veal meat is particularly used in the Milan area and is at the base of two of the most popular city dishes: cotoletta alla milanese and ossobuco, traditionally prepared with sautéed parsley, garlic and lemon zest and served as a single dish together with risotto. Goose meat is widely consumed in the Pavia and Lomellina areas for the preparation of first and second courses and sausages.

==== Fish-based ====
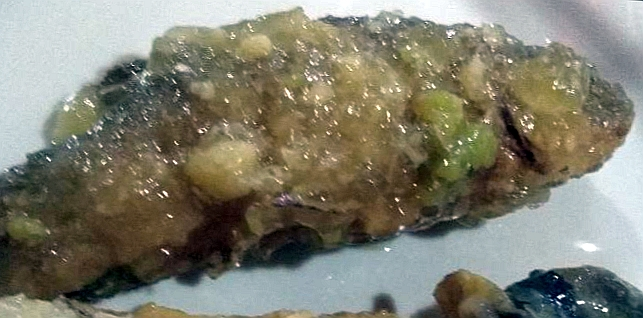
Tinca in carpione

The most famous fish dish of Lake Como are the missoltini, salted and dried agoni on special "wheels", the misolta, which are then cooked on the grill and eaten possibly with toasted polenta and red wine: fishing and its preparation were a real ritual, and in the villages of the Como Riviera occupying someone else's fishing place was considered a serious offense. Other larian preparations are the lavarello or the alborelle, which can be fried or in carpione.

On Lake Garda, famous dishes are trout baked with mushrooms and eel Gardesana, cooked on the grill and seasoned with oil and lemon, both typical products of the Benaco. Eel was once also cooked near rivers, whereas today it has practically disappeared: on the Mantuan banks of the Po, fried fish and pike in sauce are typical. Dishes based on fresh water fish can also be found in the Pavese area and in western Lombardy: in these same areas is historically prepared the frog, once widely spread in rice fields: frog is also present in other areas such as Val Camonica, where the typical frog cake is prepared.

==== Vegetarian ====
Typical vegetables of the Lombard plain are: celery, beans, green beans, carrots, leek, zucchini, eggplant, pumpkin, tomato, spinach and asparagus; whereas because of their rusticity, potatoes and savoy cabbage can be cultivated even in the coldest mountain areas. Among the second courses based on vegetables there are various versions of stuffed vegetables, above all zucchini, savoy cabbage meatballs and asparagus Milanese style, boiled and then laid on a fried egg (Oeuf in cereghin) and chard parmigiana. With herbs such as mint, chives, parsley and chervil it was customary to prepare the omelette with fine herbs.

=== Polenta ===
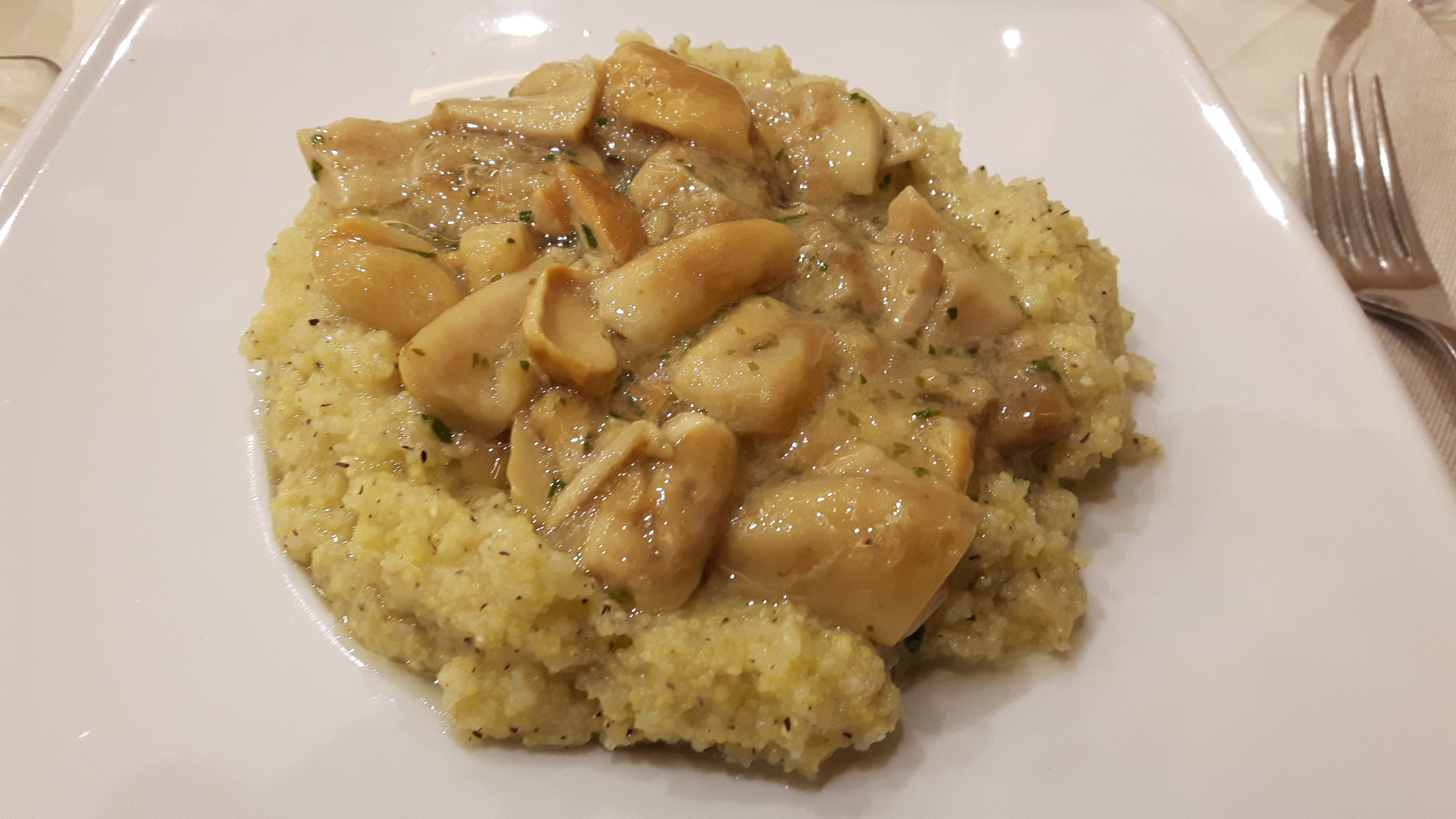
Polenta with mushrooms

In previous centuries, polenta was the staple food of Lombard people: polenta could be eaten alone or as a side dish in meat dishes, such as the famous polenta e osei, vegetables, such as polenta with mushrooms, with lard for pulenta e gras pestà, or with one of the many cheeses. However, there are many seasonings and variants of the classic polenta:

- Polenta taragna, typical of Valtellina and of the alpine areas of Bergamo and Brescia, buckwheat flour is added to the corn flour, giving the polenta a darker color than the characteristic yellow one.
- Polenta uncia, from the Como area, prepared by adding cheese and butter over which garlic and sage have been browned while the polenta is still hot in the pot.
- Polenta cròpa, typical of the upper Valtellina, cooked in cream.
- Pult, typical of Lecco, made with wheat flour added to corn flour.
- Tóch, Como area and similar to polenta uncia, in which the cheese and butter were added later to the part of the polenta that had been taken out and not melted inside.

The toch was the base of the ritual of toch e regell, where once the polenta was consumed, the copper pot was put back on the fire: once the pot was heated, red wine with cloves, cinnamon and lemon rind was poured inside. The wine, which softened the hardened polenta on the walls of the pot, was then drunk.

Polenta, as well as corn flour, could be reused in its leftovers to create sweets, as in the case of the Mantuan fiapòn.

=== Sides, sauces and seasonings ===
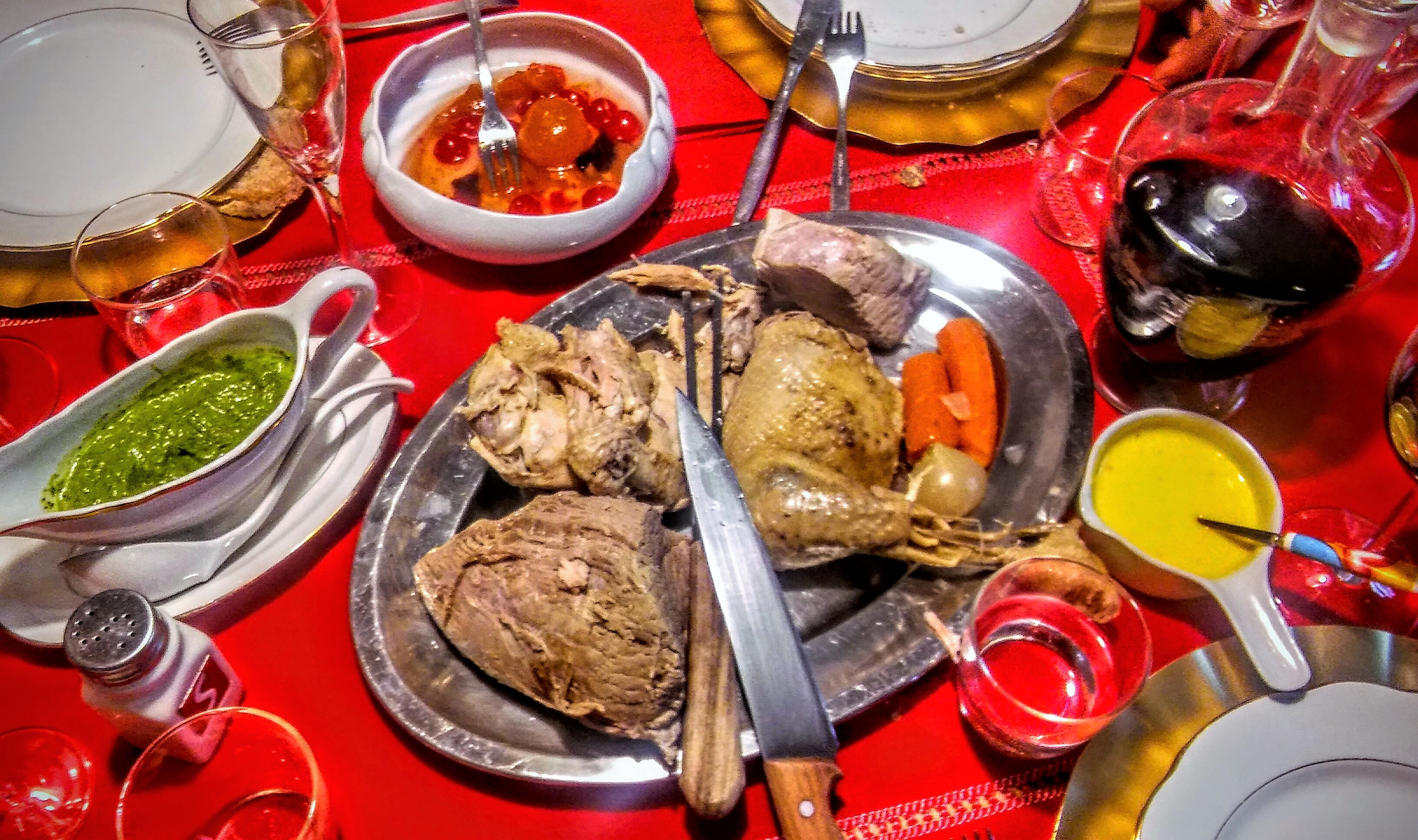
Mixed boiled beef, capon and pork, with green sauce, mustard and yellow sauce

Typical condiment which is not to be missed when boiled meat is served, is mustard, which is however an excellent match with the most flavorsome cheeses: the most common versions are Cremona mustard, with cherries, tangerines, peaches and pears infused in a syrup with mustard oil, Voghera mustard, similar to the Cremonese one but less spicy, and mostarda mantovana, prepared with pears, apples, quince, pumpkin and melon. Widespread is also mostarda di cipolle (onion mustard), more similar to a jam because of its consistency, but always prepared with the addition of mustard essence.

To accompany the mixed boiled meat, there are also the peverata, made with capers, anchovies, garlic and hot pepper, typical of Pavia and Brianza (where there is no hot pepper), the horseradish sauce, made with horseradish and vinegar, and the grattacù sauce, made with rosehip berries, wine and sugar. Other sauces, partly shared with relative variants in the whole northern Italy, are green sauce (or bagnetto verde), made of parsley, oil and anchovies (compared to the original Piedmontese version, in Lombardy stale bread and egg yolk are also added), red sauce, obtained by cooking tomatoes, peppers and carrots.

=== Desserts ===
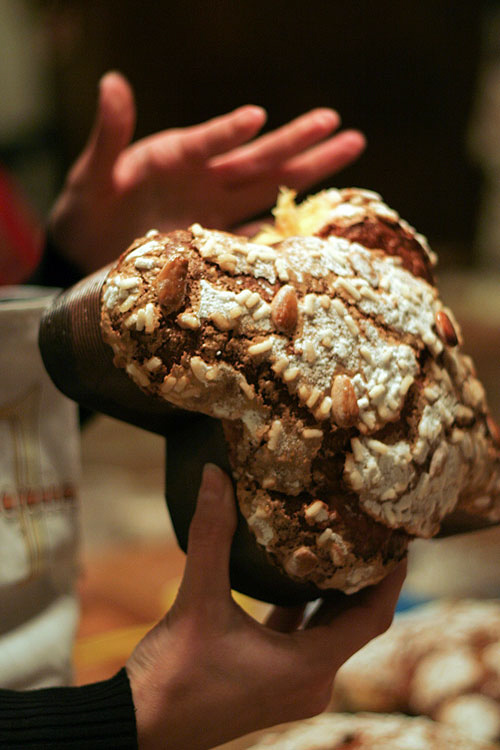
Italian Easter bread, the Colomba di Pasqua. It is the Easter counterpart of the two well-known Italian Christmas desserts, panettone and pandoro.

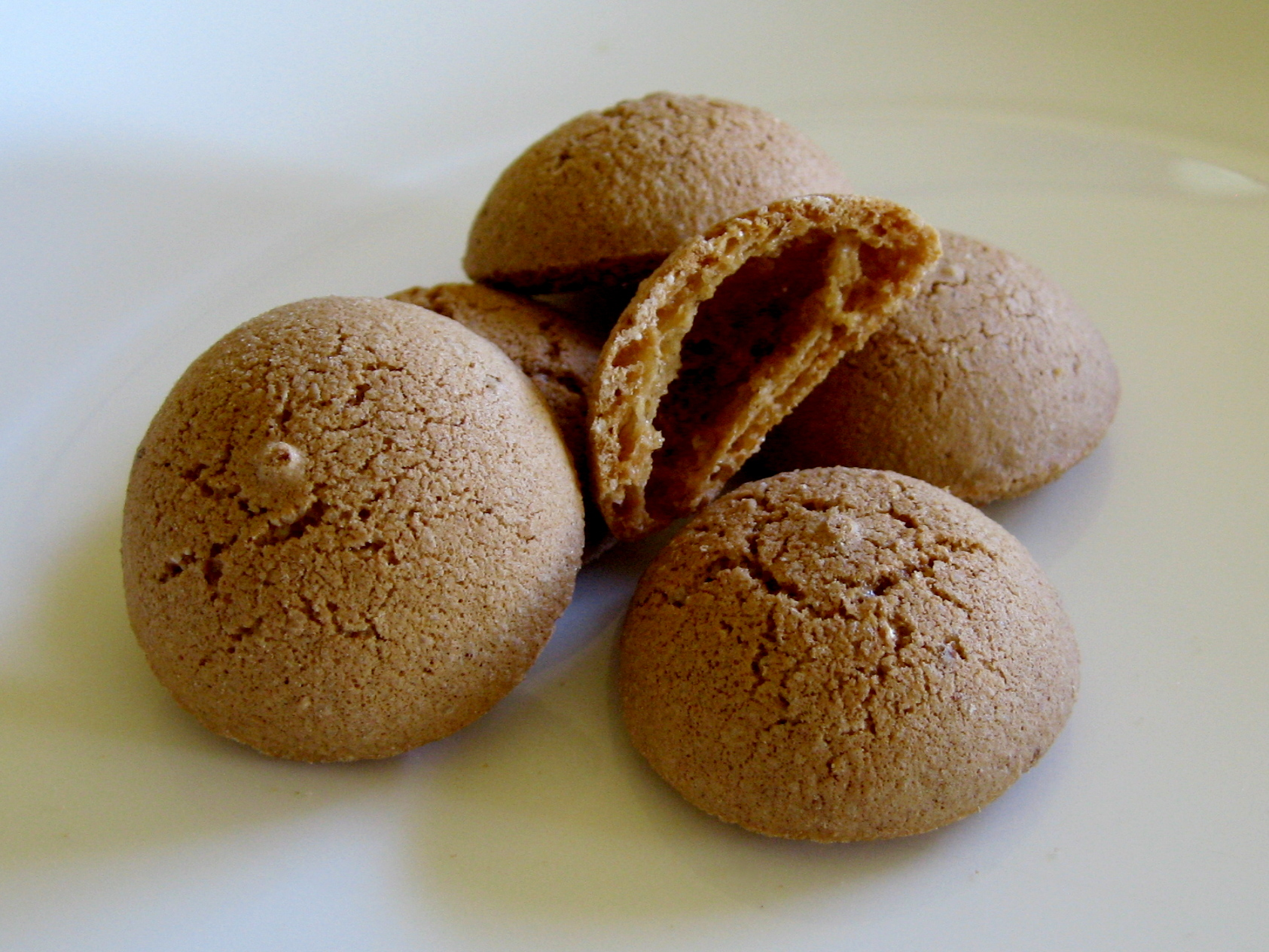
Amaretti di Saronno

The most famous Lombard sweets are panettone and colomba, belonging to the Milanese confectionery tradition: by now spread all over Italy, the first one is a typical Christmas cake with a cylindrical shape whose dough is enriched with raisins and candied fruit while the second one is generally consumed during Easter time, with a dough similar to panettone, but shaped like a dove and covered with icing and sugar. Another typical Milanese sweet of Christmas festivities, in particular of New Year's Eve, is carsenza, which is made of raisins and apples.

A elaborated version, with a dough halfway between panettone and brioche and covered with icing and sugar grains is veneziana: consumed in the big version, of the size of a traditional panettone, at Christmas, during the year it is instead consumed in "monodose" portions of the size of a doughnut. Other Christmas sweets outside the Milanese territory are the bisciola valtellinese, a loaf of bread with a dough similar to panettone with raisins, and the bossolà bresciano, obtained by three successive leavening.

Widespread all over Lombardy are frittelle, which have different names according to the ingredients and the method of preparation as well as the area of origin: very common are chestnut frittelle, because of the flour used, and apple frittelle, because of the filling ingredient.

Other famous sweets of the region are Cremona nougat (turòon), according to the legend created by local confectioners for the wedding of Francesco Sforza and Bianca Maria Visconti, and amaretti di Saronno, crispy cookies made of almonds, egg white and armelline. Probably influenced by Piedmontese confectionery are baci di Cremona, similar to baci di dama but with a crispy cookie made of hazelnut flour, and baci del Signore di Pavia, more flattened, filled with orange marmalade and half covered with melted chocolate. Among other cookies, we have offelle di Parona, sometimes prepared with rice flour, mostaccini, a Cremonese cookie prepared with the addition of, among other spices, clove, mace, coriander and star anise, biscottini di Prosto, a cookie with a high content of butter cooked twice in the oven typical of Valchiavenna.

In the area of the low plain, there are a famous series of cakes: the Mantuan torta delle rose, so called because it is made up of various forms of rolled dough, the Anello di Monaco, a sort of high doughnut made of leavened dough covered with icing, and the sbrisolona cake, a cake made of yellow flour and almonds which is particularly crumbly, and its similar Lodi cake tortionata, prepared with white flour instead of yellow.

From Cremona are spongarda, a cake filled with dried fruit, and torta Bertolina, made with strawberry grapes, and finally torta del Paradiso from Pavia. Sweet version of the famous dish from Bergamo is polenta e osei, made with sweet polenta covered with yellow almond paste decorated with chocolate birds or marzipan.

Typical of western Lombardy are brutti ma buoni from Gavirate, sweets made of almonds and hazelnuts, chiaro di Luna from Paullo, the torta paesana from Brianza, made of cocoa, milk and stale bread, created to reuse bread left over from meals. Prepared with maize flour are Amor polenta, from Varese, and pan meino (pan de mej), a sort of small sweet focaccia flavored with elder flowers.

== Typical and traditional products ==
Lombardy, thanks to its territorial variety has one of the highest numbers of PDO and PGI products, to be precise 34 (updated January 2019): 14 cheeses, 10 sausages and salami, 4 types of fruits and vegetables, 2 species of fish, 2 designations of olive oil and 1 honey. The region also has 250 Products with a designation of origin recognized by the Ministry of Agriculture Food and Forestry according to the 2017 revision.

=== Cheese ===
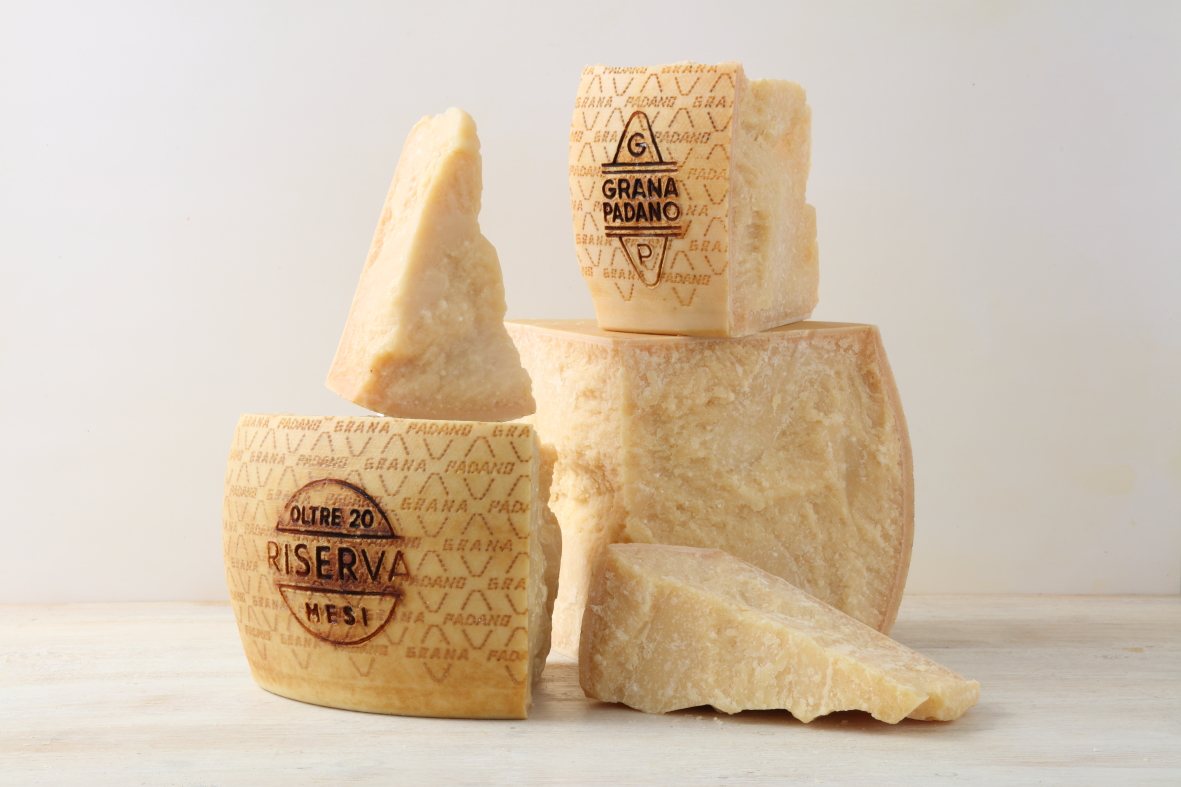
Grana Padano DPO

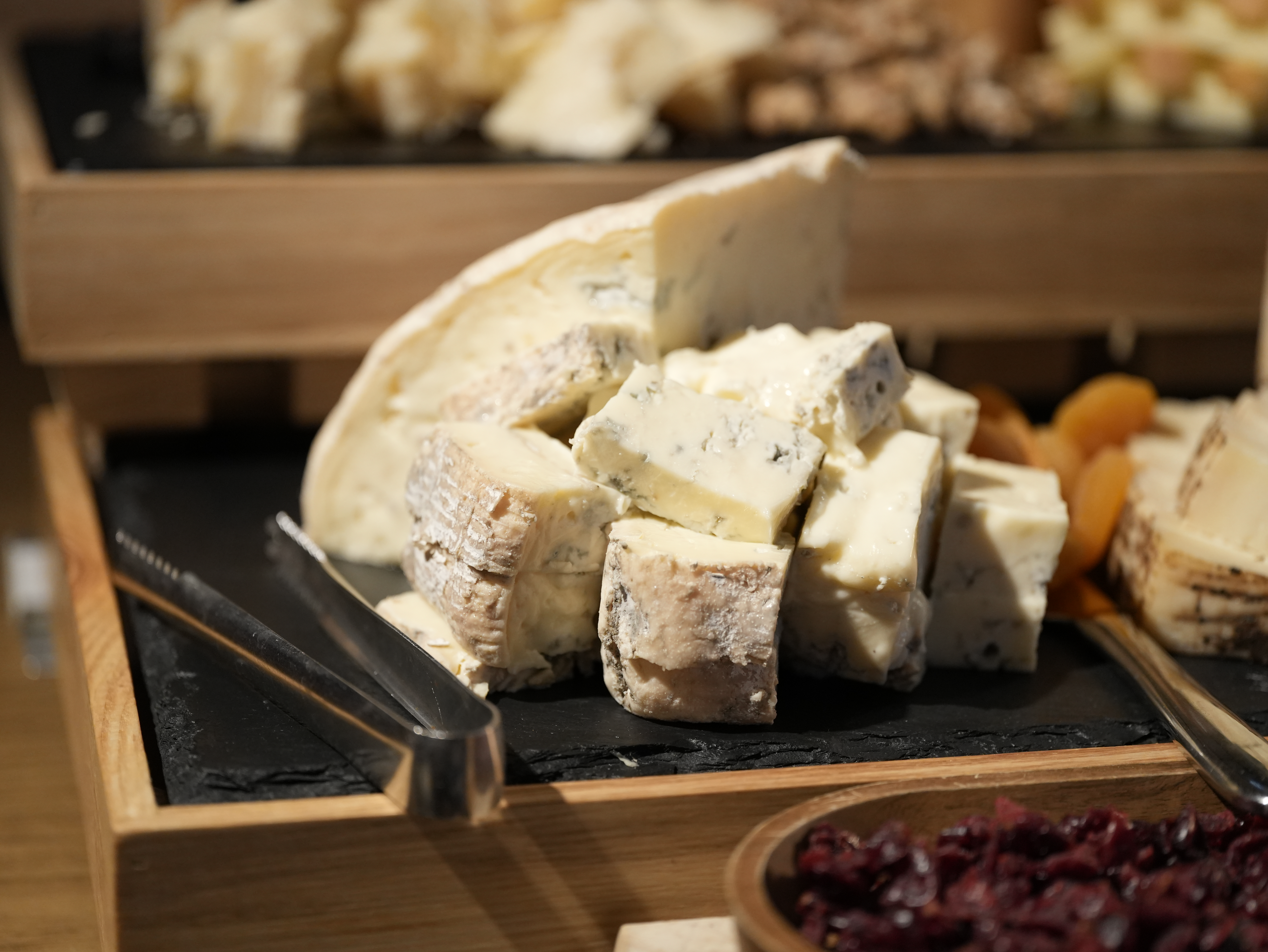
Gorgonzola cheese takes its name from the homonymous town near Milan.

Lombardy is one of the Italian regions with the greatest tradition of dairy products: Lombardy counts among its cheeses 14 DOP. products and 63 PAT, the highest number among the Italian regions.

One of the most famous and widespread cheese in the region is Grana Padano, produced in most of the region except for Valtellina and Como, it is one of the most famous and ancient hard paste Italian cheeses, used together with Parmigiano Reggiano, produced in the province of Mantua, as a condiment for first courses and fillings: both derive from Granone Lodigiano, the ancestor of all Italian Grana cheeses, whose origin is attributed to the monks of the Chiaravalle Abbey in the 12th century.

Another famous cheese from Lombardy, originally from Milan but nowadays produced in almost all the region, is Gorgonzola, a raw cheese in two versions: a "sweet" one, softer and creamier, and a "spicy" one, more compact and with a stronger taste. Other "panlombardi" cheeses are Taleggio, a soft cheese with raw paste coming from the homonymous valley, and Quartirolo Lombardo, whereas the last DOP denomination in order of time is Silter from Brescia.

Exclusively from the mountain areas, especially from Valtellina, are Casera and Bitto, cheeses with a semi-soft and soft texture that can be eaten alone, or used melted as a condiment over pizzoccheri from Valtellina, or as a real dish as in sciatt. Among other DOP cheeses from Lombardy we can mention Provolone Valpadana, Salva Cremasco, Strachitunt, Nostrano Valtrompia, Formai de Mut from Alta Valle Brembana and finally Formaggella del Luinese, the only DOP goat cheese from Lombardy.

Stracchino and robiola considered as cheese categories: belonging to the first group there are Stracchino Bronzone, Stracchino della Valsassina, Stracchino Orobico and Stracchino Tipico; belonging to the second group there are Robiola Bresciana and Robiola della Valsassina.

Other famous Lombard cheeses worthy of note are Agrì di Valtorta, Bagòss, Branzi, caprini Bergamaschi, Casatta di Corteno Golgi, Casolet, Rosa Camuna, Tombea, Semuda, Zincarlin and Mascarpone, eaten alone or used as a base element for the cream used to accompany panettone.

=== Cold cuts ===
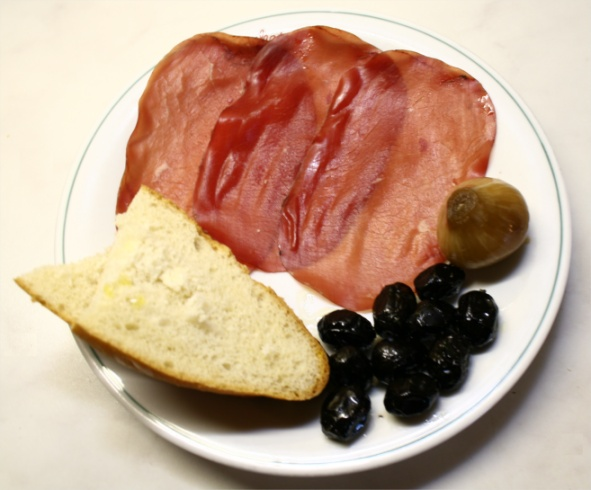
Bresaola served with bread, olives and onions

The historical spreading of breeding in Lombardy has given the region a wide tradition of cold cuts and sausages. Among DOP and IGP products, there are three types of pork salami: Brianza salami, produced in the hills between Lecco and Milan, Varzi salami, produced in the Oltrepò pavese with pork meat, pepper and wine, and Cremona salami. More particular is the goose salami from Mortara, in the land of Lomellina where the use of goose in cooking is very common.

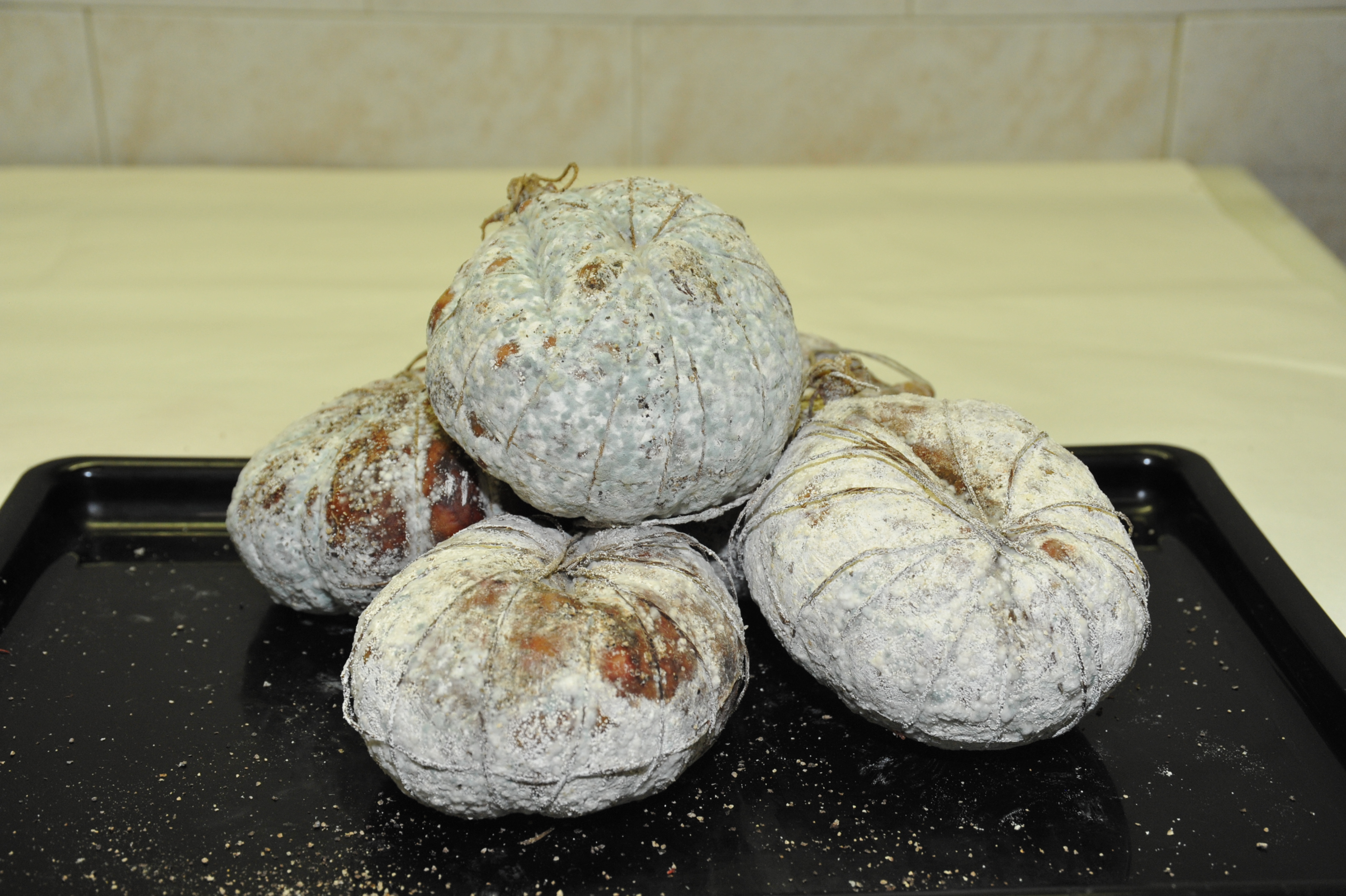
Liver Mortadella with vin brulé

Every province has at least one typical salami, among which the most famous are Milano salami, Casalin mantovano, and bastardei from Valchiavenna. Also from Valtellina territory are bresaola, obtained from the seasoning of beef meat and that can be smoked or not, and slinzega.

As far as hams are concerned, we can mention prosciutto mantovano, with its sweet taste, prosciutto crudo delle Orobie, prosciutto al pepe della Valtellina, and prosciutto d'oca stagionato della Lomellina. Besides mortadella produced in the whole region, there is also the Vin Brulé liver mortadella, originally from the mountains between Lecco and Valtellina.

=== Bread ===
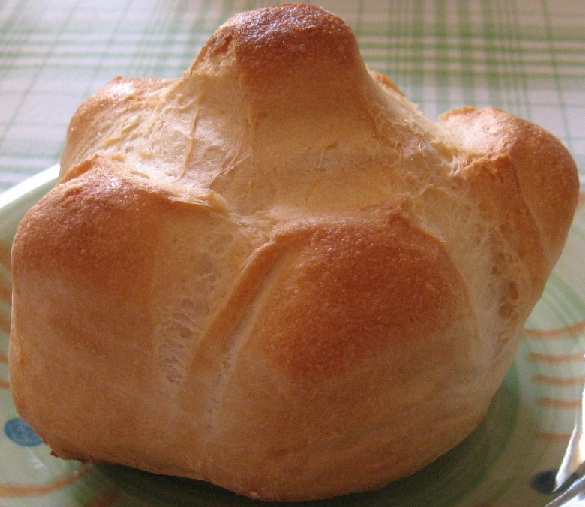
Michetta bread

Typical and common bread in Milan, but also in the rest of western Lombardy, is the rosetta, locally called michetta, blown bread (almost empty inside) and with a "turtle shell" shape derived from the mold used to make the dough, traditionally consumed with cold cuts, especially with mortadella, it was the symbol snack of magut (bricklayers) and workers for its rusticity and low cost.

Typical of Pavia area are instead the hard bread, whose dough must be prepared in three different moments at a distance of some hours, and the rice bread, common in Lomellina, a land where the cultivation of rice is strongly spread. Similarly, given the wide diffusion of maize in the Lombardy plain, in the lower Lombardy area it is possible to find yellow bread, prepared with maize flour.

Typical of Valtellina is rye bread, a doughnut shaped bread created with the addition of rye flour, whereas originating from Livigno is pan carcent, a doughnut shaped bread with turnips added in the dough, and pan da cool, loaves of bread with colostrum added in the dough.

Recently elected as typical bread of Bergamo is the Garibalda, a loaf of bread made of a mixture of semolina flour, whole wheat flour, buckwheat flour and corn flour. Typical of the city of Virgilio is pane mantovano or mantovanina, a hard dough bread created by rolling up the dough, which will create the typical curls at the ends of the bread once it is baked.

=== Wine ===
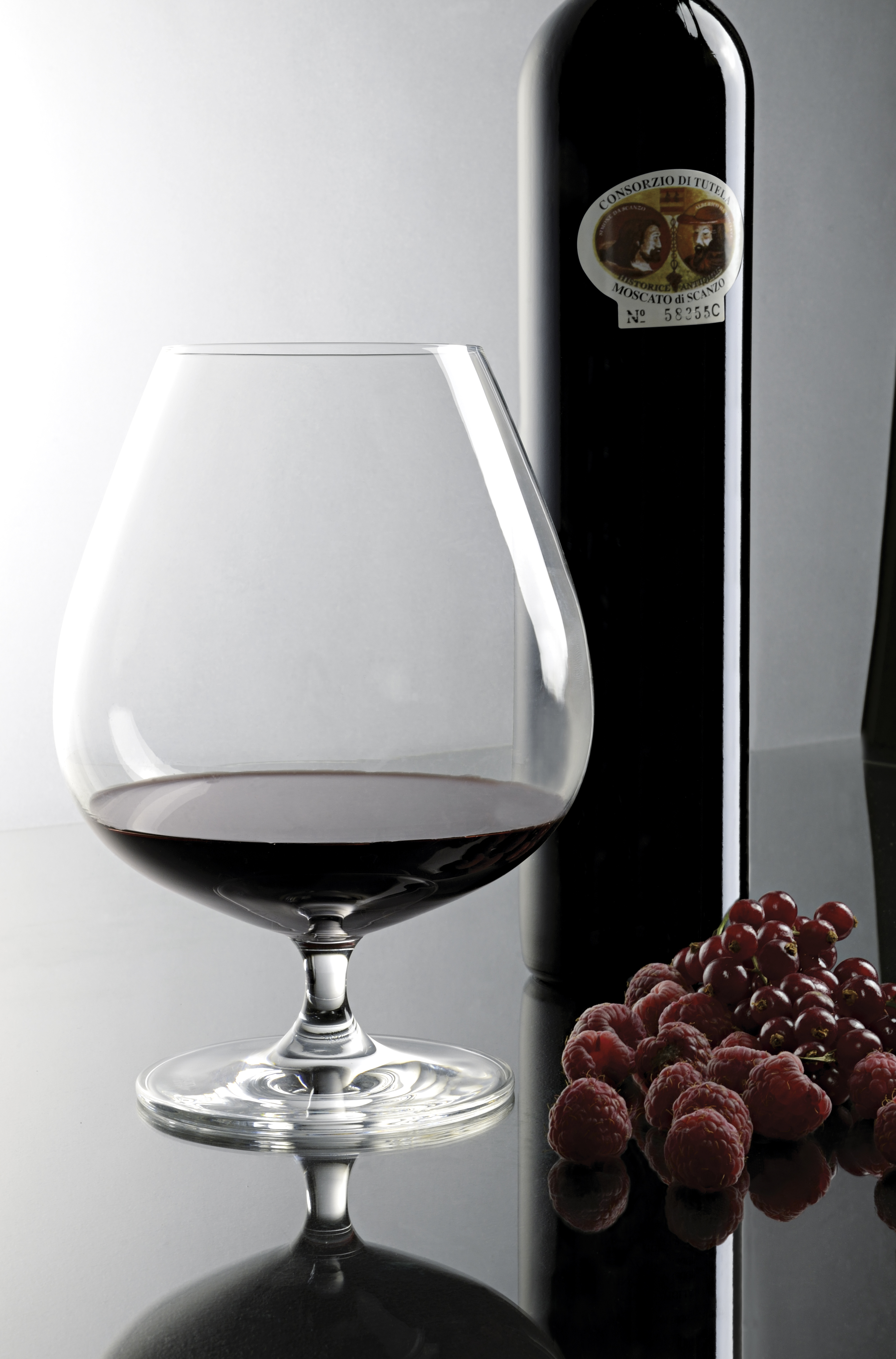
Moscato di Scanzo DOCG

The cultivation of vine dates back to Neolithic times, as witnessed by the finding of grape seeds in archaeological sites of the same period, however the first reliable sources about the production of wine date back to the first century BC, in which are described the wines of Oltrepò Pavese and the "Rhaetian wines" produced in the area of lake Como.

Lombard provinces boast 5 DOCG, 22 DOC and 15 IGT: 60% of the regional wine production falls under DOC and DOCG appellation, that is about the double of the national average.

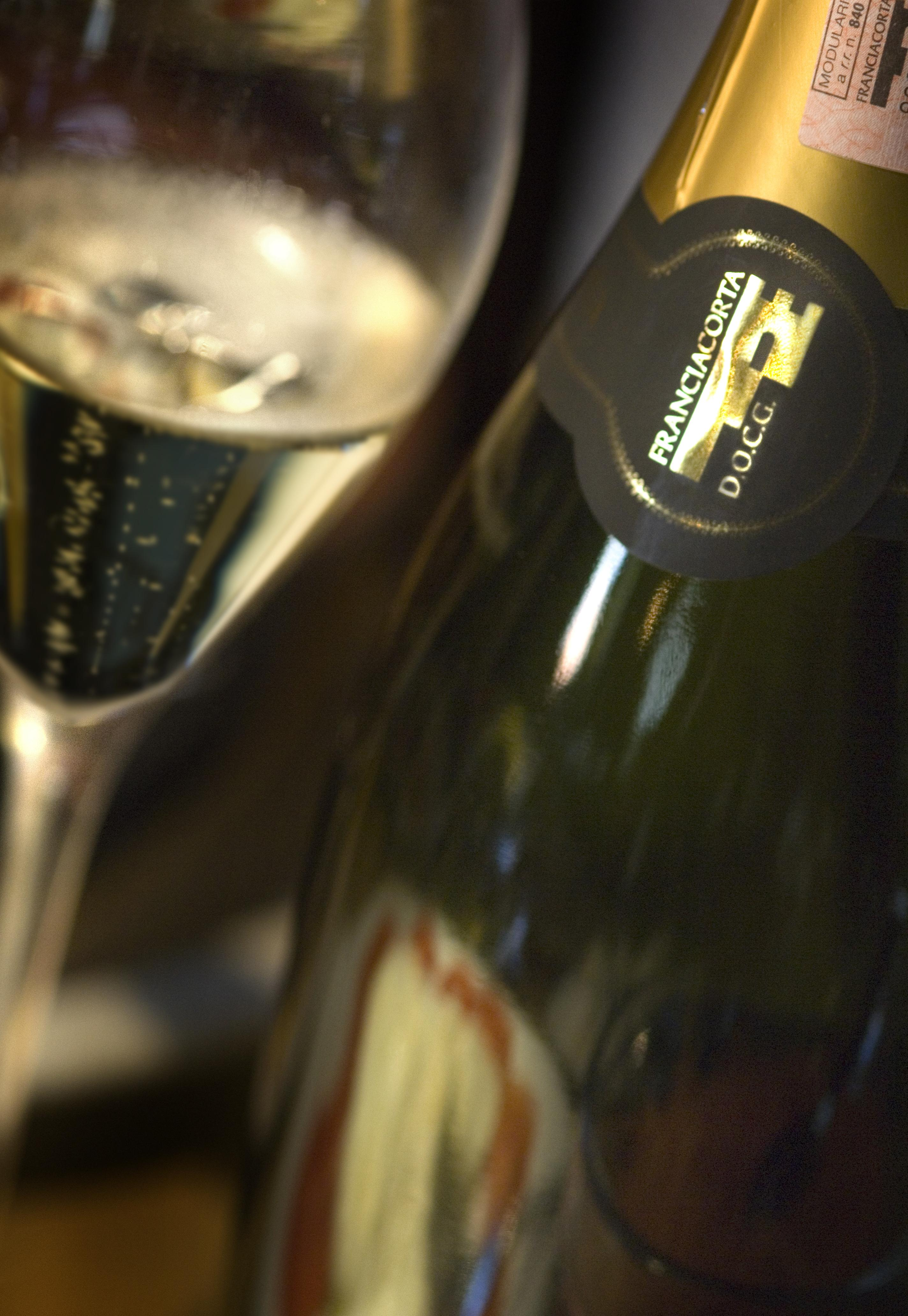
Bottle and glass of Franciacorta DOCG

The most renowned wine production areas are Oltrepò Pavese, in the province of Pavia, Franciacorta, a hilly area south from lake Iseo, the morainic area around Lake Garda, and Valtellina, where wines are cultivated on the typical terraces which allow the cultivation on very steep mountainous terrains and a higher insolation to vineyards.

The 5 Lombardy DOCG denominations are:

- Franciacorta, sparkling wine made from chardonnay and pinot grapes, in white and rose versions.
- Valtellina superiore, obtained by Nebbiolo grapes cultivated in the northern side of Valtellina in the typical terraces, which together with the characteristics of the soil allow a higher insolation in order to compensate the harshness of climate. It is a full bodied wine with a strong taste to be consumed with meat dishes.
- Sforzato di Valtellina, also obtained by Nebbiolo grapes left to dry beyond the normal harvesting period in order to naturally increase the sugar content of the fruit. The result is a rare example of very structured dry "passito", to be consumed with important meat dishes such as stews and braised meat.
- Oltrepò Pavese metodo classico, sparkling wine made with Pinot produced in the province of Pavia in white and rose versions.
- Moscato di Scanzo, raisin wine obtained with a method similar to the Sforzato di Valtellina in the hilly lands with high slope, to be consumed with chocolate and cheese. It is produced exclusively in the commune of Scanzorosciate in the province of Bergamo.

Famous DOC wines of the region are Buttafuoco, Bonarda and Sangue di Giuda, sweet red wine not passito, from Oltrepò Pavese, Curtefranca and Cellatica, from Franciacorta, Valtenesi, Garda Bresciano and Lugana from the Garda area, Rosso di Valtellina, and Lambrusco Mantovano.

Lastly, it is worth mentioning the wines of the province of Bergamo, such as Terre del Colleoni and Valcalepio; IGT wines of Terre Lariane, produced in some areas of the provinces of Lecco and Como, and the only DOC wine produced in the province of Milan, San Colombano.

In the hills of Brianza, especially in the Lecco area, there are still many big knobs producing wines such as Pincianel and Nustranel.

Until the second half of the nineteenth century, Alto Milanese was also a wine area. The history of viticulture in the Alto Milanese area has its roots in Roman times. In this area were once produced some renowned wines, among which Colli di Sant'Erasmo, Santana and Clintù.

=== Olive oil ===
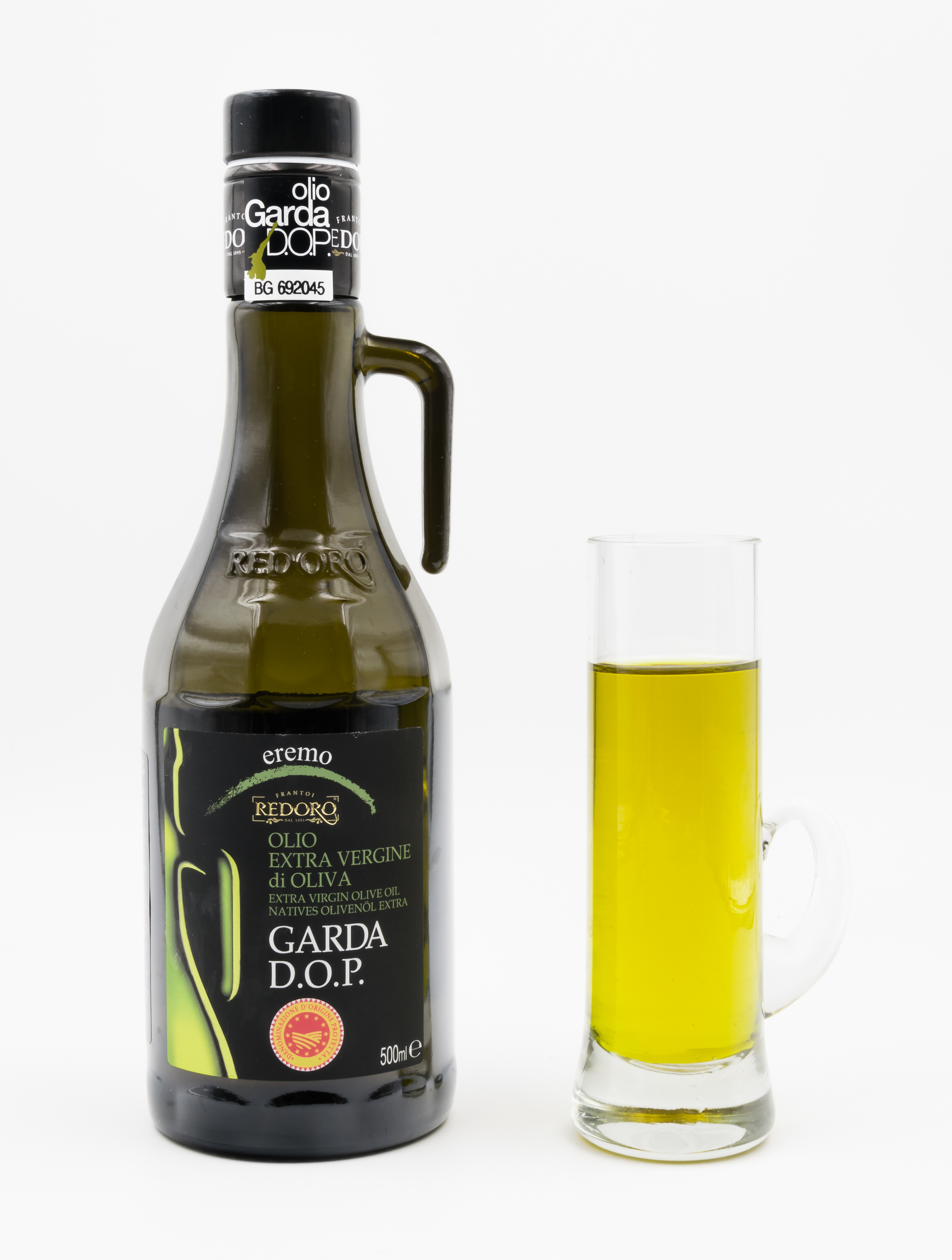
Garda DOP olive virgin oil

Although Lombardy is outside the tradition of cultivation, the cultivation of olive trees and the production of olive oil is attested since the Middle Ages on the lakes of Lombardy, where the effect of large water basins mitigates the climate and protects plants from the high temperature changes typical of the rest of the region: overall in the region there are more than 1,600 hectares of land planted with olive trees, most of them dedicated to the production of olives for mills.

The territory of Lombardy has two protected designations of origin:

- Laghi Lombardi DOP Extra Virgin Olive Oil, in its two subzones Lario, produced on Lake Como, and Sebino, produced on Lake Iseo
- Garda DOP Extra Virgin Olive Oil, in its subzone Bresciano

Both productions present in general a low productivity with oils of low acidity, delicate flavor and particularly valuable.

== Alcoholic drinks ==
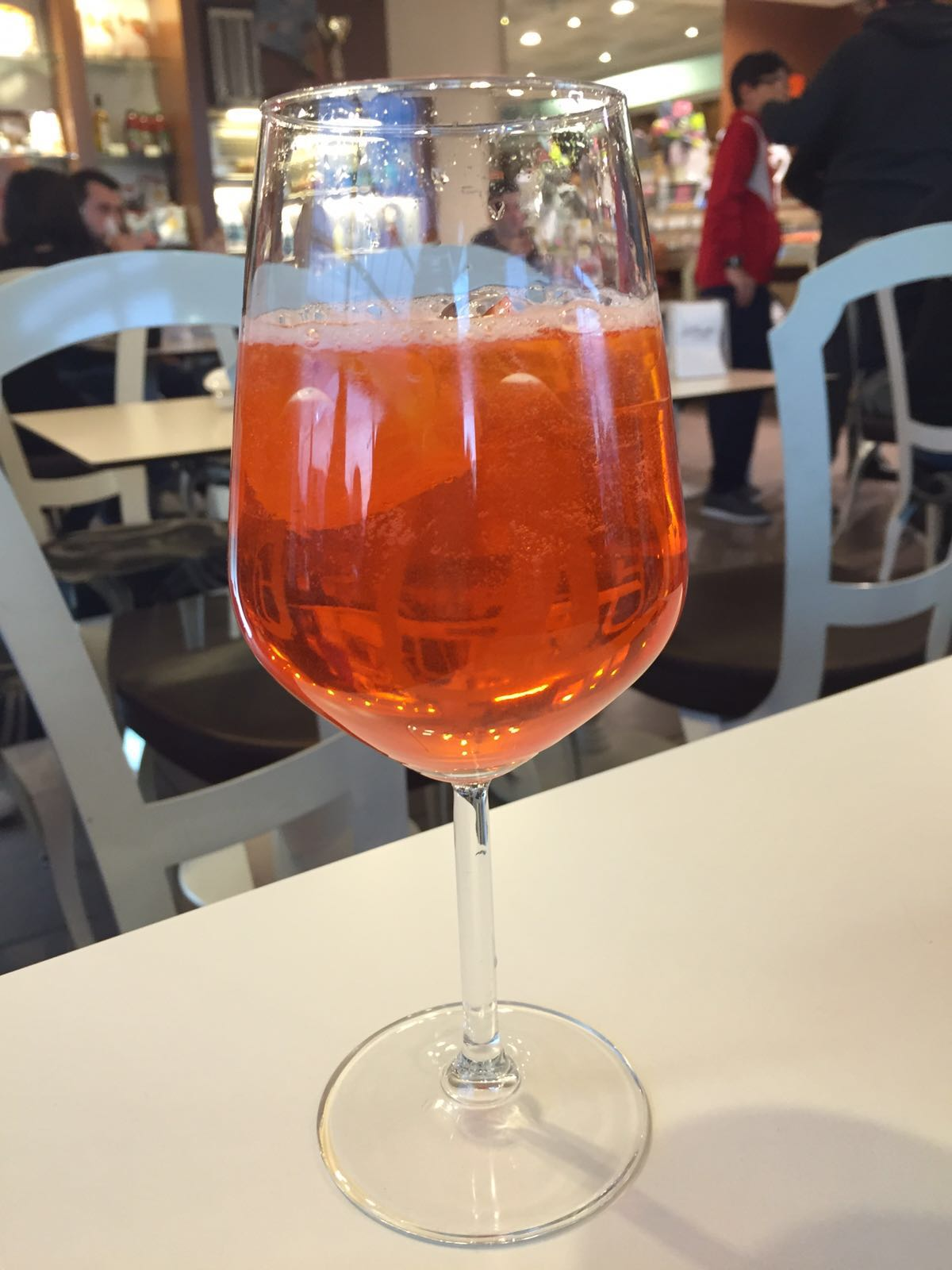
A pirlo, aperitif of Brescian origin

Widespread in all wine territories is the production of grappa, especially in the province of Brescia and in the province of Sondrio: in particular Valchiavenna was, before the opening of the Sempione tunnel, one of the most famous places of grappa production in Italy.

The local grappa producers (grapat de la Val di Giust) were forced to emigrate because of the crisis in Valchiavenna, deprived of its historical traffic of people and goods due to competition from the Simplon Pass: some of the main families of grappa producers in all of northern Italy originate from Valchiavenna, including the Ghelfi, the Vener, the Levi and the Francoli families. Distilled differently from grappa are imperial drops, a distillate of herbs produced by the monks of the Certosa di Pavia.

As for typical liqueurs, the most renowned ones are Braulio, a liqueur from Valtellina obtained by the infusion of mountain herbs, amaretto liqueur, made of almonds and herbs whose origins date back to the sixteenth century, and Fernet-Branca, a liqueur with a characteristic bitter taste produced in the centre of Milan in the original factory, at the time of its foundation at the outskirts of the city. Other liqueurs are Vespetrò from Canzo, made of coriander, anise and orange peel, Ramazzotti bitters created in a store in the center of Milan by the pharmacist of the same name, Acqua di tutto cedro, produced in Salò, and nocino.

Remaining distillates and liquors of big industrial groups are: the Campari group, creator of Aperol, Illva of Saronno, for the production of Zucca rhubarb as well as amaretto, and Distillerie Fratelli Branca.

A famous Lombard aperitif is pirlo, which is made of still white wine and Campari. It has origins in Brescia and it is similar in concept to the more known spritz, which has origins in Veneto. The fashion of happy hour has also introduced for pirlo the use of Aperol (much less alcoholic and complex) instead of Campari. Pirlo is served in a glass with a high stem and a typical balloon shape.

== See also ==
- Italian cuisine
- Cuisine of Abruzzo
- Apulian cuisine
- Arbëreshë cuisine
- Emilian cuisine
- Cuisine of Liguria
- Cuisine of Mantua
- Cuisine of Basilicata
- Neapolitan cuisine
- Piedmontese cuisine
- Roman cuisine
- Cuisine of Sardinia
- Sicilian cuisine
- Tuscan cuisine
- Venetian cuisine

== Bibliography ==
- Agnoletto, Attilio (1992). San Giorgio su Legnano - storia, società, ambiente.
- Daniela Guaiti (2010). Lombardia. La grande cucina regionale italiana. Verona: Gribaudo.
- Piras, Claudia; Medagliani, Eugenio (2000). Culinaria Italy. Könemann Verlagsgesellschaft mbh. ISBN 3-8290-2901-2.
- "Per un codice della cucina lombarda" (PDF). Regione Lombardia.
- "Atlante dei prodotti tipici e tradizionali" (PDF). Regione Lombardia.
- Gastronomia, vol. 5, 1982, OCLC 163181971.

== Other projects ==
- Wikibooks contiene ricette della cucina lombarda
