= Vespetrò =

Liqueur of Lombardy, northern Italy

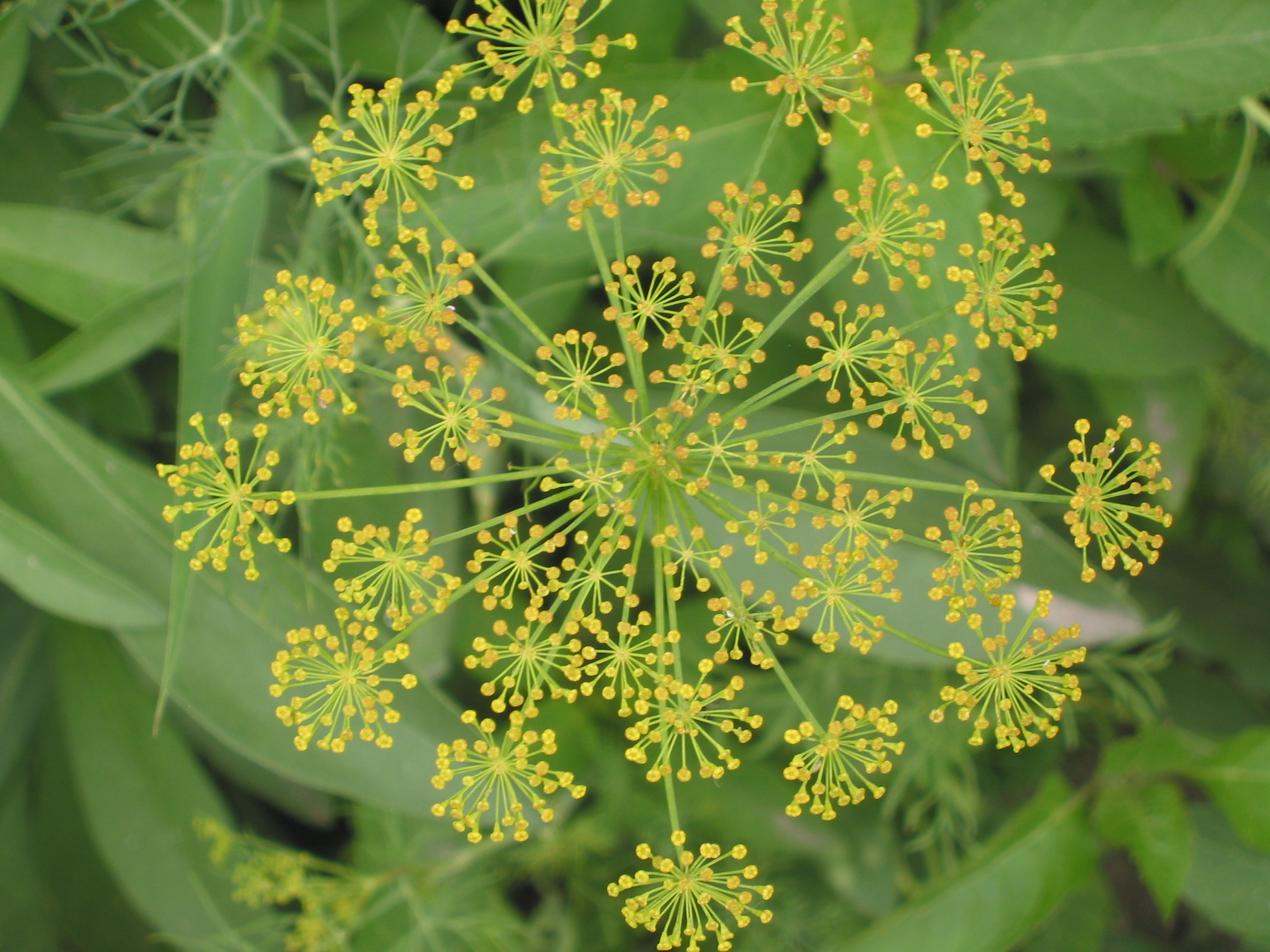
Typical shape of Umbrelliferae family of plants, some of which are used in the preparation of Vespetrò.

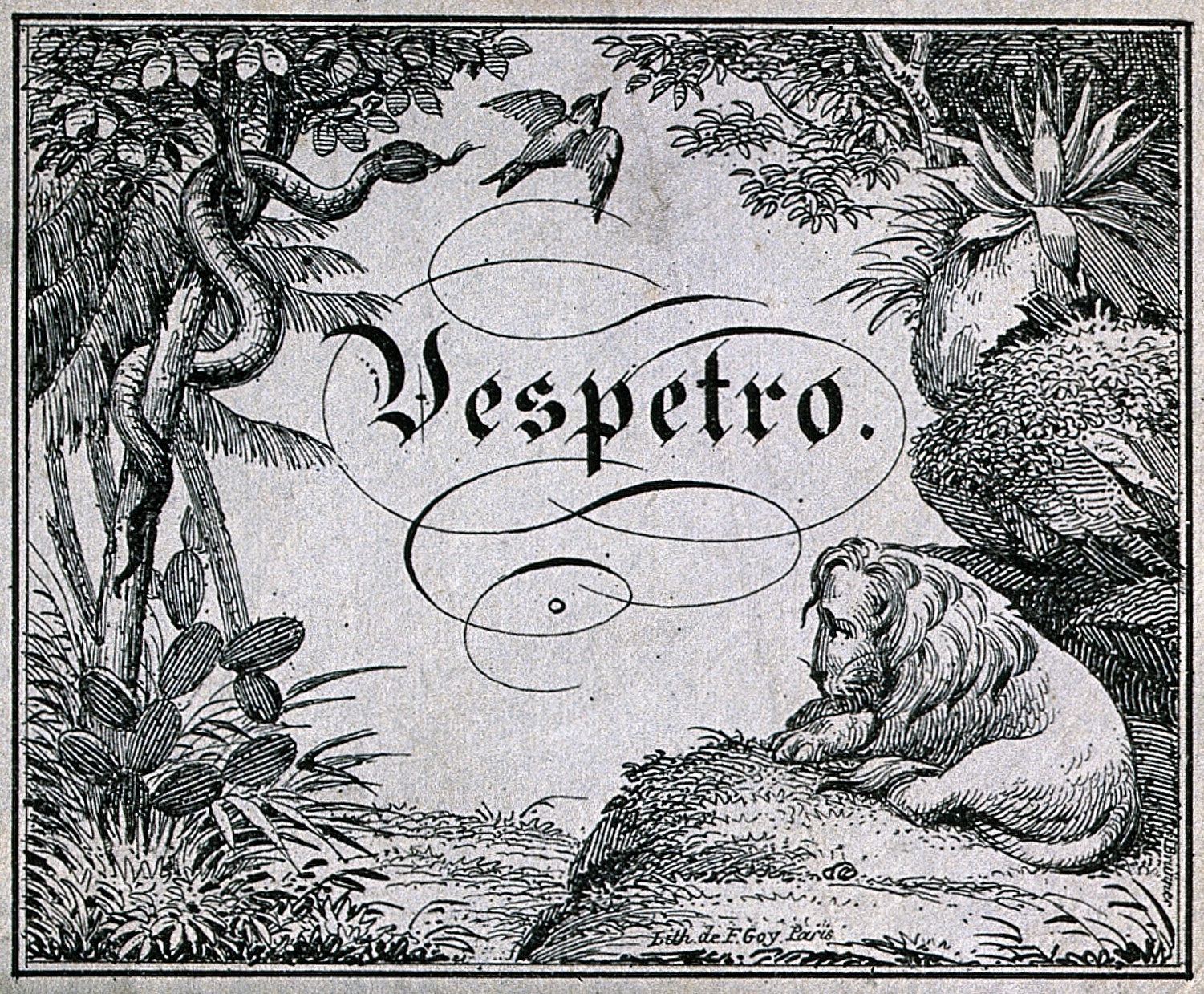

Vespetrò is a Lombard liqueur from Canzo. Its main ingredients are spices and medicinal plants. It is marketed with the brand Vespetrò Scannagatta and produced – as a homemade product – also by some families in Canzo, who hand down the recipe from generation to generation.

== History ==
The recipe of Vespetrò, of Savoyard origin, has been present in Canzo at least since 18th century and was appreciated by tourists as a speciality of the town.

The Raisonné de la distillation of 1778 called the Vespetrò a trendy drink also used to release intestinal gas.

During the 19th century, a Canzese pharmacist, Scannagatta, perfected the traditional recipe of the town, patented it and began to market it. The brand Vespetrò Scannagatta was awarded during the 1900 Paris World's fair and was appreciated by the 20th century's tourists, coming in Canzo and surroundings, in its yellow and elongated bottle.

After a stop in the years 1992–2007, the selling restarted. Scannagatta exact recipe remains secret, and also every producing family of Canzo treasures its own version, with slight variations in the method of producing and in the proportion of ingredients.

== Description ==
The taste is sweet and anise-like. The grade is about 40% abv.

The word "Vespetro" comes from "Vesser, péter, roter" (French for swallow, fart, burp) which are the main digestive effects caused by its consumption. It may also simply derive from "vesper" (Italian for evening) in reference to the beverage drunk at night after diner.

== See also ==
- Lombard cuisine
- Canzo – Cuisine
- Canzo – Culture

== Bibliography ==
- Karl Baedeker, L’Italie: Manuel du voyageur. Première partie: l’Italie septentrionale, 1865
