= Veneziana =

Italian sweet pastry

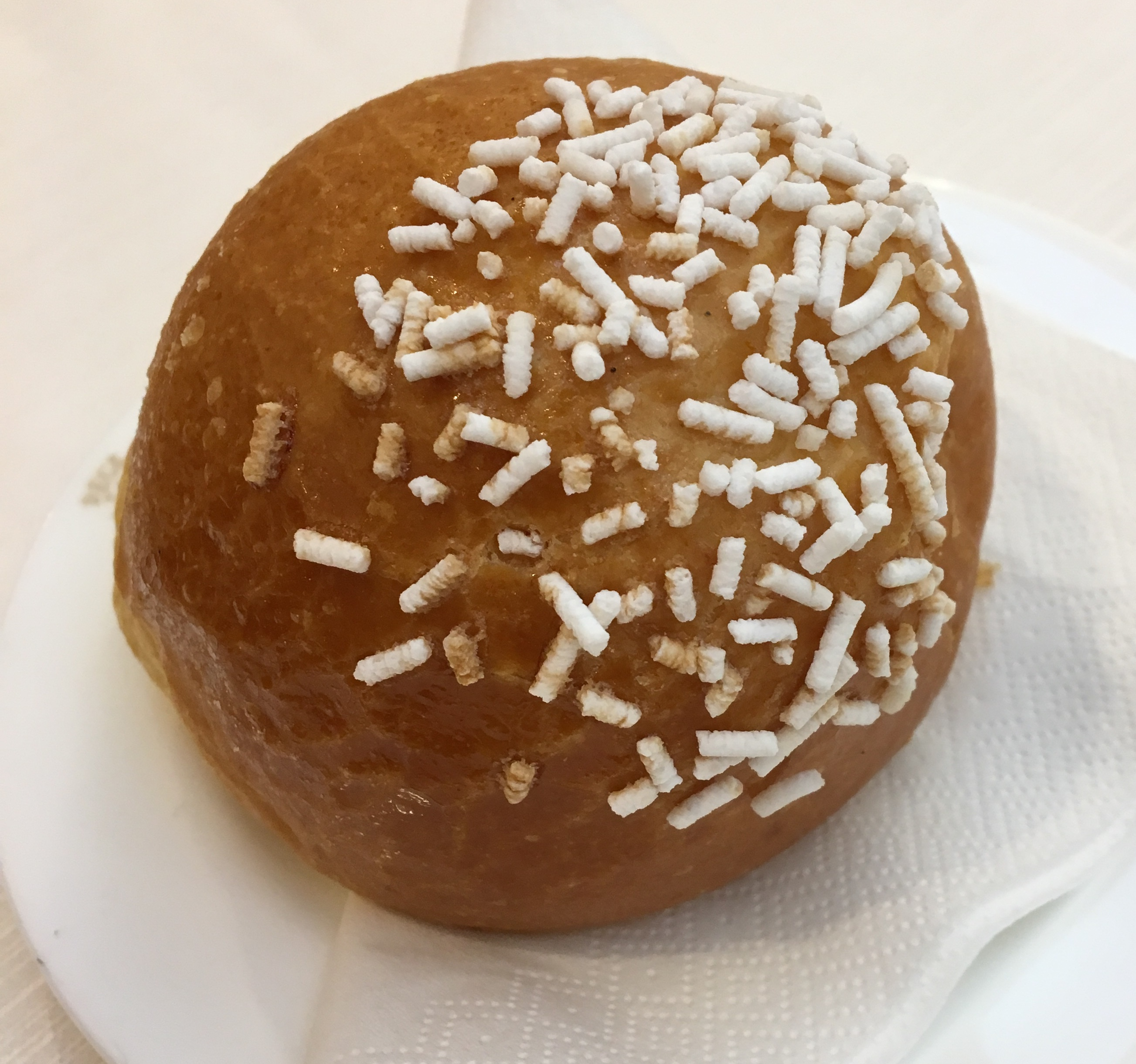
- Type: Dessert
- Place of origin: Italy
- Region or state: Lombardy
- Main ingredients: Flour, butter, sugar
- Variations: Big version with candied fruits, small version can be filled with custard; covered with plain sugar or icing

Veneziana is a sweet from the Lombard cuisine covered with sugar grains or almond icing. It is served in two versions: the bigger one is consumed during Christmas, like panettone; the smaller one is eaten as breakfast, along with cappuccino, like croissants. Veneziana is butter and flour-based and uses sourdough as leavening; the smaller version is usually plain, sometimes filled with custard, while the bigger version contains candied orange.

The history of veneziana is very similar to that of the panettone, which was created around 15th century. This sweet was once eaten during celebrations such as weddings and Christmas, while since the end of Second World War is considered a breakfast food. Buondì, a popular snack in Italy, is the industrial version of veneziana.

== See also ==
- List of Italian desserts and pastries
