= Pan meino =

Lombard dessert

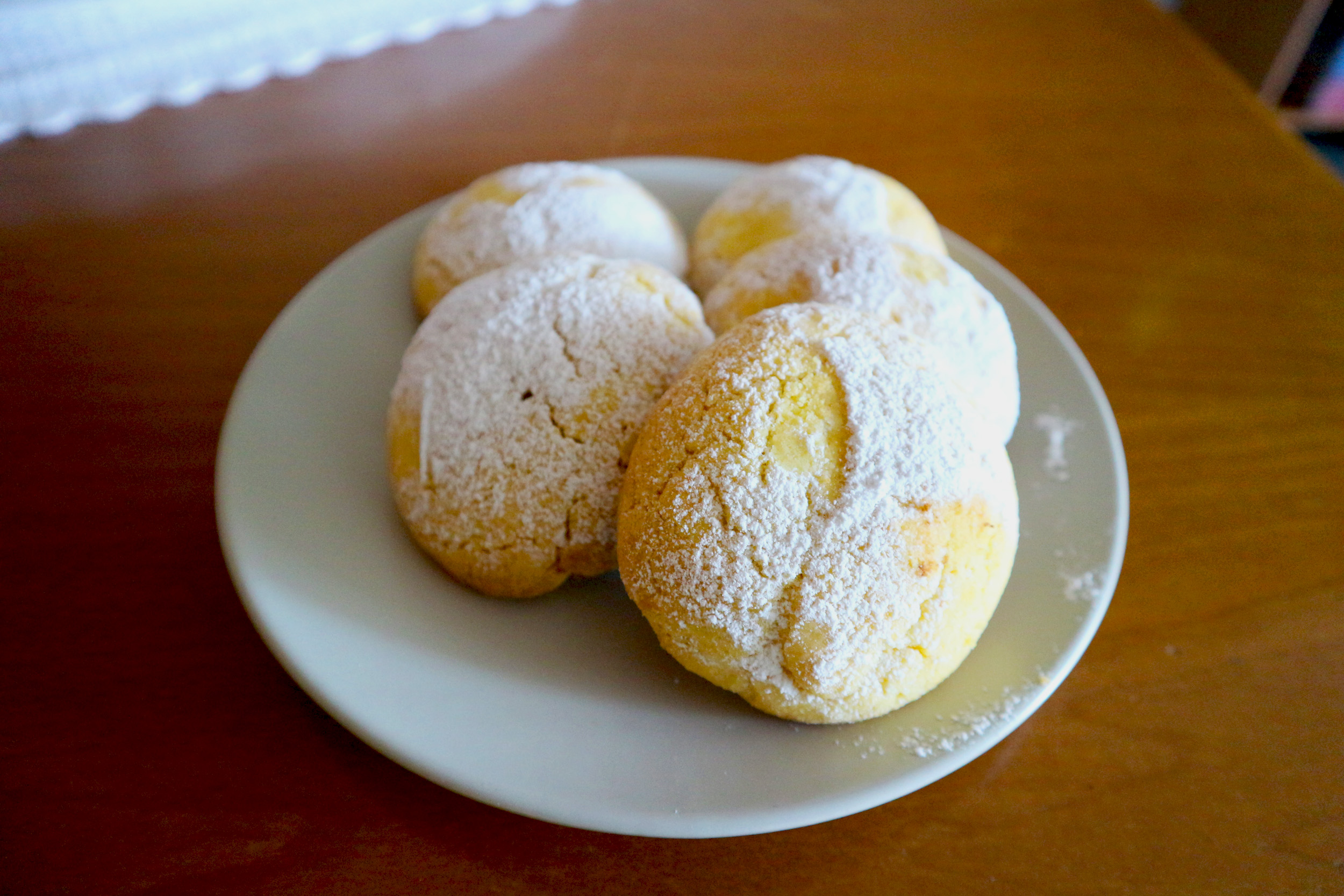
- Place of origin: Italy
- Region or state: Lombardy

Pan meino (or pan de mej in Lombard) is a typical Lombard dessert, especially widespread in the provinces of Milan, Monza, Lodi, Lecco, and Como.

It is a small sweet flatbread flavored with elderflower.

== History and ingredients ==
There are two legends regarding the invention of pan meino: the first says that pan meino was invented in the first half of the 14th century by the inhabitants of the Milanese countryside to celebrate the defeat against the brigands, then present throughout the territory, by Luchino Visconti.

The second describes pan meino as the accompaniment to the cups of cream once offered by milkmen on the day of Saint George, their patron, April 23, the day on which pan meino is traditionally prepared currently. The recipe for pan meino calls for flour mixed with eggs, milk, cream, butter, sugar, and elderflower. The mixture is given a flattened circular shape to then move on to baking.

== See also ==
- Lombard cuisine
- List of Italian desserts and pastries
- Saint George
