= Torta paesana =

Cake from Lombardy, Italy

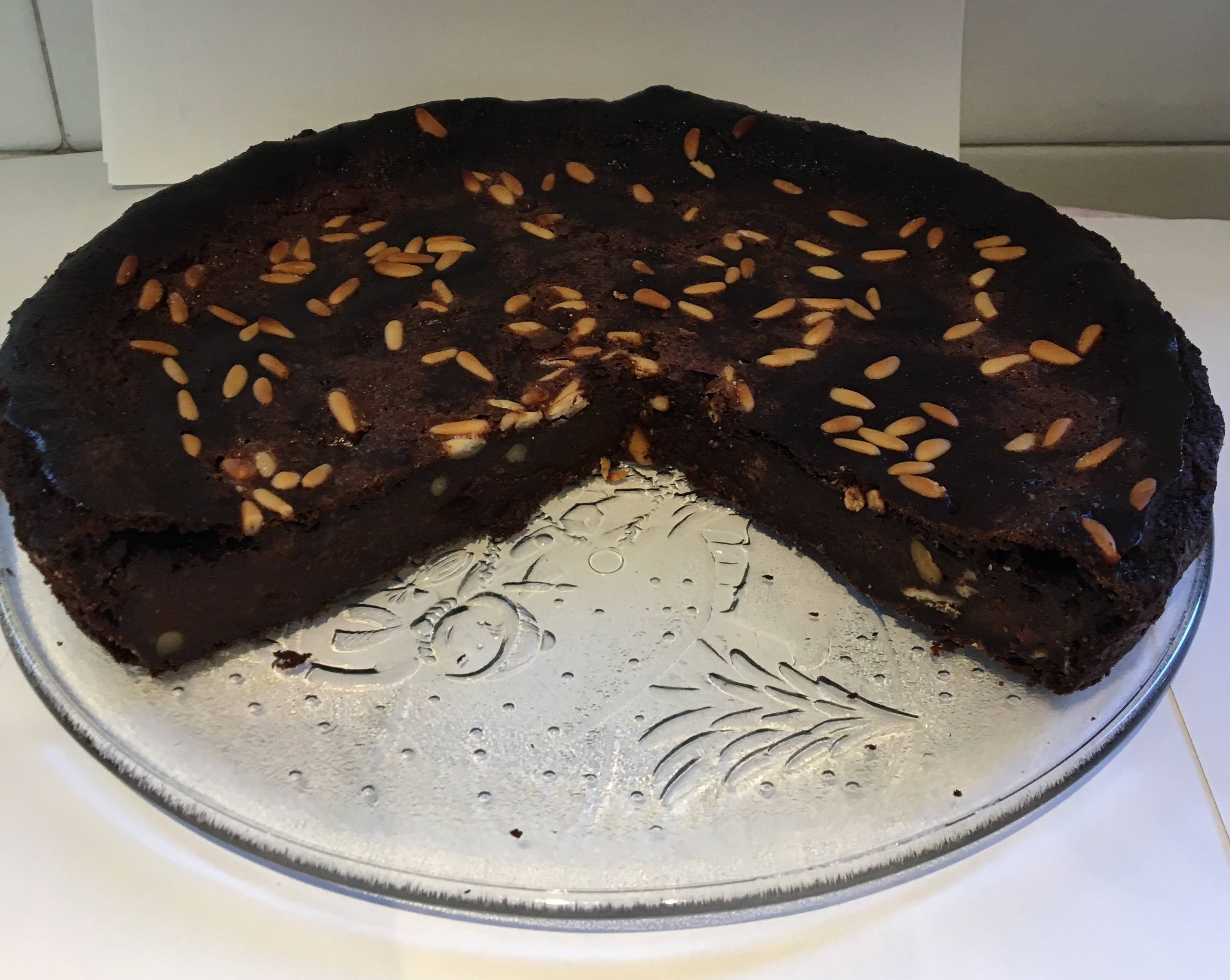
- Alternative names: Black cake, milk cake, bread cake, torta papina, torta paciarella, michelacc
- Type: Dessert
- Place of origin: Italy
- Region or state: Brianza
- Main ingredients: Bread, milk, cocoa, biscuits, amaretti di Saronno, sugar, pine seeds, raisins, candied orange and citron, anise
- Variations: Anisette, rum, butter, eggs

Torta paesana (lit. 'village cake'), also known in English as black cake, milk cake or bread cake, is a cake of the Lombard cuisine, notably from Brianza. Its main ingredients are stale bread, milk and cocoa, often enriched with biscuits, amaretti di Saronno, sugar, pine seeds, raisins, candied orange and citron and aromatized with anise. As a traditional cake, without a codified recipe, it presents a great number of variants. It is homemade or sold in bakeries during autumn, for city festivals or religious celebrations.

== See also ==
- List of Italian desserts and pastries
- List of cakes
