= Valtellina Casera =

Italian cheese

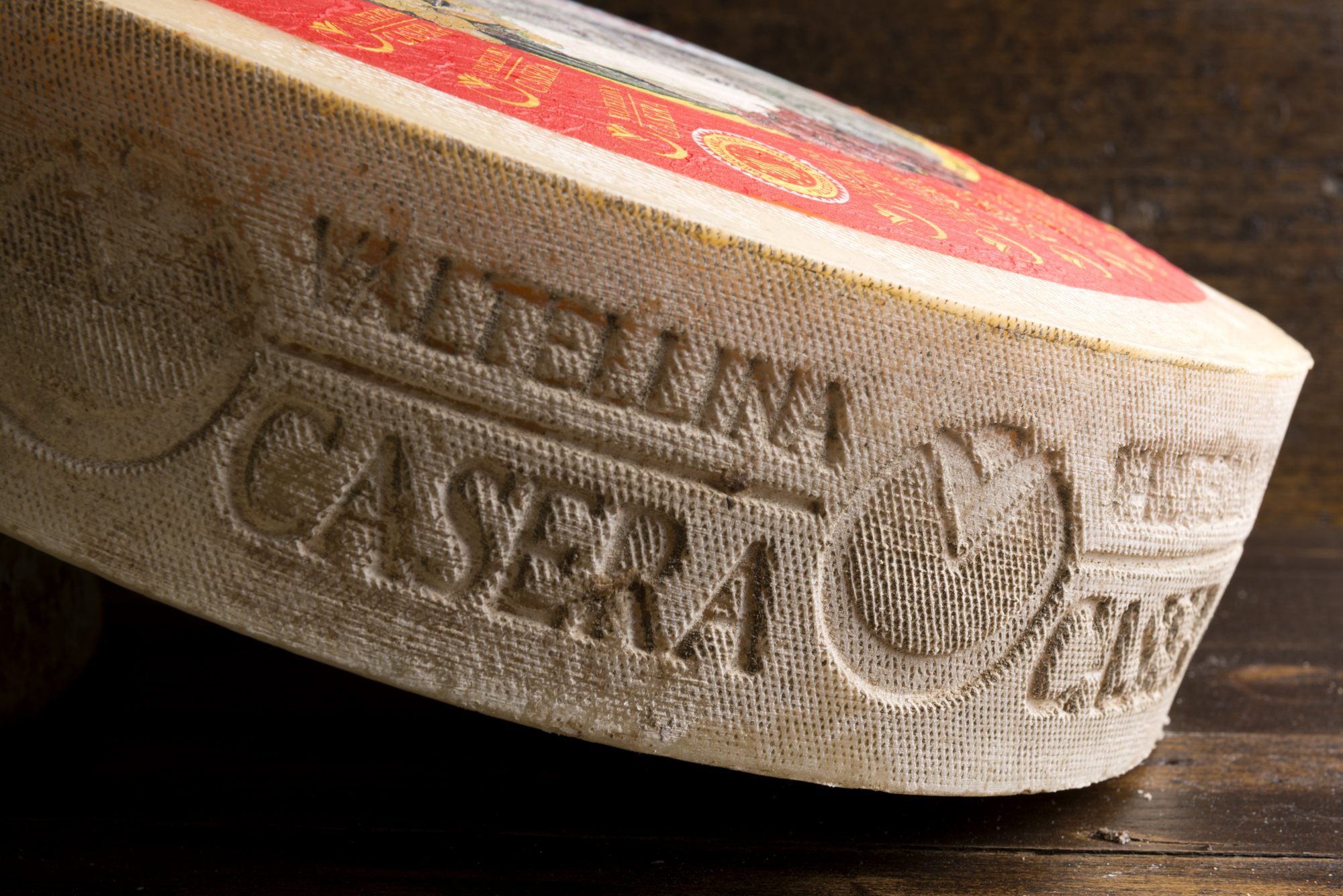
- Country of origin: Italy
- Region: Province of Sondrio, Lombardy
- Source of milk: Cows' milk
- Certification: European Union: protected designation of origin (PDO) 1996 (Reg. CE n.1263/96)
- Named after: Valtellina, casera[*]

Valtellina Casera (Lombard: Casera de la Valtolina) is a cheese made from semi-skimmed cows' milk in the northern Italian province of Sondrio. Its origins date back to the sixteenth century and it is much used in the cuisine of the Valtellina valley: particularly in dishes based on buckwheat flour such as pizzoccheri and sciatt (toad(s) in Lombard language).

It has had protected designation of origin (PDO) status under European Union law since 1996; its production is managed by the Consorzio Tutela Formaggi Valtellina Casera e Bitto and certification is regulated by CSQA of Thiene.
