= Pizzoccheri =

Type of pasta

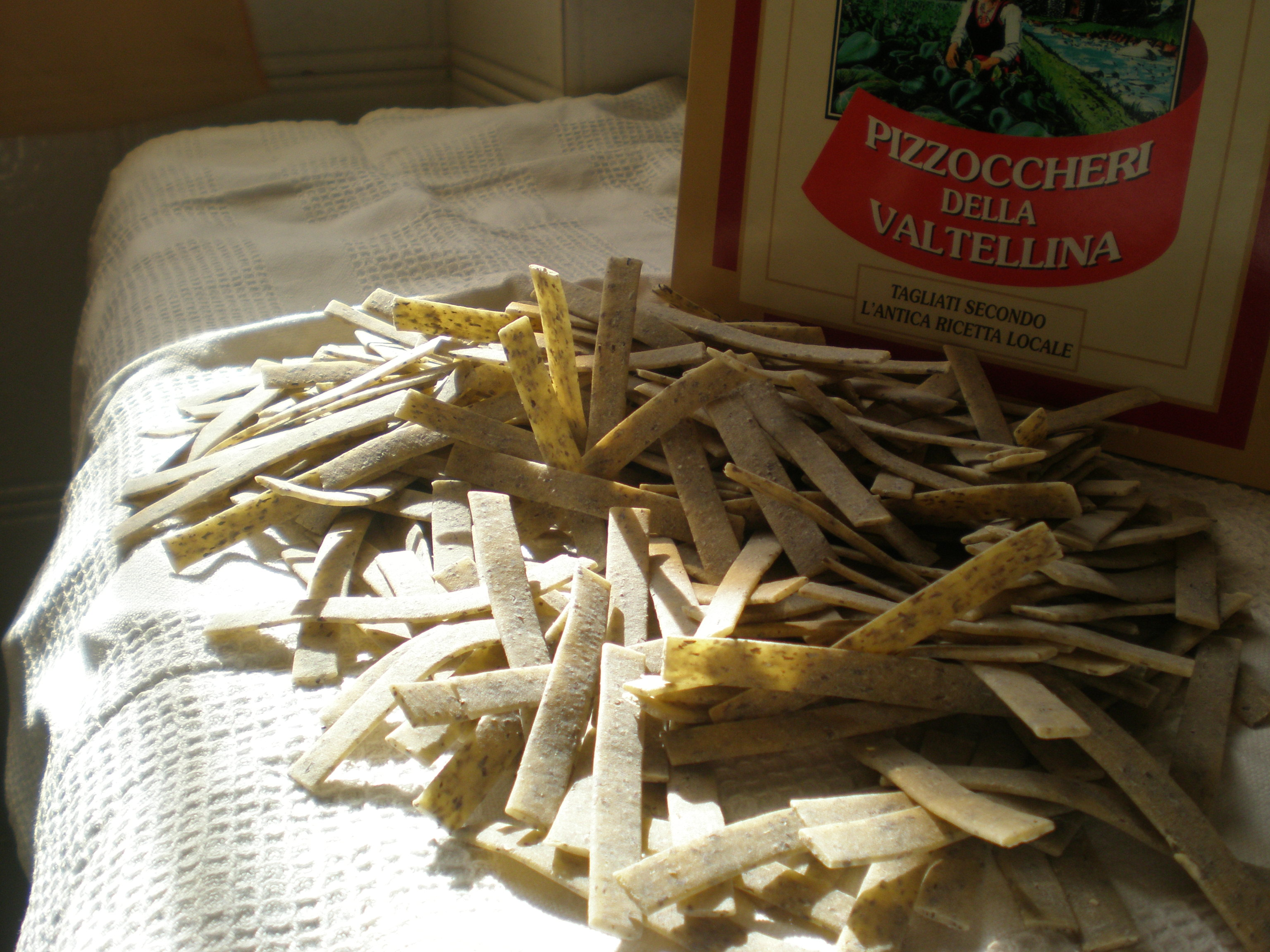
- Type: Pasta
- Place of origin: Italy
- Region or state: Valtellina
- Main ingredients: Buckwheat, wheat flour, water
- Variations: Pizzoccheri della Valtellina, pizzoccheri bianchi della Valchiavenna

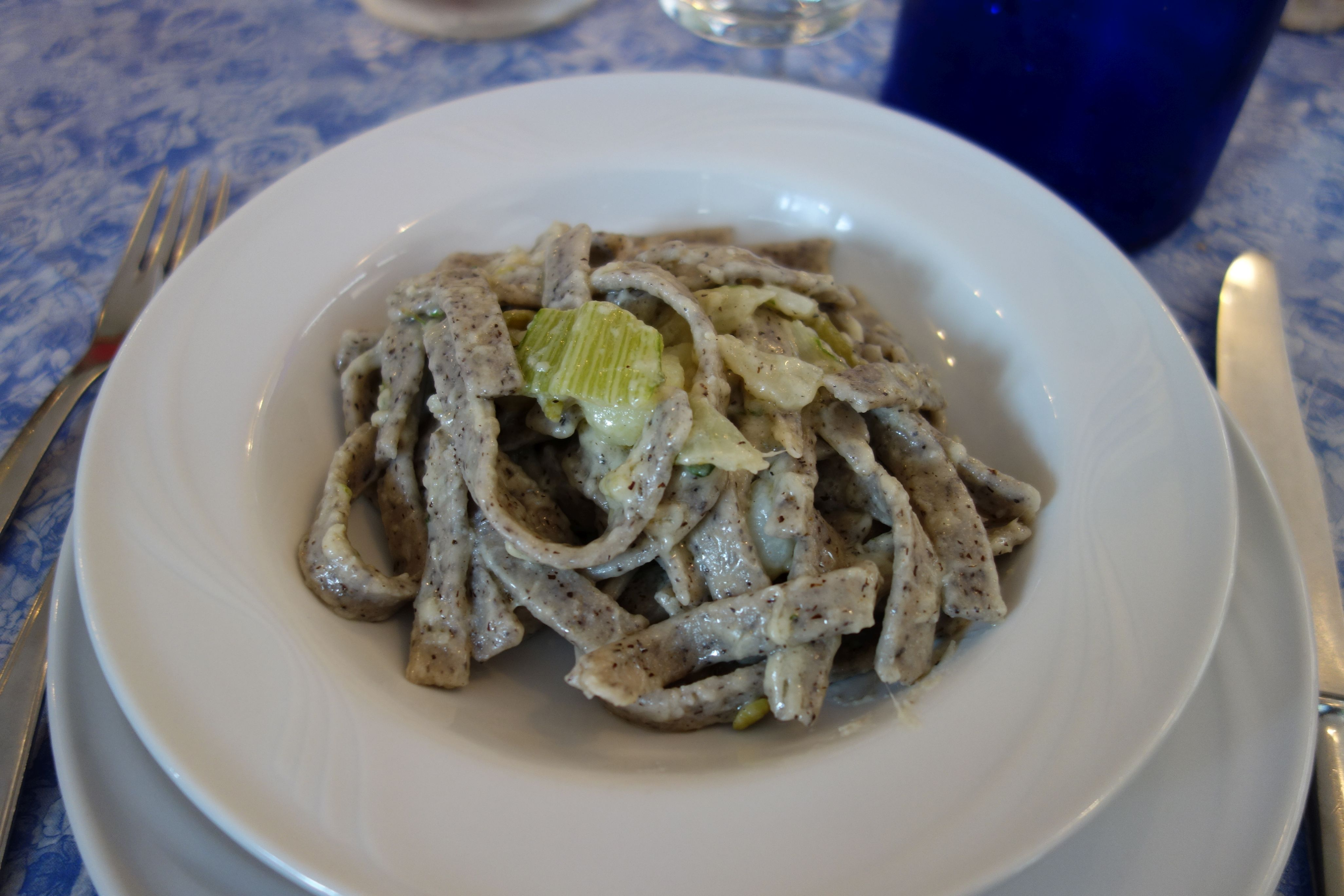
A dish of pizzoccheri

Pizzoccheri (Italian: [pitˈtsɔkkeri]; Lombard: pizzòcher, pronounced [piˈtsɔker, -kar]) is a flat ribbon pasta, made with a blend of buckwheat flour and wheat flour. It is believed to have originated in Valtellina, a valley in the northern Italian region of Lombardy. It is also popular in Val Poschiavo, a side valley of Valtellina which belongs to the Swiss canton of Grisons.

Pizzoccheri can be made by hand or can be purchased pre-made.

== History ==
The dish was first identified in 1550, in the Category of Inventories of Things that May be Eaten in Italy by Ortensio Lando.

In the 1799 book Die Republik Graubündent (The Republic of Graubünden), German historian Heinrich L. Lehmann wrote about a "perzockel" dough made from buckwheat flour and egg.

== In popular culture ==
Two pizzoccheri fairs (or sagre) take place in Teglio: La Sagra dei Pizzoccheri, celebrated annually in July, and the festival of The Golden Pizzocchero, celebrated annually in September.

In 2002, the Accademia del Pizzocchero di Teglio was founded to promote traditional preparations of pizzocchero.

In 2016, the dish gained the European Union's recognition of protected geographical indication (PGI).

== Variations ==
Pizzoccheri della Valtellina – the original variation from Valtellina, is cooked along with greens (often Swiss chard, but also Savoy cabbage), and cubed potatoes. This mixture is layered with pieces of Valtellina Casera cheese and ground Grana Padano or Parmesan, and dressed with garlic lightly fried in butter.

Pizzoccheri bianchi della Valchiavenna – from the area around Chiavenna, is quite distinct, being a form of gnocchetti, often made from white wheat flour and dry bread.

== See also ==
Media related to Pizzoccheri at Wikimedia Commons

- List of pasta
