= Rosa Camuna =

Italian cheese

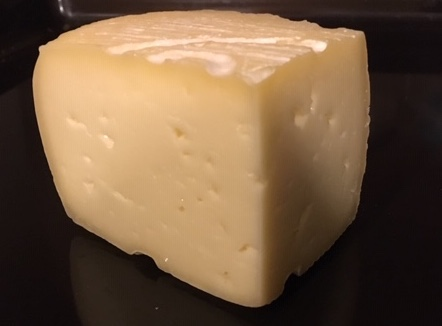
- Country of origin: Italy
- Region: Val Camonica (Lombardy)
- Source of milk: Cow
- Texture: semi-hard paste
- Weight: 1.3 to 2 kg
- Aging time: 30 to 45 days
- Certification: PAT

Rosa Camuna (Lombard: Roeusa Camuna) is an Italian mild semi-hard paste cheese made with partially skimmed cow's milk. Its shape and name come from the Camunian rose of Val Camonica where the cheese is produced. It has an ivory white color inside with uniformly spaced tiny eyes, and a soft bloomy rind. It has a mild taste and melts very well.
