= Pirlo (aperitivo) =

Alcoholic drink

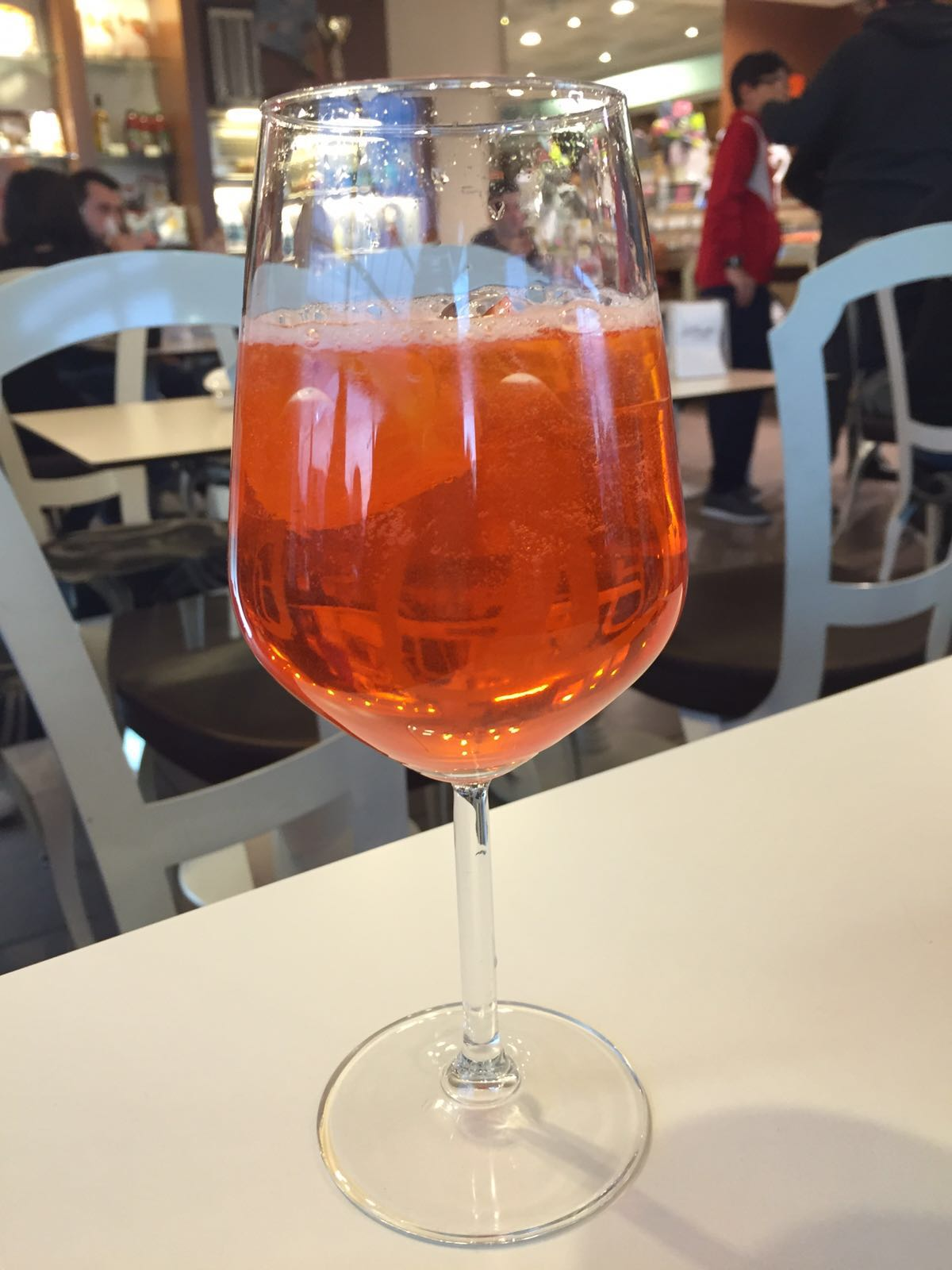
Pirlo in a glass

Pirlo is an alcoholic drink, usually served as an apéritif, historically originated in the province of Brescia, Lombardy. It is made with still white wine and Campari. Pirlo is served in a long stem glass with a typical balloon or tulip shape.
