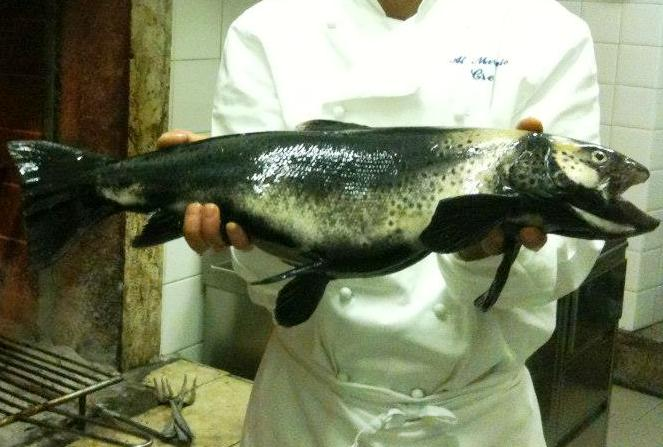

Conservation status
- Endangered (IUCN 3.1)

Scientific classification
- Kingdom: Animalia
- Phylum: Chordata
- Class: Actinopterygii
- Division: Teleostei
- Order: Salmoniformes
- Family: Salmonidae
- Genus: Salmo
- Species: S. carpio

Binomial name
- Salmo carpio Linnaeus, 1758

= Salmo carpio =

Species of fish

Salmo carpio, also known as the carpione (carpione del Garda or Lake Garda carpione), is a salmonid fish endemic to Lake Garda in Italy. It has been introduced to a number of other lakes in Italy and elsewhere but unsuccessfully in all cases. The population in Lake Garda has been strongly declining, and is considered endangered. The main threats are due to overfishing, pollution and possibly competition from introduced species such as Coregonus and other Salmonidae.

== Biology ==
Adult lake trout outside the mating season are silvery with very few black spots on the body and almost none on the head. During the mating season some males develop a dark mottled body coloration. Garda lake trout reach a length of up to 69 centimetres (27 in). They live primarily in depths of 100 to 200 m (328 to 656 ft). They feed on zooplankton and bottom-dwelling crustaceans in summer. Males and females reach sexual maturity at two or three years. The mating takes place every one to two years. The spawning takes place either winter or summer at a depth of 50 to 300 metres (160 to 980 ft) in the vicinity of underwater springs. The maximum age for this fish is five years.

== Status ==
The numbers of this fish in Lake Garda seem to be dwindling rapidly and had reduced by 80% in the ten years up to 2006. It is suspected that this may be because of pollution of the lake, over fishing and degradation of the lake habitat, and also the fish may face competition from introduced fish species such as Coregonus spp.. The IUCN has assessed this fish as being an "Endangered species". A captive breeding project has been inaugurated and initial results show good production of eggs, fry and juveniles and low mortality rates. It is hoped to retain broodstock and later reintroduce fish into the lake.

== Bibliography ==
- Stefano Porcellotti (2005). Pesci d'Italia, Ittiofauna delle acque dolci (PLAN 2005 ed.). pp. 16–17. ISBN 978-88-88719-14-6.
- Zerunian S. "Condannati all'estinzione Biodiversità, biologia, minacce e strategie di conservazione dei Pesci d'acqua dolce indigeni in Italia" [Doomed to Extinction Biodiversity, Biology, Threats and Conservation Strategies of Indigenous Freshwater Fish in Italy]. Edagricole. 2002: 61–62.
