= Emilian cuisine =

Culinary traditions of Emilia, Italy

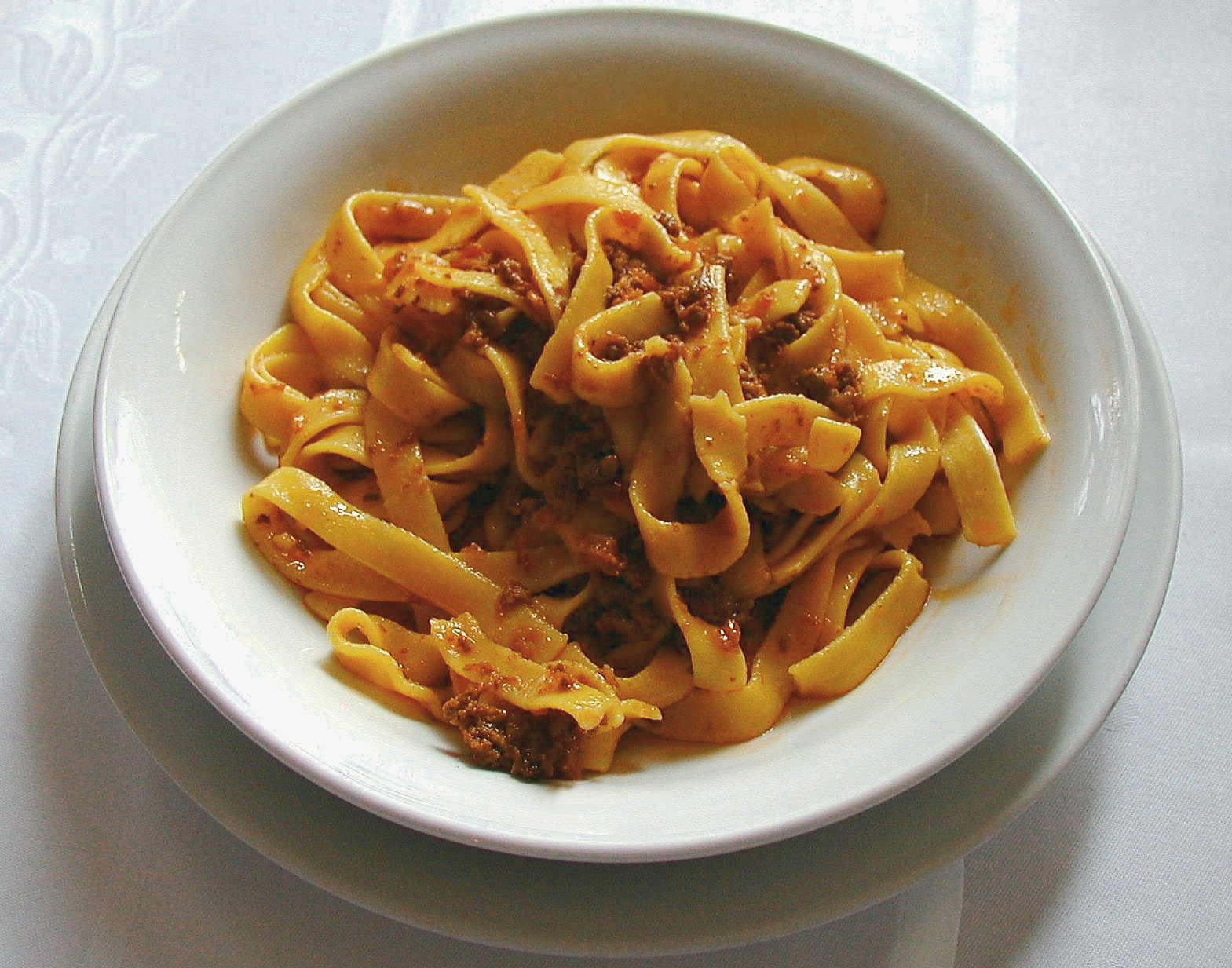
Tagliatelle with Bolognese sauce, a typical Emilian dish

Emilian cuisine consists of the cooking traditions and practices of the Italian region of Emilia. As in most regions of Italy, more than a cuisine, it is a constellation of cuisines that, in Emilia, represents the result of nearly eight centuries of autonomy of the Emilian cities, from the time of the municipalities to the unification of Italy.

== Overview ==
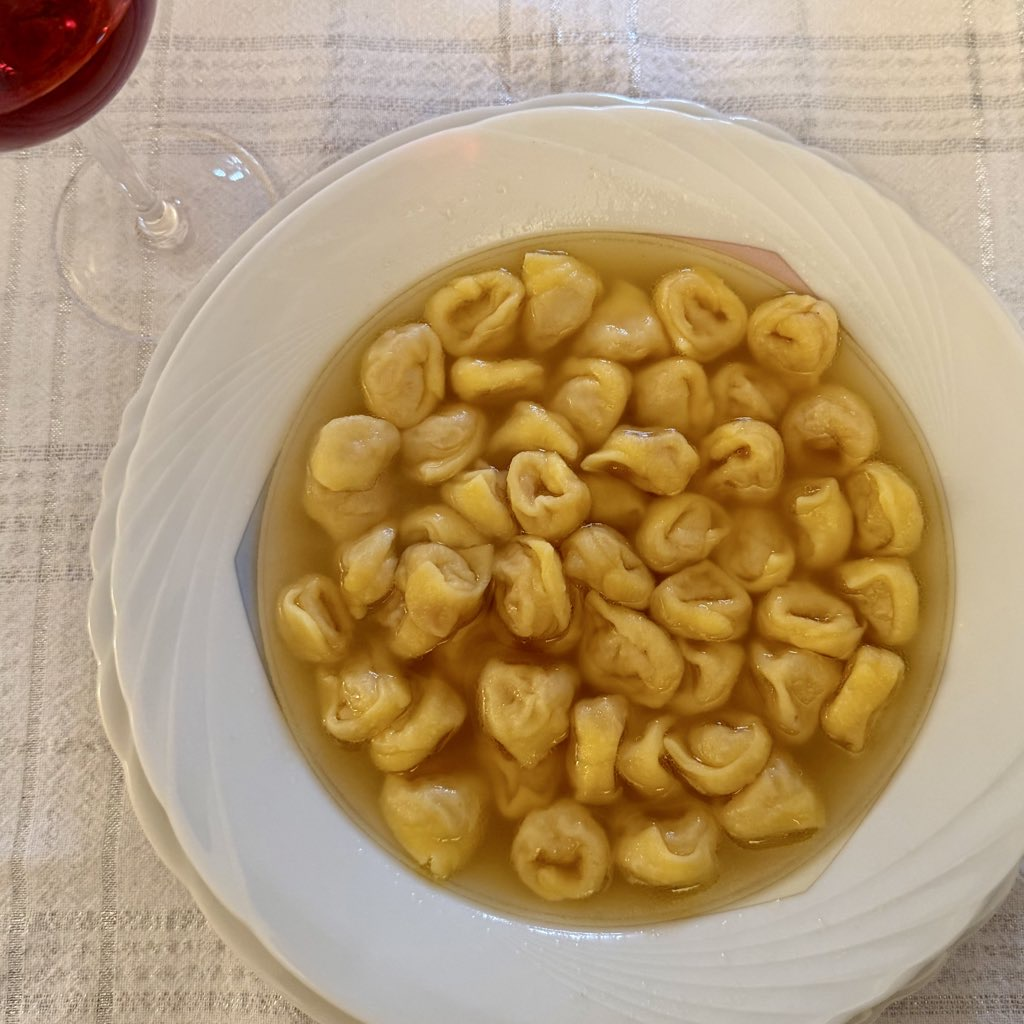
Tortellini in broth

Emilia is especially known for its egg and filled pasta made with soft wheat flour. Bologna and Modena are notable for pasta dishes such as tortellini, tortelloni, lasagna, gramigna, and tagliatelle, which are found also in many other parts of the region in different declinations, while Ferrara is known for cappellacci di zucca, pumpkin-filled dumplings, and Piacenza for pisarei e faśö, wheat gnocchi with beans and lard. The celebrated balsamic vinegar is made only in the Emilian cities of Modena and Reggio Emilia, following legally binding traditional procedures.

In the Emilia, except Piacenza which is heavily influenced by the cuisines of Lombardy, rice is eaten to a lesser extent than the rest of northern Italy. Polenta, a maize-based side dish, is common in both Emilia and Romagna. Parmesan (Italian: Parmigiano Reggiano) and Grana Padano cheeses are produced in Reggio Emilia and Piacenza respectively.

Although the Adriatic coast is a major fishing area (well known for its eels and clams harvested in the Valli di Comacchio), the region is more famous for its meat products, especially pork-based, that include cold cuts such as prosciutto di Parma, culatello, and salame Felino; Piacenza's pancetta, coppa, and salami; mortadella Bologna and salame rosa; zampone, cotechino, and cappello del prete; and Ferrara's salama da sugo. Piacenza is also known for some dishes prepared with horse and donkey meat. Regional desserts include zuppa inglese (custard-based dessert made with sponge cake and Alchermes liqueur), panpepato (Christmas cake made with pepper, chocolate, spices, and almonds), tenerina (butter and chocolate cake) and torta degli addobbi (rice and milk cake).

== History ==
The divergence of historical paths between the popes-dominated Emilia and the duchies' one had consequences that are also felt in the culinary and gastronomic fields. While contrasts prevail over similarities between Romagna's cuisine, incorporated for nearly four hundred years into the Papal States, and that of Emilia, the cuisines of the different Emilian cities form a picture that, although highly varied, nonetheless presents significant common traits. The cuisine of Piacenza is somewhat of an exception, characterized by influences from Lombard cuisine as well as from Ligurian cuisine, and that of Ferrara, due to its eccentric position, has developed and preserved distinctly unique features.

Precisely because it was governed by powerful noble families, at whose courts the most celebrated chefs worked, Emilia has great gastronomic traditions. Throughout the Renaissance and Baroque periods, two culinary "schools" dominated the country: the Roman one at the papal court and, indeed, the Emilian one. In Ferrara, Giovan Battista Rossetti and Cristoforo di Messisbugo were active; in Parma, it seems, Vincenzo Cervio served; in Bologna, Giulio Cesare Tirelli and Bartolomeo Stefani were at work. It is likely that the Emilian cuisine inherited from the 15th and 16th-century traditions the characteristics of opulence and extravagance for which Bologna is still called la Grassa ('the Fat').

== Dishes ==
=== Primi piatti ===
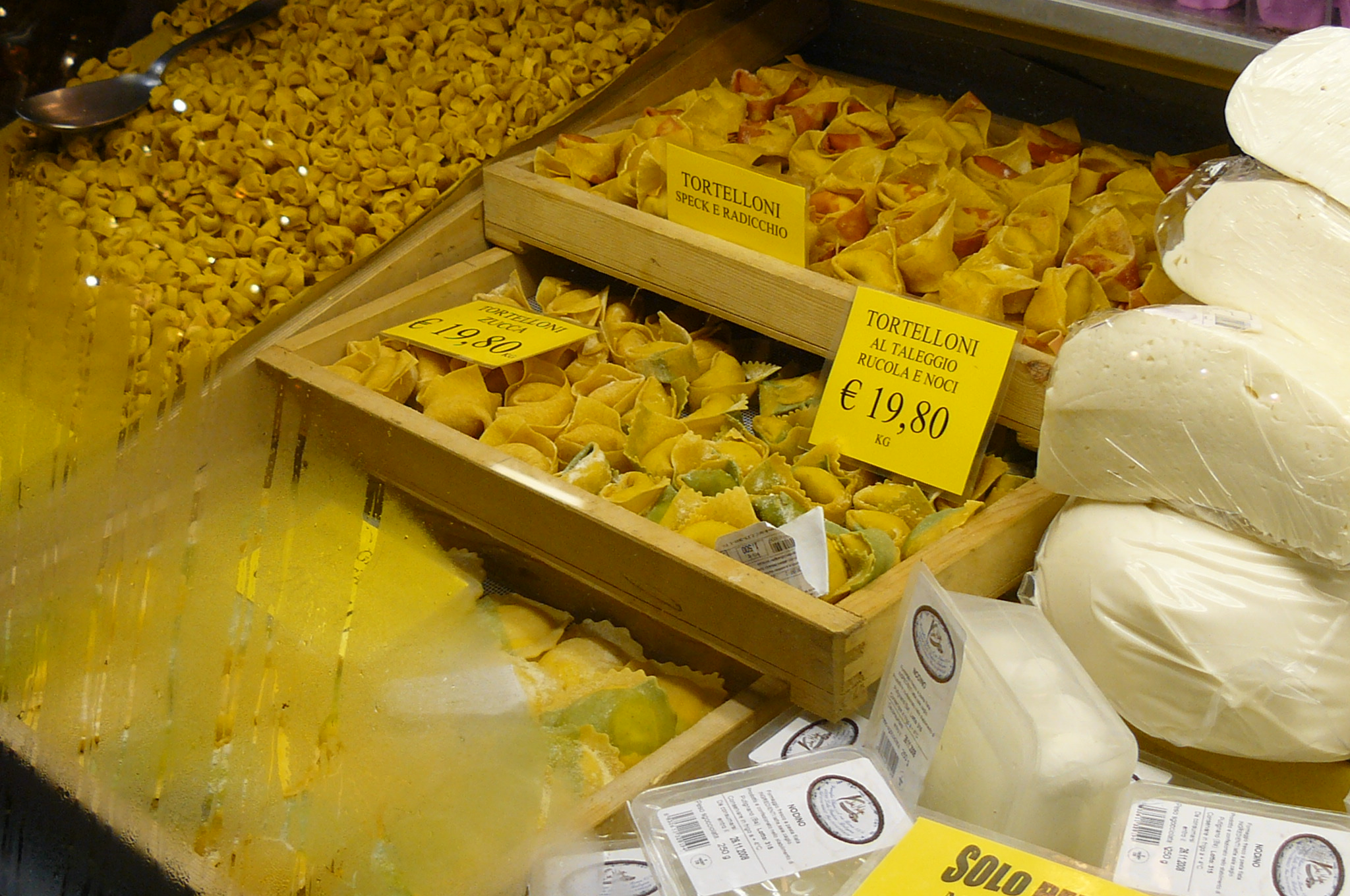
Different shapes of pasta in Bologna

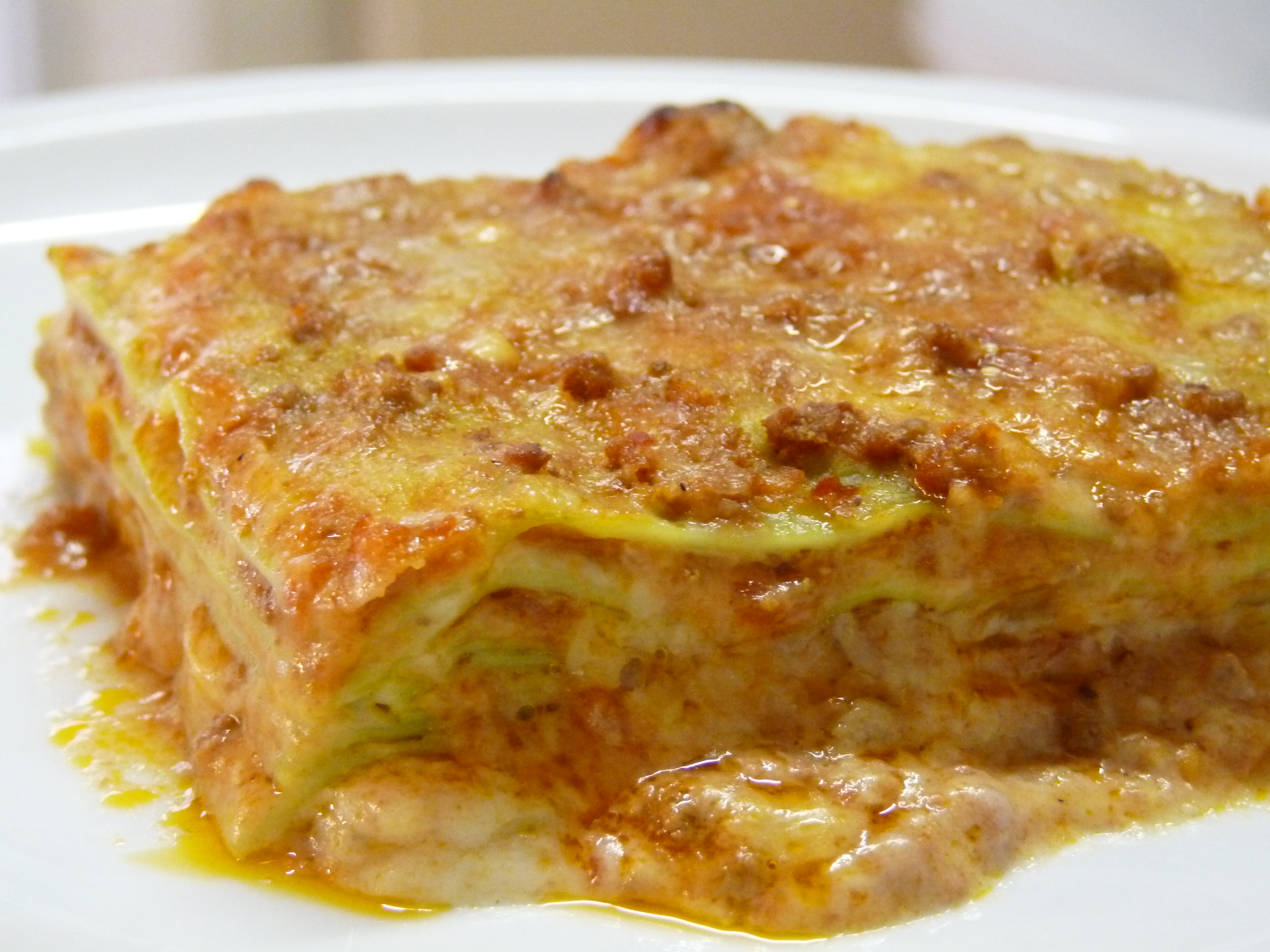
Baked lasagna with ragù

The cornerstone of Emilian cuisine is its pasta dishes, characterized by a dough made from soft wheat flour and eggs (without water). First and foremost are the tagliatelle, often served with Bolognese sauce (ragù) or diced ham sautéed in butter. A variation is the green tagliatelle, in which the dough includes chard, spinach, or even nettles. With this green dough, also lasagna is prepared, a rich dish with alternating layers of ragù, béchamel sauce, and Parmesan cheese. Parma is the Emilian city with the oldest and most precise codification of pasta usage: Salimbene di Adam mentions both filled and dry fresh pasta made with soft wheat flour and eggs. The fresh pasta dough (known as fojäda) is central to Parma's gastronomic identity, most notably seen in filled pastas, whether served in broth or dry, especially in anolini (which, in Reggio Emilia, are also called cappelletti) and tortelli.

Tortellini, a symbol of Bolognese and Modenese cuisine, belong to the large family of filled pastas made with varying ingredients, a tradition dating back to medieval cookbooks and widespread throughout central and northern Italy. Traditionally served in meat broth, they are also enjoyed dry with various sauces. Among other filled pastas, one should mention tortelloni of ricotta and herbs, which are distinguished by their larger size compared to tortellini and by the inclusion of ricotta, Parmesan cheese, and parsley in the filling. In Piacenza, anolini are found, while pumpkin tortelli, similar to those from Mantua, are common in Piacenza and Reggio Emilia; in Ferrara, these are called cappellacci di zucca. In Ferrara, cappelletti are also found, which, unlike the Romagna version, contain a meat-based filling (batù). Also notable is the erbazzone from Reggio Emilia, a type of savory pie made with spinach and other vegetables, seasoned with Parmesan cheese, and baked in the oven.

=== Secondi piatti, salumi and cheeses ===
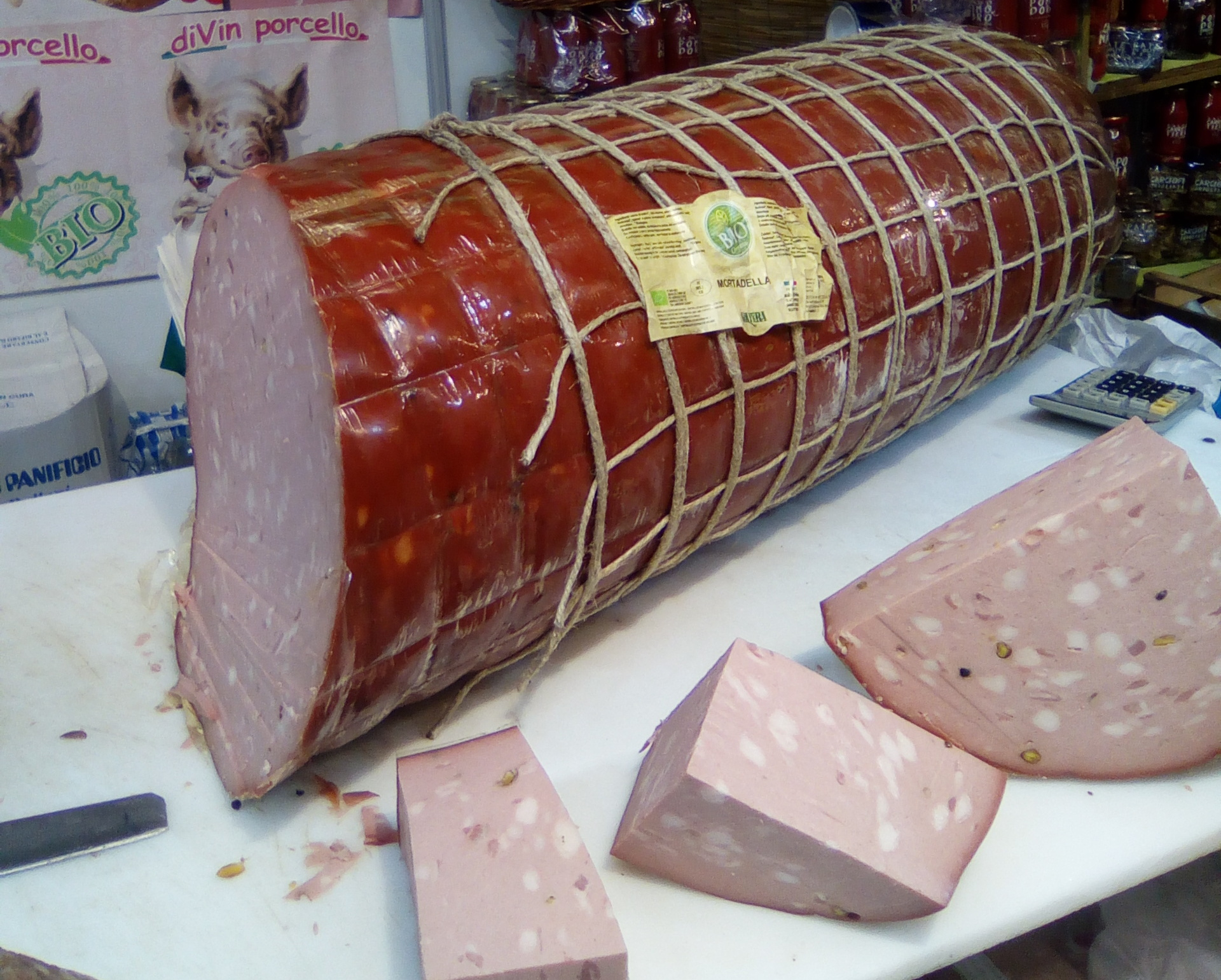
Mortadella

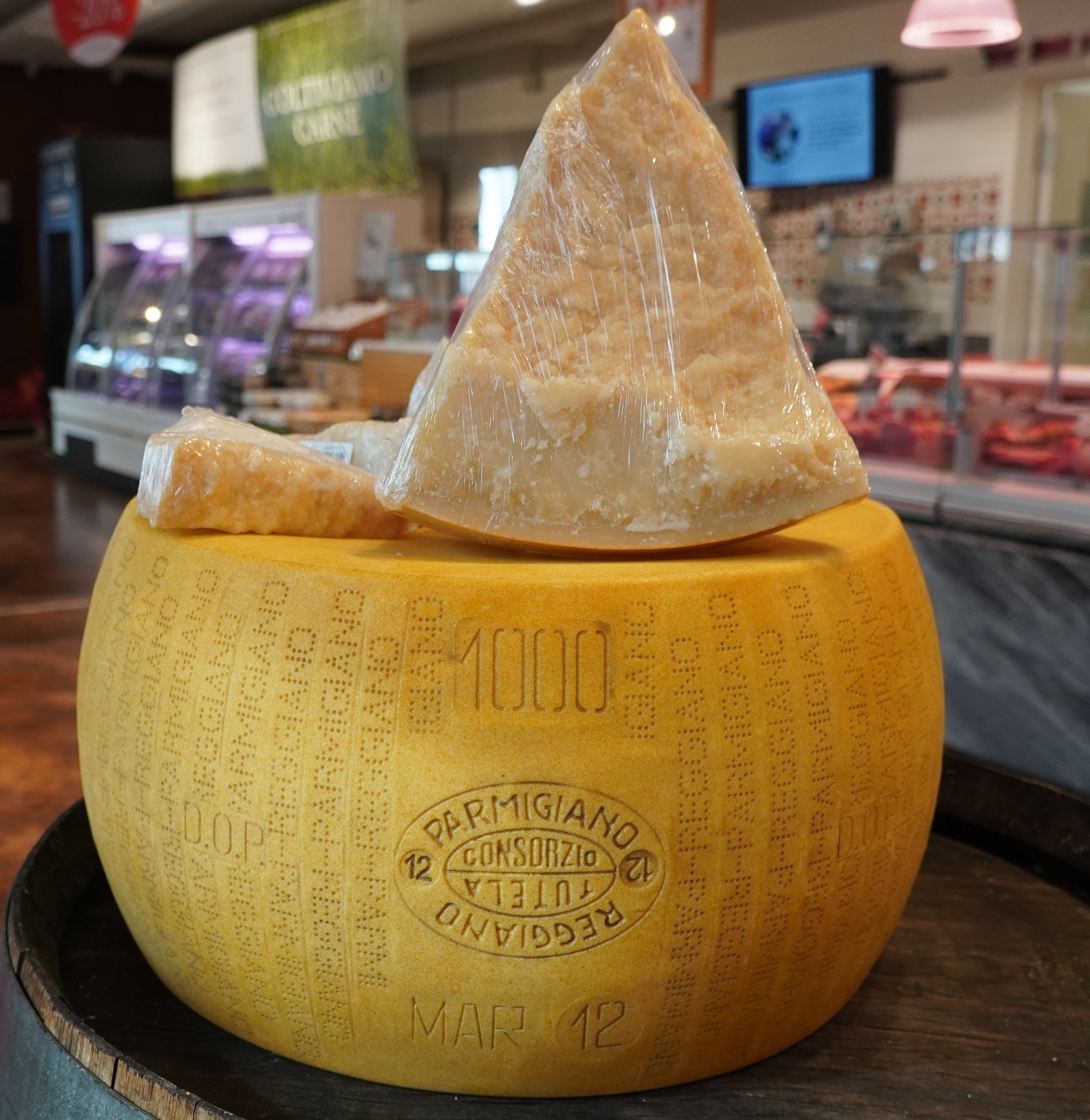
Parmigiano Reggiano

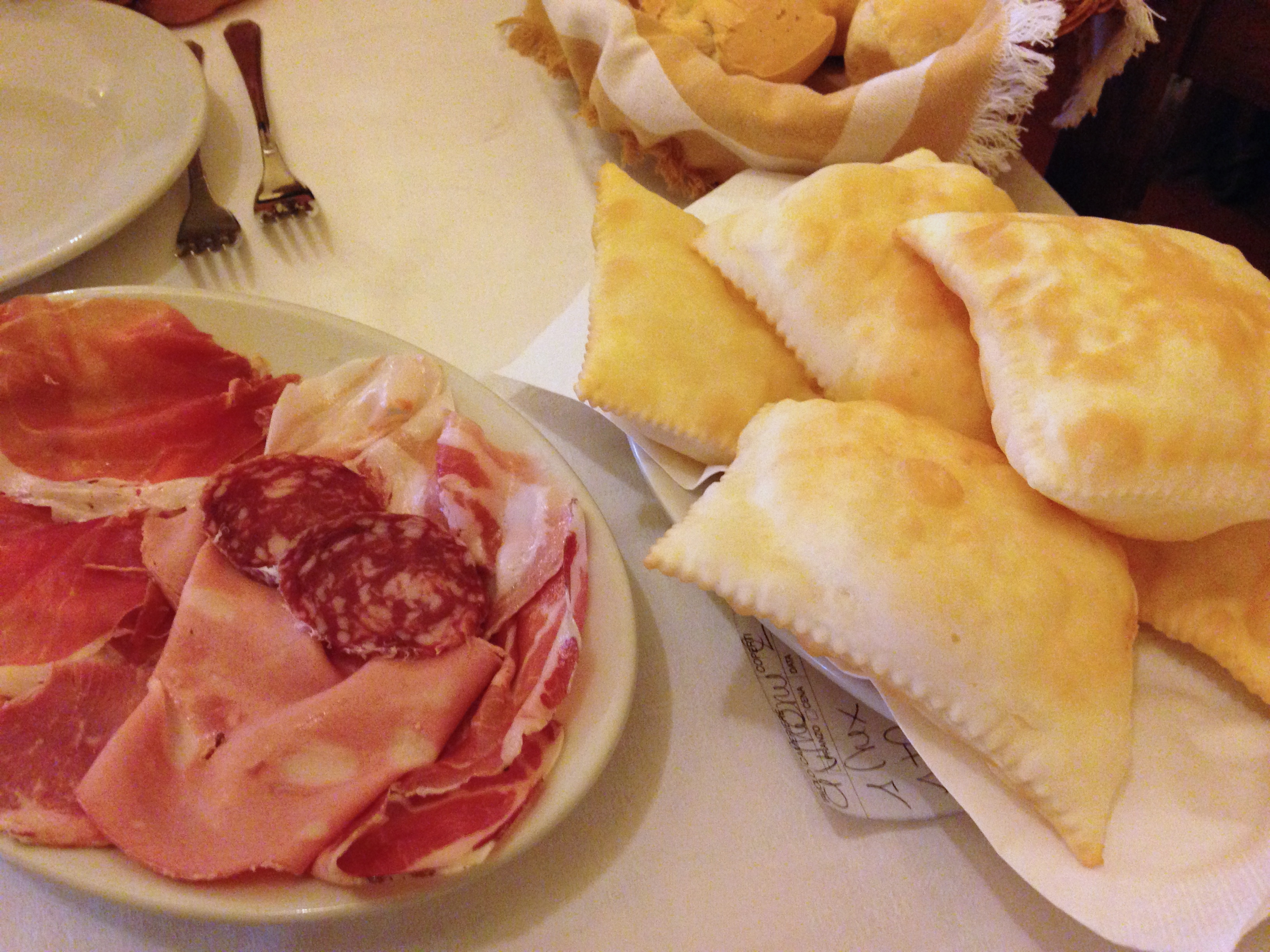
Gnocco fritto with salumi

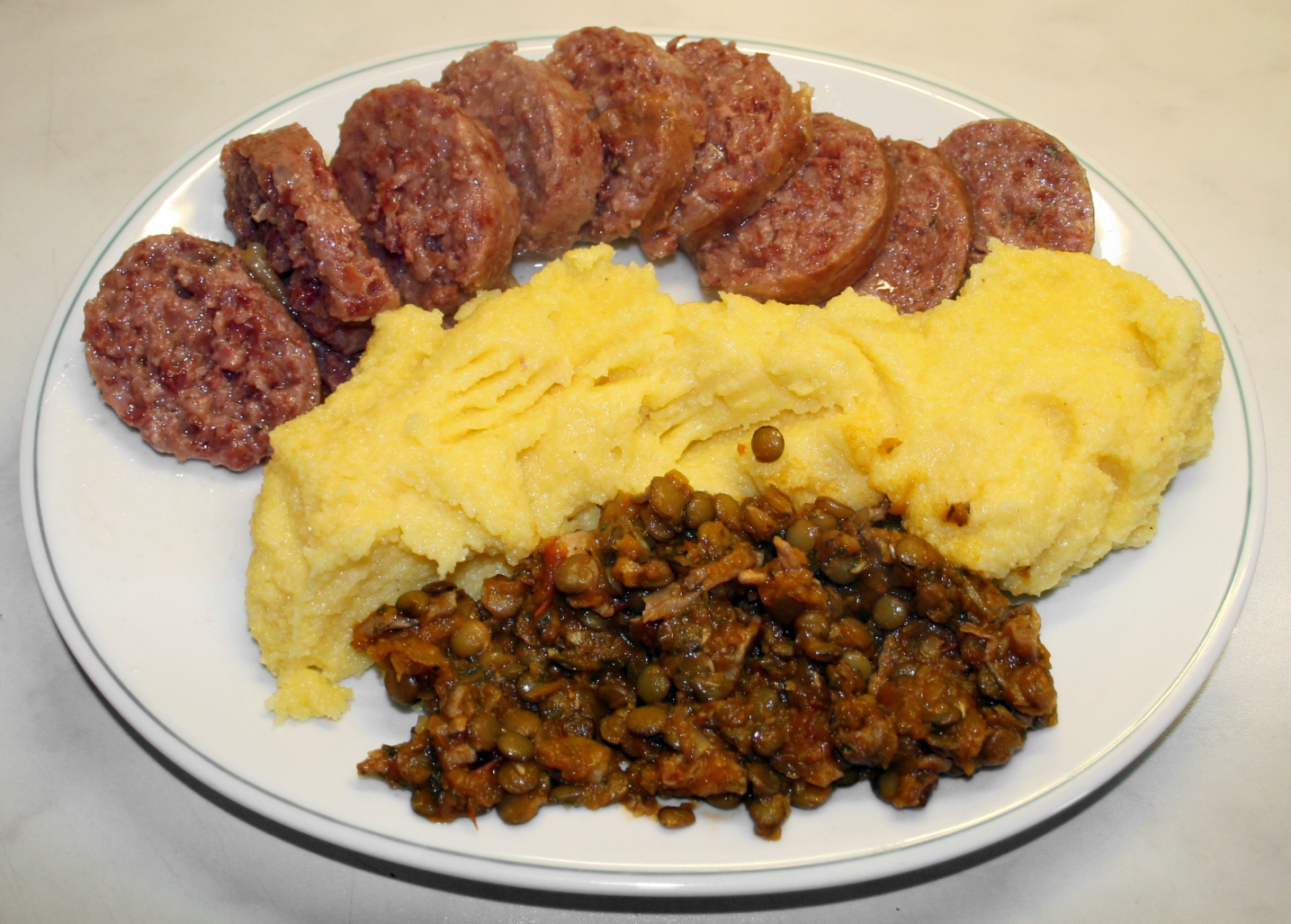
Cotechino with polenta and lentils

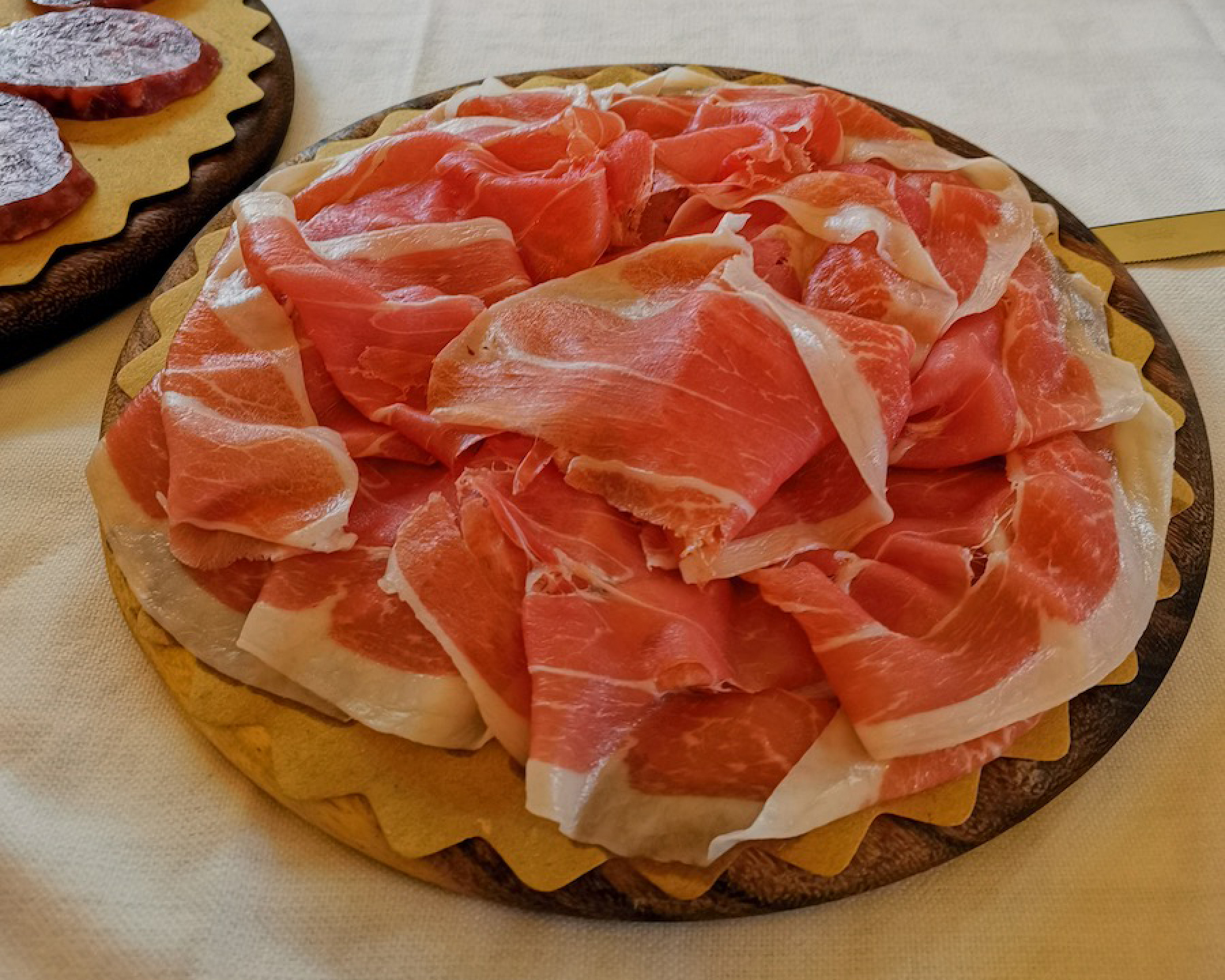
Prosciutto di Parma

As for main dishes, the primary ingredients are meat and dairy products. The cotoletta alla bolognese is a rich variation of the veal Milanese, while another variation made with horse meat is the Piacenza's faldìa. The veal fillet (cooked in butter with ham, grated cheese, and truffle) is an example of Grande Cuisine interpreted in the Bolognese style. The Piacenza-style braised beef (stracotto), hearty and fragrant with spices, has ancestors and relatives scattered across the peninsula: more characteristic versions include those made with horse or donkey meat. Notable dishes include pìcula 'd cavall (a dish made with minced horse meat) and Piacenza's stracotto d'asinina, a dish from a military city where horse meat was easily available, as well as the stuffed vegetables from the Piacenza Apennines or the stuffed veal shoulder, which reveals a Ligurian influence. Along the River Po, eel is commonly consumed. The second most typical dish for festive occasions is the boiled meat cart, which includes various cuts of boiled beef and some pork sausages.

Emilia produces a large variety of cured meats (salumi). Mortadella Bologna, made from pork and beef, is a flavorful, inexpensive sausage. Modena mortadella is made from pure pork. The hams from the Parma area produced hams. Culatello, produced in the lower Parma region and made from the "heart" of the ham, is a kind of salume. Felino, in the Parma area, produces an aged, intensely flavored salami. Another salume from the area is the shoulder of San Secondo, available both in the more famous cooked version and the rarer raw version. The zampone and cotechino sausages from Modena and Bologna are very well known: both are served, steaming, in mixed boiled dishes from Bologna, Modena, and Reggio Emilia. The Ferrara salama da sugo, very flavorful and highly spiced, is a dish that dates to the Renaissance. The coppa piacentina is also very famous, as are the Piacenza's pancetta and salami. Also worth mentioning are the fresh and dry ciccioli (from Zocca), cicciolata, coppa di testa, rolled pancetta and the Ferrarese salami with garlic.

Parmigiano Reggiano is an essential ingredient in numerous traditional and modern dishes from Emilia and other regions, and is also consumed on its own, in small shavings. In the province of Piacenza, Grana Padano and Provolone Val Padana are produced. Other notable cheeses are stracchino, casatella, caciotta from Castel San Pietro Terme and the sweet pecorino from Bologna's hills.

=== Desserts ===
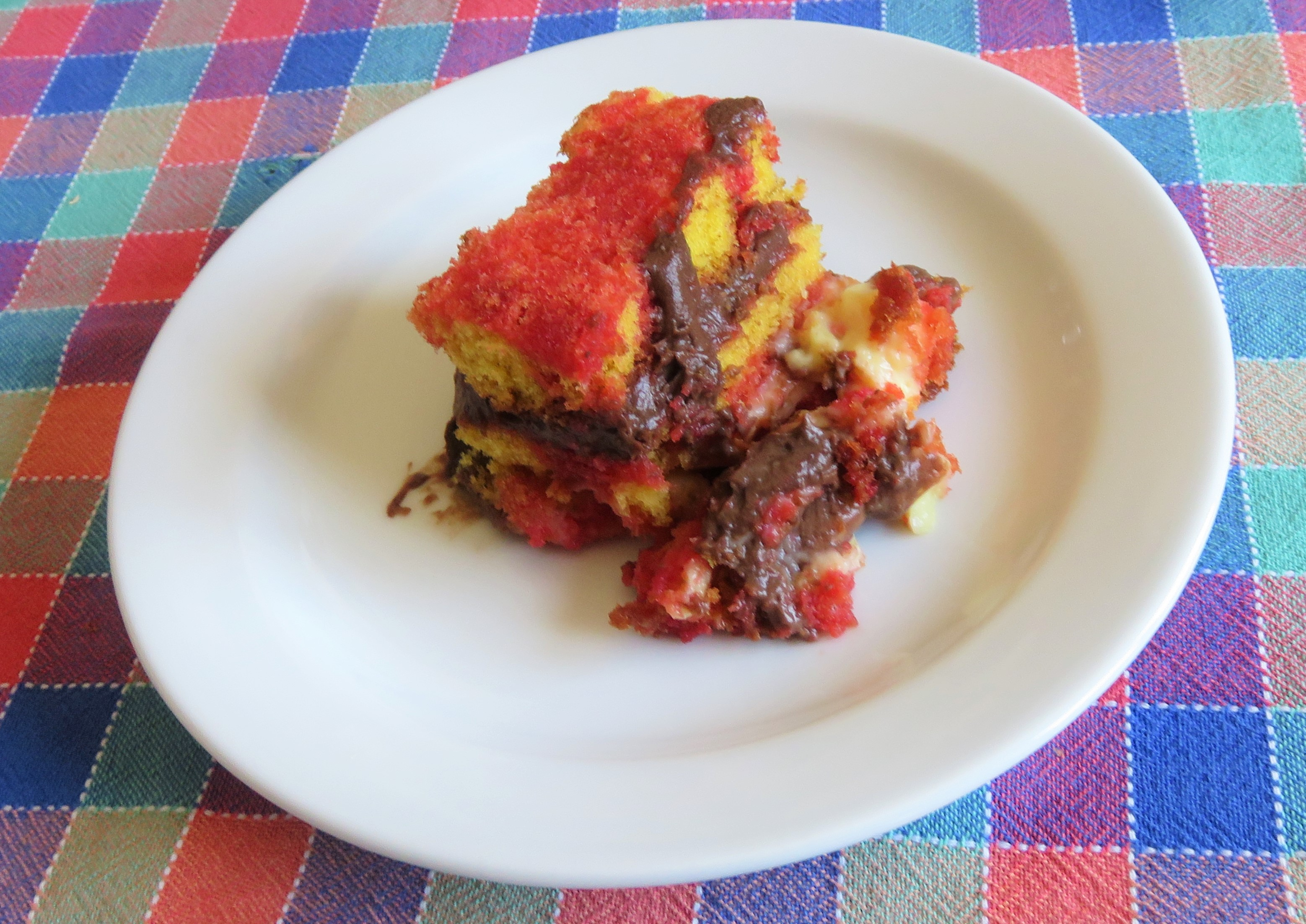
Zuppa inglese

Among the desserts, those with Renaissance origins stand out, rich in almonds, honey, and spices: the certosino (or panspeziale), the panone and Bologna's rice cake, the torta Barozzi from Vignola, the spongata from Brescello, Busseto, Corniglio, Modena, Piacenza, and other areas, and the panpepato from Ferrara. Alongside these, we must not forget some modest yet widespread popular sweets such as frappe (or sfrappole), castagnole, ciambella (also known by various dialectal names such as buslàn, bensone, belsone or brazadèla), and the biscione reggiano from Reggio Emilia.

=== Wines and liquors ===
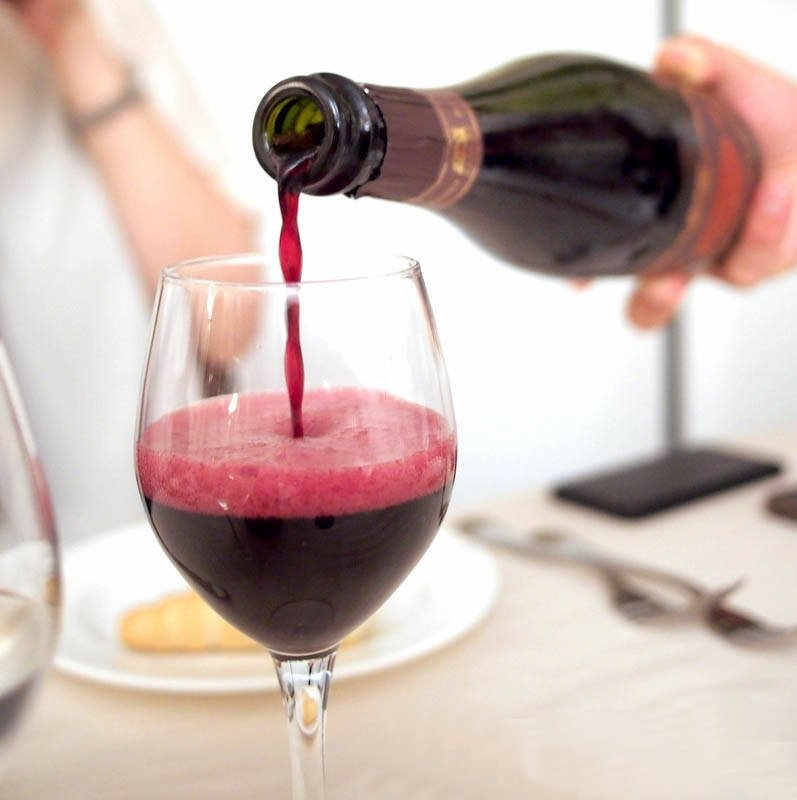
Lambrusco wine

In Emilia, the flatland areas do not offer a great variety of wines. Lambrusco, in its dry, light, and sparkling version, pairs well with the rich and flavorful dishes typical of Emilian cuisine, providing the perfect contrast; in its sweet version, it is a dessert wine or a wine for conversation. The Lambrusco wines produced in the province of Modena include Lambrusco di Sorbara rosso, Salamino di Santa Croce, and Grasparossa di Castelvetro. In the province of Reggio Emilia, Lambrusco Reggiano is produced. In the hilly areas, notable wines are produced, such as Pignoletto from the Bolognesese hills, as well as Malvasia, Gutturnio, Ortrugo, and Bonarda from the Piacenza area. In the Scandiano area, Bianco di Scandiano is also produced, available in both dry and sweet versions.

The most prominent wines and liquors produced in Emilia region are:

- Bianco di Scandiano
- Bonarda
- Gutturnio
- Lambrusco
- Malvasia
- Nocello
- Nocino
- Ortrugo
- Pignoletto
- Rosso Antico

== See also ==
- Italian cuisine

== Bibliography ==
- Piras, Claudia; Medagliani, Eugenio (2000). Culinaria Italy. Könemann Verlagsgesellschaft mbh. ISBN 3-8290-2901-2.
