= Cuisine of Mantua =

Culinary traditions of Mantua

Mantuan cuisine is the set of traditional dishes of the Italian province of Mantua, some of which date back to the time of the Gonzaga.

It is a cuisine bound to the land by peasant traditions; however, it is very rich and varied. Differences can be found between local variants of the same dish.

Given the geographical position occupied by the province of Mantua, the Mantuan culinary tradition is similar to Emilian cuisine, where salami and pasta are more prevalent and to Lombard cuisine, which makes more use of rice.

== Antipasti ==
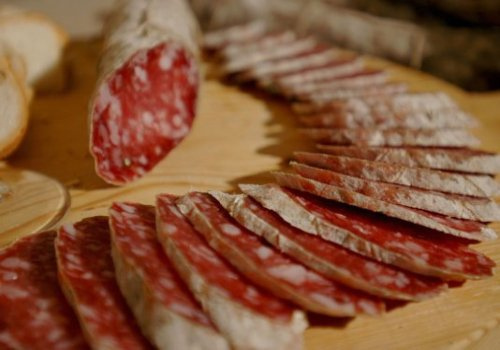
Salame mantovano

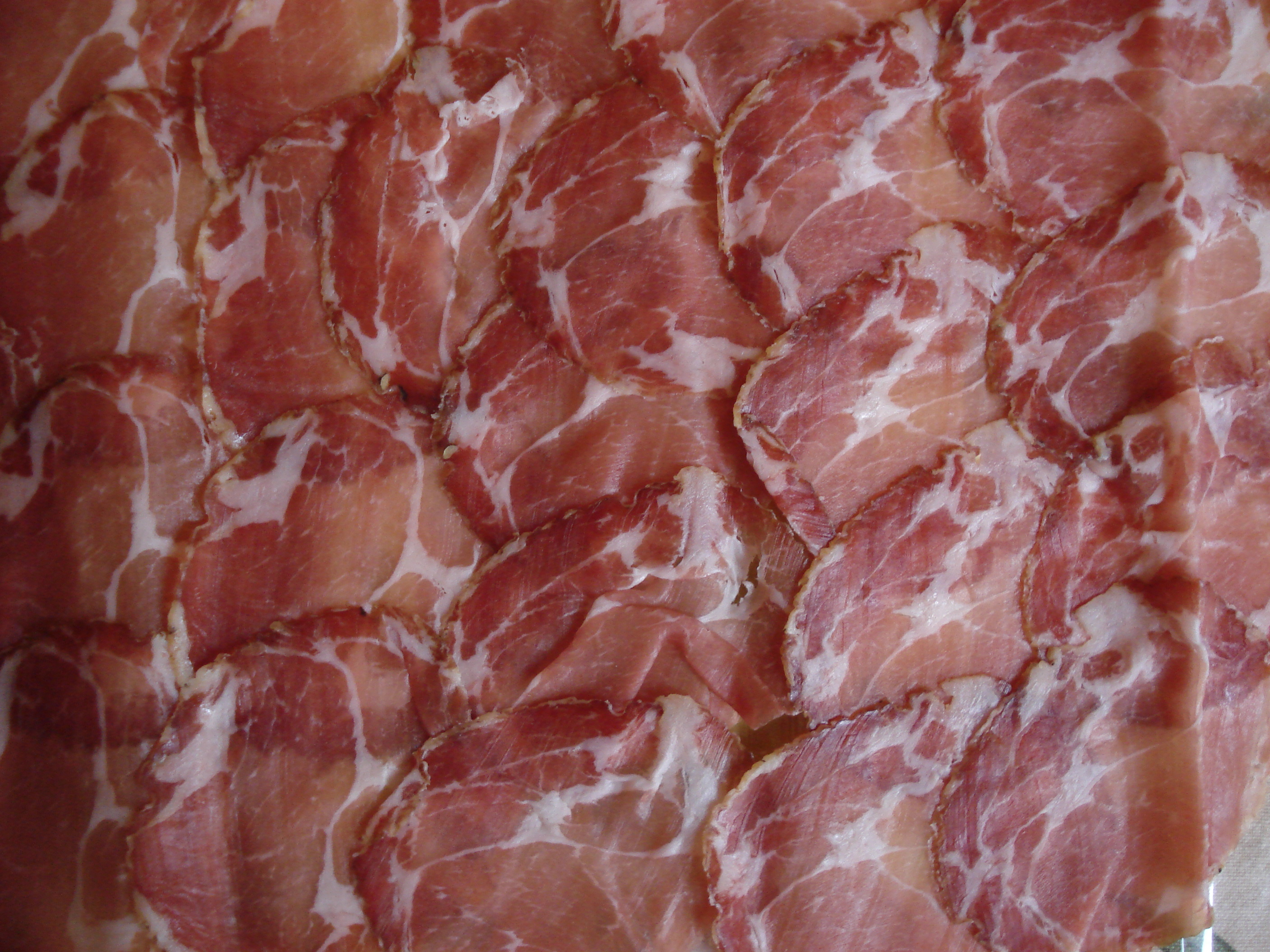
Coppa

The traditional Mantuan antipasto consists of cold cuts.

Name	Image	Description
Salame mantovano		Salami with or without added fresh garlic
Coppa		pork cold cut made from the dry-cured muscle
Pancetta		

Other popular cold cuts are:

Name	Image	Description
Gras pìstà		pork lardo minced with a knife and garlic
Ciccioli or gréppole		pieces of cooked and dried pork and fat
Culatello		from Parma (it is, however, also produced in some municipalities of Mantua)

Cold cuts are often accompanied by:

- Gnocco fritto, squares or rhombuses of bread dough fried in hot lard. It originates from the provinces of Modena and Reggio Emilia, only in recent times it has spread to the Mantova area, and it is better known with the name of "torta fritta" (fried cake) with which it is called in other areas of Emilia.
- Chisœla, typical savory focaccia
- Tirot, focaccia with onions originally from Felonica, typical of the Bassa
- Chisœlina, crispy and salty scone
- Luccio in salsa

== First courses ==
Soups with broth:

Name	Image	Description
Agnolini		egg pasta stuffed with beef, salami, chicken, breadcrumbs, Grana Padano cheese, nutmeg. There is also a variant stuffed with stewed beef.
Tagliatelline		quadretti and maltagliati, egg pasta cut into thin strips
Pasta trita		egg pasta dried and grated into very small pieces
Panàda		made of stale bread, oil and Parmesan cheese
Bevr'in vin		
Passatelli		
Mericonda		

Dry first courses:

Name	Image	Description
Tortelli di zucca		
Tortelli amari		typically from Castel Goffredo
Tagliatelle		
Gnocchi di zucca		
Capunsei		typically from Alto mantovano
Risotto alla pilota		seasoned with salamella
Risotto col puntèl		seasoned with salamella, ribs or pork chop
Risotto with frogs		seasoned with cleaned frogs, oil and onion
Risotto con i saltaréi		topped with fried crayfish

== Second courses ==
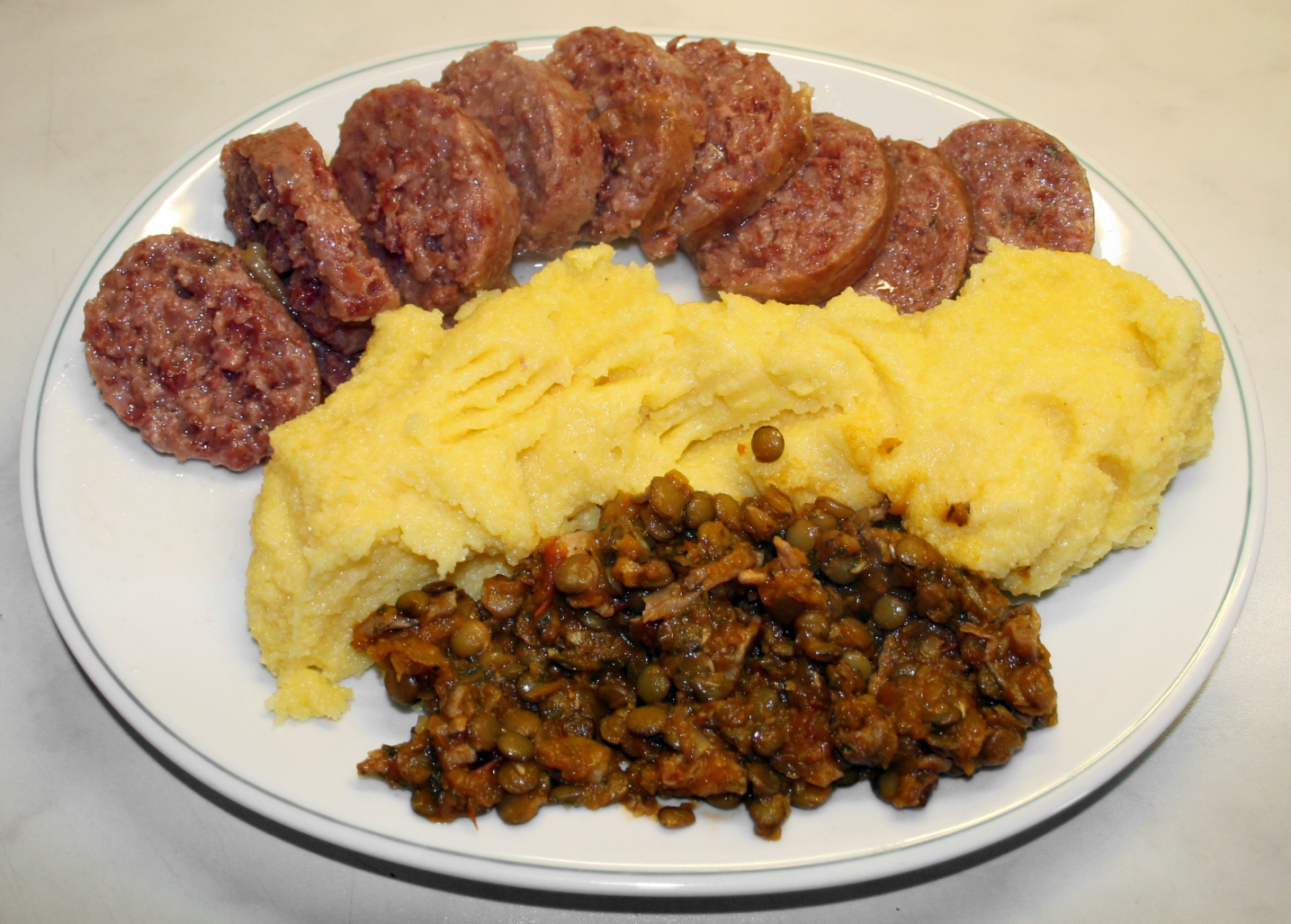
Cotechino with polenta

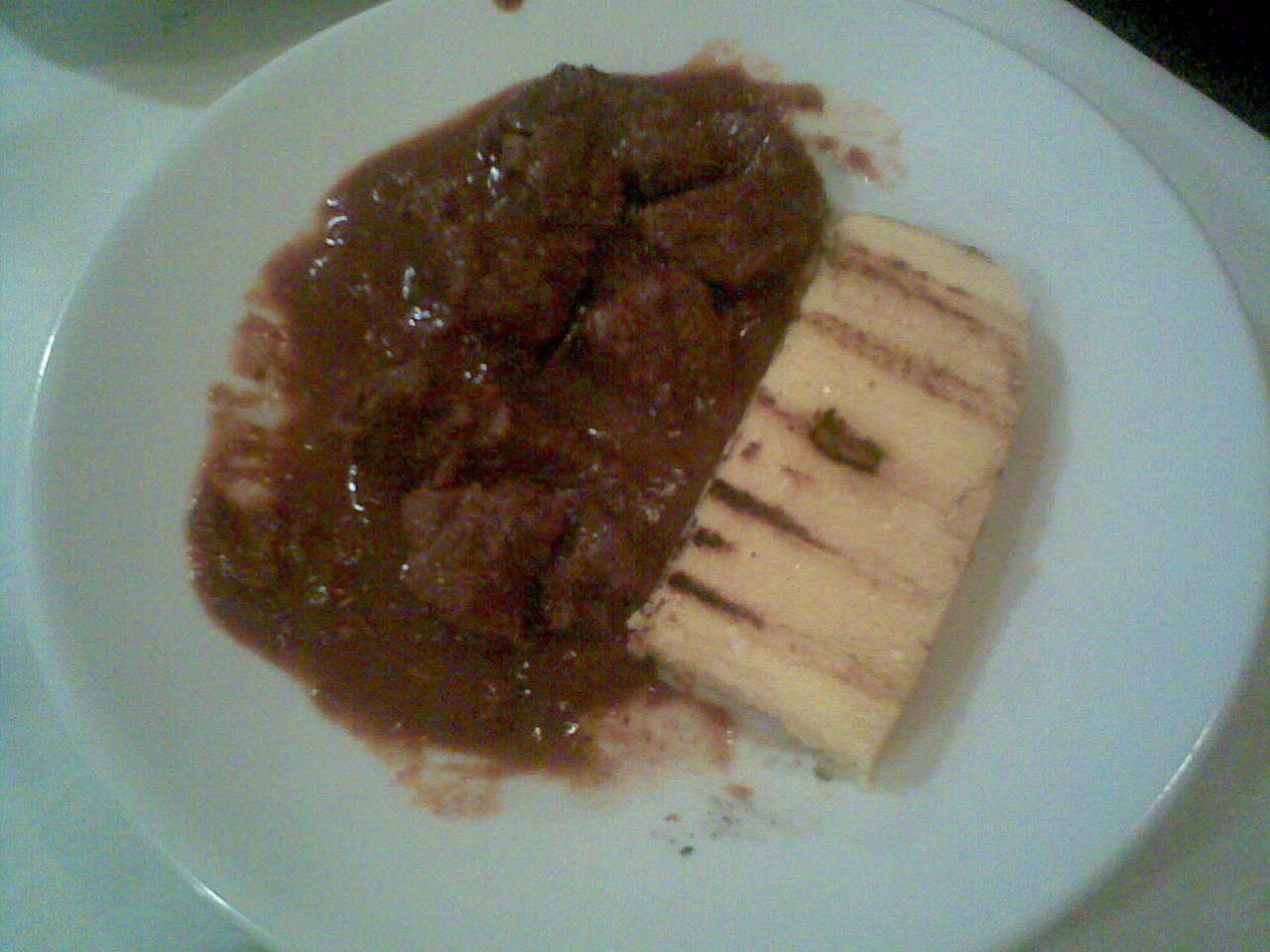
Stracotto

- Stracotto or brasato, made out of beef. It can be accompanied by polenta
- Stracotto d'asino, accompanied by polenta
- Bollito misto based on beef, chicken, and pork boiled in boiling water accompanied by mostarda
- Frittata con le rane
- Cotechino and pisto, accompanied by polenta and lentils
- Luccio in salsa, boiled freshwater fish accompanied by a sauce made of capers, parsley, salted anchovies, garlic and onion
- Black bullhead, typical of the areas near the Po river; it can be prepared fried or stewed.
- Roasted helmeted guineafowl

Side dishes:

- Peperonata
- Polenta
- Pollo alla Stefani

== Desserts ==
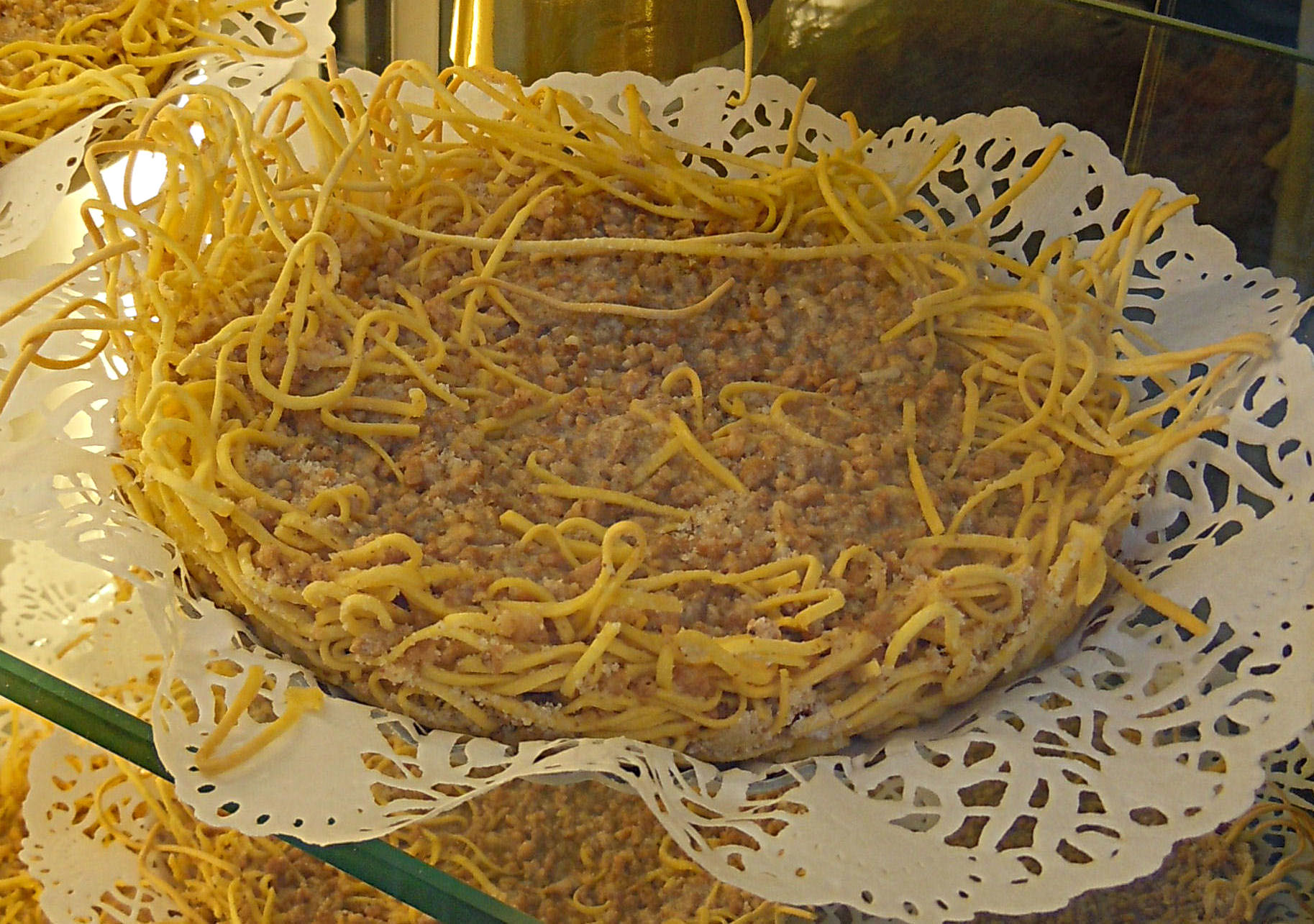
Torta di tagliatelle

- Torta sbrisolona, crumbly almond cake
- Torta Elvezia
- Torta di tagliatelle
- Torta mantovana
- Torta margherita
- Torta delle rose
- Anello di Monaco
- Bussolano or bussolà
- Chisöl, sweet focaccia
- Turtei sguasarot
- Zabaione
- Sugolo
- Fiapòn
- Torta greca
- Papasìn
- Caldi dolci
- Bignolata
- Torta sabbiosa or Torta del 3

== Wines ==
- Colli Morenici Mantovani del Garda bianco
- Garda Colli Mantovani Cabernet
- Garda Colli Mantovani Merlot
- Garda Colli Mantovani Pinot Grigio
- Garda Colli Mantovani Tocai Italico
- Garda Colli Mantovani bianco
- Lambrusco Mantovano

== Liquors ==
- Nocino, liqueur common in Emilia and made with green walnuts. It must rest for some years before being consumed.

== See also ==
- Italian cuisine
- Cuisine of Abruzzo
- Apulian cuisine
- Arbëreshë cuisine
- Emilian cuisine
- Cuisine of Liguria
- Lombard cuisine
- Cuisine of Basilicata
- Neapolitan cuisine
- Piedmontese cuisine
- Roman cuisine
- Cuisine of Sardinia
- Sicilian cuisine
- Tuscan cuisine
- Venetian cuisine

== Bibliography ==
- Brunetti, Gino, ed. (1981). Cucina mantovana di principi e di popolo. Testi antichi e ricette tradizionali. Mantova. [ISBN unspecified].
- Colucci, Claudia; Wainer Mazza (2007). Il quaderno delle ricette della grande provincia mantovana. San Giovanni Lupatoto.
- Polettini, Paolo; Luciana Corresini (2004). Il gioco dell'erba amara (2 ed.). Viadana. ISBN 978-88-87942-95-8.
- Luca Pollini (2008). Tutto Vino: guida completa ai vini d'Italia. Firenze. ISBN 9788844038632.
- Giancarlo Malagutti (a cura di), Mantova a tavola ogni giorno dell'anno. Raccontando la cucina attraverso il volgere delle stagioni. Mantova, 1991. ISBN non esistente.

== Related articles ==
- Cuisine of Alto Mantovano
- Cuisine of Castel Goffredo
- Cuisine of the Gonzaga family

== Other projects ==
- Media related to Cuisine of Mantua at Wikimedia Commons
- Cuisine of Mantua travel guide from Wikivoyage
