= Tortello amaro di Castel Goffredo =

Type of pasta

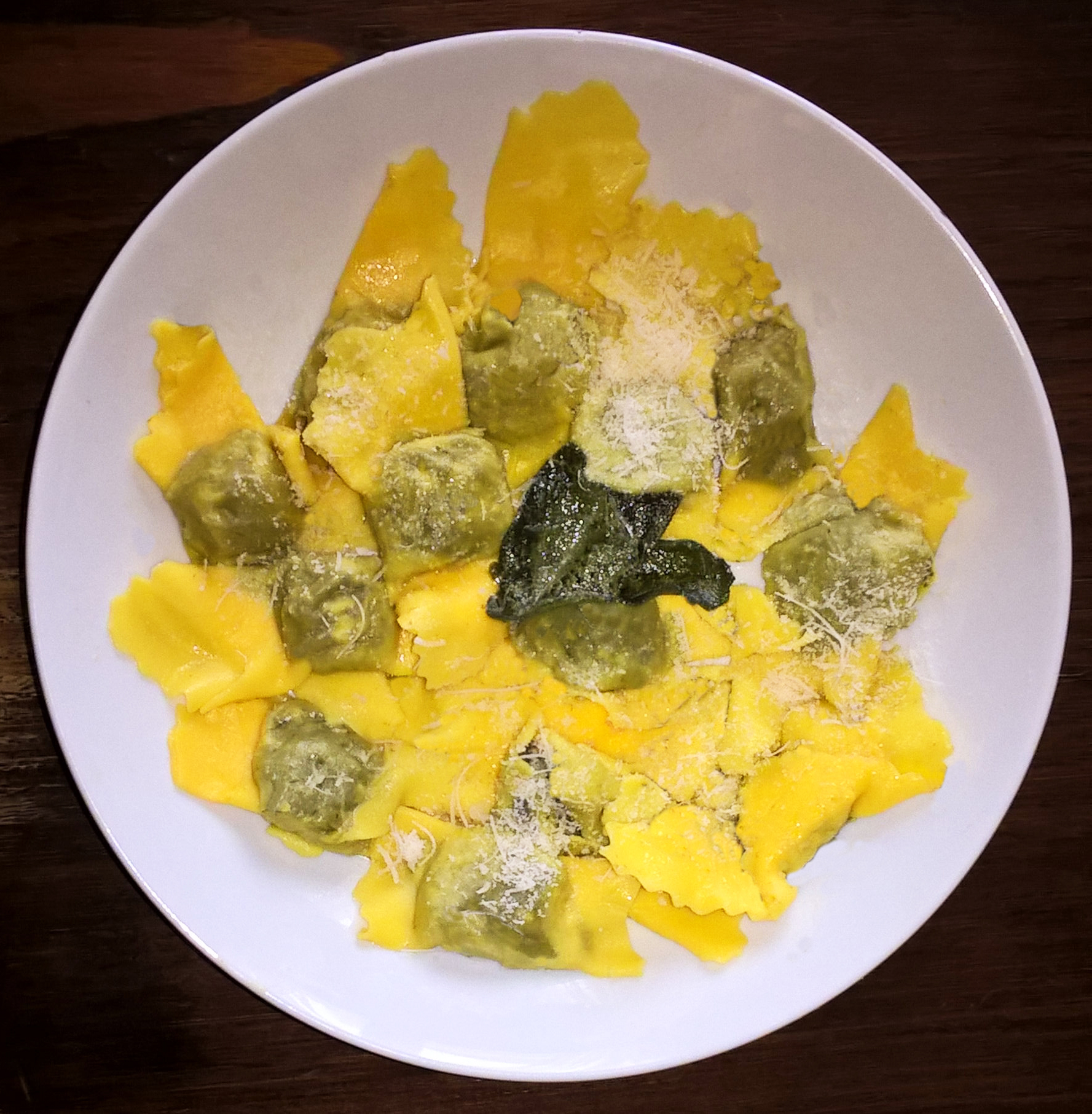
- Type: Pasta
- Place of origin: Italy
- Region or state: Lombardy
- Variations: Tortellini

The Tortello amaro di Castel Goffredo ("Castel Goffredo's bitter tortello") is a type of stuffed pasta similar to ravioli and recognized traditional food product of the Lombardy region, typical of the Castel Goffredo in the province of Mantua.

It is named for the presence of balsamita filling, an aromatic herb called locally 'bitter herb'. The other filling ingredients are herbs, parmesan cheese, bread crumbs, eggs, nutmeg, sage, onion, garlic and salt. Preparing fresh pasta is still a traditional recipe with 10 eggs per kg of flour. About the film obtained is the filling, folding and closing hand, to get well for tortello characteristically flattened triangular.

Once cooked in salt water, the tortelli served with sprinkled with parmesan cheese and a tablespoon of melted butter flavored with sage.

Annually, in the third week of June, in Castel Goffredo, there is the traditional "Feast of the Tortello amaro of Castel Goffredo".

== Bibliography ==
=== In italian ===
- Polettini, Paolo (2004). Il gioco dell'erba amara (in Italian). Viadana. ISBN 978-88-87942-95-8.
