= Salama da sugo =

Salami made of pork

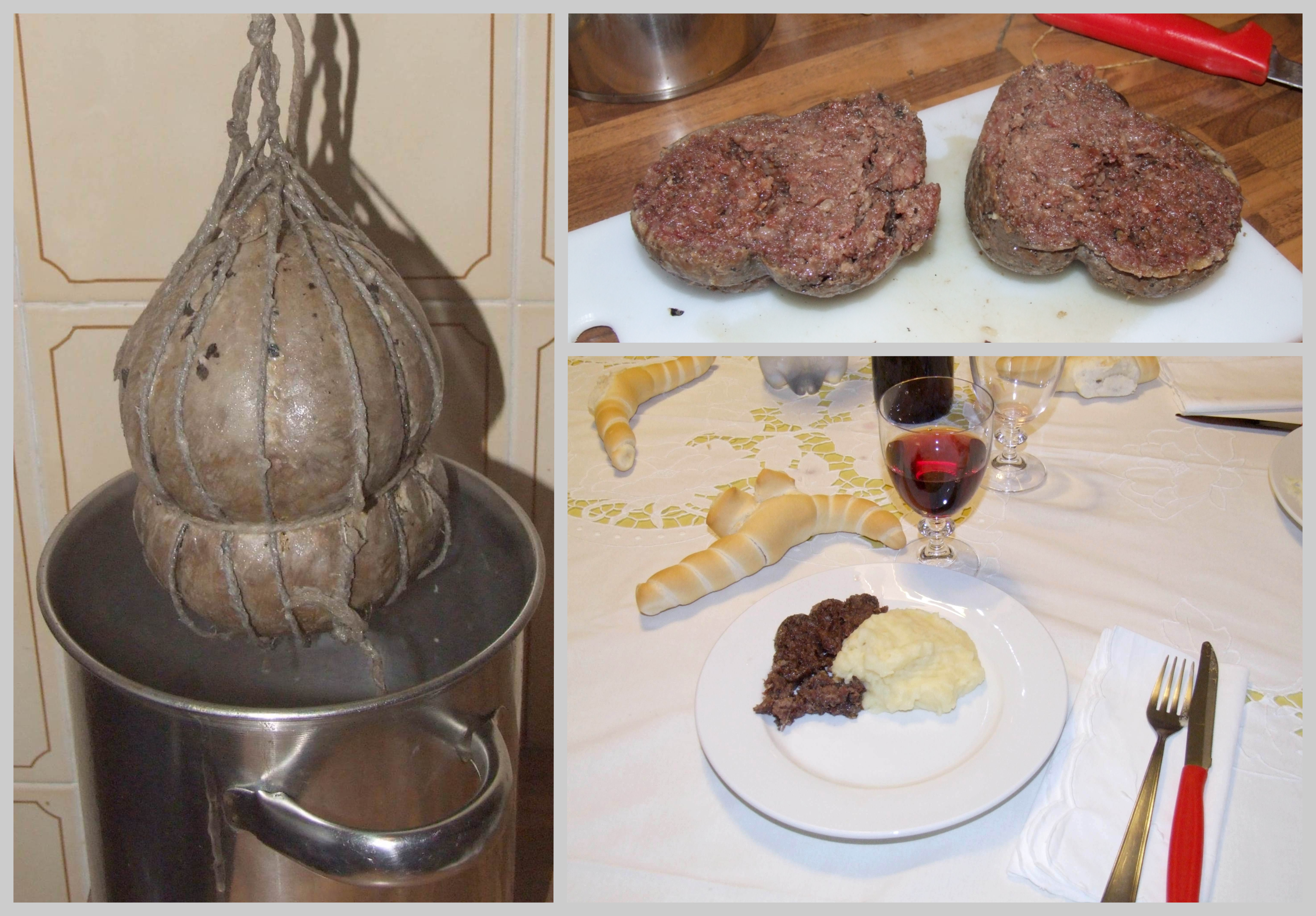
- Place of origin: Italy
- Region or state: Emilia-Romagna

Salama da sugo, also known as salamina da sugo, is a particular salami made of pork typical of the province of Ferrara consumed after cooking. It is recognized with the PGI and PDO designations of origin.

== History ==
Cristoforo di Messisbugo, steward of Duke Alfonso I d'Este, in his work published posthumously in 1549 Banchetti, composizioni di vivande e apparecchio generale indicates the general lines which can be the first citation of this preparation when he describes the way of making mortadelle di carne by using wine in the mixture of the sausage.

== Cooking ==
The procedure for cooking according to tradition is quite laborious. A first check (the so-called "piombatura") involves immersing the salama in cold water. If it sinks like lead, it means that it does not have any defects that have arisen during the aging process. If it tends to float, it means that during the aging process small air pockets have formed inside the salama which could have made it rancid.

The preparatory phase includes the immersion in lukewarm water for a whole night, followed by washing under running water in order to remove the layer of mold due to the natural aging process. For cooking it is necessary to have a high pot, in order to allow the salami to remain suspended and not to touch the bottom or the walls during the whole cooking process, which can last from four to eight hours (the time depends on the percentage of fat in the original mixture and on the aging time, information obtained from the production process). In order to obtain this result it is necessary that the binding string is usually supported by a long wooden cooking spoon or ladle placed transversally on the edge of the pot. During cooking part of the fat comes out and the mixture reaches the right consistency and the most intense taste. Salama, as opposed to cotechino, should not be pierced before cooking.

With a fatter product, cooking is achieved in less time because the fat during aging reduces dehydration and the consequent weight loss (compared to a high quality salama obtained from leaner meat), therefore it remains softer and cooking is achieved faster. The seasoning also affects the duration of cooking. If it is longer, it is necessary to cook it for a longer time in order to compensate the previous loss of water. The long cooking phase gives the salama its pleasant consistency.

Long cooking is a critical phase and one that needs experience. Salama must always remain suspended and always covered by water, therefore it is fundamental to refill the pan with hot water when necessary. Even the duration of cooking must be evaluated by an expert person.

=== Pre-cooked salama da sugo ===
In modern cooking the time to be dedicated to the preparation of food has decreased in respect to past times. Considering the difficulties of traditional cooking, pre-cooked salamina da sugo has been on the local market for many decades, as is already the case, although with a different territorial diffusion, for zampone Modena, cotechino, stinco di maiale and other similar products.

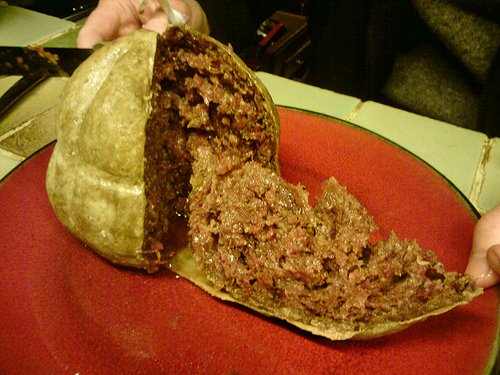
Salama da sugo

== Consumption ==
Usually salama is consumed hot. It can be done by removing the upper part of the salama and extracting the meat with a spoon or by removing the whole skin and presenting it in a container suitable to collect the sauce which comes out during the cutting into slices or slices. The traditional side dish is mashed potatoes to which is added a spoonful of the red sauce which comes out during the cutting of the salami. Many other side dishes are possible, but all less used. Because of its caloric content it could be consumed as a single dish, even though, in certain occasions, it is customary to include it in a complete meal which includes some of the most famous dishes of Ferrara's cuisine such as cappelletti, or desserts such as pampepato, torta tenerina, torta di tagliatelle or zuppa inglese.

== Ferrara's tradition ==
Salama da sugo has been part of Ferrara's culinary tradition for centuries. Riccardo Bacchelli in his Il mulino del Po (The Mill on the Po) mentions it twice. Renzo Ravenna, despite his Jewish faith, consumed it, even if only once a year. The Este Jewish community, which has been present in Ferrara for centuries, has produced a kosher variant. Orio Vergani said he appreciated it thanks to Italo Balbo who, during his visits to Ferrara, let him know all the secrets of the city.

== Festivals and events ==
The Sagra della salamina da sugo al cucchiaio is held between the end of September and the beginning of October in Poggio Renatico, in Madonna Boschi.

The La sagra della salama da sugo di Buonacompra is held in the middle of July in Buonacompra. Always in Buonacompra, the I giorni della salama da sugo I.G.P. is held in mid-October.

The Campionato mondiale della salama da sugo is held in the second half of February in Fiscaglia, organized by the Cultural Center ANCeSCAO Il Volano, in Migliarino.

== Acknowledgements ==
Antonio Frizzi, historian and writer from Ferrara, in 1722 dedicated a poem to it: La Salameide.

Salama da sugo has been included in the list of traditional food products and an independent mention is given to the salama da sugo di Madonna dei Boschi.

On October 24, 2014, salama da sugo was entered in the register of protected geographical indications (PGI).

== Bibliography ==
- Bacchelli, Riccardo (2015). Il mulino del Po (in Italian). Milan: Mondadori. ISBN 978-88-04-63313-6. OCLC 935686844.
- Barberis, Corrado (2010). Mangitalia. La storia d'Italia servita in tavola (in Italian). Rome: Donzelli. pp. 110–111. ISBN 9788860364494.
- Frizzi, Antonio (1983). La Salameide: poemetto giocoso con le note (in Italian). Ferrara: SATE. OCLC 908153274.
- Mazzuca, Giancarlo; Walch, Gianmarco (2017). Mussolini e i musulmani quando l'Islam era amico dell'Italia (in Italian). Milan: Mondadori. ISBN 9788804675402. OCLC 1032262527.
- di Messisbugo, Cristoforo (1960) [1549]. Fernando Bandini (ed.). Banchetti composizioni di vivande e apparecchio generale (in Italian). Venezia: Neri Pozza.
- Pavan, Ilaria (2006). Il podestà ebreo. La storia di Renzo Ravenna tra fascismo e leggi razziali (in Italian). Rome-Bari: Laterza. ISBN 88-420-7899-9. OCLC 799329921.
- Pozzetto, Graziano (2002). La salama da sugo ferrarese (in Italian). Preface by Alfredo Santini, Giovanni Battista Panatta; contributions by Luca Civenni and others. Rimini: Panozzo. ISBN 8874720025.
- "PROVVEDIMENTO 4 novembre 2014. Iscrizione della denominazione «Salama da Sugo» nel registro delle denominazioni di origine protette e delle indicazioni geografiche protette" (PDF) (in Italian). Quotidiano Giuridico.
