= Tortelloni =

Stuffed egg pasta

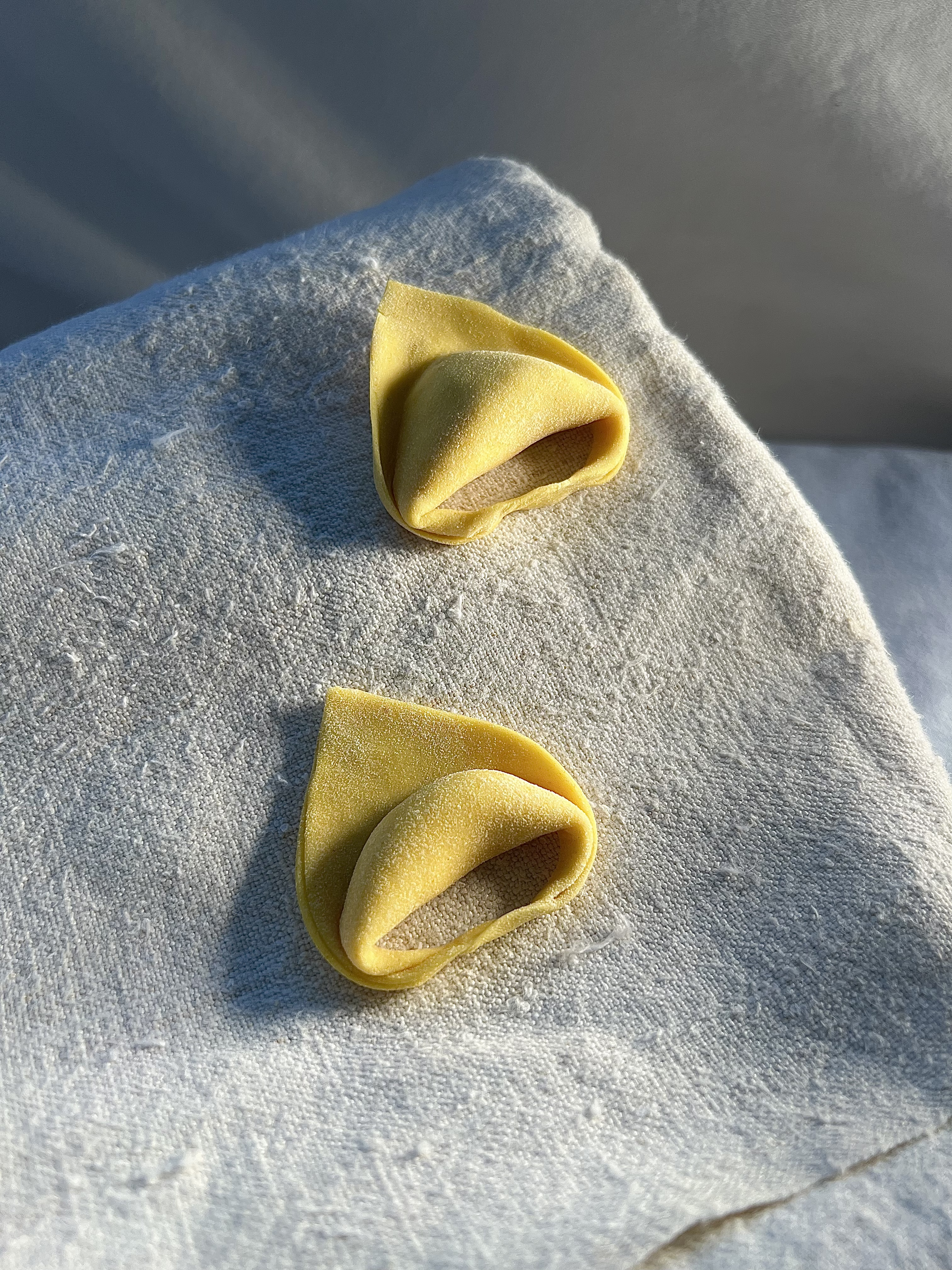
- Type: Pasta
- Place of origin: Italy
- Region or state: Emilia-Romagna; Lombardy
- Main ingredients: Flour, egg, ricotta, parsley, spinach, Parmesan
- Variations: Tortellini, cappellacci, balanzoni, tortellacci

Tortelloni is a type of stuffed pasta common in northern Italy, with a shape similar to tortellini, but larger and with a cheese-based filling. It is traditionally stuffed with ricotta, Parmesan, leafy herbs or vegetables such as parsley or spinach, egg, and nutmeg.

== Description ==
Tortelloni are similar to tortellini but are larger in size, and their filling contains no meat.

In Modena, tortelloni (tùrtlòun in the Modena dialect) are filled with ricotta cheese. Cappellacci (called caplaz in the Ferrara dialect) are a variation of tortelloni typical of Ferrara, Reggio Emilia and Mantua. They are filled with pumpkin, whose sweet flavour is enhanced by grated amaretto. The name Cappellacci (from cappelli, meaning "hats") refers to the wide-brimmed straw hats worn by farmers in the Ferrara countryside, where pumpkins are widely grown. Another variation is balanzoni, tortelloni that are green in colour due to the use of spinach in the dough. Finally, tortellacci are a variation of tortelloni, but they are larger and filled with ricotta or other cheeses, such as pecorino or gorgonzola.

When traditionally made with ricotta and herbs, after boiling them, tortelloni are often stir-fried with melted butter and sage leaves, and covered with grated Parmesan. They can also be eaten with tomato sauce.

As one of the few northern Italian pasta dishes with no meat content, it is a traditional dish for Christmas Eve.

== See also ==
- List of pasta
- Tortelli
- Tortellini
