= Cappelletti =

Ring-shaped pasta stuffed with filling

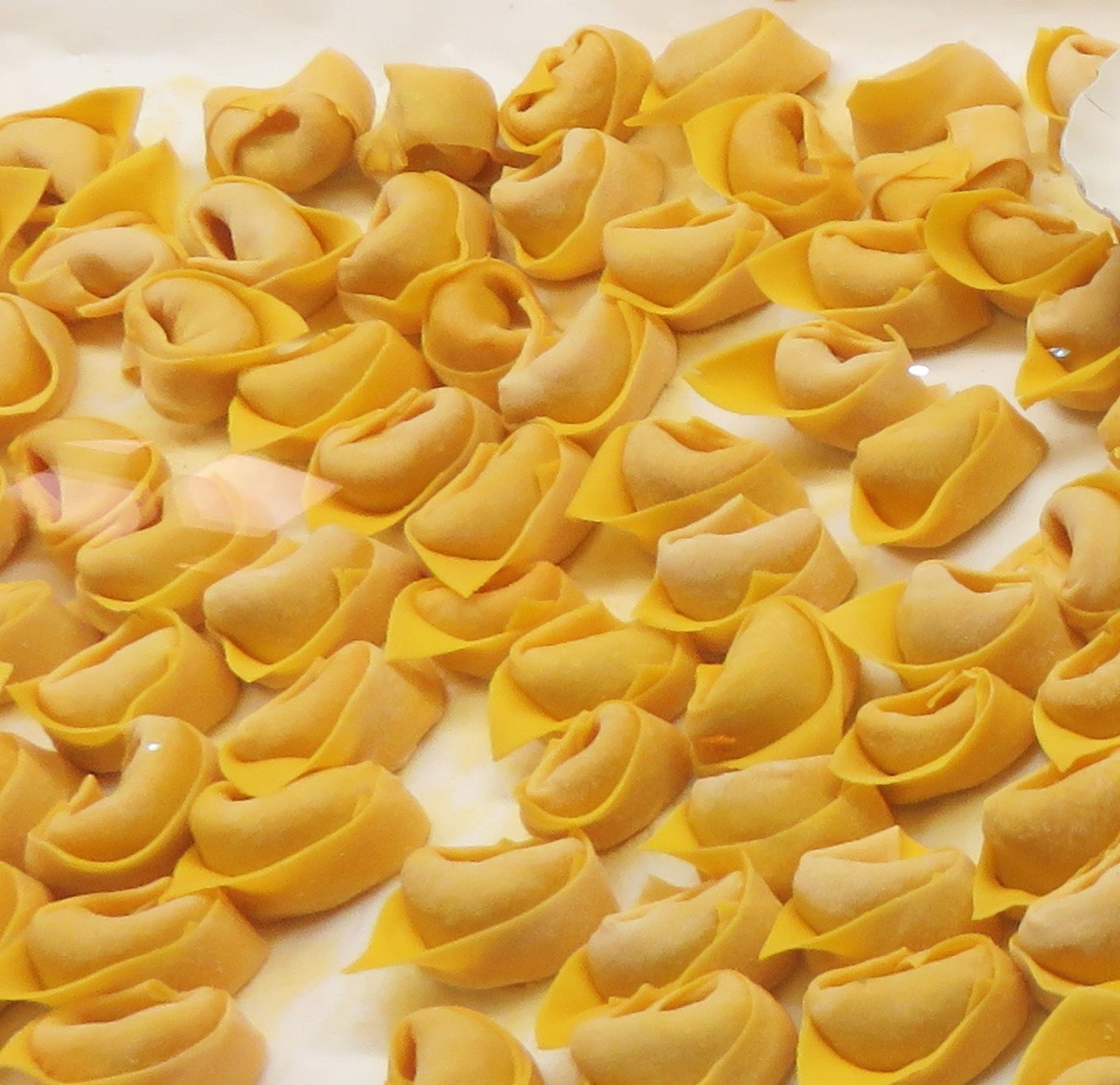
- Type: Pasta
- Place of origin: Italy
- Region or state: Emilia-Romagna; Marche; Umbria

Cappelletti (Italian: [kappelˈletti]) are ring-shaped stuffed pasta; they are named for the characteristic shape that resembles a hat (cappello in Italian). Compared to tortellini, they have a different shape, larger size, thicker dough and different filling.

The origins of the recipe, very widespread on a territorial basis, are ancient, traditionally and historically linked to Emilia-Romagna and Marche. From these areas it then spread over the centuries, becoming a typical dish in various cities. Some recent sources specifically indicate the area in the Cesena–Ferrara–Reggio Emilia triangle as the place of origin, others report Marche as a land where cappelletti are of ancient tradition.

== Production areas ==
=== Emilia ===
A first reference to this culinary preparation could perhaps be found linked to Ferrara, in a text dating back to 1556 by Cristoforo di Messisbugo, former cook of the Este court with Alfonso I d'Este, Duke of Ferrara, at the beginning of the 16th century. The traditional recipe for cappelletti includes, among the ingredients of the filling (batù) chicken, pork, veal or beef (as well as bacon and cotechino), Parmesan, eggs and nutmeg. For the puff pastry there are no particular differences compared to the one prepared for all the other types of filled pasta. In the Ferrara area we distinguish the caplìt, filled with meat and cheeses, to be consumed in broth, and the larger caplàz, with a pumpkin-based filling, to be eaten dry with meat sauce (ragù) or butter and sage.

Cappelletti are also traditional in Reggio nell’Emilia and Parma, especially during the Christmas holidays. The Reggiano type is shaped like a small hat or similar to a ring (different from the anolini or cappelletti from Parma, with a similar filling).

=== Romagna ===
Cappelletti are the dish of choice for large parties in Romagna. The Cucinario of an ancient noble family of Lugo, written by Count Giovanni Manzoni, mentions seven different recipes. Called caplét in Romagna, they follow slightly different recipes in the filling generally based on cheese and ricotta, spiced with nutmeg and grated lemon zest, in some cases with the addition of capon breast, or other meat. In Faenza they have a filling (e 'pin o e' batù) of soft cheeses, Parmesan, nutmeg and without any type of meat and are consumed exclusively in chicken broth. In the Imola area, however, the filling is based on meat. The dough is cut into squares of about 5 cm per side; in each of them a spoonful of stuffing is inserted. They are enjoyed in meat broth. It is a good idea not to remove them immediately from the pot: they should be left to soak for a few minutes so that they absorb the broth well.

Pellegrino Artusi, a native of Forlimpopoli, in his Science in the kitchen and the art of eating well, reports recipe no. 7: Romagna-style cappelletti, with ricotta-based filling (or ricotta and raviggiolo), capon breast or pork loin, to be cooked in capon broth.

=== Marche and Umbria ===
In Marche and Umbria, cappelletti are considered a typical traditional pasta. While tortellini in some areas of Marche came only after the war, cappelletti have always been homemade throughout the region, especially in the northern area, linguistically and culturally closer to Romagna. In Marche recipes, the filling is based on stewed meats including the "smells" of celery, carrot and a little onion, passed through a meat grinder, to which raw eggs, grated aged cheese, nutmeg and grated lemon zest are sometimes added. Some annual celebrations, such as large Christmas lunches, include cappelletti in broth as a traditional first course.

In Umbria, cappelletti in capon broth are also considered the typical dish on New Year's Day. Unlike Romagna, where the filling is made with cheeses, the Umbrian recipe also includes mixed meat: veal, turkey or chicken and pork loin.

Dry cappelletti, with meat sauce or other sauce, are a recent creation.

== See also ==
Media related to Cappelletti at Wikimedia Commons

- List of pasta
