= Tagliatelle =

Type of pasta

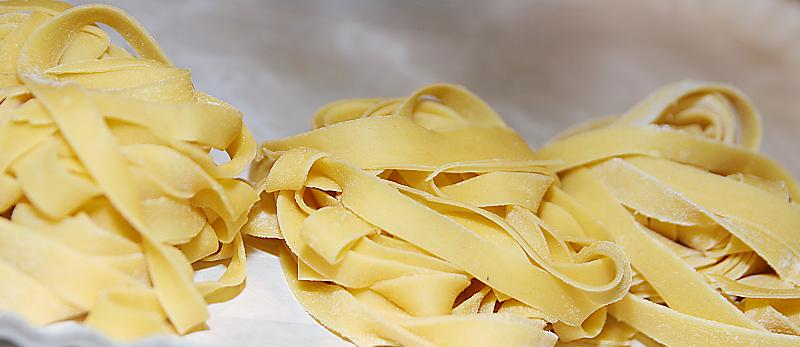
- The distinctive shape of tagliatelle pasta
- Type: Pasta
- Place of origin: Italy
- Region or state: Emilia-Romagna; Marche
- Main ingredients: Durum wheat semolina flour, eggs
- Variations: Fettuccine, pizzoccheri, tagliolini
- Other information: Long and thin. Classically served with a meat sauce; can also be served with a creamy sauce and cheese.

Tagliatelle (Italian: [taʎʎaˈtɛlle]; from the Italian word tagliare, meaning 'to cut') are a traditional type of pasta from the Italian regions of Emilia-Romagna and Marche. Individual pieces of tagliatelle are long, flat ribbons that are similar in shape to fettuccine and are traditionally about 6 mm (1/4 in) wide. Tagliatelle can be served with a variety of sauces, though the classic is a meat sauce or Bolognese sauce.

Tagliatelle are traditionally made with egg pasta. The traditional ratio is one egg to one hundred grams of flour.

== Origins ==
The term tagliatelle can be traced back to the Renaissance, with one of its first written records appearing in a treaty by Cristoforo di Messisbugo, steward of the House of Este in Ferrara, published in 1549. Tagliatelle are also mentioned in 1593 among the main pasta shapes by the humanist Tommaso Garzoni.

A glass case in the Bologna chamber of commerce holds a solid gold replica of a piece of tagliatella, demonstrating the correct width of 8 mm (5/16 in) when cooked, equivalent to 6.5–7 mm (1/4–9/32 in) uncooked, depending on the hardness of the dough.

== Dishes ==
Tagliatelle have a porous and rough texture, making them ideal for thick sauces, generally made with beef, veal, or pork (such as Bolognese sauce), and occasionally with rabbit, as well as several other less rich (and more vegetarian) options, such as briciole e noci (with breadcrumbs and nuts), uovo e formaggio (with eggs and cheese), or simply pomodoro e basilico (with tomatoes and basil).

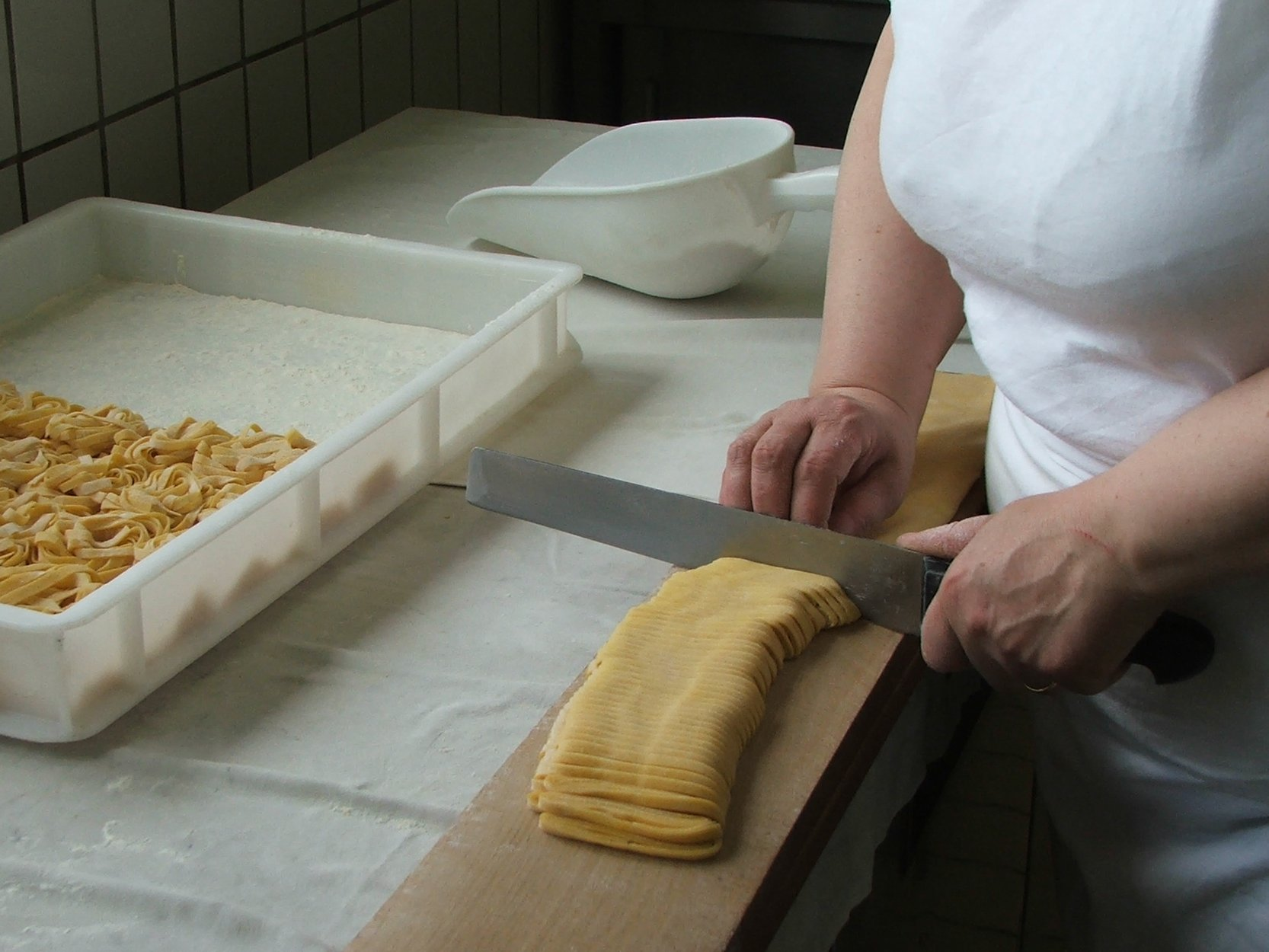
Traditional hand-cutting of tagliatelle

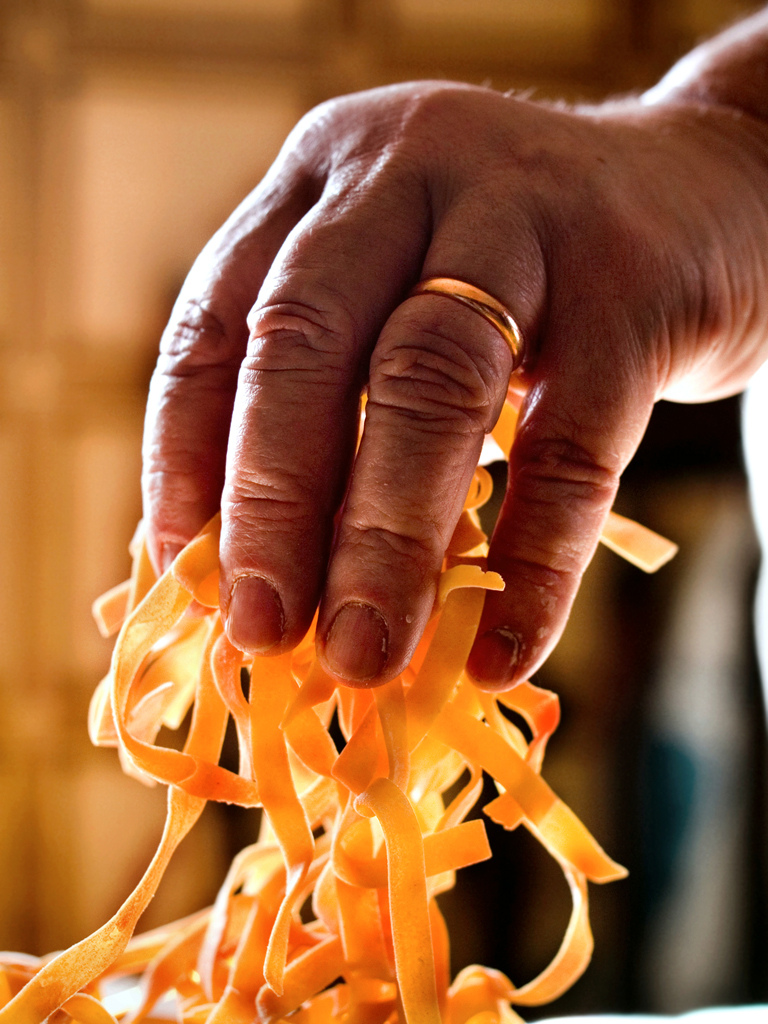
Fresh handmade tagliatelle

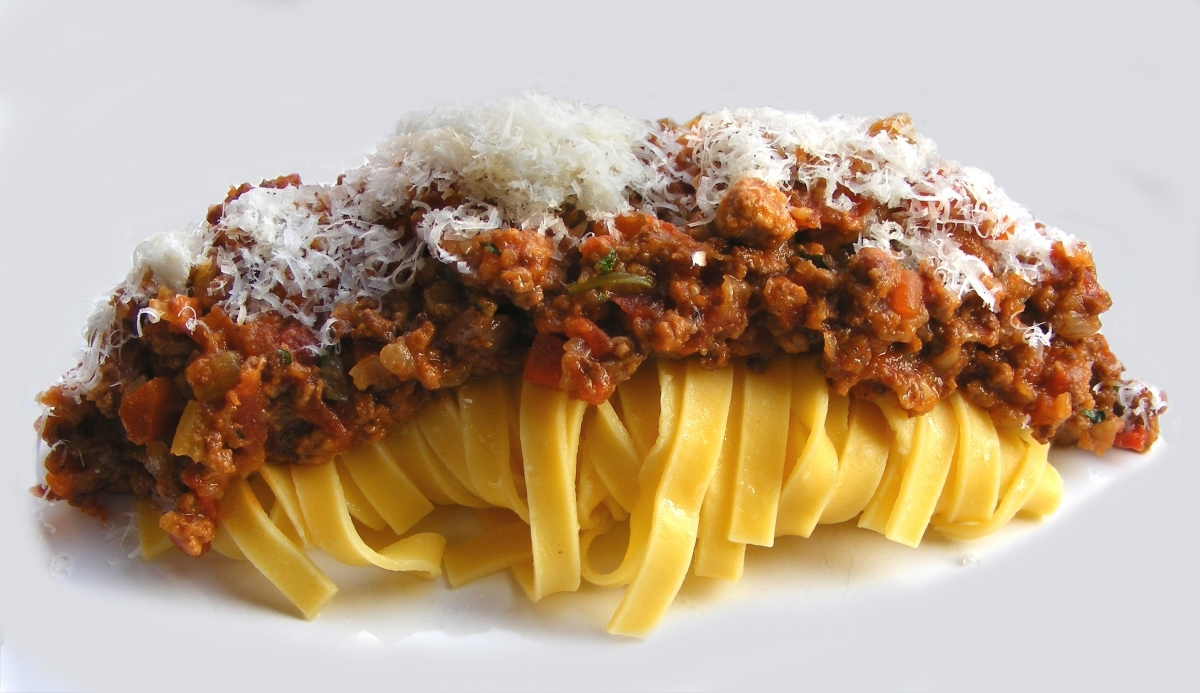
Tagliatelle served with meat sauce

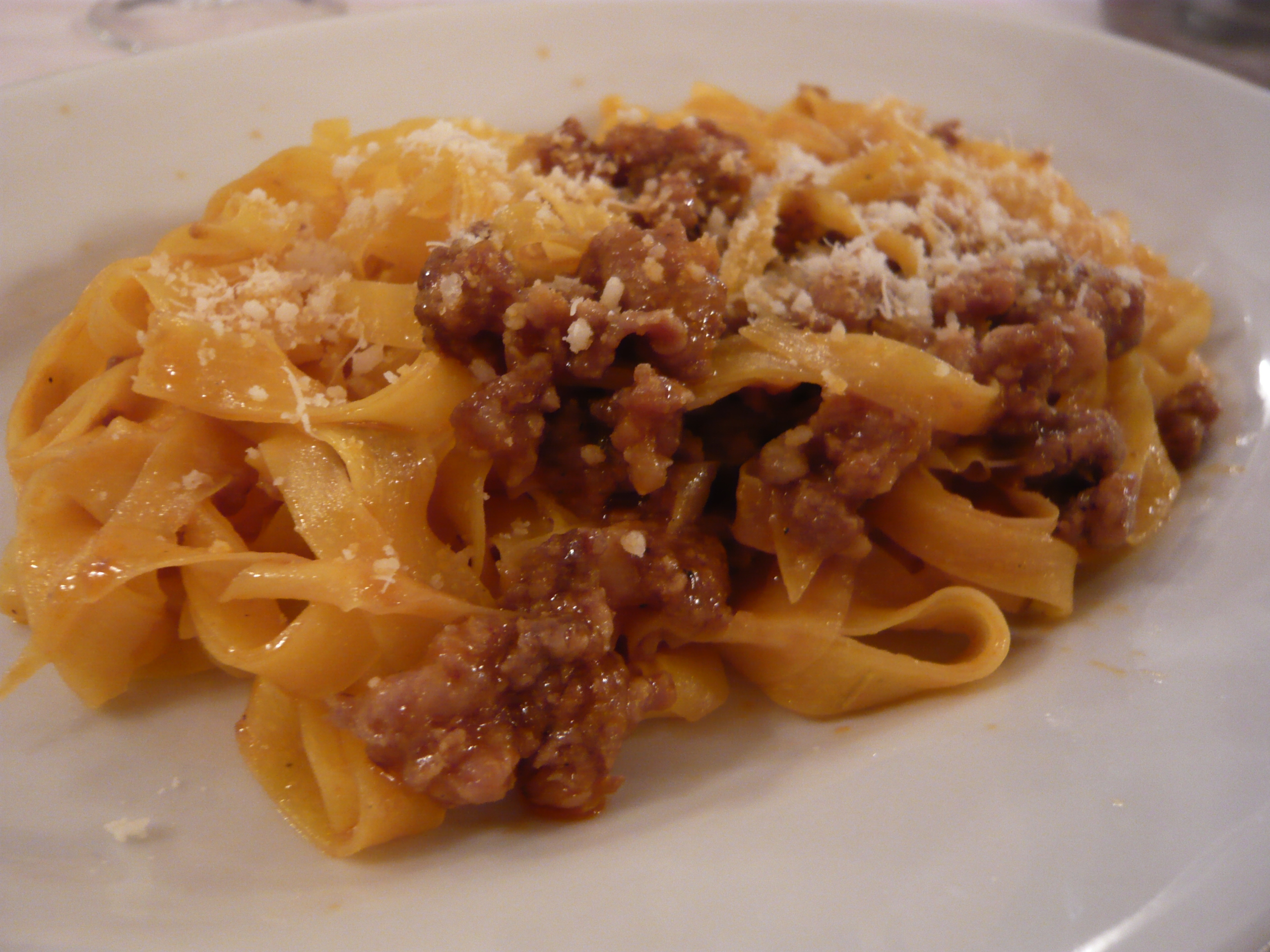
Tagliatelle al ragù as served in their city of origin, Bologna

== See also ==
- List of pasta
