= Salame Felino =

Variety of Italian salame

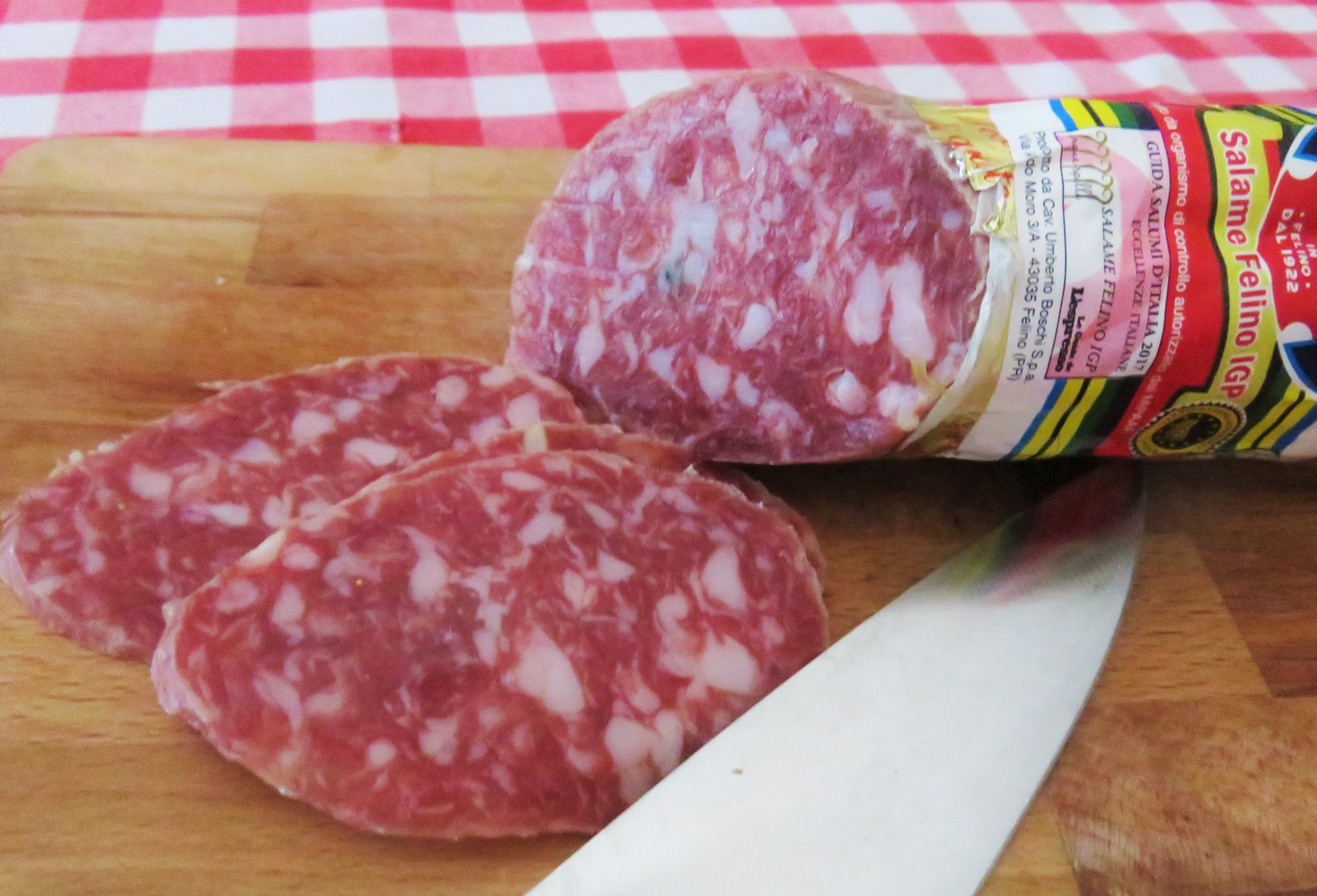
- Place of origin: Italy
- Region or state: Emilia-Romagna
- Main ingredients: Pork
- Ingredients generally used: Salt, whole-grain pepper

Salame Felino is a variety of Italian salume historically produced in the comune (municipality) of Felino and in some neighboring comuni, such as Sala Baganza and Langhirano, all in the province of Parma. It is recognized as a protected geographical indication (PGI).

== Preparation ==
Salame Felino is produced from pure pork. The mixture is made up of pork called "bench mince" (shoulder of the animal), roughly made up of 70% lean and 30% selected fat parts. It is minced to medium-coarse grained. Salt, peppercorns, and potassium nitrate are usually added and sometimes ascorbates (antioxidants and acidity regulators) and sugars as well. Crushed garlic and pepper are also added and dissolved in dry white wine. The mixture is stuffed into natural pork casing of Danish origin. Traditionally, budello gentile from the rectum is used. It is a smooth and thick gut, which allows the meat mixture which it contains to remain soft even after long curing. The ideal curing period for salame Felino is at least 60 days, favored by the particular microclimate of the Parma area. Today, the majority of salame Felino producers use special rooms at a controlled temperature for the curing of the product.

== Organoleptic characteristics ==
When sliced, salame Felino has an intense red color, with white spots of the ground fat. The compactness of the meat is closely linked to the curing and the quality of the meat used to produce the salami. The scent is intense, very characteristic, while the flavor is delicate.

== Use ==
Salame Felino is one of the most typical appetizers of the Parma area, especially when paired with prosciutto di Parma, which is produced in the same area. It is often served with Lambrusco wine. Traditionally it is cut diagonally, thus creating oval slices, approximately double the length of the diameter of the salami, and as thick as a peppercorn.

== See also ==
Media related to Salame di Felino at Wikimedia Commons
