= Tortelli =

Stuffed pasta

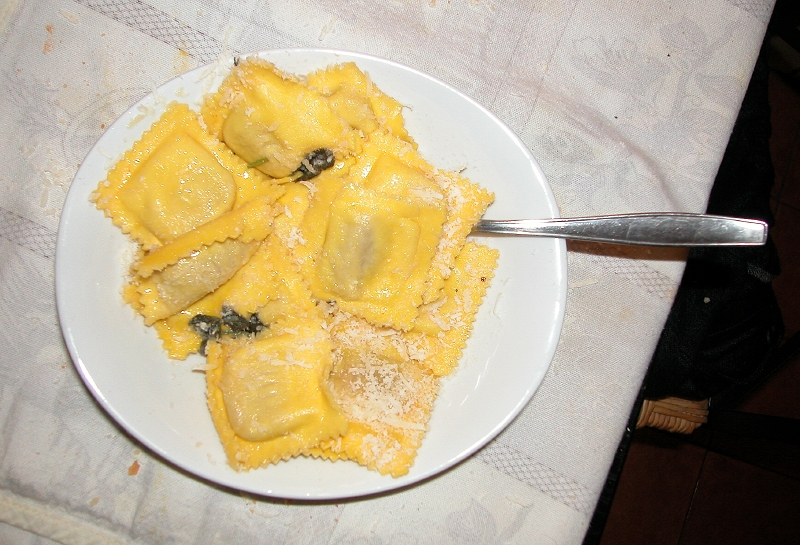
Tortelli di zucca al burro e salvia (pumpkin-filled tortelli with butter and sage)

Tortelli (Italian: [torˈtɛlli]) is a type of stuffed pasta made in the Emilia-Romagna, Lombardy, and Tuscany regions of Italy. It can be found in several shapes, including square (similar to ravioli), semi-circular (similar to agnolini) or twisted into a rounded, hat-like form (similar to cappelletti). Cookbook author Marcella Hazan credits Emilia-Romagna as the "birthplace" of tortelli.

== See also ==
Media related to Tortelli at Wikimedia Commons

- List of pasta
- Tortellini
- Tortelloni
