= Ciccioli =

Italian pork dish

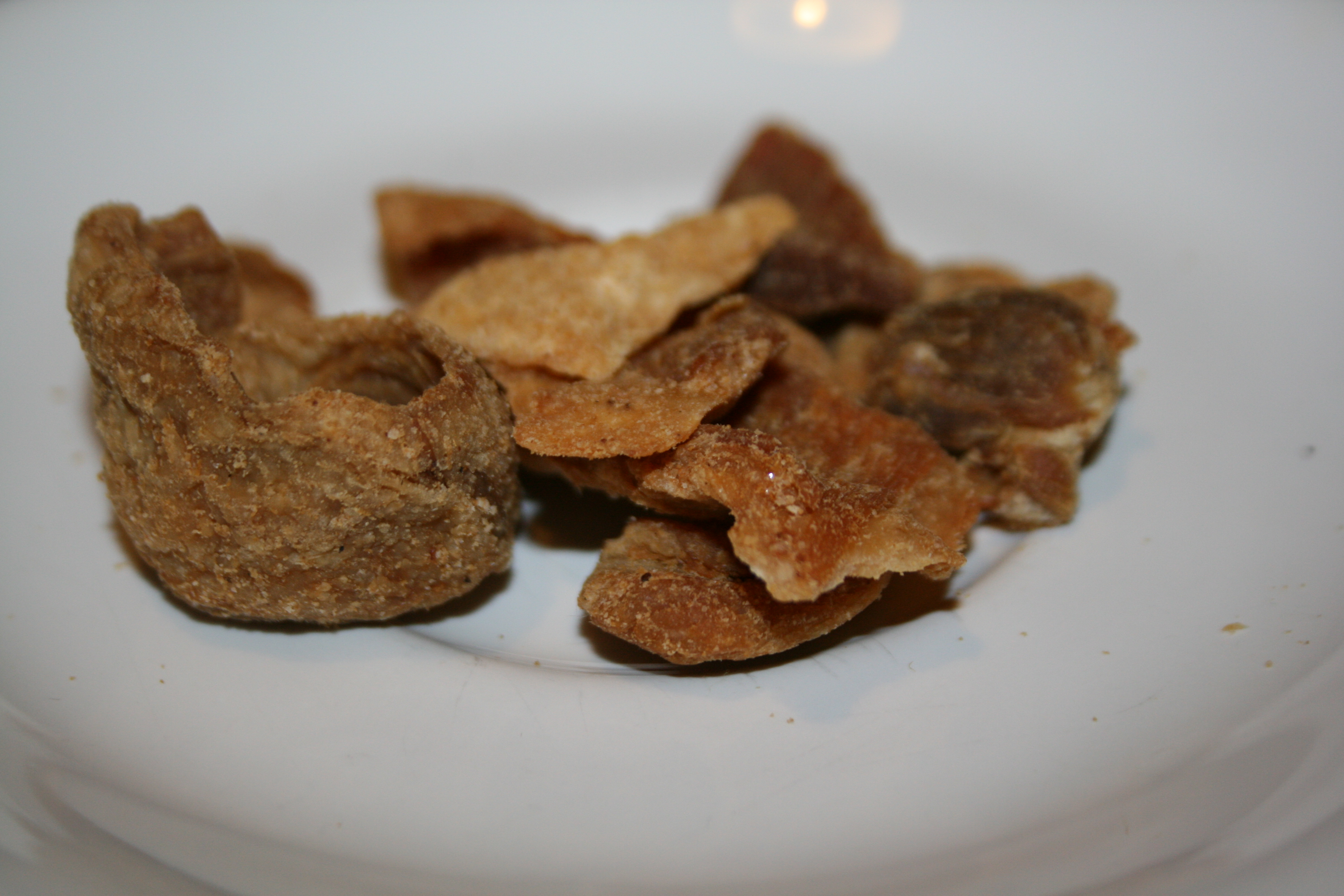
This is a plate of ciccioli, which are like pork rinds.

Ciccioli are pressed cakes of fatty pork. They are known under this name in Emilia-Romagna, being popular in Modena, Reggio Emilia, Bologna, Parma, Piacenza, and Romagna. In Naples and Apulia they are called cicoli, in Lazio and Umbria sfrizzoli, and in Calabria risimugli.

Ciccioli are made by compressing, drying, and aging fatty, leftover pieces of pork. These scraps are compressed using a special press where the meat is wrapped in sack cloth, then slowly squeezed over several weeks to remove excess liquid. They can either be prepared in a wet preparation that can be sliced and served, or in a very dry, crunchy, chip-like form often called ciccioli frolli. They result also as leftovers from the preparation of strutto.

== See also ==
- List of pork dishes

== Bibliography ==
- Guarnaschelli Gotti, Marco (2007) [1990]. Università degli Studi di Scienze Gastronomiche (ed.). Grande enciclopedia illustrata della gastronomia. DOC (in Italian). Milan: Mondadori. p. 302. ISBN 978-88-04-56749-3.
