= Filled pasta =

Pasta that contains fillings

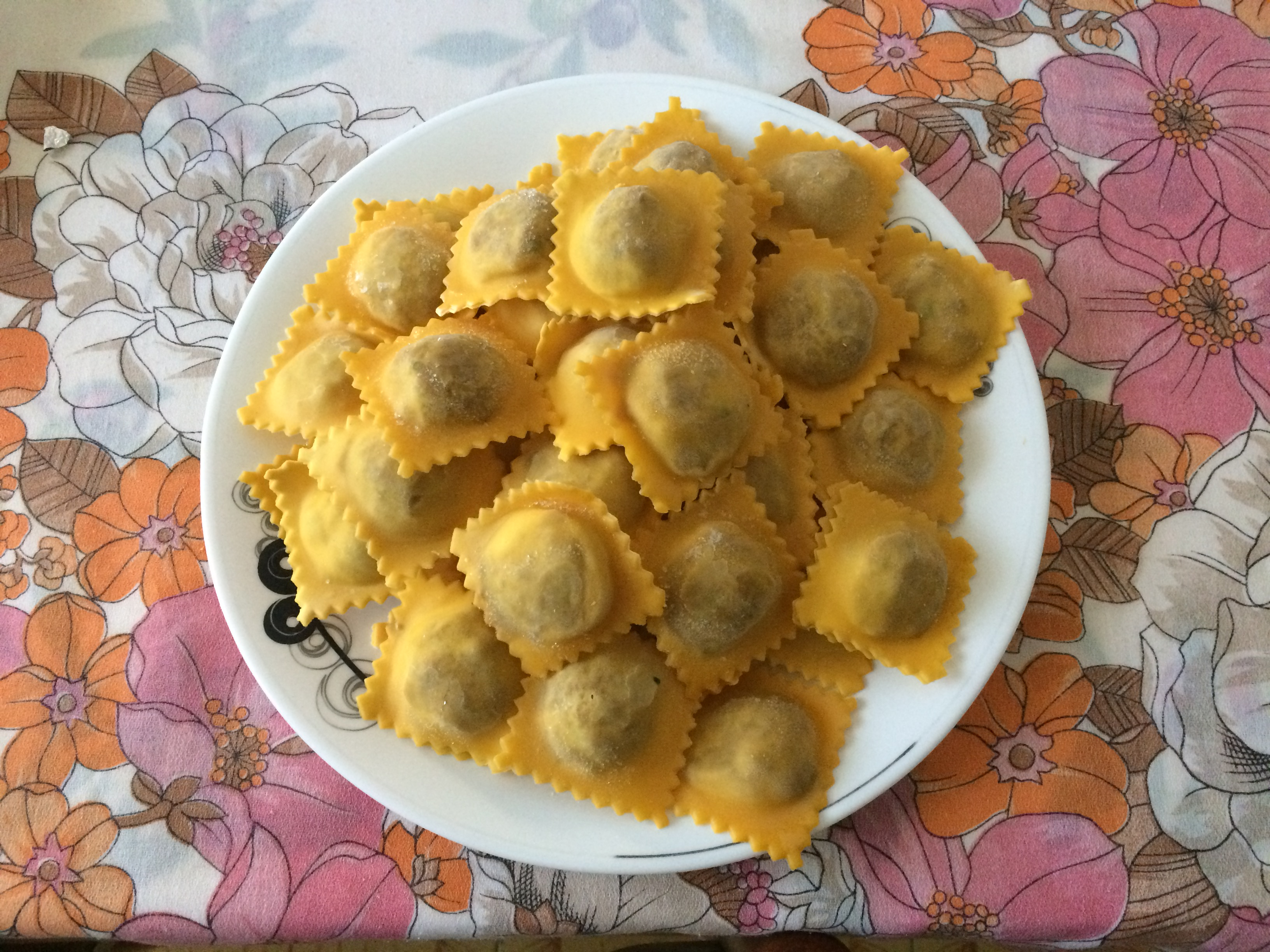
Pavese agnolotti, an Italian meat-filled pasta

Filled pasta or stuffed pasta is pasta, usually sealed, surrounding a variety of fillings. Such pasta is especially common and traditional in regions of Europe, namely Italy, Austria and Switzerland, southern parts of Germany, and the Balkan. Examples of filled pasta include ravioli and tortellini.

== Preparation ==
The pasta wrappers are usually fresh pasta, but dried pasta can be used if the wrapper is not sealed. Premade filled pasta for mass consumption is often pasteurized to set the dough structure and sold vacuum-sealed for cold storage, or even dried for extended shelf-life without cooling.

== Variations ==
While most filled pastas are sealed on all sides, rotolo ripieno is rolled, but not sealed. Similar types of pasta include layered pasta such as lasagna, while similar stuffed preparations include kachoris, samosas and tamales.

== See also ==
- List of stuffed dishes
- List of pasta § Filled pasta
- List of pasta dishes
- List of Italian pasta varieties
- Dumplings
