= Tortellini =

Stuffed egg pasta

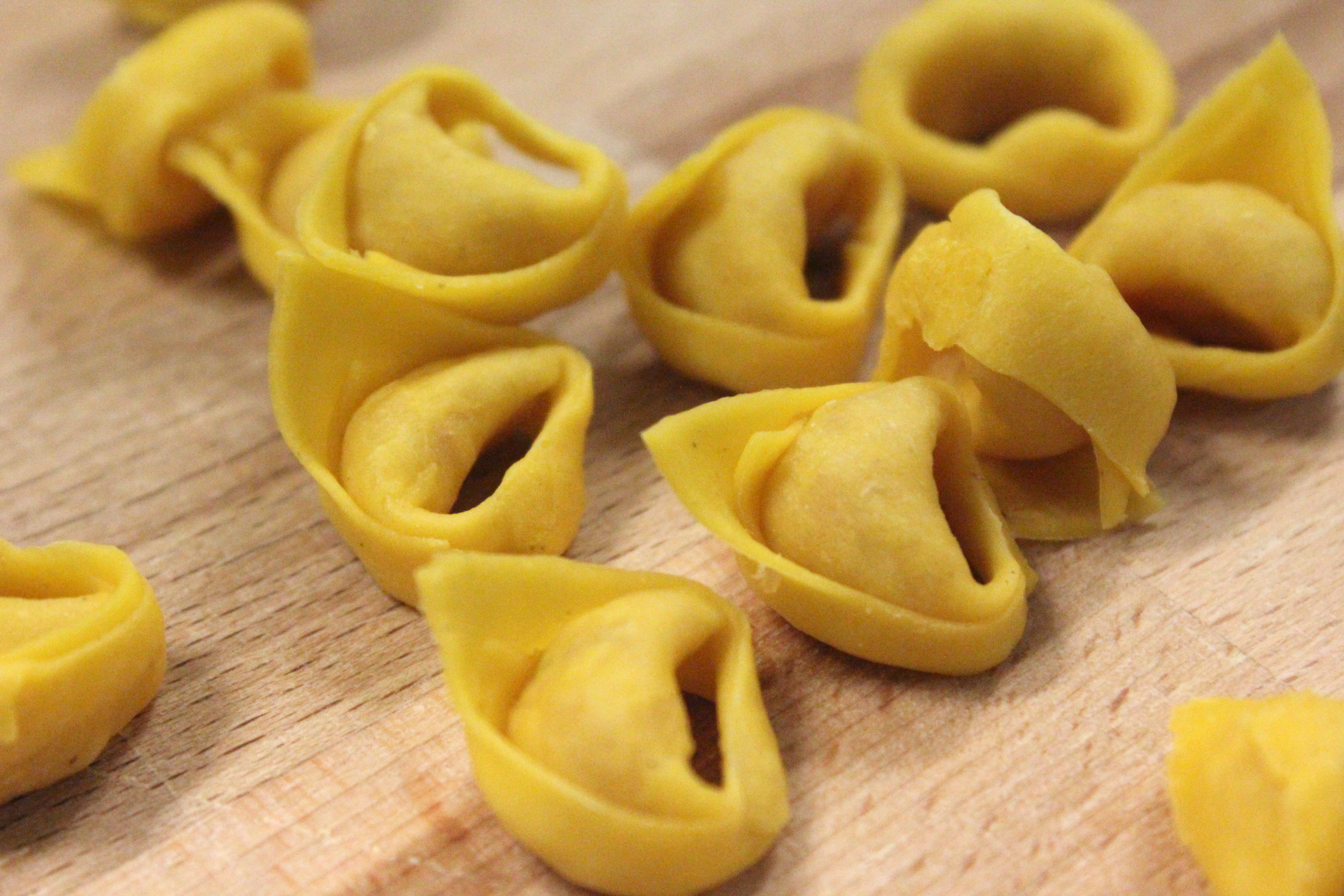
- The distinctive shape of tortellini
- Type: Pasta
- Place of origin: Italy
- Region or state: Emilia-Romagna
- Variations: Tortelloni

Tortellini is a type of stuffed pasta typical of the Italian cities of Bologna and Modena, in the Emilia-Romagna region. Traditionally it is stuffed with a mix of meat (pork loin, prosciutto, mortadella), Parmesan cheese, egg, and nutmeg and served in capon broth (in brodo di cappone).

== Origins ==
The origin of tortellini is disputed; both Bologna and Modena, cities in the Emilia-Romagna region of Italy, claim to be its birthplace. The word tortellino is a diminutive form of tortello, itself a diminutive of torta, meaning "cake" or "pie".

The recipe for a dish called tortelletti appears in 1570 from Bartolomeo Scappi. Vincenzo Tanara's writings in the mid-17th century may be responsible for the pasta's renaming to tortellini. In the 1800s, legends sprang up to explain the recipe's origins, offering a compromise. Castelfranco Emilia, located between Bologna and Modena, is featured in one legend, in which Venus stays at an inn. Overcome by her beauty, the innkeeper spies on her through a keyhole, through which he can only see her navel. He is inspired to create a pasta in this shape. This legend would be at the origin of the term ombelico di Venere (lit. 'Venus' navel'), occasionally used to describe tortellini. In honour of this legend, an annual festival is held in Castelfranco Emilia. Another legend posits that the shape comes from Modena's architecture, which resembles a turtle.

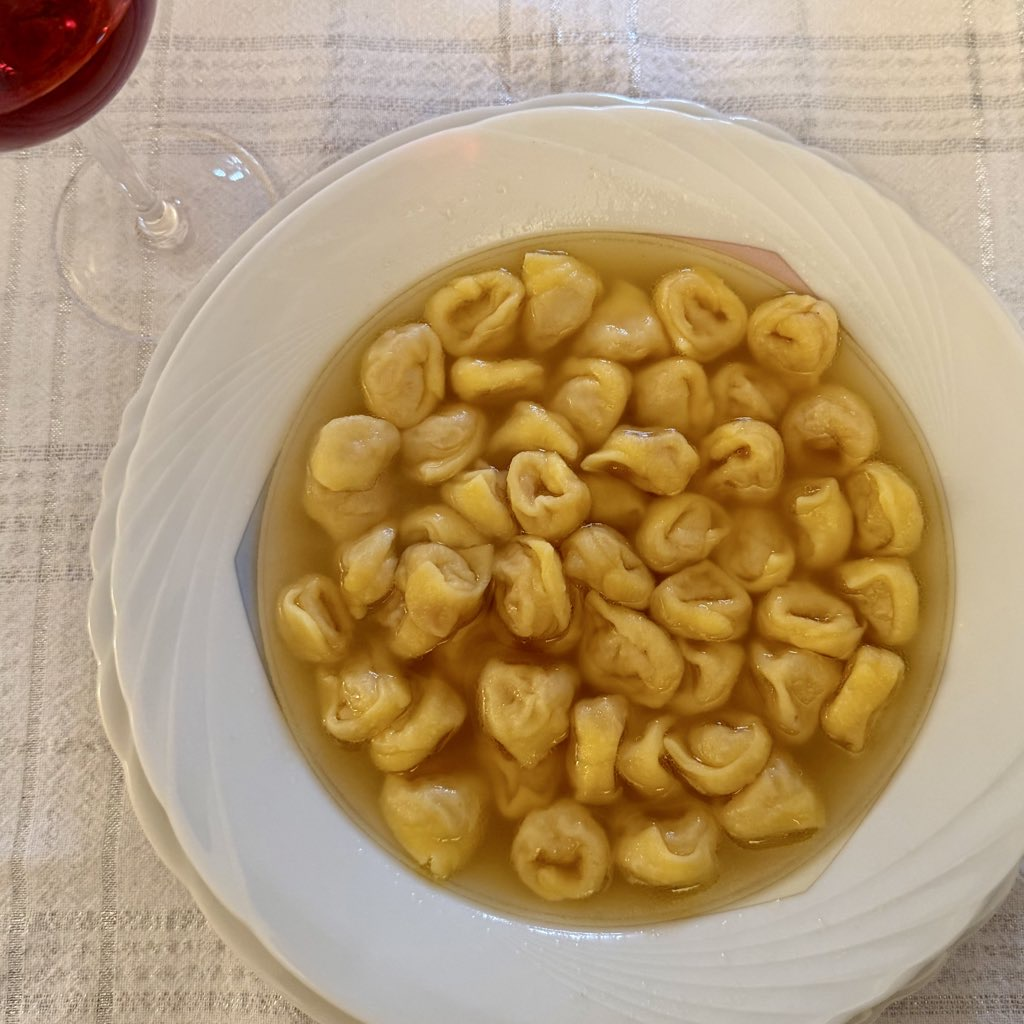
Tortellini in brodo

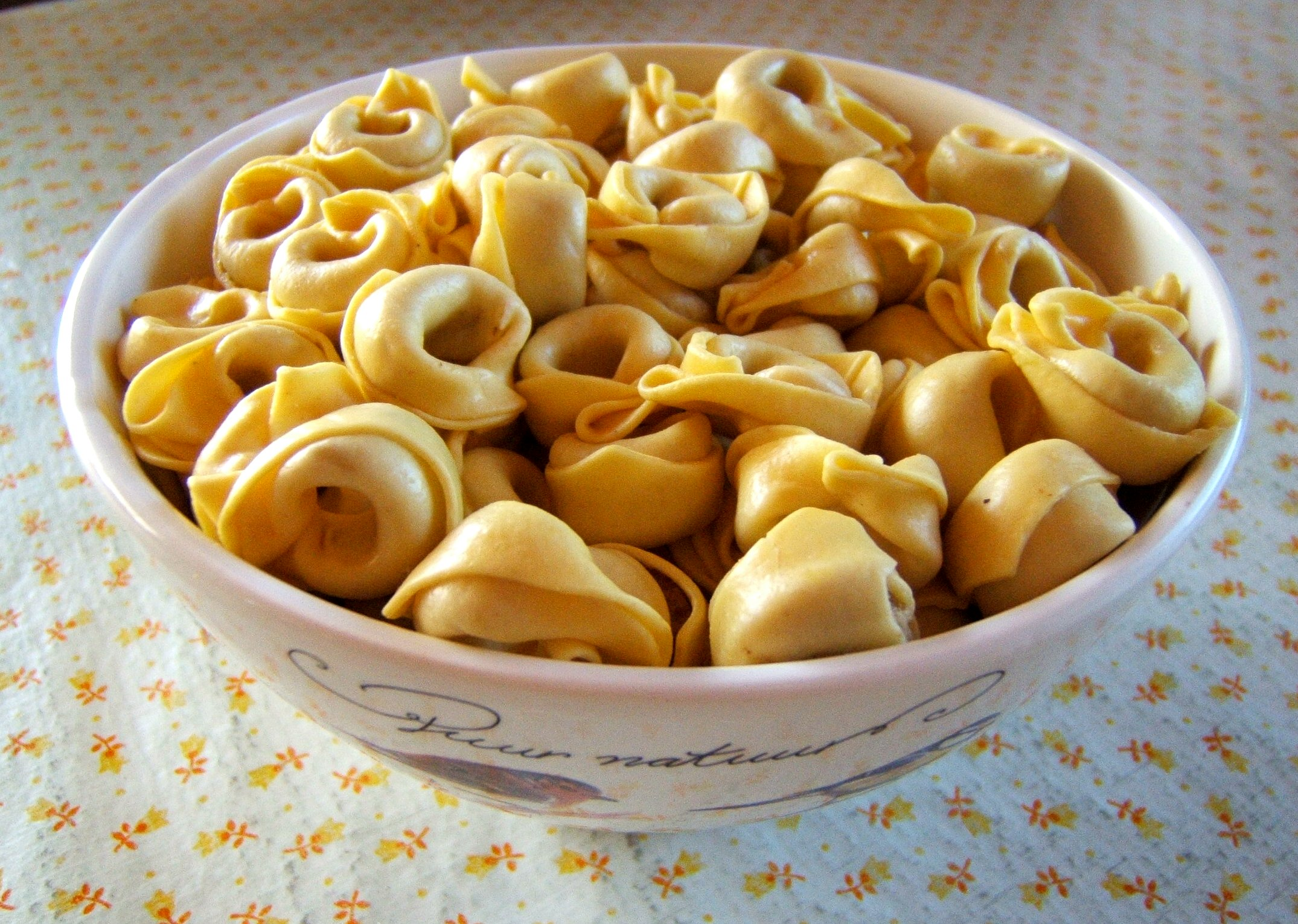
Industrially-made tortellini, easily recognizable for the extremely regular cut of the dough and the symmetrical closing of the extremities

== Comparison with tortelloni ==
Tortelloni is pasta in a similar shape, but larger, typically 5 g, vs. 2 g for tortellini. While tortellini has a meat-based filling, tortelloni is filled with ricotta and sometimes with parsley or spinach. Moreover, while tortellini is traditionally cooked in and served with broth, tortelloni is cooked in water, stir-fried (traditionally with butter and sage), and served dry.

== See also ==
- List of pasta
- Pelmeni
- Tortelli
- Tortelloni
