= Cristoforo di Messisbugo =

Italian cook and steward (died 1548)

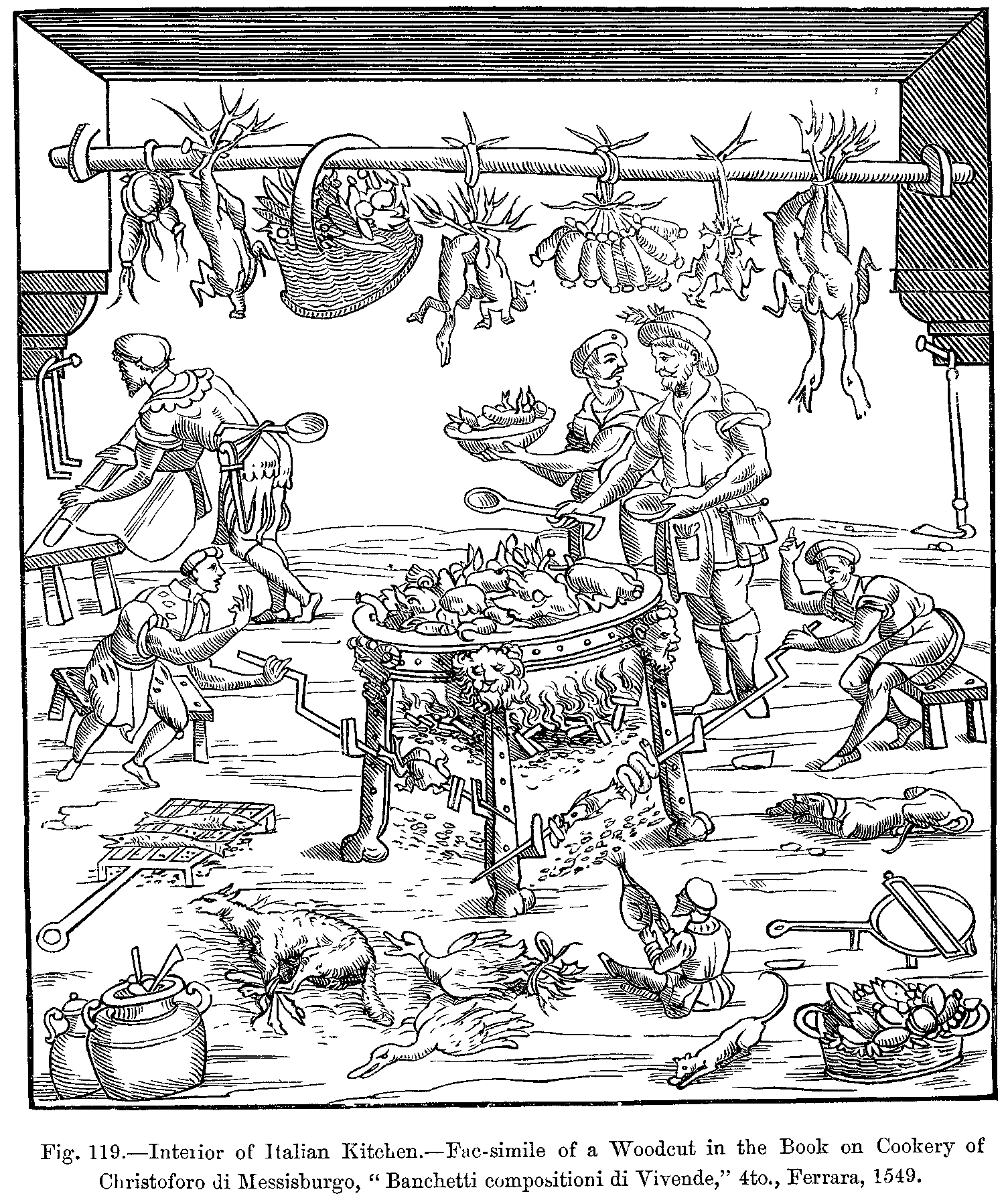
Illustration to Messisbugo's cookbook on how to prepare a banquet, Banchetti composizioni di vivande e apparecchio generale.

Cristoforo di Messisbugo or Cristoforo da Messisbugo (15th century – 1548) was a steward of the House of Este in Ferrara and an Italian cook of the Renaissance.

== Biography ==
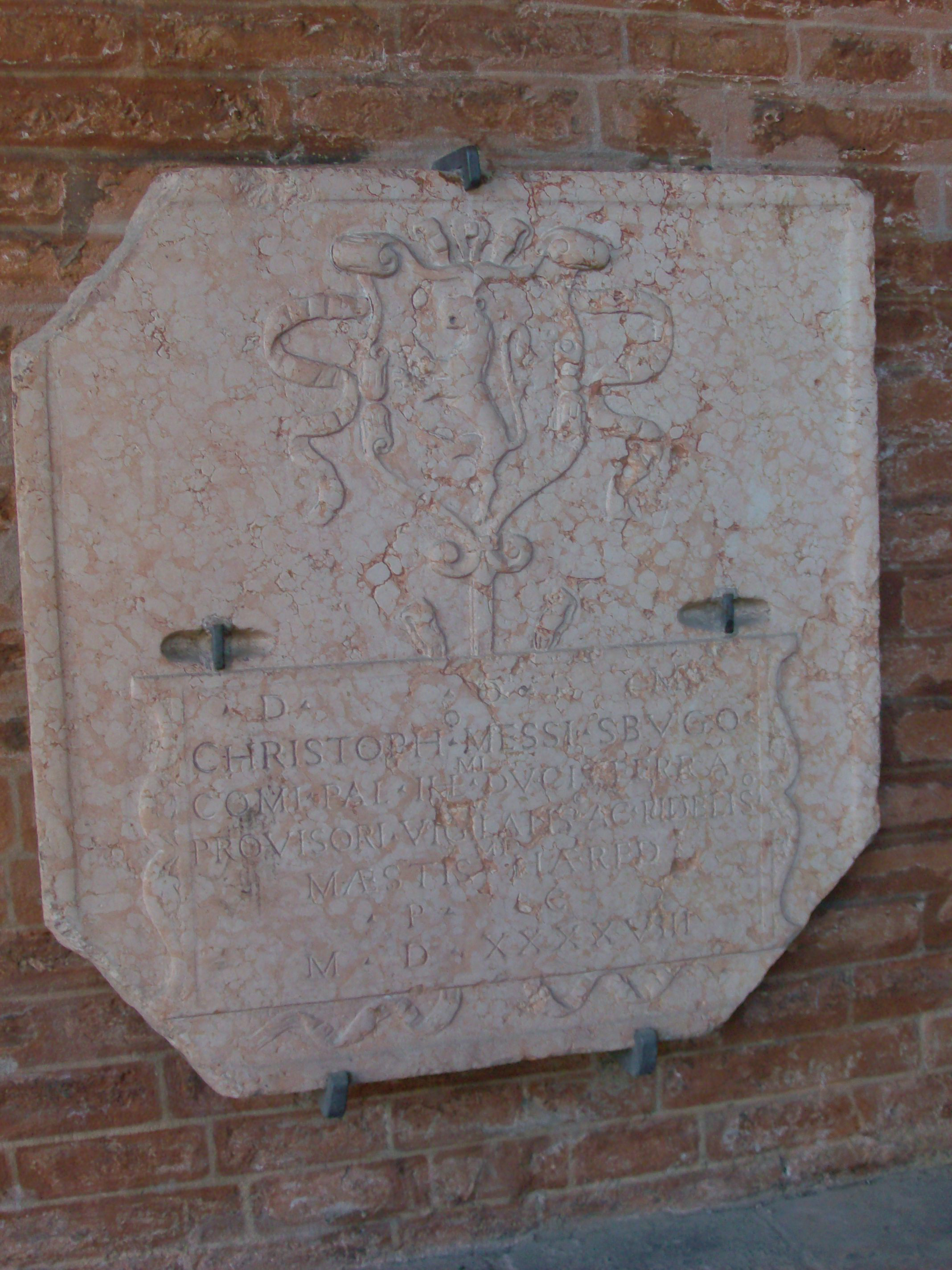
The funeral inscription of Cristoforo di Messisbugo in the monastery of Sant'Antonio in Polesine.

From 1524 to 1548, di Messisbugo served at the courts of Alfonso I and his son, Ercole II, in Ferrara, where he organized many lavish banquets. Greatly appreciated as a master of ceremonies, he was made count palatine on 20 January 1533 by the Holy Roman Emperor Charles V.

His cookbook Banchetti, composizioni di vivande e apparecchio generale, which was published posthumously in 1549, is addressed to those preparing princely feasts and provides detailed descriptions of the menus for his official banquets at the Este court. As well as listing recipes, it also discusses logistics, decor, and cooking equipment. Libro novo nel qual si insegna a far d'ogni sorte di vivanda, attributed to him and published in Venice in 1564, well after his death, is largely a repetition of his recipes in Banchetti. Some of the dishes he described survive today in the Ferrara area.

The first known reference to the preparation of Beluga sturgeon caviar (from the Po River) in Italy is in Messisbugo's books. He described serving and preserving caviar.

He is buried in the church of the monastery of Sant'Antonio in Polesine.

== Bibliography ==
- Cristoforo da Messisbugo, Banchetti, composizioni di vivande e apparecchio generale, Ferrara, 1549 full text
- Cristoforo da Messisbugo, Libro novo nel qual si insegna a far d'ogni sorte di vivanda, Venezia, 1564 full text

== See also ==
- Bartolomeo Scappi

== Sources ==
- Alberto Capatti, Massimo Montanari, Italian Cuisine: A Cultural History, 2003.
